= Ben Buckler, New South Wales =

Locality in eastern Sydney, NSW, Australia

Coordinates: 33.893625°S 151.283688°E

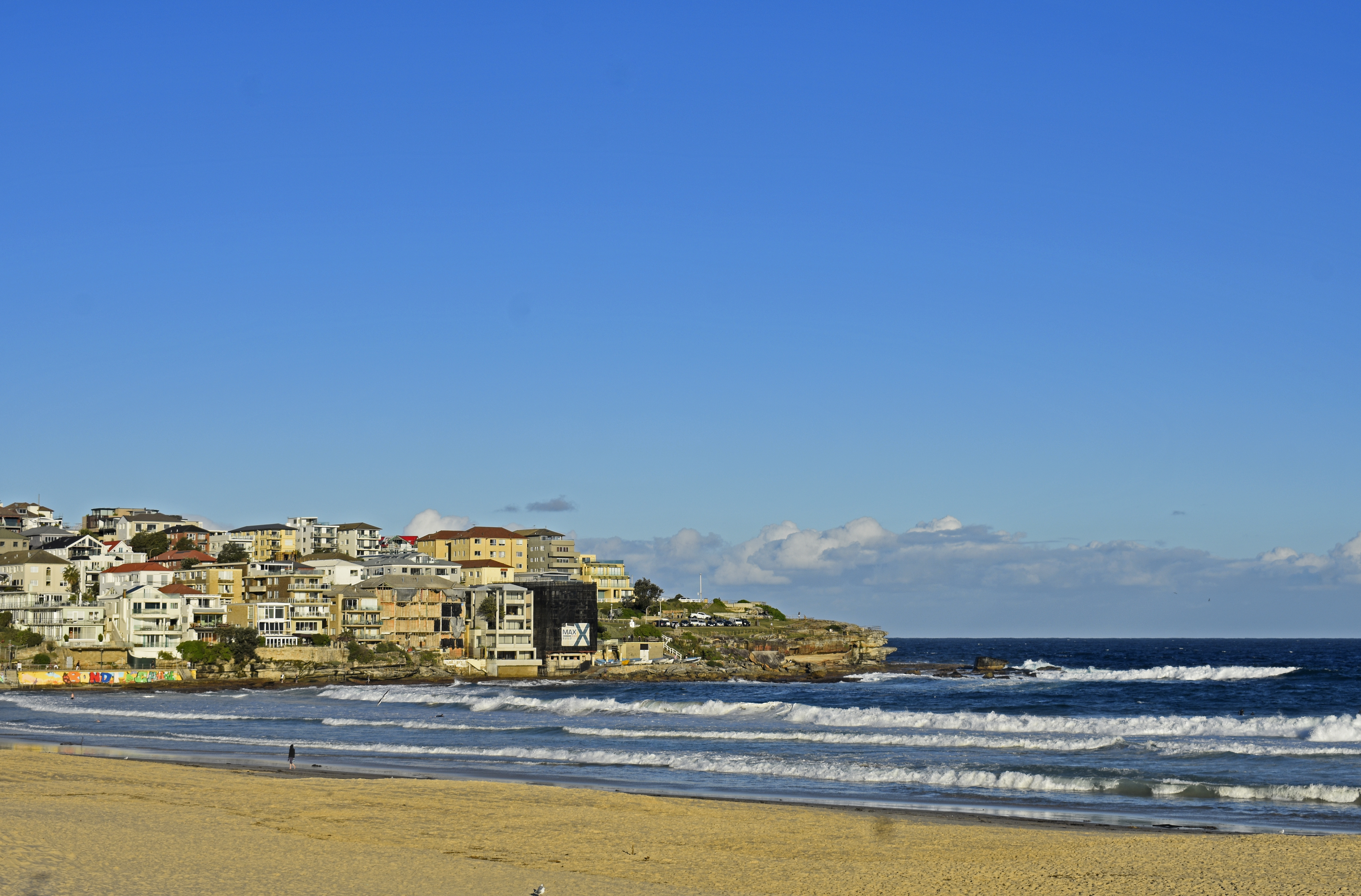
Ben Buckler seen from the Bondi Beach

Ben Buckler is an urban locality in the eastern suburbs of Sydney, in the state of New South Wales, Australia. It is part of the suburb of North Bondi in the Waverley Council local government area. It is sometimes referred to simply as "the northern headland of Bondi Bay."

Ben Buckler is the location of the heritage-listed Ben Buckler Gun Battery, which was built in 1892 and subsequently buried; it was later excavated by the NSW Water Board and then reburied. It is also the location of the heritage-listed Bondi Sewer Vent.

The surfing media refer to ocean waves breaking off the adjacent coast as 'Ben Buckler' or "the Buckler". For instance: The ’Buckler, as its affectionately known, has a rep for being a bit of a burger, but if you paddle deep enough it tosses up a challenging drop, and roaring left wall that’s been ridden in the fifteen-foot-plus realm

== Etymology ==
The first recorded use of the name was in 1831, when a land grant to Richard Hurd at North Bondi was described as being "...to a point called Ben Buckler." Common theories about its name were set out in a research note issued by Waverley Council Library:

- It is named after a convict, Benjamin Buckler or Ben Buckley, who lived locally with the Aboriginal people in 1810;
- A bushranger named Ben Buckley lived in a cave in the rocks at the northern end of Bondi Beach;
- Obed West (1807–1891) claimed that it was a corruption of an Aboriginal word.

== Gallery ==
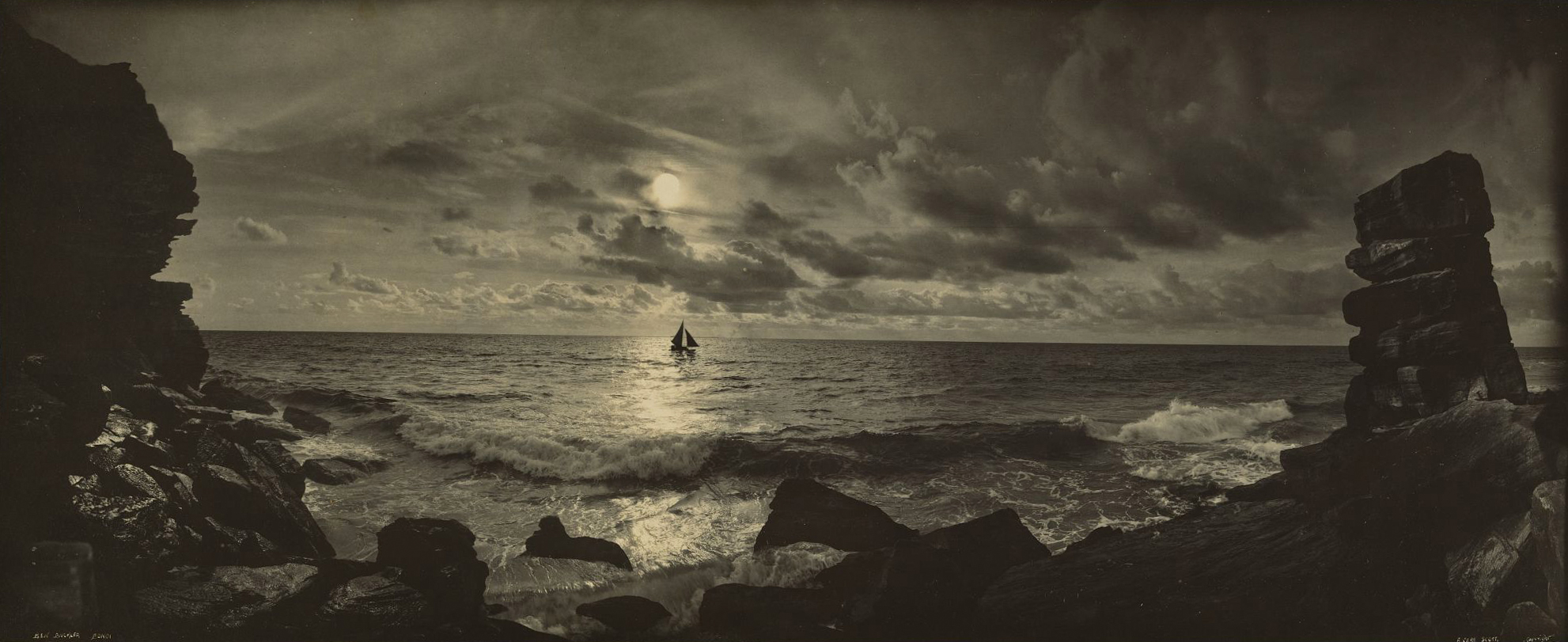
Robert Vere Scott (c.1905) Ben Buckler, Bondi, made using a Kodak Panoram camera, exposed to look as if taken by moonlight, but actually taken in daylight. Silver gelatin print 23.3 h x 56.9 w cm. National Gallery of Australia, Purchased 2012, NGA 2012.749

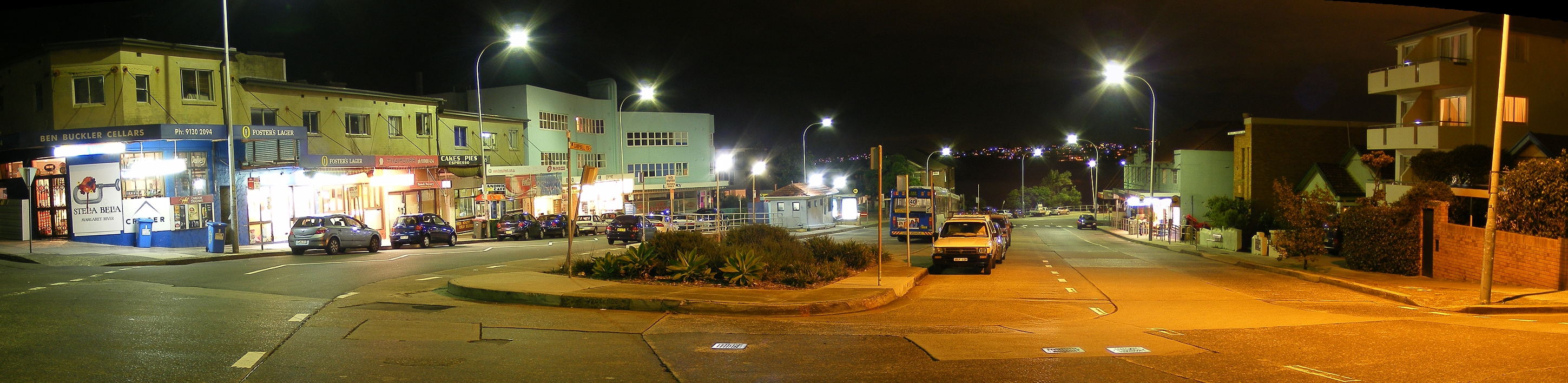
Ben Buckler at night

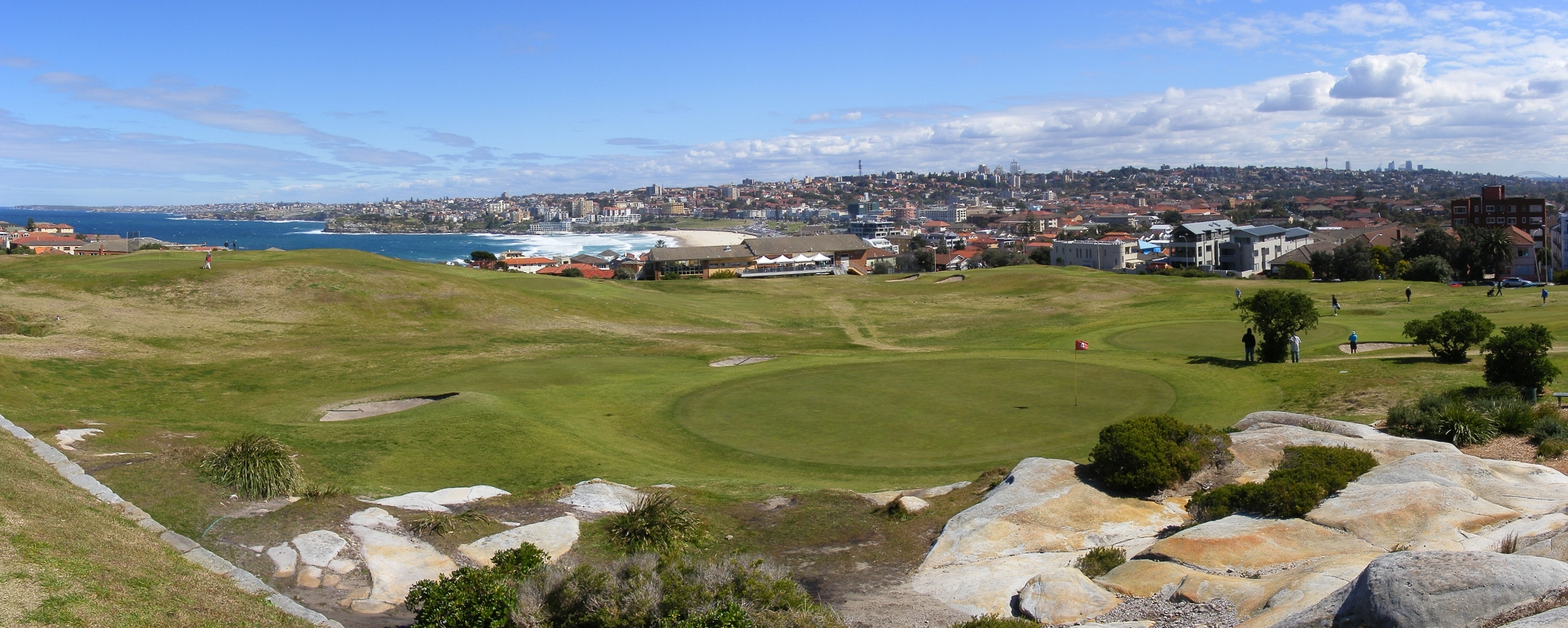
Golf course

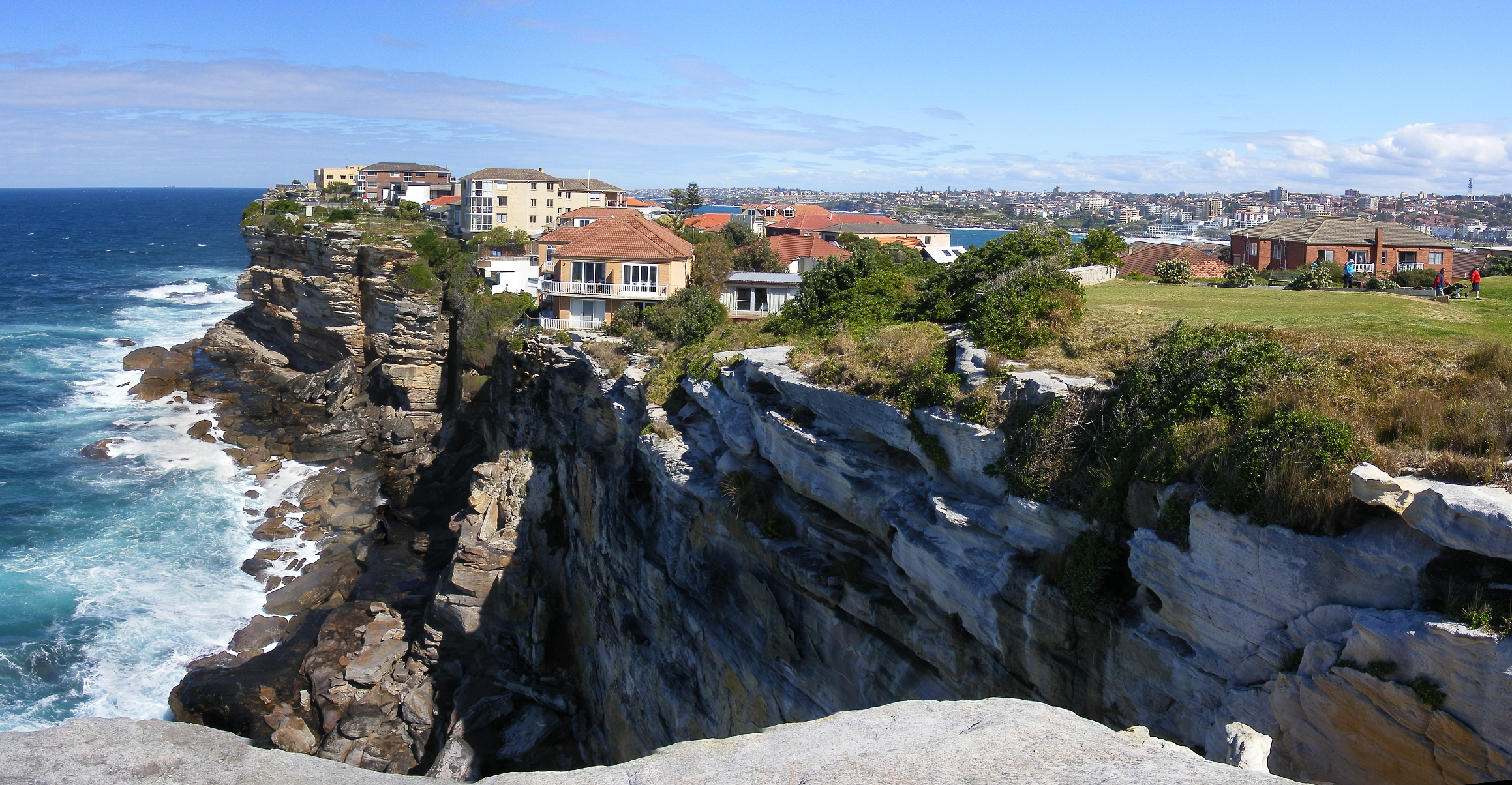
The Ben Buckler coastline

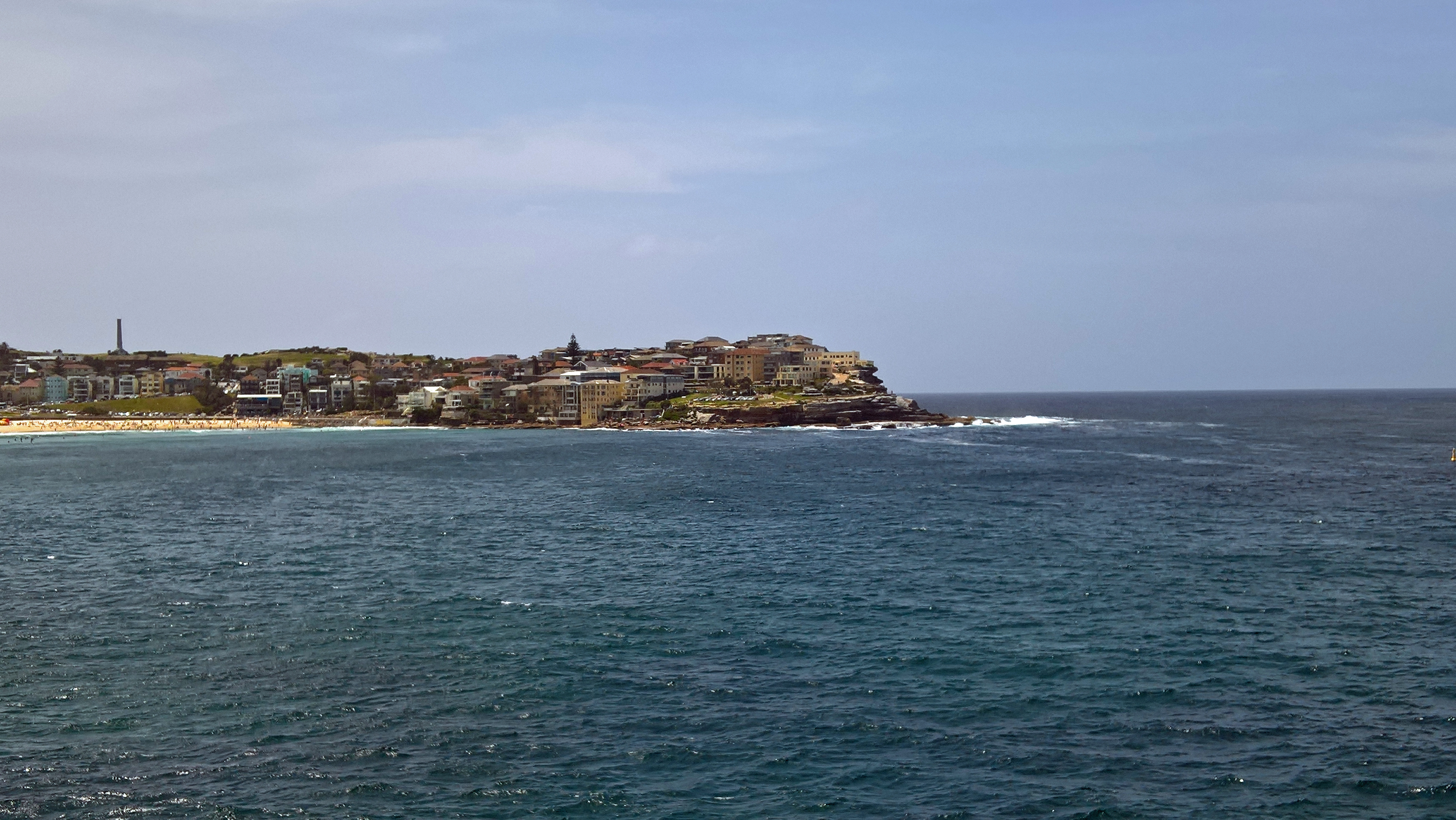
Ben Buckler, from the south. The Bondi Sewer Vent can be seen behind the beach area.
