= Ben Buckler Gun Battery =

- Ben Buckler, Sydney, New South Wales in Australia
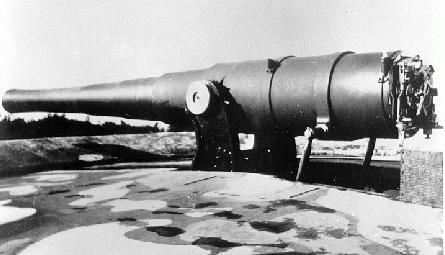
- Disappearing gun at Ben Buckler Gun Battery

Site information
- Type: Disused gun battery
- Owner: Government of New South Wales
- Controlled by: New South Wales State Heritage Register; Waverley Council
- Open to the public: Recreational uses as public open space

Location
- Location in Greater Sydney
- Coordinates: 33°53′03″S 151°17′04″E

Site history
- Built: 1893
- In use: 1893–1950s
- Materials: Concrete, brick, steel
- Fate: Heritage site

New South Wales Heritage Register
- Official name: Ben Buckler Gun Battery 1893, 9.2 Disappearing Gun; Bondi Battery
- Type: State heritage (archaeological-terrestrial)
- Criteria: a., b., c., e., f.
- Designated: 15 December 2006
- Reference no.: 1742
- Type: Battery
- Category: Defence

The Ben Buckler Gun Battery is a heritage-listed fortified former gun emplacement and military installation of the late-Victorian period and now public open space located in the North Bondi locality of Ben Buckler, in the Sydney, Australia. The gun battery was designed by NSW Colonial Government and built during 1893. It is also known as Ben Buckler Gun Battery 1893, 9.2 Disappearing Gun and Bondi Battery. The property is owned by Waverley Municipal Council. It was added to the New South Wales State Heritage Register on 15 December 2006.

== History ==
=== Development of coastal defence fortifications ===
The initial fortifications of Port Jackson were initiated following the arrival of the First Fleet in 1788. The initial batteries were established at Dawes Point, Fort Macquarie and Fort Phillip. Their aim was to defend the colony from vessels that had already entered the harbour. Fears by Britain that its colony could be invaded during the Napoleonic wars led to improvements to the harbour defences. A battery was established at Georges Head around 1801. Following the surprise visit of American warships in 1839, further defences were constructed at Kirribilli, Pinchgut and Bradleys Head. As a consequence of the Crimean War, further improvements were made to Bradleys Head, Middle Head and South Head (1854).

1870 saw the removal of British forces from Australia (the Cardwell reforms), putting the onus on wealthy colonies like NSW and Victoria to assist with defence arrangements. In 1871 a string of works were undertaken at outer and inner Middle Head, Georges Head, South Head, Steele Point and Bradleys Head. However, improvements in armaments led to continual redundancy of the fortifications by the 1880s. Fortifications such as Bare Island (1885 onwards) were a feature of this period. Military advisors such as Scratchley and Jervois advocated new defence priorities which led to the 1890s construction of outer defences in Sydney's eastern suburbs.

The guns established here, including Ben Buckler, were aimed to maximise the new gun technologies of the era, and as a deterrent to hostile attack by increasingly efficient naval vessels. The coastal guns were used in a "counter-bombardment" role – to repel armed ships approaching, passing or bombarding population centres like Sydney. They had to be equal to the power of ship-mounted guns, and were used in association with smaller guns aimed at attacking vessels entering port, and with other harbour defence systems such as mines and torpedo boats. The 23-centimetre (9.2 in) breech-loading gun types were originally designed for the Royal Navy. An 1879 British Ordinance Committee had earlier identified the need for Britain and its colonies to be able to match arms developments such as those of the Imperial German Army and Navy (Krupp guns).

=== The Ben Buckler Battery specifics ===
The three guns that formed the outer defensive circle of Eastern Sydney in the late 1890s were established at Signal Hill Battery in Watsons Bay, Ben Buckler Battery in North Bondi, and Steel Point Battery in Clovelly. The single batteries consisted of a gun pit that incorporated a BL 9.2 inch (234 mm) Mk VI British-made breech-loading Armstrong 'disappearing' gun. The disappearing guns were prevalent at the end of the nineteenth century throughout Britain, its colonies and the United States. They were chosen because of their range and power, and upon firing and recoil, the gun retracted into its concealed pit and was therefore a lesser target to attacking naval vessels. The domed metal shield that covered the gun pit was devised to deflect incoming shells striking the battery.

During the late nineteenth century, ten 23-centimetre (9.2 in) breech-loading "counter bombardment" guns of this type were established in Australia. These comprised three at Sydney's eastern suburb batteries, plus a spare barrel; four in Victoria at Fort Nepean and Queenscliff, and two in South Australia (purchased in 1888). The Adelaide guns were never established into Fort Glenelg but were bought back by the British government in 1915. The Sydney guns were purchased with three hydro-pnuematic mounts and had the following serial numbers: Shark Point: #7317; Signal Hill: #7318; Bondi: #7319, and the spare: #7320. Of these guns, only the Signal Hill, Vaucluse barrel survived on public display at the Royal Australian Artillery Museum at North Fort, North Head before the museum closed in 2010.

The Armstrong Foundry gun at Ben Buckler was cast in 1891 and established within its concrete casemate in 1893. The casemate allegedly had ten-metre (thirty-three-foot) thick concrete walls. Transportation of the gun from the Victoria Barracks, involved a team of thirty-six horses and took three weeks. The gun weighed 20 tonnes (22 short tons) and was installed on an EOC Hydro-pneumatic Mark "1" disappearing mount, operated by hydraulic power. The gun was fired through a slot in the iron "top" shield and could fire a 172-kilogram (379 lb) armour piecing projectile to a range of 8,200 metres (26,900 ft).

A report in the Sydney Morning Herald of April 1908 reported the findings of a Board of Enquiry into the premature firing of the Ben Buckler gun – illustrative of the dangers associated with this technology.

It was not until the 1920s that Australian coastal defence sites began to be re-equipped with modern breech-loading 9.2" naval guns. These comprised the seven two-gun "Mark 10" 9.2" batteries completed by World War II. The new Sydney batteries comprised North Fort at North Head, and the Banks Battery at La Perouse. These sites still exist (minus the guns).

=== Military ordinance disposal ===
The Ben Buckler gun site has survived today through a series of unique events. Obsolete by the outbreak of World War II, the gun was held in reserve. With the Federal military disposal program after the war, the majority of coastal gun fortifications were dismantled. The Australian coastal defence guns were generally offered for sale to be cut up for scrap value. No buyer was obtained for the Ben Buckler gun so it was allegedly buried under direction of Waverley Council in the 1950s, complete with its hydraulic raising mechanism and concrete emplacement works. The work allegedly involved the dumping of five feet of sand into and over the emplacement which was then incorporated into public grasslands.

=== Uncovered briefly in 1984 ===
The gun's existence was forgotten until disturbance by excavation trench works associated with the Bondi Ocean Outfall Sewer in 1984. The exposed top of the concrete casemate was uncovered by mechanical diggers, photographed and surveyed by the (then) Waterboard Authority. The existence of the fortification led to its inclusion in the Waverley Heritage Study commissioned by council in 1990. At that time, the approximate location of the site was added to a modern plan of the Hugh Bamford Reserve. The gun is believed to have been retained within the below-ground level emplacement, although its existence has not been confirmed.

The Ben Buckler gun site survives as a buried archaeological feature.

=== Heritage Office site survey, 2005 ===
The Heritage Office became aware of the gun's existence through a published Information Sheet developed by Waverley Council and Waverley Library for Heritage Week in 1985. Based on the surviving records, the Heritage Office led a remote magnetometer search of the site on 6 April 2005. The site visit involved discussion with Sydney Water who provided modern survey drawings of the oval with an overlay of the suggested location of the gun pit based on the previous exposure of the site in 1984. The survey was assisted by heritage staff at Waverley Council and Rod Caldwell, Project Officer, from the Fort Scratchley Historical Society, Newcastle.

== Description ==
The Ben Buckler gun battery site comprises a rare example of a reinforced concrete gun emplacement, substantially constructed below ground. The gun pit held a Mark "6" 23-centimetre (9.2 in) British-made breech-loading "counter bombardment" British Armstrong "disappearing" gun. The concrete enclosure was revealed by earthworks in 1984 that revealed a circular concrete rim of the "pit" and internal iron casing cover with slot that allowed for the passing of the gun and its recoil. The overall dimensions of the gun pit and associated store rooms, ammunition bunkers, etc., have yet to be sourced through Commonwealth archives.

=== Condition ===
As at 20 April 2005, the 1984 exposure of the top level of the site suggested that the wholly buried structure has retained a significant level of integrity. Annecdotal evidence suggests that the entire concrete casemate, gun and hydraulic mount were left in situ and buried by landfill during the 1950s for the creation of the public open space, the Hugh Bamford Reserve (oval). The site therefore has the potential to retain significant structural remains and fittings associated with the 1893-built structure and later modifications.

The Ben Buckler gun is held in high esteem by military experts as perhaps the best extant example in Australia. It retains the potential to showcase late nineteenth century disappearing gun technology and associated emplacement designs. The battery site has the ability to interpret the changing policy of harbour and coastal defence planning at key centres such as Sydney, reflecting changing technologies, methods of warfare (e.g. attack by armed, armoured cruisers), and changing military doctrine. As only three of these large 23-centimetre (9.2 in) disappearing guns were established in NSW, the Ben Buckler site has the potential to document the principal characteristics of the important class of coastal fortifications of this type.

=== Modifications and dates ===
Constructed 1893. Possible modifications throughout the use of the site culminating in its retention in reserve during World War II.

=== Further information ===
The Ben Buckler site is the only one of three 23-centimetre (9.2 in) coastal batteries established in Sydney with disappearing guns in the late 1890s. It is the only one to have retained significant elements, the others being stripped of armaments and fittings.

Sometime in the 1950s the army vacated the site. The Australian Government was unsuccessful in finding a scrap metal buyer to remove the gun, so it buried the gun and gave the site over to parkland. The gun's existence was forgotten until it was rediscovered in the mid-1990s by Sydney Water Board engineers planning a new pipeline.

In 2010 Waverley Council identified land located adjacent to the battery as a possible site for an industrial depot. The proposal was met with opposition from the community.

== Heritage listing ==
As at 16 February 2009, the Ben Buckler (Bondi) battery site survives as a unique coastal defence battery of the late-Victorian period. Apart from comprising a rare intact concrete 1890s emplacement specifically developed for the then new "disappearing guns" common to the period, the site retains significant archaeological potential due to the probable retention of the original 9.2-inch naval gun and mounting the only complete 9.2-inch example to exist in Australia. The gun battery was one of three large coastal batteries installed in NSW, and demonstrates a change in technologies associated with the advent of fast, powerful armoured ships capable of bombarding coastal centres such as Sydney. The 1890s fortifications along Sydney's eastern suburbs were the culmination of a long period of harbour defence installations reflecting changing policy to meet new technologies, threats and styles of warfare.

Ben Buckler Gun Battery was listed on the New South Wales State Heritage Register on 15 December 2006 having satisfied the following criteria.

The place is important in demonstrating the course, or pattern, of cultural or natural history in New South Wales.

The Ben Buckler gun site is important for its potential to document a phase in the continual evolution of harbour and coastal defences of Sydney. The 1893 emplacement was devised to provide protection from attacking naval vessels by employing state-of-the-art armaments within defensive structures, then available. The site forms a later link to the original defensive policies of colonial Sydney, initially centred on harbour defence batteries, culminating in the significant coastal batteries as armaments allowed for greater range, firepower and pre-emptive attacks on invading forces.

The place has a strong or special association with a person, or group of persons, of importance of cultural or natural history of New South Wales's history.

The Ben Buckler site retains a close bond to the artillery units of colonial NSW who manned and trained at the site. The battery is a reflection of the policies put in place by the NSW colonial authorities following the determination of the British Government to upgrade the colonial defences of the empire post 1870s. The battery's form and armament is a culmination of current military wisdom, based on the advice of leading military British advisors such as Scratchley and Jervois. Their advice and directives led to the continual advancement of the defensive capability of Sydney and its rival colonies, based on the best options to fortify Australian ports in an era of increasing mechanisation and military threat (real or implied).

The place is important in demonstrating aesthetic characteristics and/or a high degree of creative or technical achievement in New South Wales.

The Battery, if found to retain its original 9.2" gun, hydraulic mount, associated movable items, and ancillary rooms and quarters, provides a unique opportunity to document 1890s military technology and defence fortification systems. The potential integrity of these elements is unique in the Australian context and would provide one of the few opportunities for detailed scientific analysis of such a large coastal naval fortification system (9.2") in the world.

The place has potential to yield information that will contribute to an understanding of the cultural or natural history of New South Wales.

Due to the presumed integrity of the reinforced concrete gun pit, associated rooms, and the probability of the entire gun and mechanism being extant, the Ben Buckler battery site has the potential to provide significant insights into late-Victorian defence technologies. The value of the site lies in its burial and retention, in comparison to the two other NSW sites, and those in Queensland, Victoria and South Australia, that have more commonly been decommissioned and stripped of armaments and fittings. In world terms, the Ben Buckler site is important as a comparative example to other British defence facilities established throughout its colonies in the late 1870s – turn of the century.

The place possesses uncommon, rare or endangered aspects of the cultural or natural history of New South Wales.

Due to the presumed integrity of the reinforced concrete gun pit, associated rooms, and the probability of the entire gun and mechanism being extant, the Ben Buckler battery site has the potential to provide significant insights into late-Victorian defence technologies.

== See also ==
- New South Wales State Heritage Register
- Military history of Australia
