= Waverley Council =

- Local government area
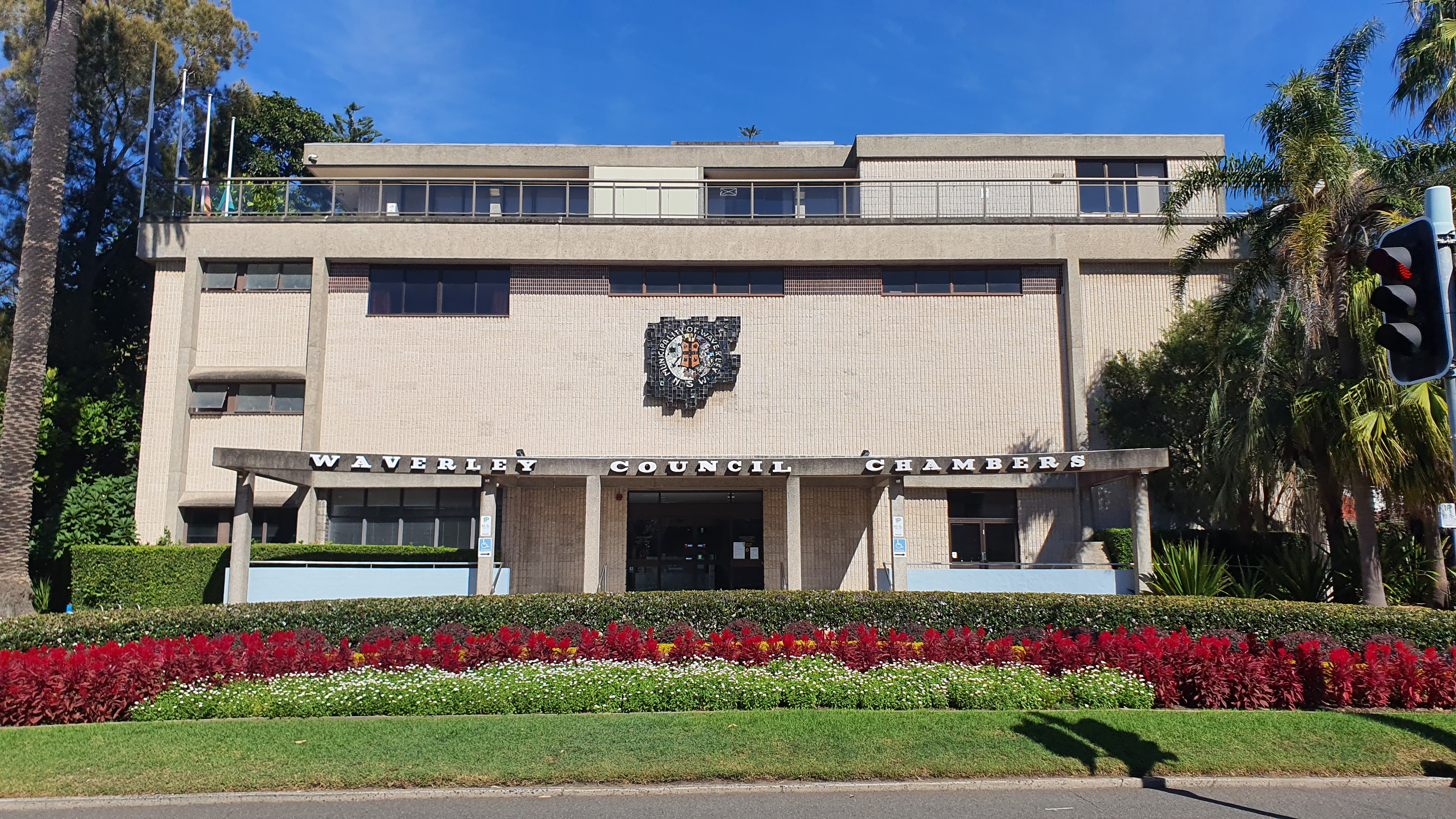
- Waverley Council Chambers

- Interactive map of Waverley Council
- Coordinates: 33°54′S 151°16′E
- Country: Australia
- State: New South Wales
- Region: Eastern Suburbs
- Established: 16 June 1859
- Council seat: Bondi Junction

Government
  - Mayor: Steven Lewis
  - State electorates: Coogee; Vaucluse
  - Federal division: Wentworth

Area
  - Total: 9 km^{2} (3.5 sq mi)

Population
  - Total: 68,605 (2021 census)
  - Density: 7,600/km^{2} (19,700/sq mi)
- Parish: Alexandria
- Website: Waverley Council
LGAs around Waverley Council
Woollahra	Woollahra
Randwick	Waverley Council	Tasman Sea
	Randwick

Waverley Council is a local government area (LGA) in the eastern suburbs of Sydney, in the state of New South Wales, Australia. First incorporated on 16 June 1859 as the Municipality of Waverley, it is one of the oldest-surviving local government areas in New South Wales. Waverley is bounded by the Tasman Sea to the east, the Municipality of Woollahra to the north, and the City of Randwick in the south and west. The administrative centre of Waverley Council is located on Bondi Road in Bondi Junction in the Council Chambers on the corner of Waverley Park.

The elected Waverley Council is composed of twelve councillors elected proportionally across four wards, each electing three councillors. Councillor Steven Lewis has been the mayor of Waverley Council since September 2026.

== Suburbs and localities in the local government area ==
Suburbs within Waverley Council are:

- Bondi
- Bondi Beach
- Bondi Junction
- Bronte
- Clovelly (most is located within City of Randwick)
- Dover Heights
- North Bondi
- Queens Park
- Rose Bay (parts are located within Woollahra Council)
- Tamarama
- Vaucluse (most is located within Woollahra Council)
- Waverley

== History ==
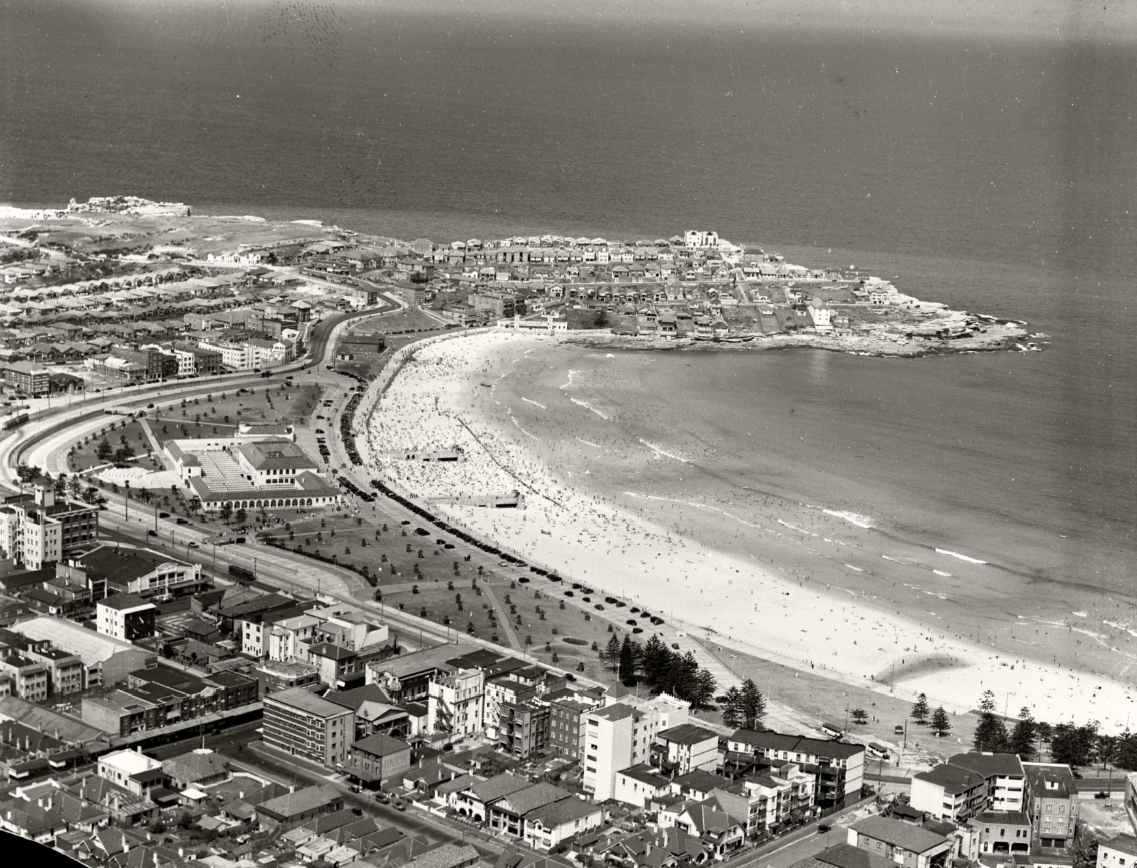
Aerial photo of Bondi Beach and Ben Buckler looking North, 1937.

With the enactment of the Municipalities Act of 1858, which allowed for the creation of Municipalities for areas with over 500 electors, several petitions calling for the incorporation of the Waverley area were received by the Colonial Government and published in New South Wales Government Gazette on 11 November 1858 and 17 May 1859. One of the earliest meetings of local residents formed to call for a "Municipality of Waverley" was held at the Tea Gardens Hotel on Bronte Road on 20 December 1858.

The Governor of New South Wales approved the proclamation establishing the Municipality of Waverley on 13 June 1859, and it was subsequently published in the Government Gazette on 16 June 1859. The first returning officer, Charles St Julian, was appointed to conduct the first meeting of electors a few days later. The first election was held on 14 July 1859, with nine Councillors elected proportionately, and the Council first met on 23 July 1859 at the Tea Gardens Hotel, with John Birrell elected as the first chairman. On 21 February 1860, the council was divided into three wards electing three councillors each: Waverley Ward, Bondi Ward and Nelson Ward. A fourth ward covering the western corner of Waverley, Lawson Ward, was added on 22 April 1887, thereby bringing the number of aldermen to 12.

On 6 October 1944, the recommendation of a 1941 NSW Local Government Department Commission of Inquiry removing the Mill Hill area (37 acres) from the Municipality of Randwick and include it in the Waverley Municipality was proclaimed in the Government Gazette.

=== Council chambers ===
The first council meeting was held on 16 June 1859, but there was no permanent office for the conduct of Council duties some early meetings were held in the Charing Cross Hotel and others in the old School of Arts building in Bronte Road. In December 1860 the Council accepted an offer from Francis O'Brien to donate a site for a Council Chambers on Bondi Road. The cost of building was to be limited to £500, although approximately £700 was eventually spent. The foundation stone was laid in 1861, and a first meeting of Council was held there on 21 November 1861, the first Council building erected by any municipality under the Municipalities Act of 1858.

Discussions were held during the early 1900s over the need for new Council Chambers, and in 1913 a portion of the north-west corner of Waverley Park, which was the first public park in Waverley gazetted in 1880, was dedicated as the site for a new building. A report of the same year stated that the original building was too small for the staff, and had poor ventilation and lighting. It was later sold for £1,600. The new building was completed by the end of 1913, and on 6 January 1914 the Council met for the first time in the new chambers.

Parts of the 1913 chambers still form the shell of the present Council Chambers, although extensive alterations in 1962, and further development in 1976 and 1977 have altered its appearance considerably.

=== 2016–17 amalgamation proposals ===
A 2015 review of local government boundaries recommended that the Municipality of Waverley merge with the Woollahra and Randwick councils to form a new council with an area of 58 square kilometres (22 sq mi) and support a population of approximately 274,000. Following an independent review, in May 2016 the NSW Government sought to dismiss the council and force its amalgamation with Woollahra and Randwick councils. Woollahra Council instigated legal action claiming that there was procedural unfairness and that a KPMG report at the centre of merger proposals had been "misleading". The matter was heard before the NSW Court of Appeal who, in December 2016, unanimously dismissed Woollahra Council's appeal, finding no merit in its arguments that the proposed merger with Waverley and Randwick councils was invalid. In July 2017, the Berejiklian government decided to abandon the forced merger of the Woollahra, Waverley and Randwick local government areas, along with several other proposed forced mergers.

== Demographics ==
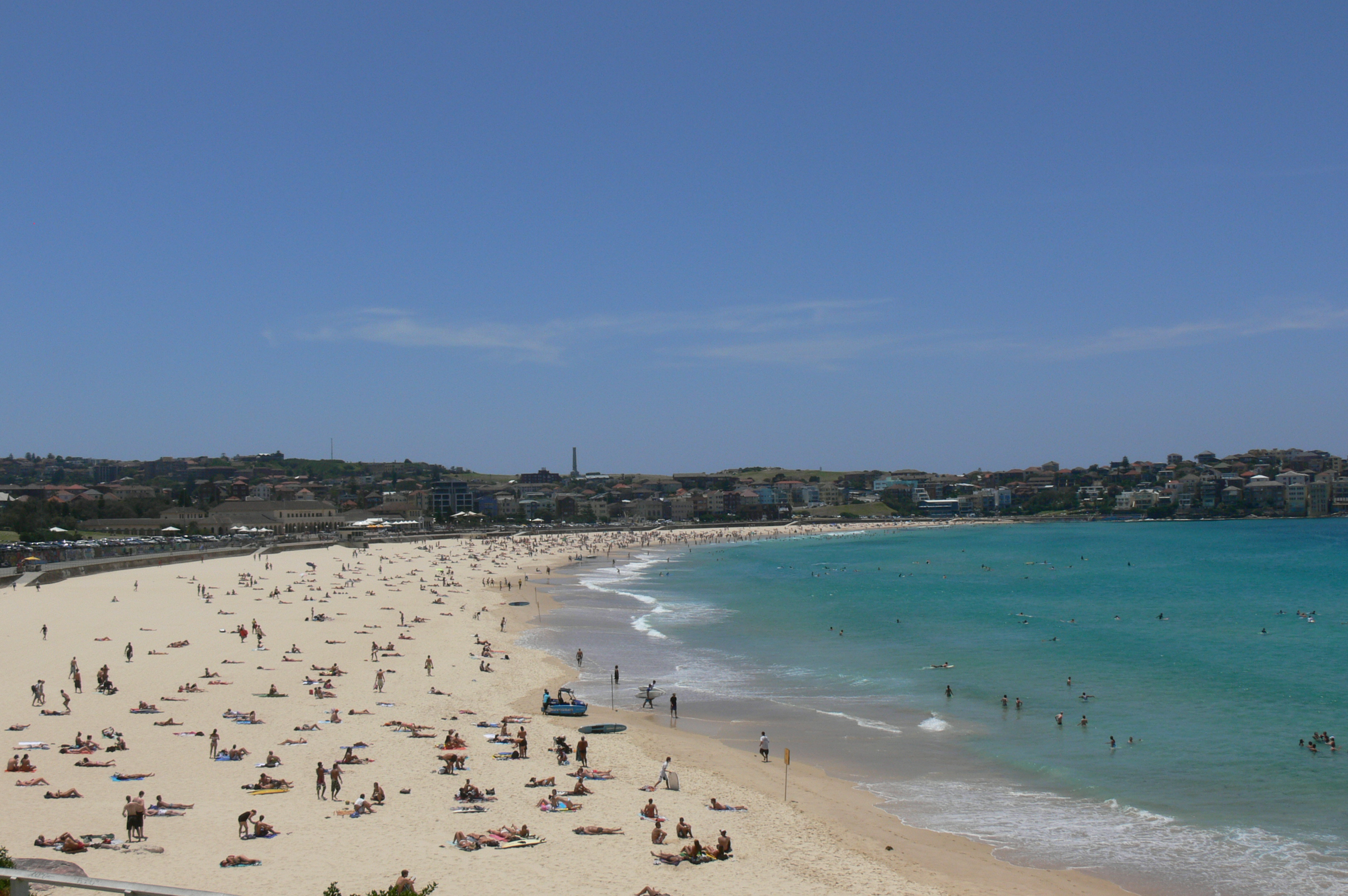
Bondi Beach

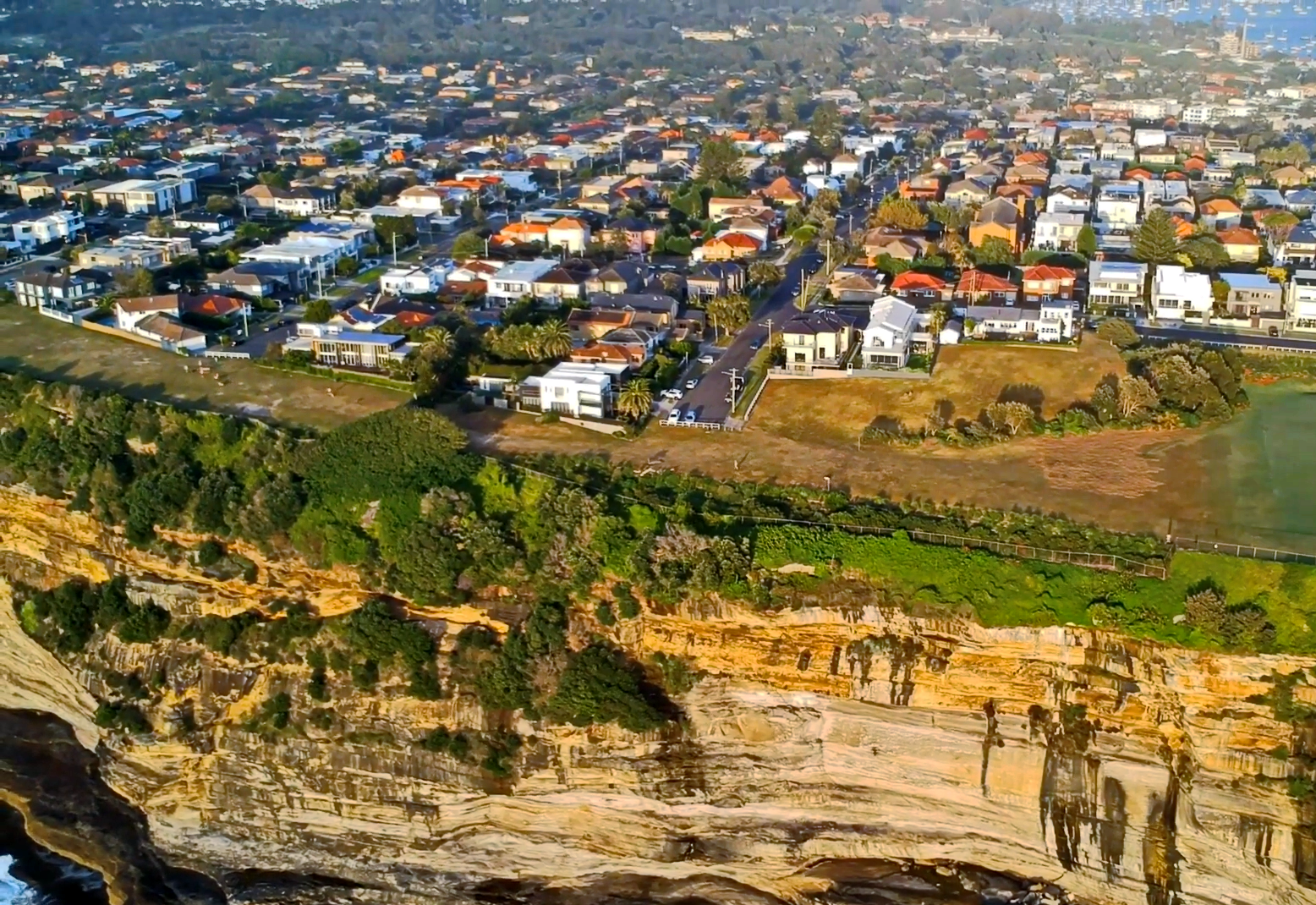
Aerial view of clifftop neighbourhood in Dover Heights.

At the 2021 census, there were 68,605 people in Waverley, of these 48.5% were male and 51.5% were female. Aboriginal and Torres Strait Islander people made up 0.4% of the population. The median age of people in Waverley Council was 35 years. Children aged 0 – 14 years made up 15.7% of the population and people aged 65 years and over made up 12.9% of the population. Of people in the area aged 15 years and over, 35.8% were married and 9.6% were either divorced or separated.

Population growth in Waverley Council between the 2011 Census and the 2016 Census was 4.97%; and in the subsequent five years to the 2021 Census, population growth was 2.61%. When compared with total population growth of Australia for the same periods, being 8.09% and 7.94% respectively, population growth in the Waverley local government area was a third of the national average. The median weekly income for residents within the Municipality of Waverley was more than 1.6 times the national average.

The proportion of residents in Waverley who stated their ancestry was Jewish was three times the New South Wales and national averages. The proportion of households where Russian is spoken at home is thirteen times the state and national averages; and of all households where Hebrew is spoken in New South Wales, one third are located in Waverley, and in Australia, one tenth of households where Hebrew is spoken are located in Waverley. The proportion of residents who stated an affiliation with Judaism was in excess of twenty-eight times the state and national averages.

Selected historical census data for Waverley local government area
Census year		2001	2006	2011	2016	2021
Population	Estimated residents on census night	58,769	▲60,715	▲63,487	▲66,812	▲68,605
Population	LGA rank in terms of size within New South Wales			36th		
Population	Percentage of New South Wales population	0.9%	▼0.9%	0.9%	▼0.8%	0.8%
Population	Percentage of Australian population	0.3%	0.3%	0.3%	▼0.2%	0.2%
Population	Estimated ATSI population on census night	199	▼196	▲245	▲270	▲279
Population	Percentage of ATSI population to all residents	0.3%	0.3%	0.3%	▲0.4%	0.4%
Cultural and language diversity						
Ancestry, top responses	English			20.9%	▲21.2%	▲30.8%
Ancestry, top responses	Australian			16.1%	▼15.3%	▲21.3%
Ancestry, top responses	Irish			9.3%	▼8.9%	▲12.0%
Ancestry, top responses	Scottish			5.5%	▼5.4%	▲7.7%
Ancestry, top responses	Italian				3.6%	▲5.7%
Language used at home, top responses (other than English)	Russian	3.2%	▼2.6%	2.6%	▼2.2%	▼1.9%
Language used at home, top responses (other than English)	Spanish	n/c	1.0%	▲1.3%	▲2.1%	▲2.9%
Language used at home, top responses (other than English)	Portuguese	n/r	n/r	n/r	1.9%	▼1.8%
Language used at home, top responses (other than English)	French	n/c	n/c	1.3%	▲1.8%	▲1.9%
Language used at home, top responses (other than English)	Italian	1.5%	▲1.3%	▲1.4%	▲1.7%	▲1.6%
Religious affiliation						
Religious affiliation, top responses	No religion, so described	16.9%	▲18.0%	▲24.3%	▲33.4%	▲41.4%
Religious affiliation, top responses	Catholic	22.9%	▼20.8%	▲22.1%	▼19.9%	▼18.8%
Religious affiliation, top responses	Judaism	16.1%	▲16.8%	▲17.1%	▼15.1%	▲16.0%
Religious affiliation, top responses	Not stated	n/r	n/r	n/r	▲14.4%	▼7.6%
Religious affiliation, top responses	Anglican	13.5%	▼11.7%	▼11.0%	▼7.9%	▼6.7%
Median weekly incomes						
Personal income	Median weekly personal income		A$765	▲ A$973	▲ A$1,151	▲ A$1,442
Personal income	Percentage of Australian median income		164.2%	▲168.6%	▲173.9%	▲179.1%
Family income	Median weekly family income		A$1,928	▲ A$2,496	▲ A$2,917	▲ A$3,709
Family income	Percentage of Australian median income		134.1%	▲168.5%	▼168.2%	▲174.9%
Household income	Median weekly household income		A$1,446	▲ A$1,912	▲ A$2,308	▲ A$2,854
Household income	Percentage of Australian median income		140.7%	▲154.9%	▲160.5%	▲163.4%
Dwelling structure						
Dwelling type	Separate house	17.9%	▲21.2%	▼19.9%	▼16.5%	▼16.0%
Dwelling type	Semi-detached, terrace or townhouse	18.7%	▼16.7%	▲18.8%	▲19.0%	▼18.1%
Dwelling type	Flat or apartment	51.7%	▲61.3%	▼60.5%	▲62.6%	▲64.1%

== Council ==
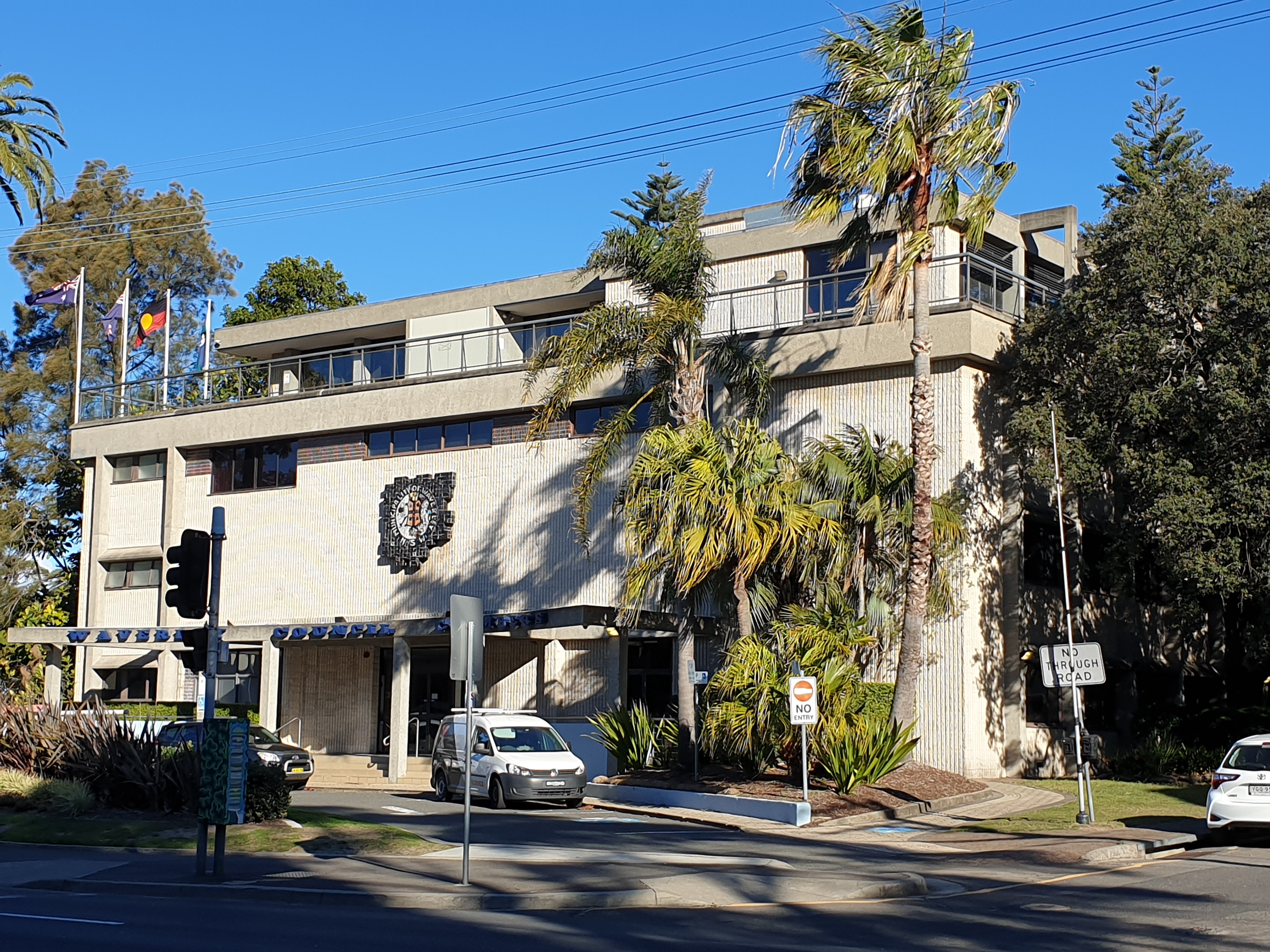
Waverley Council Chambers, Bondi Junction

NSW Local Government Elections are held every four years on the second Saturday of September as stipulated by the Local Government Act 1993.

=== Current composition and election method ===
Waverley Council is composed of twelve councillors elected proportionally from the four separate wards, each electing three Councillors. The mayor is elected by the Councillors at the first meeting of the council for a two-year term, typically in September, while the Deputy Mayor is elected annually by the councillors. The most recent election for the council was held on 14 September 2024, and the makeup of the council is as follows:

Party	Councillors
Liberal Party of Australia	5
Australian Labor Party	3
The Greens	2
Independent	2
Total	12

The current Council, elected in 2024, in order of election by ward, is:

Ward	Councillor	Party	Notes
Bondi Ward	Michelle Stephenson	Liberal	
Bondi Ward	Dominic Wy Kanak	Greens	Elected 1999; Deputy Mayor 2007–2008, 2017–2019.
Bondi Ward	Margaret Merten	Labor	
Hunter Ward	William Nemesh	Liberal	Mayor 2024–2026.
Hunter Ward	T (Dov) Frazer	Liberal	
Hunter Ward	Steven Lewis	Independent	Elected 2017 as Labor Party member; Mayor 2026–present.
Lawson Ward	Paula Masselos	Labor	Elected 2012; Mayor 2019–Oct 2024.
Lawson Ward	Katherine Westwood	Liberal	
Lawson Ward	Lauren Townsend	Independent	Elected 2024 as Liberal Party member
Waverley Ward	Joshua Spicer	Liberal	
Waverley Ward	Ludovico Fabiano	Greens	Deputy Mayor Sep–Oct 2023.
Waverley Ward	Keri Spooner	Labor	

== Election results ==
=== 2024 ===
2024 New South Wales local elections: Waverley
Party	Votes	%	Swing	Seats	Change
Liberal	16,767	51.3%	+2.3%	6	▲1
Labor	6,487	19.8%	−7.4%	3	▼1
Greens	5,465	16.7%	−6.5%	2	▼1
Independents	3,988	12.2%	+11.6%	1	▲1
Formal votes	32,707	96.04%			
Informal votes	1,347	3.96%			
Total	34,054	100.00%		15	

== Mayors ==
Mayor of Waverley
- Incumbent; William Nemesh since 10 October 2024
- Style: His/Her Worship the Mayor Councillor
- Appointer: Waverley Council
- Term length: Two years, renewable indefinitely (2017–present) One year (1859–2016)
- Inaugural holder: John Birrell (Chairman); David Fletcher (Mayor)
- Formation: 23 July 1859 (Chairman); 17 February 1868 (Mayor)
- Deputy: Keri Spooner

Chairman	Party	Term	Notes
John Birrell	No party	23 July 1859 – 17 February 1860	
James Vickery	No party	17 February 1860 – 19 February 1861	
Charles St Julian	No party	19 February 1861 – 13 February 1862	
Edmond John Baily	No party	13 February 1862 – 29 May 1862	
Charles Browne	No party	17 June 1862 – 16 February 1863	
John Crone Raymond	No party	16 February 1863 – 29 October 1863	
Charles Simmons	No party	29 October 1863 – 20 February 1864	
William Barker	No party	20 February 1864 – 14 February 1865	
John Birrell	No party	14 February 1865 – 22 February 1866	
Stephen Dickson	No party	22 February 1866 – 13 February 1867	
Charles Kelso Moore	No party	13 February 1867 – 17 February 1868	
Mayor	Party	Term	Notes
David Fletcher	No party	17 February 1868 – 15 February 1869	
Stephen Dickson	No party	15 February 1869 – 15 February 1870	
Robert Yeend	No party	15 February 1870 – 14 February 1871	
William Cary	No party	14 February 1871 – 13 February 1872	
John Macpherson	No party	13 February 1872 – 11 February 1873	
Stephen Dickson	No party	11 February 1873 – 12 February 1874	
William Henderson	No party	12 February 1874 – 26 February 1875	
John Macpherson	No party	26 February 1875 – 13 February 1883	
William Henry Simpson	No party	13 February 1883 – 9 February 1886	
William Martin	No party	9 February 1886 – 11 February 1887	
Thomas James Dickson	No party	11 February 1887 – 12 February 1889	
Alfred Charles Hewlett	No party	12 February 1889 – 13 February 1890	
Frank Guest	No party	13 February 1890 – 10 February 1891	
William Henry Simpson	Independent	10 February 1891 – 21 February 1893	
William T. Ball	Independent	21 February 1893 – 13 February 1895	
Alfred Charles Hewlett	Independent	13 February 1895 – 14 May 1897	
Gustavius John Waterhouse	Independent	14 May 1897 – 15 February 1899	
Watkin Wynne	Independent	15 February 1899 – 14 February 1900	
Harry Charles Evans	Independent	14 February 1900 – 5 March 1901	
Walter Carter	Independent	5 March 1901 – 11 February 1903	
William John Blunt	Independent	11 February 1903 – February 1904	
Joseph Cuthbert Kershaw	Independent	11 February 1904 – 28 November 1905	
John Walter Alldis	Independent	1 December 1905 – 13 February 1906	
Robert George Watkins	Independent	13 February 1906 – 7 February 1911	
John Campbell	Independent	7 February 1911 – 27 August 1912	
Leslie James Lamrock	Independent	27 August 1912 – February 1914	
Joseph Barracluff	Independent	February 1914 – 8 February 1916	
Leslie James Lamrock	Independent	8 February 1916 – 14 December 1916	
Henry William Frederick Rogers	Independent	19 December 1916 – February 1920	
Cornelius William Kavanagh	Independent	February 1920 – December 1925	
Robert William Jackaman	Independent	December 1925 – December 1927	
David Hunter	Independent	December 1927 – 5 January 1932	
Charles Fenton	Independent	5 January 1932 – December 1932	
Francis Hamilton Frith	Independent	December 1932 – December 1933	
William Howe	Independent	December 1933 – 30 January 1934	
James Wadsley Rupert Fieldhouse	Independent	26 February 1934 – 6 March 1934	
David Hunter	Independent	6 March 1934 – December 1935	
Raymond Nott	Independent	December 1935 – December 1936	
James Wadsley Rupert Fieldhouse	Independent	December 1936 – December 1937	
Raymond Nott	Independent	December 1937 – December 1938	
Henry Samuel	Independent	December 1938 – 14 December 1939	
Thomas Hogan	Independent	14 December 1939 – December 1940	
James Wadsley Rupert Fieldhouse	Independent	December 1940 – December 1941	
Leslie James Fingleton	Independent	December 1941 – December 1942	
Thomas Hogan	Independent	December 1942 – 2 December 1943	
Gordon Anderson	Labor	2 December 1943 – December 1945	
Herbert Sharman	Labor	December 1945 – December 1946	
Gordon Anderson	Labor	December 1946 – December 1948	
Thomas Hogan	Independent	December 1948 – December 1949	
Thomas John Conway	Independent	December 1949 – December 1950	
Keith Harris Weekes	Independent	December 1950 – December 1951	
William Aston	Independent	December 1951 – December 1953	
Carl Jeppesen		December 1953 – December 1956	
Keith W. Anderson		December 1956 – December 1958	
Dudley G. Page	Independent	December 1958 – December 1959	
Jack Cole	Independent	December 1959 – December 1960	
Ray M. O'Keefe	Independent	December 1960 – December 1962	
Doug J. Morey		December 1962 – December 1965	
Ernie Page	Labor	December 1965 – December 1967	
Doug T. Sutherland	Independent	December 1967 – December 1968	
Ray A. Farrelly		December 1968 – September 1970	
Doug J. Morey		September 1970 – September 1972	
Ernie Page	Labor	September 1972 – September 1973	
James R. Markham	Independent	September 1973 – September 1974	
Avrom Yossef Singer		September 1975 – September 1976	
David Anthony Taylor		September 1976 – September 1977	
Ernie Page	Labor	September 1977 – September 1983	
James R. Markham	Independent	September 1983 – September 1984	
Ray J. Collins	Independent	September 1984 – September 1985	
John Douglas Morrison OAM	Independent	September 1985 – September 1986	
Carolyn Ann Markham	Independent	September 1986 – September 1987	
Barbara Armitage OAM	Labor	September 1987 – September 1996	
Paul Pearce	Labor	September 1996 – 8 April 2004	
Peter Moscatt	Labor	8 April 2004 – 22 September 2005	
Mora Main	Greens	22 September 2005 – 21 September 2006	
George Newhouse	Labor	21 September 2006 – 20 September 2007	
Ingrid Strewe	Labor	20 September 2007 – 30 September 2008	
Sally Betts	Liberal	30 September 2008 – 22 September 2011	
John Wakefield	Labor	22 September 2011 – 27 September 2012	
Sally Betts	Liberal	27 September 2012 – 26 September 2017	
John Wakefield	Labor	26 September 2017 – 27 September 2019	
Paula Masselos	Labor	27 September 2019 – 9 October 2024	
William Nemesh	Liberal	10 October 2024 – 15 September 2026	
Steven Lewis	Independent	16 September 2026 – present	

== Town clerks and general managers ==
Officeholder	Term	Notes
William James Hamburger	1859 – 18 October 1859	
William Mortimer	25 October 1859 – 9 February 1872	
Jonathan Wiley	12 March 1872 – 31 December 1875	
William Wiley	1 January 1876 – 10 January 1882	
Robert Thomas Orr	10 January 1882 – 18 May 1897	
John Clubb	29 May 1897	
Arthur Kyron	February 2014 – 29 April 2016	
Peter Brown	29 April 2016 – 15 February 2017	
Cathy Henderson (acting)	15 February 2017 – 14 February 2018	
Peter Monks (acting)	14 February 2018 – 20 March 2018	
Ross McLeod	20 March 2018 – 26 February 2021	
Emily Scott	26 February 2021 – present	

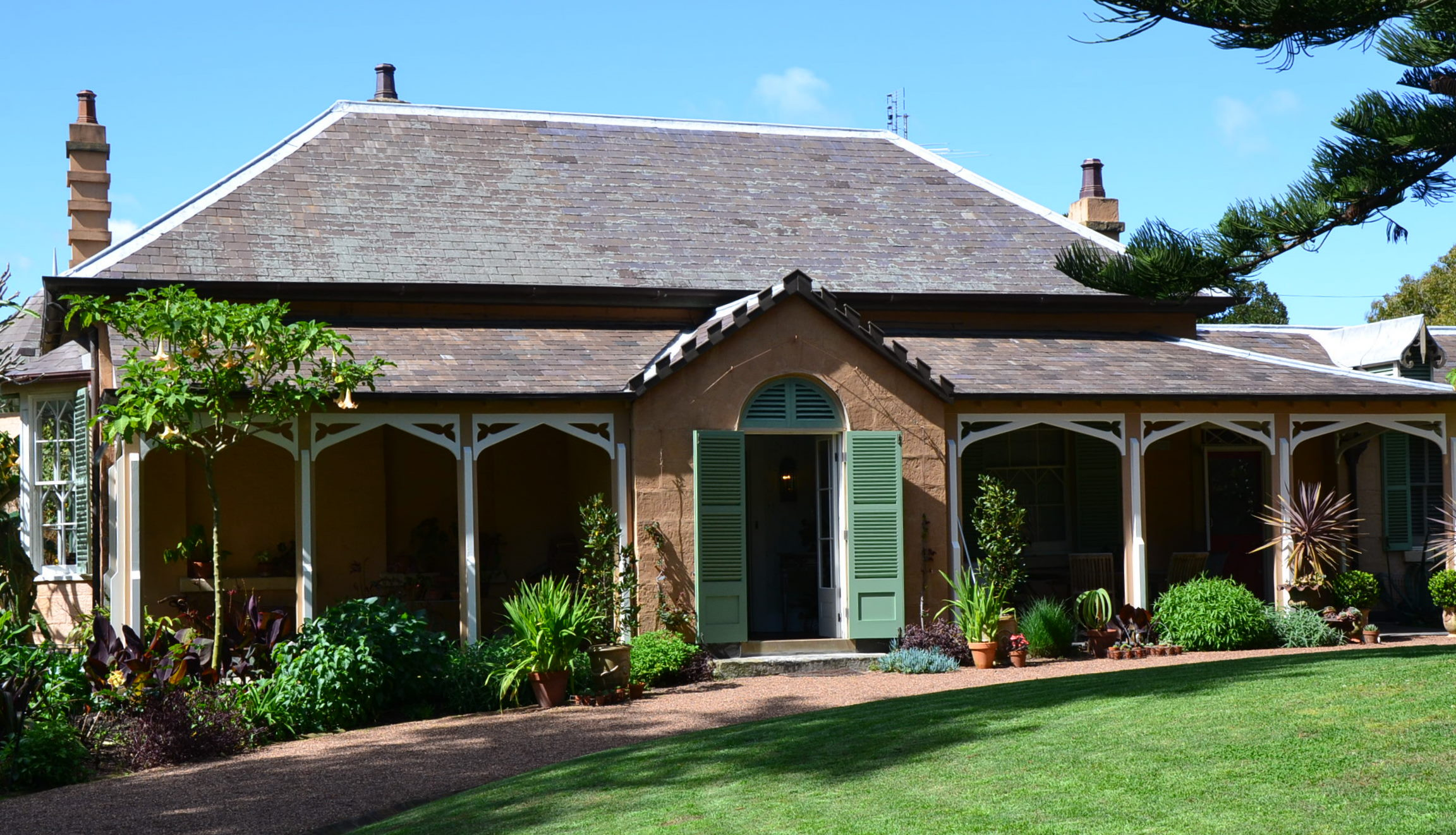
Bronte House is owned by Waverley Council.

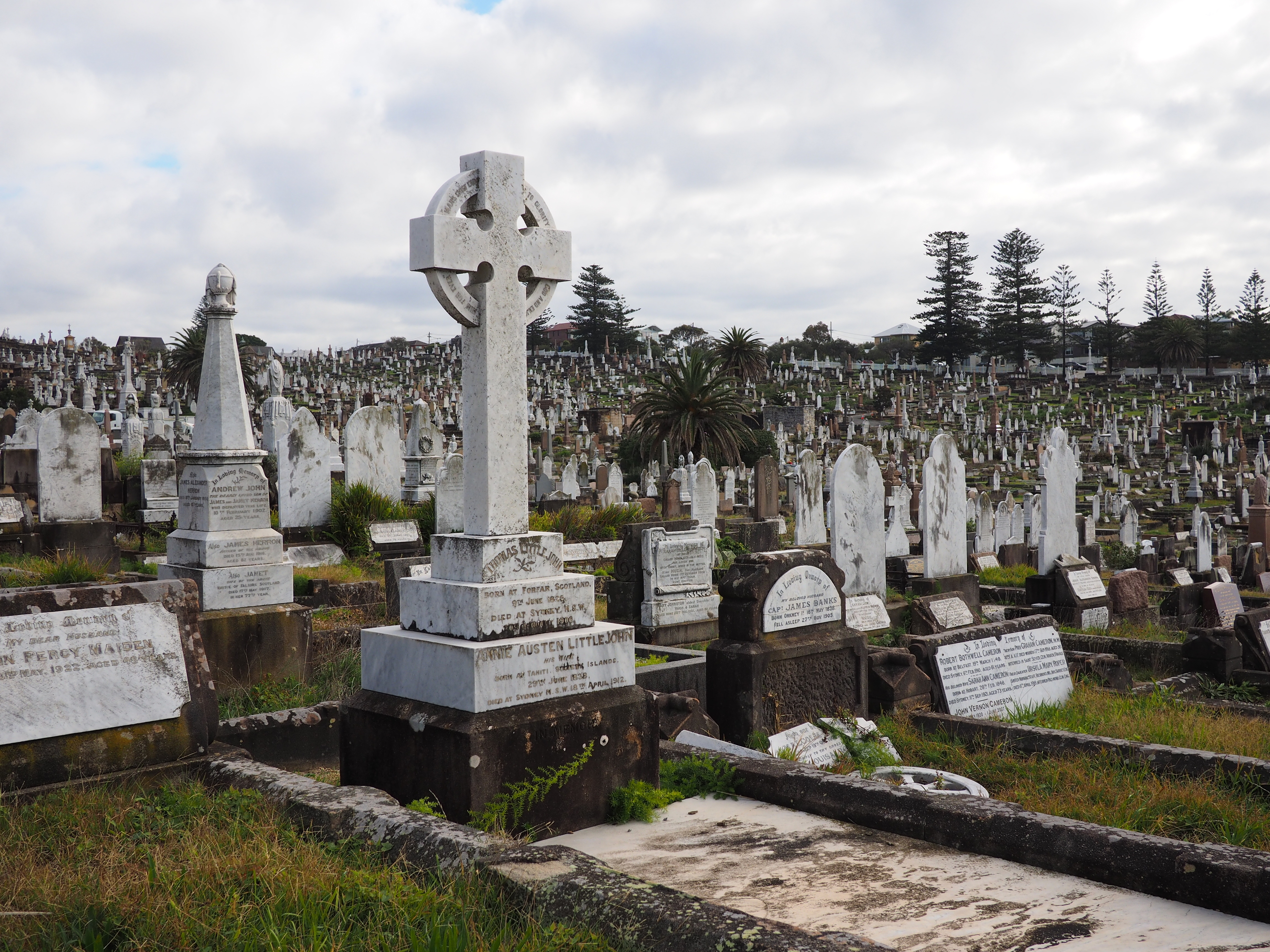
Waverley Cemetery is owned and managed by Waverley Council.

== Heritage listings ==
The Waverley Council area has a number of heritage-listed items and conservation areas, including those listed on the New South Wales State Heritage Register:

- Bondi, 36 Anglesea Street: Electricity Substation No. 269
- Bondi, Blair Street: Bondi Ocean Outfall Sewer
- Bondi, 60 Blair Street: St Anne's Catholic Church, Bondi
- Bondi, Military Road: Bondi Sewer Vent
- Bondi Beach, Queen Elizabeth Drive: Bondi Beach Cultural Landscape
- Bondi Junction and Waverley, Paul Street: Waverley Reservoirs
- Bronte, 470 Bronte Road: Bronte House
- Bronte, St Thomas Street: Waverley Cemetery
- North Bondi, Ben Buckler Gun Battery
- Vaucluse, 793 Old South Head Road: South Head General Cemetery
- Waverley, 240 Birrell Street: St Mary's Anglican Church, Waverley
- Waverley, 11 Victoria Street: Charing Cross (homestead)
- Waverley, 45 Victoria Street: Mary Immaculate Catholic Church, Waverley

== The Nib Literary Award ==
The Mark and Evette Moran Nib Literary Award, formerly The Nib Waverley Library Award for Literature, is organised and supported by the council, and the awards ceremony held in Waverley Library each year.
