= Bondi Ocean Outfall Sewer =

- Location within east Sydney Location within Australia
- 33°53′09″S 151°16′53″E
- Location: Blair Street, North Bondi, Sydney, Australia

History
- Built: 1880–1889

Site notes
- Architect: Public Works Department
- Owner: Sydney Water

New South Wales Heritage Register
- Official name: BOOS (Bondi Ocean Outfall Sewer); Main Northern Ocean Outfall Sewer
- Type: State heritage (built)
- Designated: 15 November 2002
- Reference no.: 1623
- Type: Sewage Tunnel
- Category: Utilities – Sewerage
- Builders: Public Works Department

The Bondi Ocean Outfall Sewer is a heritage-listed sewerage infrastructure at Blair Street, North Bondi, Sydney, Australia. The sewer line commences at the intersection of Oxford Street and College Street in Darlinghurst and then travels in a more-or-less easterly direction for 6.1 kilometres (3.8 mi) passing through a number of suburbs until it reaches Blair Street in North Bondi. It was designed and built by the Public Works Department between 1880 and 1889. It is also known as BOOS (Bondi Ocean Outfall Sewer) and Main Northern Ocean Outfall Sewer. The property is owned by Sydney Water.

== Bondi Sewer System ==
By 1859 Sydney's sewerage system consisted of five outfall sewers which drained to Sydney Harbour. By the 1870s, the harbour had become grossly polluted and an alternative means of disposing of the city's sewage was investigated. This led to the construction of the Main Northern Ocean Outfall Sewer and a southern sewer draining to a sewage farm at Botany Bay.

The Main Northern Outfall Sewer (BOOS) was the first ocean outfall sewer to be designed and built in Sydney. At the time when Melbourne was getting its first reticulated sewer, Sydney was diverting its existing sewers from harbour outfalls to ocean outfall. It was a marvel of surveying accuracy for its time which allowed bricking to commence before breakthrough of the tunnel. This system reduced the flow into the harbour sewers, until the introduction of the electric pumping stations. This system was instrumental in reducing the pollution entering the harbour.

The sewer was lined with brick. It is 2.4 by 2.2 metres (7 ft 10 in by 7 ft 3 in) diminishing to 2.1 by 1.8 metres (6 ft 11 in by 5 ft 11 in) at the junction chamber at the corner of junction of Oxford Street and College Street in Darlinghurst. It is from this point that the main branches extended in northerly, westerly and south-westerly directions. Two sections of the system have pitched roofs at the junction of Oxford and College Streets and also at Taylor Square. A number of engineers who worked on the system later worked on other notable landmarks such as T. Keele, L. A. B. Wade (father of dams) and W. C. Bennett (Chief Engineer), who were also both board members.

It is now known that the large volume expansion chamber near the ocean was tunnelled from the ocean end so that the spoil did not need to be hauled to the surface nor trundled along the tunnel under Blair Street. This meant that the extended tunnel could not drain out seepage water. This was dealt with by digging a side drain from Bondi across to Rose Bay to help dry out the wetland/swamp which is now a golf course. The spoil was dumped at the bottom of the cliff face. The remnants of the ladderway by which miners descended was removed c. 1990.

== Description ==
The Bondi Scheme discharges at Ben Buckler into the Tasman Sea in North Bondi. It was constructed as an intercepting sewer to reduce the amount of sewage discharging to Sydney Harbour via the earlier City Council sewers. The sewer rises from Ben Buckler to the major junction chamber at the corner of Oxford, Liverpool and College streets, from which the main branch sewers extend to the city, Darlington, Newtown, Annandale, Leichhardt, Glebe and Balmain. Large sewers junctioning with the outfall sewer were constructed to provide reticulation for East Sydney, Paddington, Woollahra and Waverley. The Bondi sewer is a gravitational system and gradually rises as it extends inland. Consequently, it can only serve land directly above itself. Therefore, after the initial scheme was completed in 1889 a considerable portion of the sewage continued to flow into the harbour. Over time low level pumping stations were added to collect sewage from such areas and pump it to the Bondi Sewer. The Bondi Sewer is oviform in shape and was constructed from brick. The dimensions of the main outfall are 2.4 by 2.2 metres (7 ft 10 in by 7 ft 3 in) and this reduces by decrements to 2.1 by 1.8 metres (6 ft 11 in by 5 ft 11 in) at the major Oxford and Liverpool street junction. Other components of the sewer system include a number of large brick sewer ventshafts and Bondi Sewerage Treatment Plant.

The sewer is substantially intact.

=== Modifications and dates ===
The system was extended to Balmain and Newtown during the late 1890s.

Other components of the system developed over time include the Bondi Sewer Vent, Bellevue Hill Sewer Ventshaft, The Obelisk, Glebe Sewer Ventshaft, and Bondi Sewerage Treatment Plant.

== Heritage listing ==
As at 5 November 2001, the Main Northern Ocean Outfall, or Bondi Ocean Outfall Sewer (BOOS), was the first ocean outfall sewer of its type to be designed and built in the country. It is one of the most significant engineering structures in Australia. It was a marvel of surveying accuracy for its time. The surveying allowed for the lining of the sewer before the tunnelling was completed.

The BOOS reduced the volume of polluted waters entering the harbour and improved the health of the city's residents by moving polluted waters off shore. The construction of the BOOS saw other advances in technology related to the removal of sewerage from the sewers, houses and water courses within the city. These included the improving design and construction of pumping stations to move the sewerage from low-lying areas, construction and research into the safe removal of noxious gases from the sewers, better ways of treating raw effluent, advances in engineering methods and construction for tunnelling across waterways and many more.

The significance of the Sydney's sewerage systems primarily relates to its role in the growth of Sydney and the expansion of municipal services from the turn of the century to the present. The construction in these systems is evidenced in the sewage pumping stations, vents, pipes, tunnels and other associated works which display in their character, a gradual change in architectural style spanning the Federation, Inter-war and post World War II periods. Many of these systems are still in use today with little change to their original fabric. In addition, the development of the major sewerage systems also represented a major advance in the protection of public health of Sydney by reducing the discharge of sewage from inner city areas into Port Jackson.

The system includes the sewers, ventshafts, pumping stations and other associated structures. Many of these features are of aesthetic and cultural significance and have landmark values. Some of these items include nineteen of the first twenty pumping stations, large brick sewer vents at North Bondi, Glebe, Hyde Park and Bellevue Hill. It also includes the construction of the cavern which later housed the treatment plant which began partial operation in 1953.

Bondi Ocean Outfall Sewer was listed on the New South Wales State Heritage Register on 15 November 2002 having satisfied the following criteria.

The place is important in demonstrating the course, or pattern, of cultural or natural history in New South Wales.

By 1859 Sydney's sewerage system consisted of five outfall sewers which drained to the harbour. By the 1870s, the harbour had become grossly polluted and an alternative means of disposing of the city's sewage was investigated. This led to the construction of the Main Northern Ocean Outfall Sewer and a southern sewer draining to a sewage farm at Botany Bay.

The historical significance of the sewerage system primarily relates to its role in the growth of Sydney and suburbs and the expansion of municipal services from the early 1900s to the present. The construction of these systems is evidenced by the sewage pumping stations, vents and other associated works which display in their character, a gradual change in architectural style spanning the Federation, InterWar and Post War periods.

The place is important in demonstrating aesthetic characteristics and/or a high degree of creative or technical achievement in New South Wales.

The vast majority of the sewer is located underground. A section can be observed at the entrance to Bondi STP and at Lough Reserve in Double Bay. It displays a high level of workmanship which is evident in the brickwork. Other features of the system include several large ornate brick sewer ventshafts at Glebe, Bellevue Hill and Bathurst Street in the city. These have substantial landmark values.

The place has a strong or special association with a particular community or cultural group in New South Wales for social, cultural or spiritual reasons.

The development of the main sewerage systems represented part of the advance in the protection of public health in Sydney by collectively reducing the discharge of sewage from Port Jackson via the city's early sewers and divert to the Tasman Sea. As such the system is of high significance to the general community.

The place has potential to yield information that will contribute to an understanding of the cultural or natural history of New South Wales.

Sewerage systems demonstrate a variety of construction styles ranging from sandstone blocks, solid rock and reinforced concrete. The construction of these systems contributed to our understanding of the development and use of these materials in Australia and reflects the technological change in construction to meet the increasing population of Sydney.

Bondi was a masterpiece of surveying accuracy which meant that brick lining was commenced even before tunnel "breakthrough". The Nepean Water Tunnel had been similarly completed by T. W. Keele, but being a water tunnel did not require internal brick lining.

The place possesses uncommon, rare or endangered aspects of the cultural or natural history of New South Wales.

The sewer is unique as the first such system in Australia. Technically significant as it contains important information relating to the construction of earlier sewers.

The place is important in demonstrating the principal characteristics of a class of cultural or natural places/environments in New South Wales.

Represents the first ocean outfall sewer to be built in Sydney. One of only a few oviform outfalls, but the only one discharging into the ocean.

== See also ==
- Bondi Sewer Vent
