= North Bondi =

- Suburb
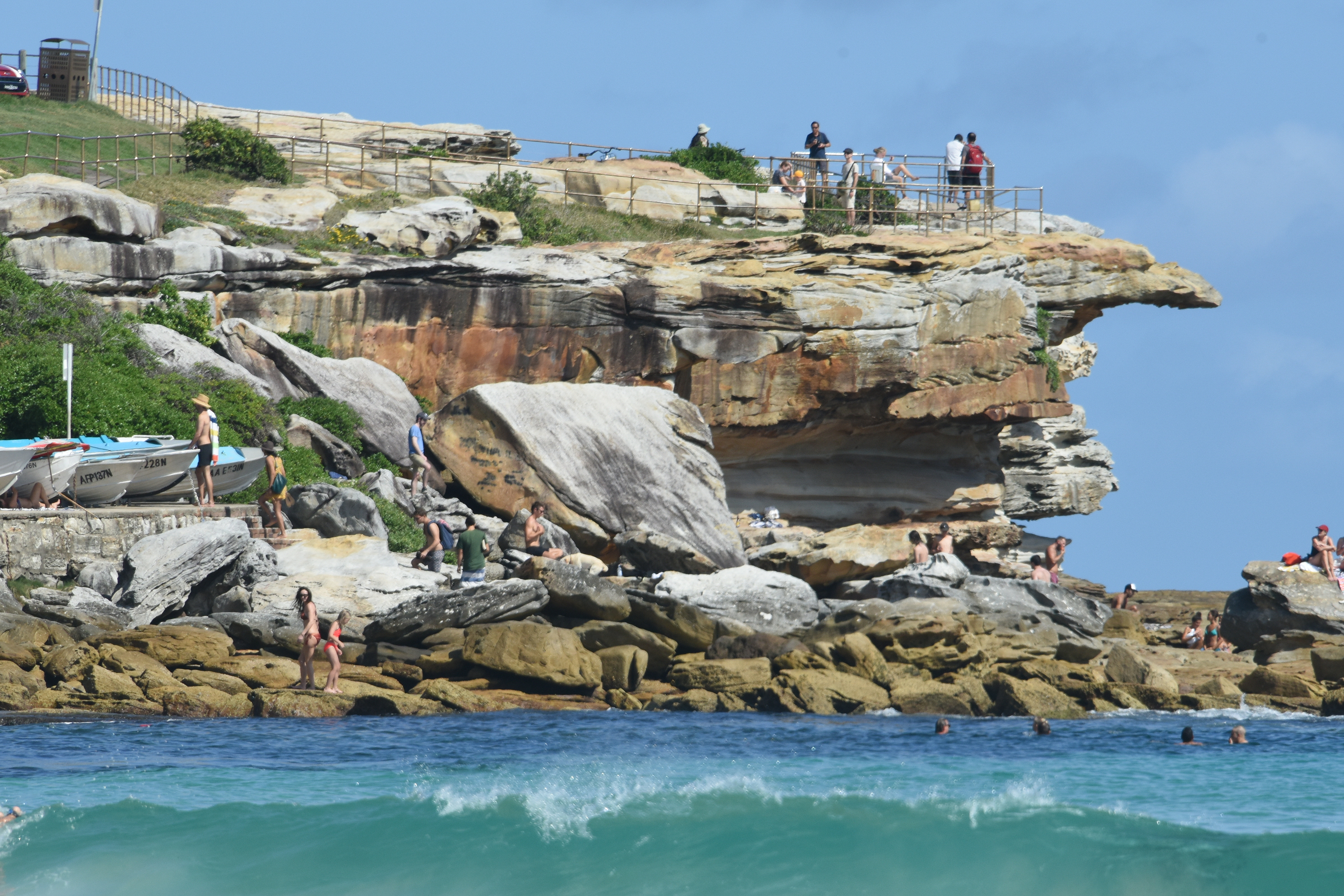
- North Bondi's Ben Buckler

- Interactive map of North Bondi
- Country: Australia
- State: New South Wales
- City: Sydney
- LGA: Waverley Council
- Location: 7 km (4.3 mi) east of Sydney CBD
- Established: 1851

Government
  - State electorate: Vaucluse
  - Federal division: Wentworth

Area
  - Total: 1.26 km^{2} (0.49 sq mi)
- Elevation: 18 m (59 ft)

Population
  - Total: 9,290 (SAL 2021)
- Postcode: 2026
Suburbs around North Bondi
Rose Bay	Rose Bay	Dover Heights
Bellevue Hill	North Bondi	Tasman Sea
Waverley	Bondi Beach

North Bondi is a coastal, eastern suburb of Sydney, in the state of New South Wales, Australia 7 kilometres east of the Sydney central business district, in the local government area of Waverley Council.

North Bondi is a mostly residential area bordering Bondi Beach and the suburb of Bondi, as well as Bondi Junction, the commercial centre. Ben Buckler is a locality in North Bondi.

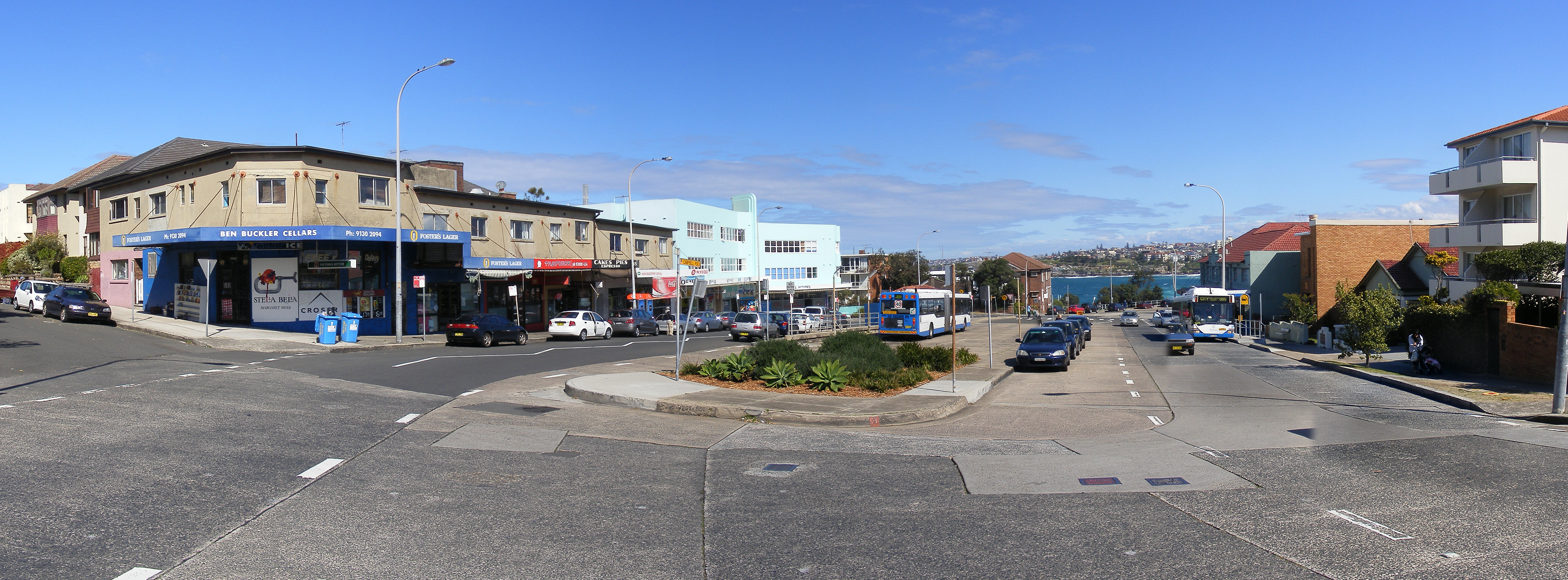
Campbell Parade, North Bondi, the site of the former semi underground tram cutting where trams once terminated

== History ==
Bondi is an Aboriginal word meaning water breaking over rock. It has been spelled a number of different ways over time, Boondi, Bundi, Bundye. Aboriginal rock carvings can still be seen on a rocky surface between the sewerage ventilation shaft near Bondi Golf Course and the cliff.

A nearby group of carvings were done by Europeans; these were examined in 1910 by Lawrence Hargrave, who considered them to be the work of Spanish sailors who arrived in 1595. However, more recent study has suggested that the carvings were in fact the work of quarrymen working at the nearby Murriverie Quarry, and were created between 1890 and 1915.

Another Aboriginal carving can be found at Ben Buckler, the headland immediately east of Bondi Beach. It is approximately a metre long and represents a turtle.

The whole Bondi area was part of an 81-hectare (200-acre) land grant to road-builder William Roberts in 1809. In 1851, Edward Smith Hall, editor of the Sydney Monitor, purchased the land for A£200.

== Heritage listings ==
North Bondi has a number of heritage-listed sites, including:

- Ben Buckler Gun Battery
- Blair Street: Bondi Ocean Outfall Sewer
- Military Road: Bondi Sewer Vent

=== Rathouse ===
On 22 March 1944, original members of the Rats of Tobruk formed the North Bondi Sub-Branch of the Returned & Services League of Australia and it is still known in modern times as Tobruk House or The Rathouse. In 2003, the New York Times ran an article on The Rathouse calling it "an ideal beachside hang out."

=== Ben Buckler Gun Battery ===
The Battery was constructed in 1892 and was intended to protect the colony and the approaches to Sydney Harbour from enemy vessels standing off the coast. During the 1950s the army vacated the premises and the fortification was buried. In the mid-1990s, the site was excavated by Water Board engineers planning to install a new pipeline. The site has been reburied and is currently under Hugh Bamford Reserve.

=== Tram to North Bondi ===
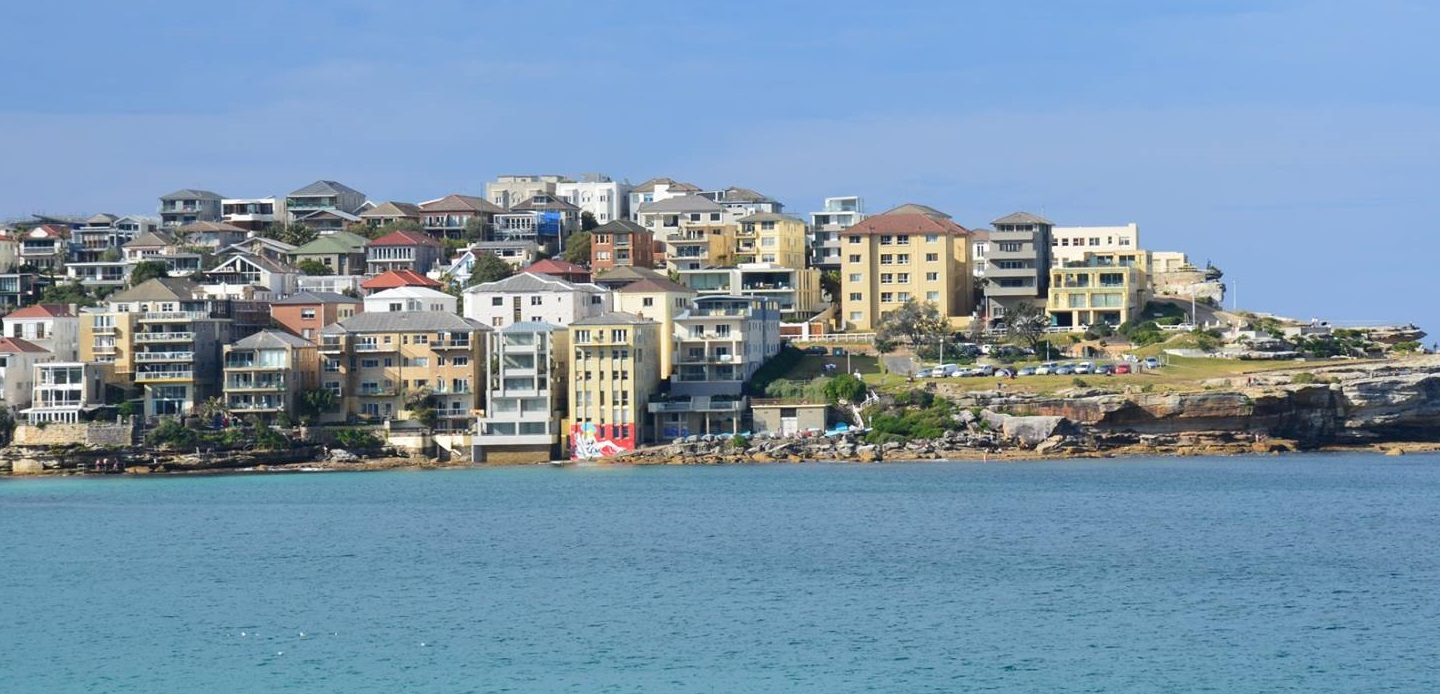
Residential development in North Bondi

Tram services to North Bondi from the CBD operated from either Circular Quay (via Bridge and Elizabeth streets) or Railway Square (via Elizabeth and Liverpool streets), to Oxford Street. The line then passed down Oxford Street to Bondi Junction, where it branched off from Bronte services, to run down Bondi Road to Fletcher Street, Campbell Parade and then to the North Bondi tram terminus. A feature of this line was the large three track terminus cut into a hillside at North Bondi, which opened in 1946, as well as an underpass at 331a Bondi Road. Trams entered onto Campbell Parade via the under pass at a point where Bondi Road was too steep. The underpass and cutting have now been filled in, part of which is now public reserve and units.

The line opened in 1884 as a steam tramway to Bondi, then to Bondi Beach in 1894. Electric services commenced in 1902. The line closed in 1960. The tram line followed the current route of bus route 333 as far as North Bondi.

The service also travelled via Paddington and Bellevue Hill. Heading south down Elizabeth Street from Circular Quay, the line turned left into Park Street, then wound through East Sydney. A feature was the tram only viaduct over Barcom Avenue and Boundary Street in Darlinghurst as the line headed into MacDonald Street. This viaduct is now a road bridge. The line then travelled to Paddington and down Curlewis Street in Bondi to join the Bondi Beach via the Bondi Junction line on Campbell Parade, to the North Bondi terminus. The line follows approximately the current route of bus route 379.

== Population ==
In the 2021 census, there were 9,290 people in North Bondi. A total of 58.3% of people were born in Australia. The next most common countries of birth were England 7.8%, South Africa 5.8%, New Zealand 2.0%, the United States of America 1.7% and France 1.3%. A total of 77.5% of people spoke only English at home. Other languages spoken at home included Spanish 2.2%, French 1.8%, Italian 1.8%, Hebrew 1.8% and Portuguese 1.3%. The most common responses for religion were No Religion 40.8%, Judaism 22.1%, Catholic 16.2% and Anglican 6.3%.

== Landmarks ==
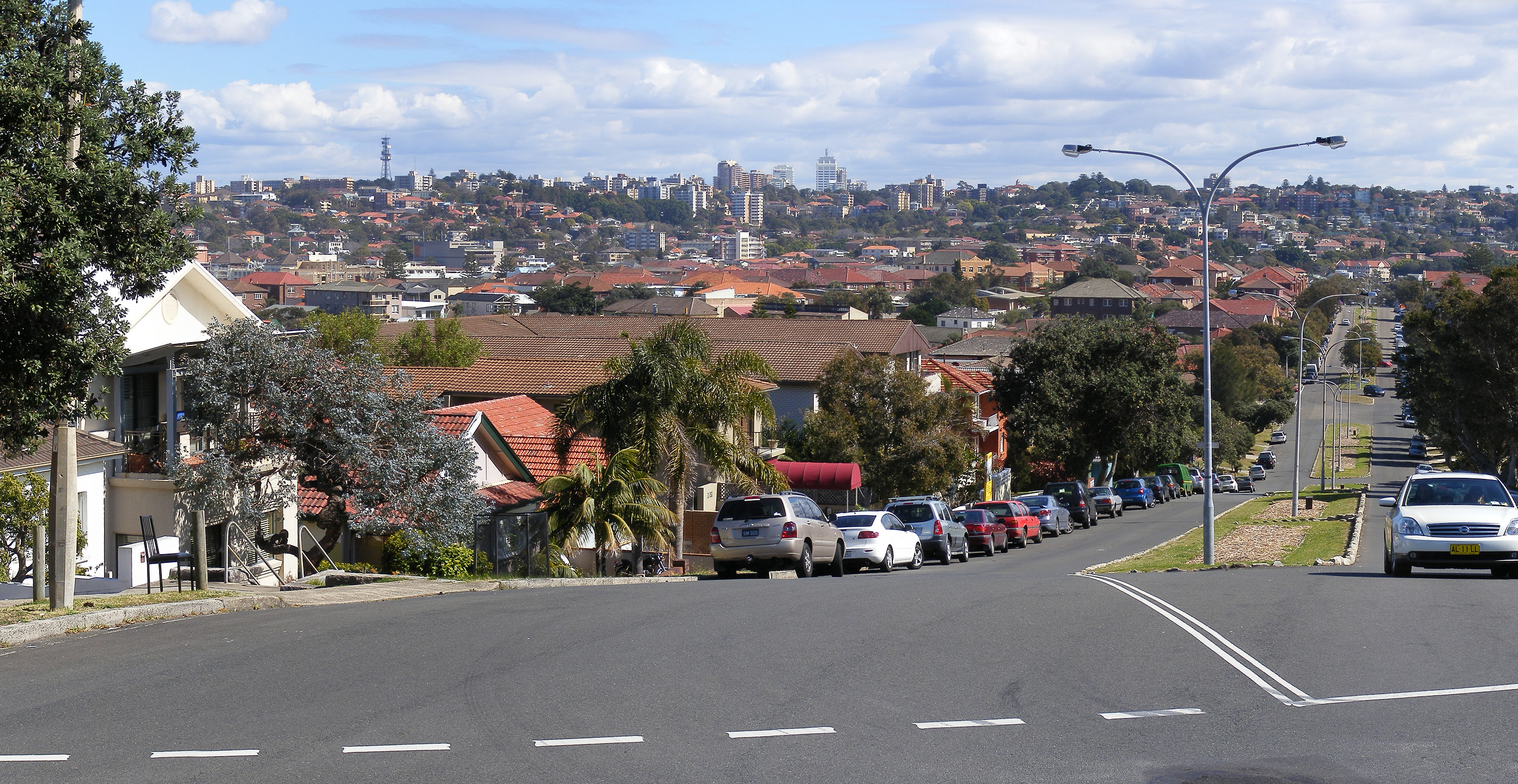
Residential area in North Bondi

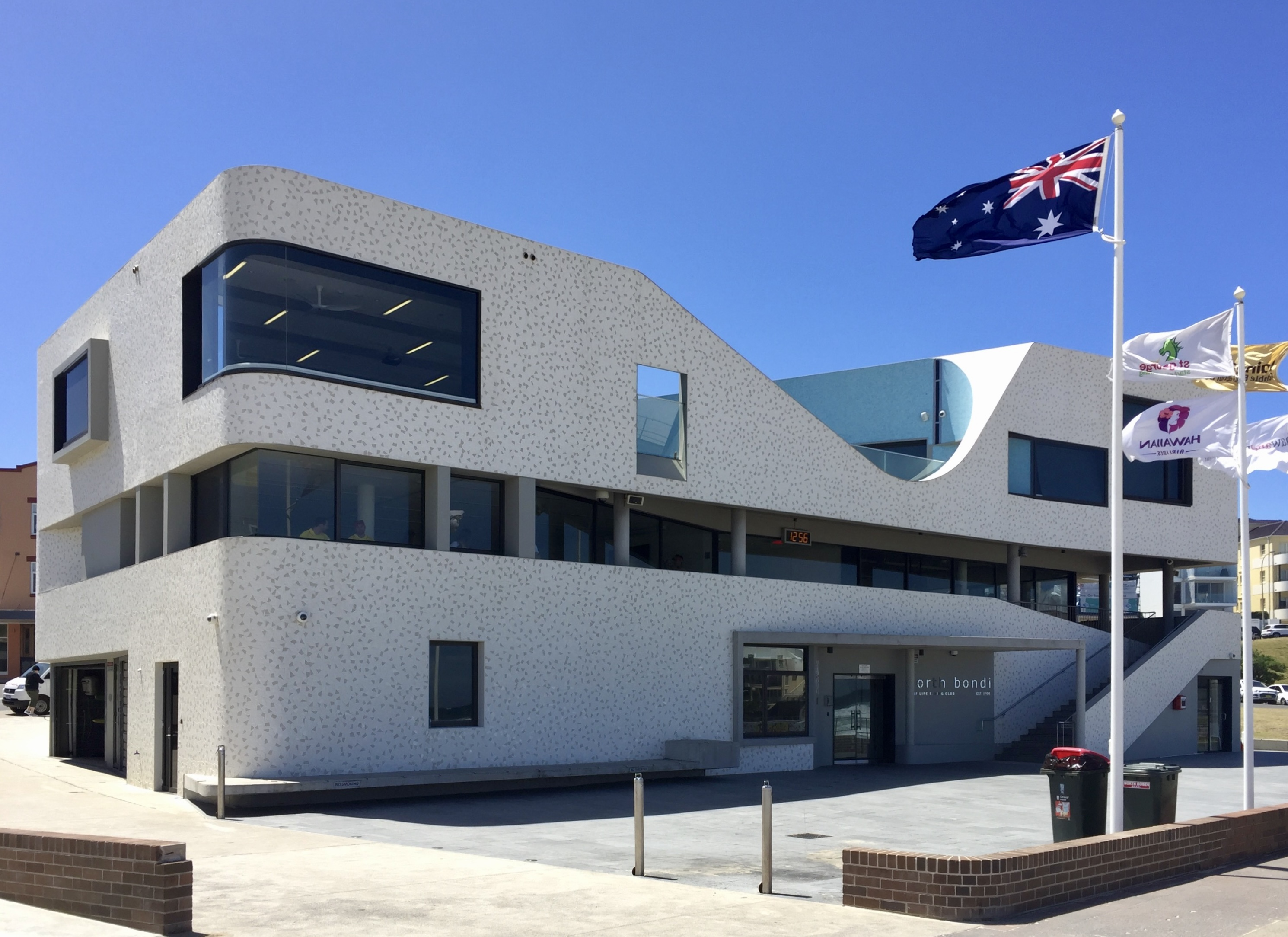
North Bondi Surf Life Saving Club

- Bondi Golf & Diggers Club sits on the coast, east of Military Road.
- North Bondi Surf Life Saving Club sits beside the beach in Biddigal Reserve.
- St Anne's Catholic Church

== Sport and recreation ==
Since 1908, North Bondi has been represented in one of Australia's most popular sporting competitions, the National Rugby League, by the Sydney Roosters, officially known as the Eastern Suburbs District Rugby League Football Club.

== Gallery ==
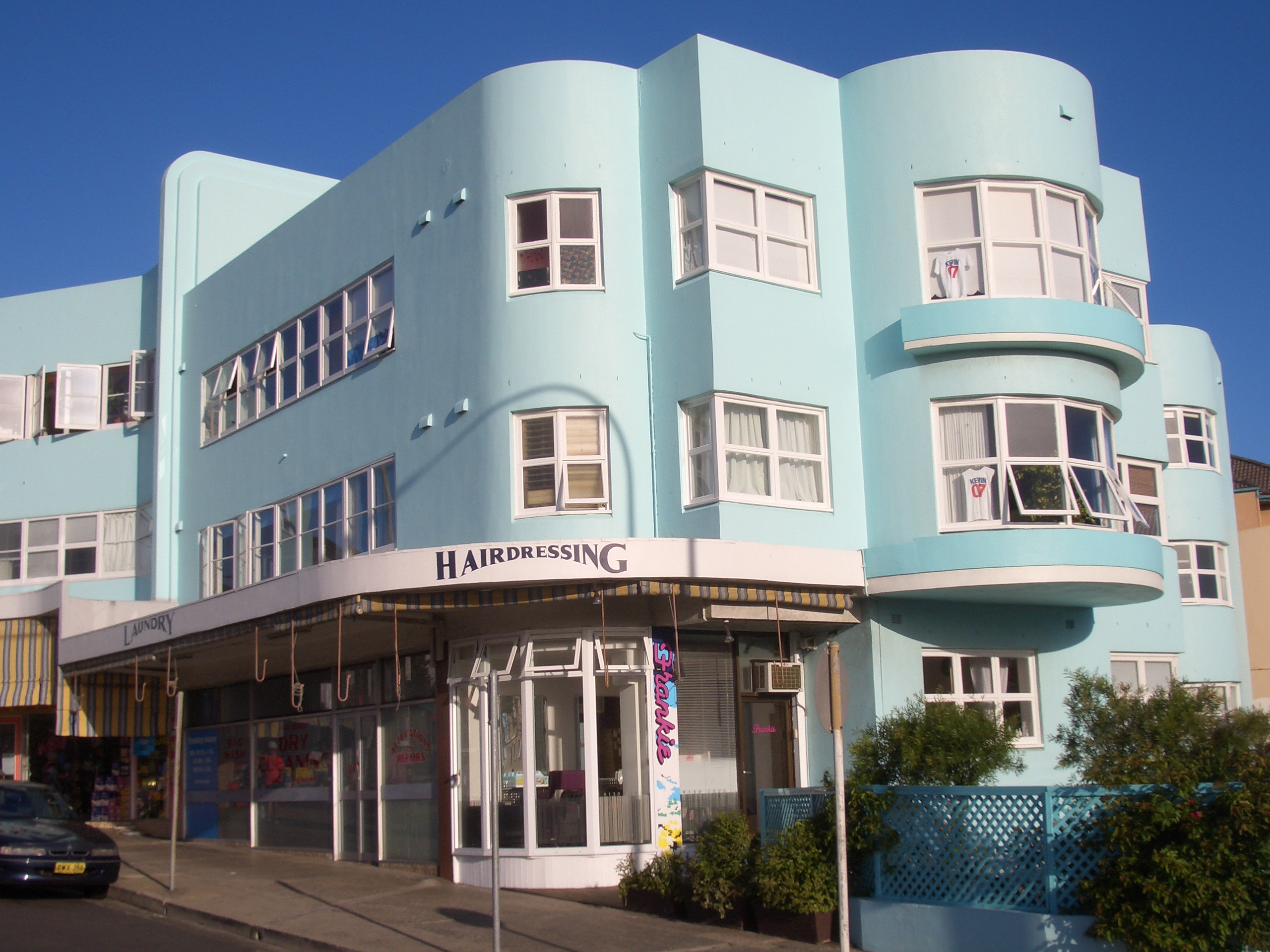
Art Deco shops and flats

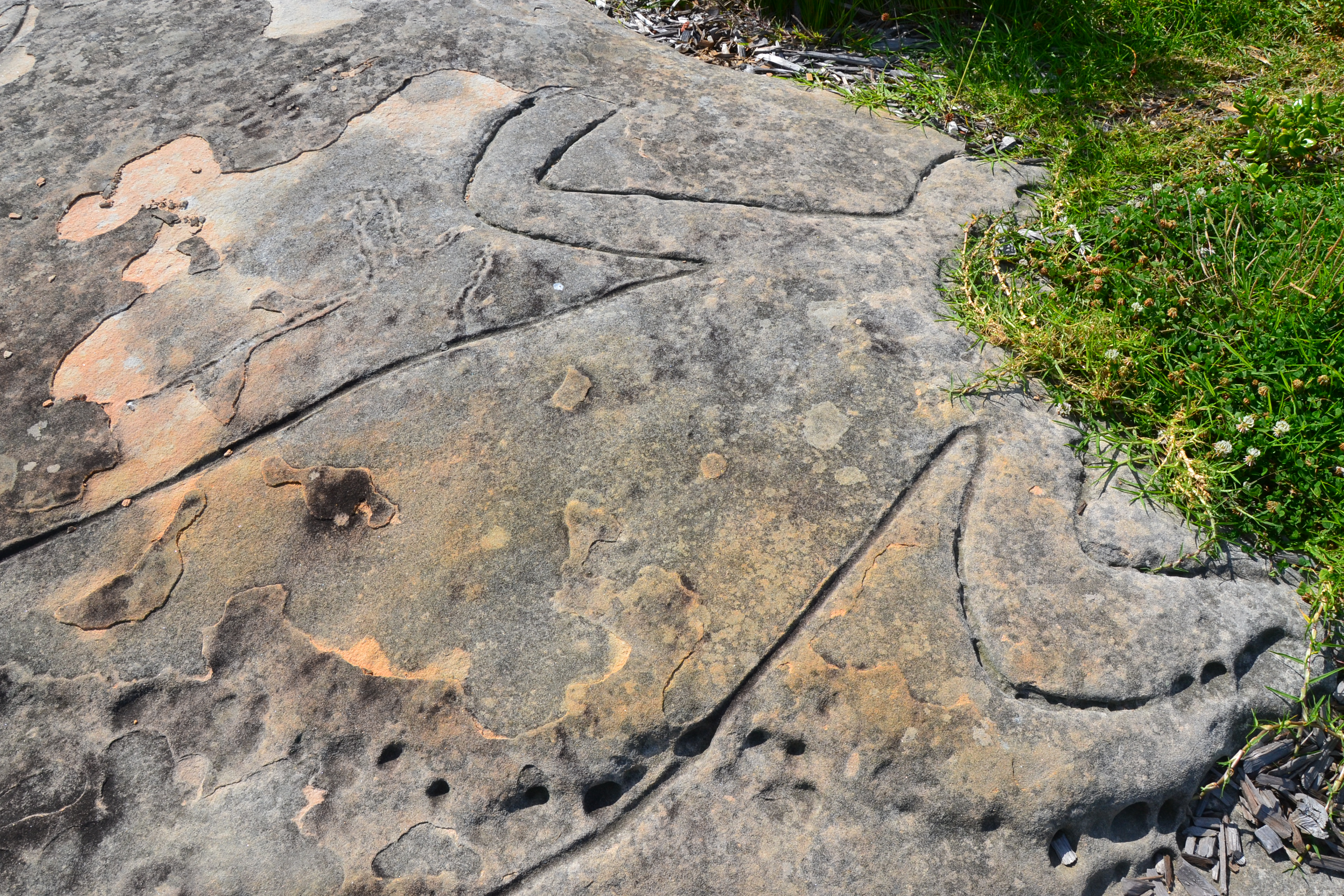
Aboriginal rock carvings near golf course

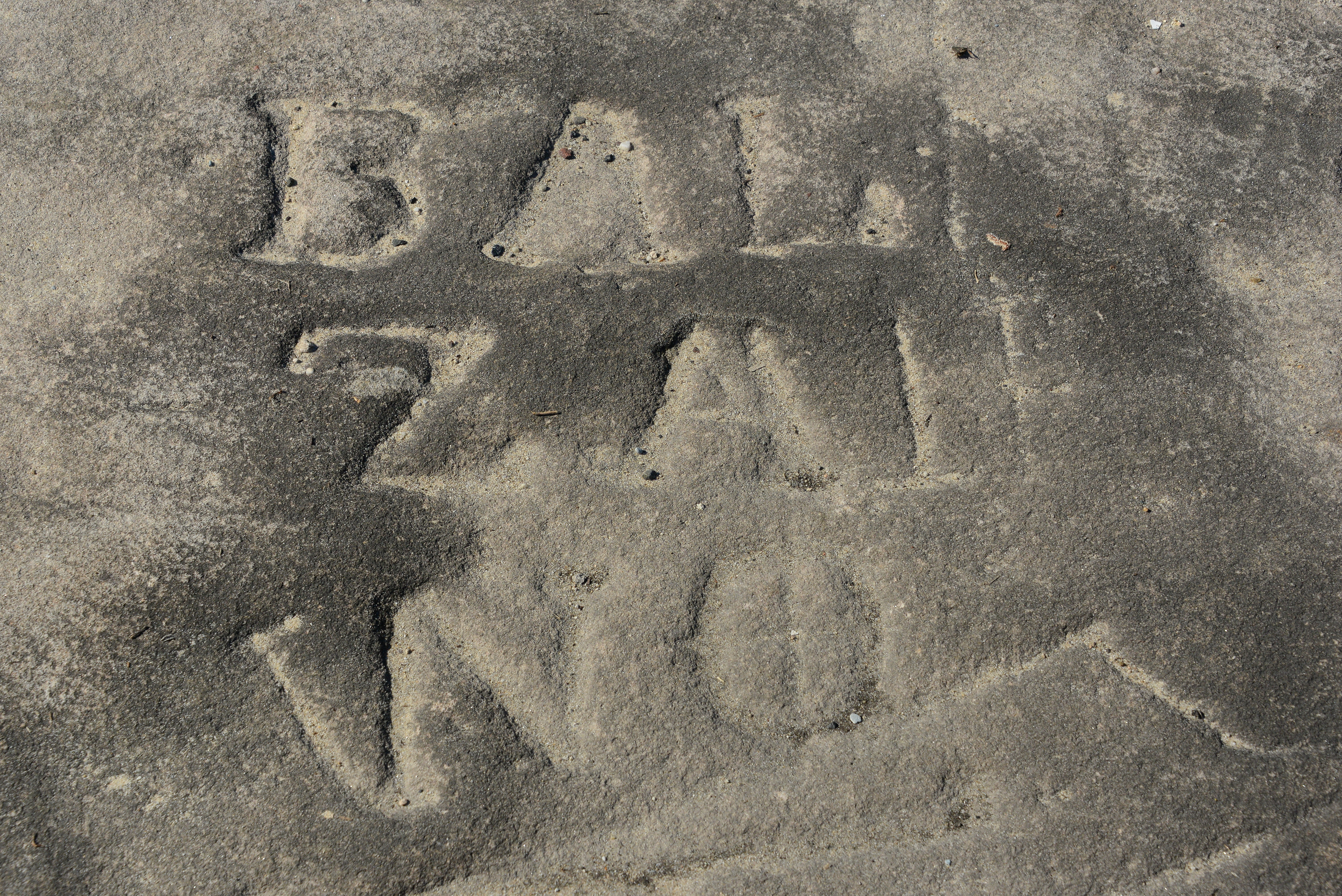
European rock carvings thought by Lawrence Hargrave to be Spanish

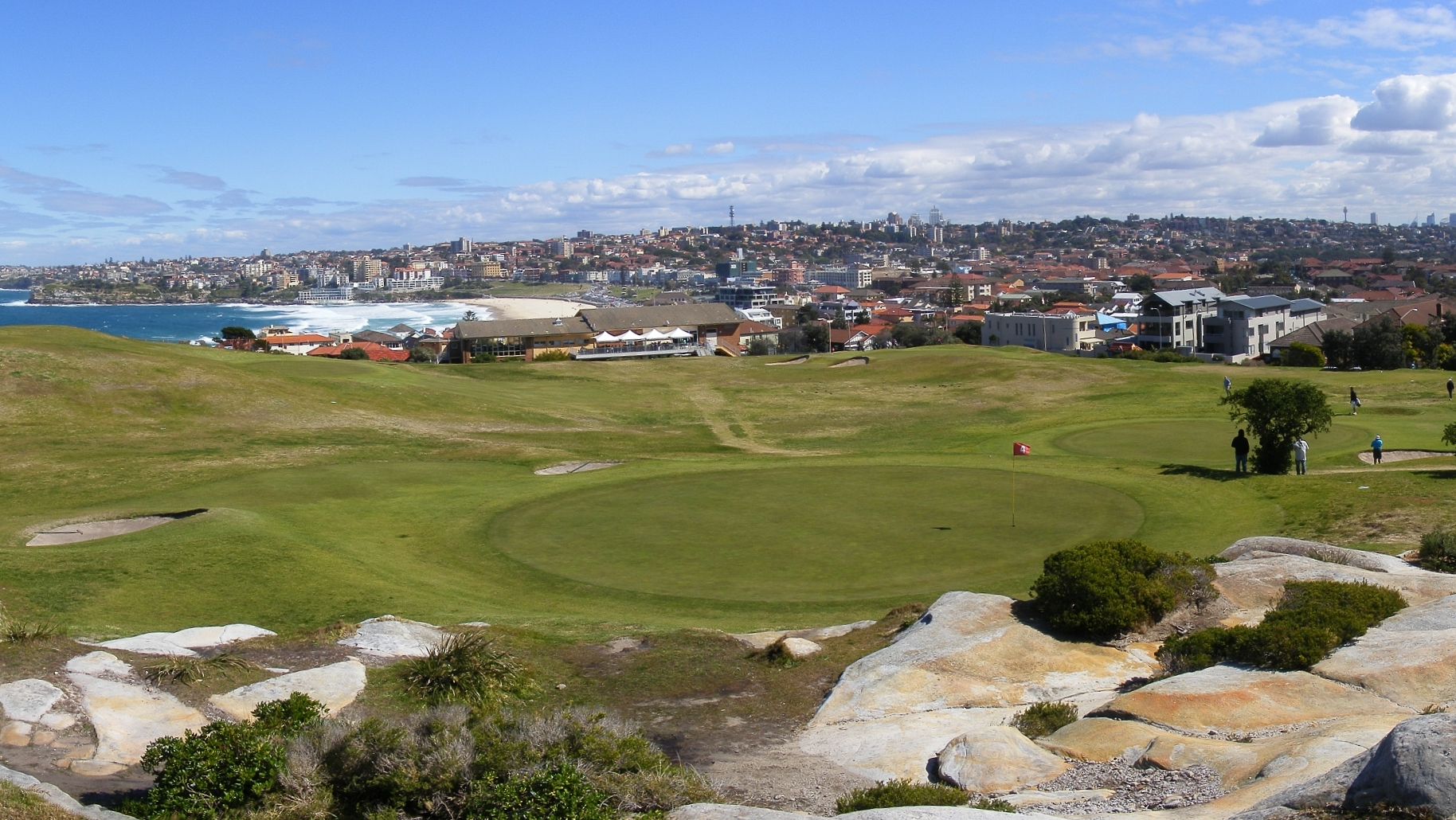
Bondi Golf Course

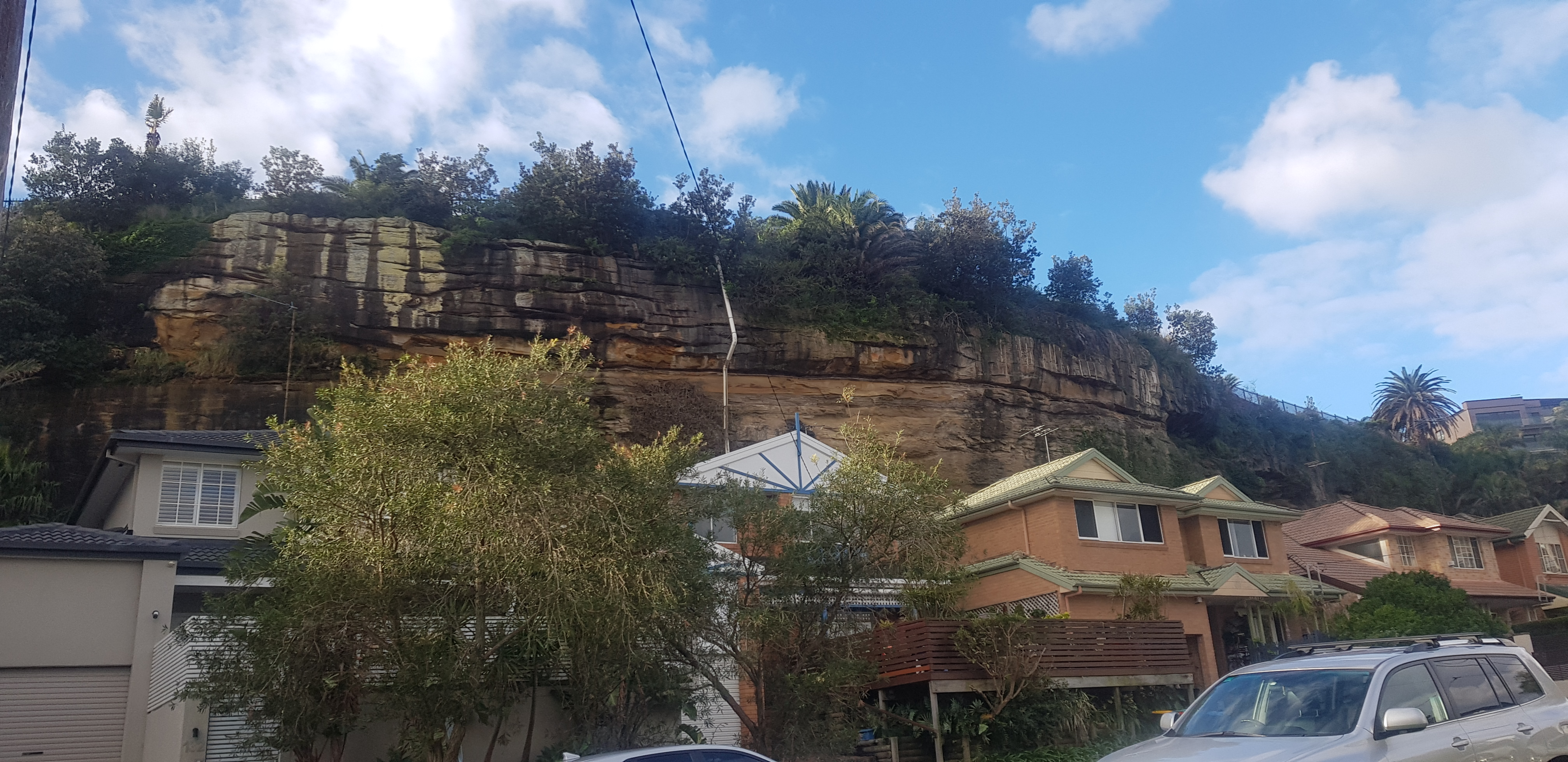
Former Basalt Quarry at North Bondi
