= Obed West =

Obed West (4 December 1807 – 24 August 1891) was an early resident of Sydney, Australia and a story-teller of its early days.

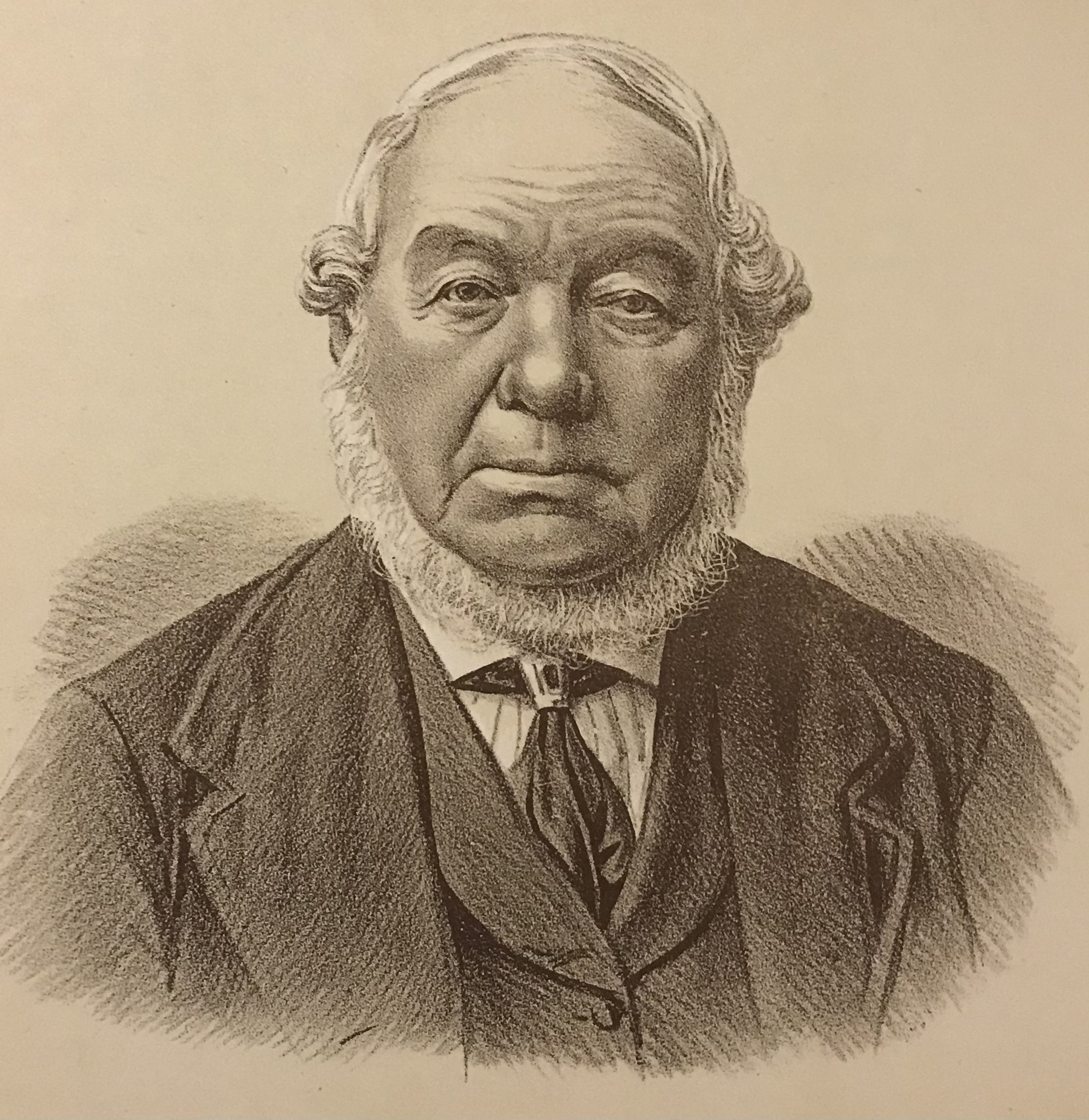
Obed West

== Life ==
Obed West was born in Pitt Street, Sydney, in a house on the eastern bank of the Tank Stream between what is now Martin Place and King Street. He was the son of convict parents, Thomas West (1773–1858) and Mary Rugg.

In 1810 West's father obtained Barcom Glen, a 75-acre (30 ha) property above Rushcutters Bay, to construct and operate a water mill for milling flour and West lived there from that date until his death in 1891. In 1836, his father conveyed the property to him on condition that he not sell, alienate or dispose of any of it, except by leases not exceeding 19 years. The land, at the edge of the inner Sydney suburb of Paddington, therefore remained largely undeveloped at least until 1910. It was said that the property remained, at West's death, "an oasis of verdant green and spreading forest trees in a wilderness of terraced houses". The family home at Barcom Glen was demolished in 1912.

In 1831, West married Jane Lindsey (1811–187) at St James’ Church, Sydney.

West was a businessman and milled flour with his father's watermill – the first of its type for grinding flour in Sydney. He also bred cattle in the Camden district, and carried on a dairy business and grew fruit at Barcom Glen.

It was said that he was an accomplished shooter and that "for years he was considered the best marksman in the colony". In 1851, he received the first gold medal for a rifle shot in New South Wales – the medal, of "Bathurst gold" was for second place at a quarterly meeting of the Sydney Rifle Club.

== Reminiscences of early Sydney ==
West rose to prominence as a source of reminiscences of the early days of Sydney, in 1882, initially in response to a series of articles in the Sydney Morning Herald under the title "Old and New Sydney". His contributions to the historiography of Sydney started with letters to the Editor of the Herald, the first two of which were over pen names: "A resident of the locality since 1810", and "Patria". The third letter, which acknowledged authorship of the earlier two, bore his own name, as did the next one.

The Herald then published further contributions from West as part of the "Old and New Sydney" series with articles on George Street, Pitt Street, Sydney's harbour and ocean bays, Chapel Row and the old Sydney Racecourse, and Redfern and surrounding suburbs.

The articles in the "Old and New Sydney" series, together with West's letters, were so popular that, in 1882–1883, they were collected and reprinted by the drapery firm of Edward Hordern and Sons for distribution to its customers.

West quickly became an authority on early Sydney, as interest in the city's history increased in the lead up to the centenary of the settlement in 1888. Articles and letters subsequent to the "Old and New Sydney" series were on a variety of topics, including: the islands of Port Jackson; the Illawarra district; the Camden district; Cowpastures; Jack Kable the pugilist; the old Sydney butter market and Central Police Office; and wells and water pumps of early Sydney. One of his last contributions was by way of an interview in the Daily Telegraph in 1888. His writings and recollections were also relied on by The Aldine Centennial History of New South Wales.

A descendant edited and published a collection of West's writing in 1988.

West relied on oral traditions, so his recollections, while sometimes accurately recording popular misconceptions of the time, could be subject to correction, as was the case with his recollections on the origins of Govett's Leap.

Of particular interest are the writings that arise from West's contact with the local Aboriginal people, one of whom, Cruwee, apparently witnessed one of the early arrivals of the British in Botany Bay, saying the vessels were thought to be "floating islands". West, possibly influenced by the Aboriginal perspective, referred to Cruwee's description of "the monsters which had invaded their shores".

== Death and legacy ==
West died at Barcom Glen and was buried at St Jude's Cemetery, Randwick. He was survived by 13 of his 14 children. It was said that, at his death, he had 113 living descendants. One son, Thomas John West, was an Alderman of Paddington Council in 1893–1906, Mayor of Paddington in 1897–1899 and an Alderman of the Sydney Council, 1900–1906.

One obituary stated that West "saw the history of New South Wales through all its subsequent eventful periods until the present time. The early history of the Colony, indeed, was a subject in which he took considerable interest. He was not only intimately acquainted with its more prominent events, but a good memory furnished him with recollections of subjects which most men in these days of rapid development and continual changes invariably forget. The appearance of the city in its very early times, the laying out of the streets, the situation of the principal buildings, the rise and progress of its suburbs were almost as familiar to him as the names of his own immediate relatives. He was full of reminiscences of the past, and he seems to have clung to old memories with all the mental tenacity which a conservative disposition has for what, by sometimes a strange perversion of veracity, is called the good old times."
