= Bondi Sewer Vent =

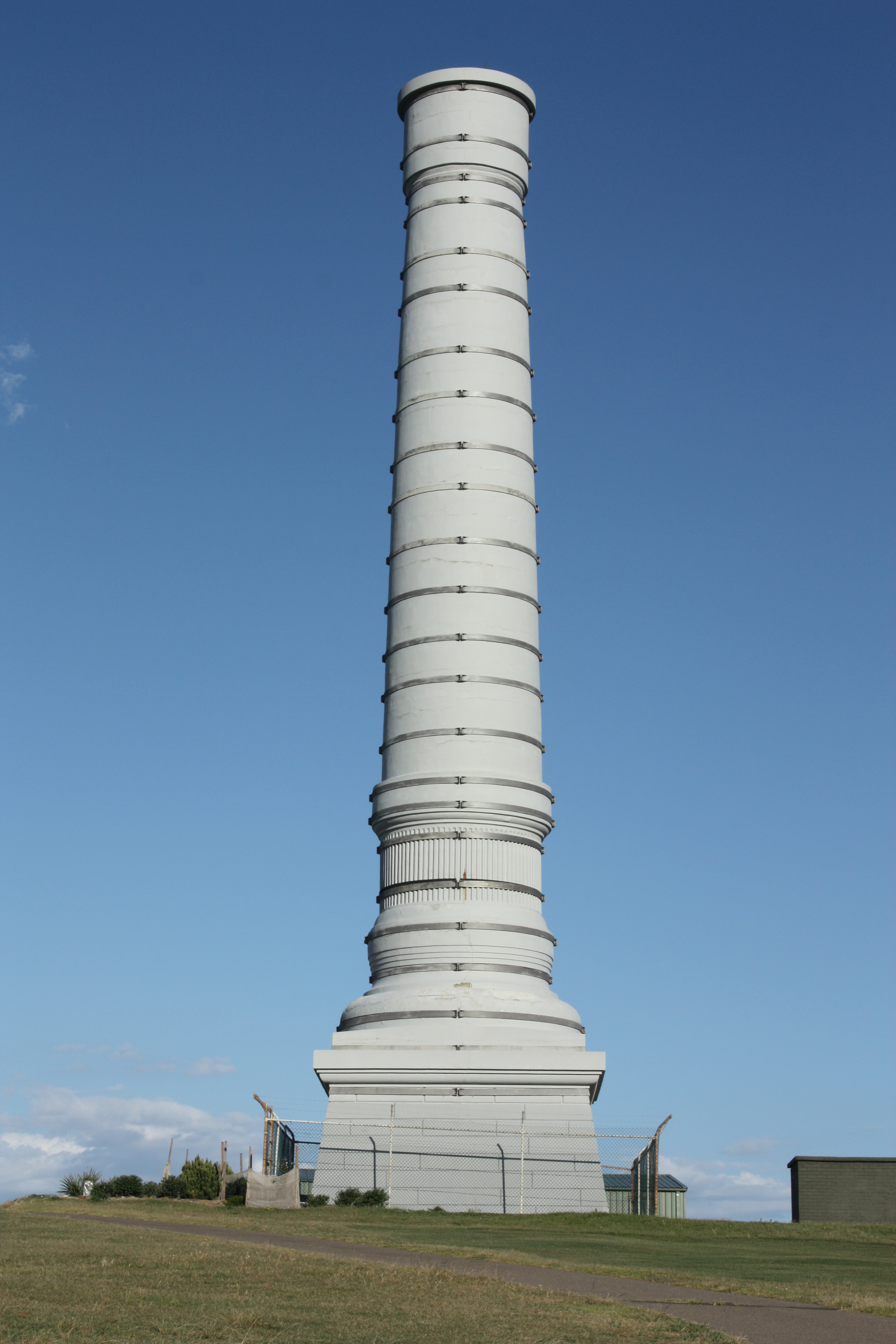
- Bondi Sewer Vent, pictured in 2010.

- Location within east Sydney Location within Australia
- 33°53′09″S 151°17′04″E
- Location: Military Road, North Bondi, Sydney, Australia

Site notes
- Architect: Metropolitan Board of Water Supply and Sewerage
- Owner: Sydney Water

New South Wales Heritage Register
- Official name: Sewer Vent (Ben Buckler); Ben Buckler; Earlier brick vent
- Type: State heritage (built)
- Designated: 15 November 2002
- Reference no.: 1637
- Type: Other – Utilities – Sewerage
- Category: Utilities – Sewerage

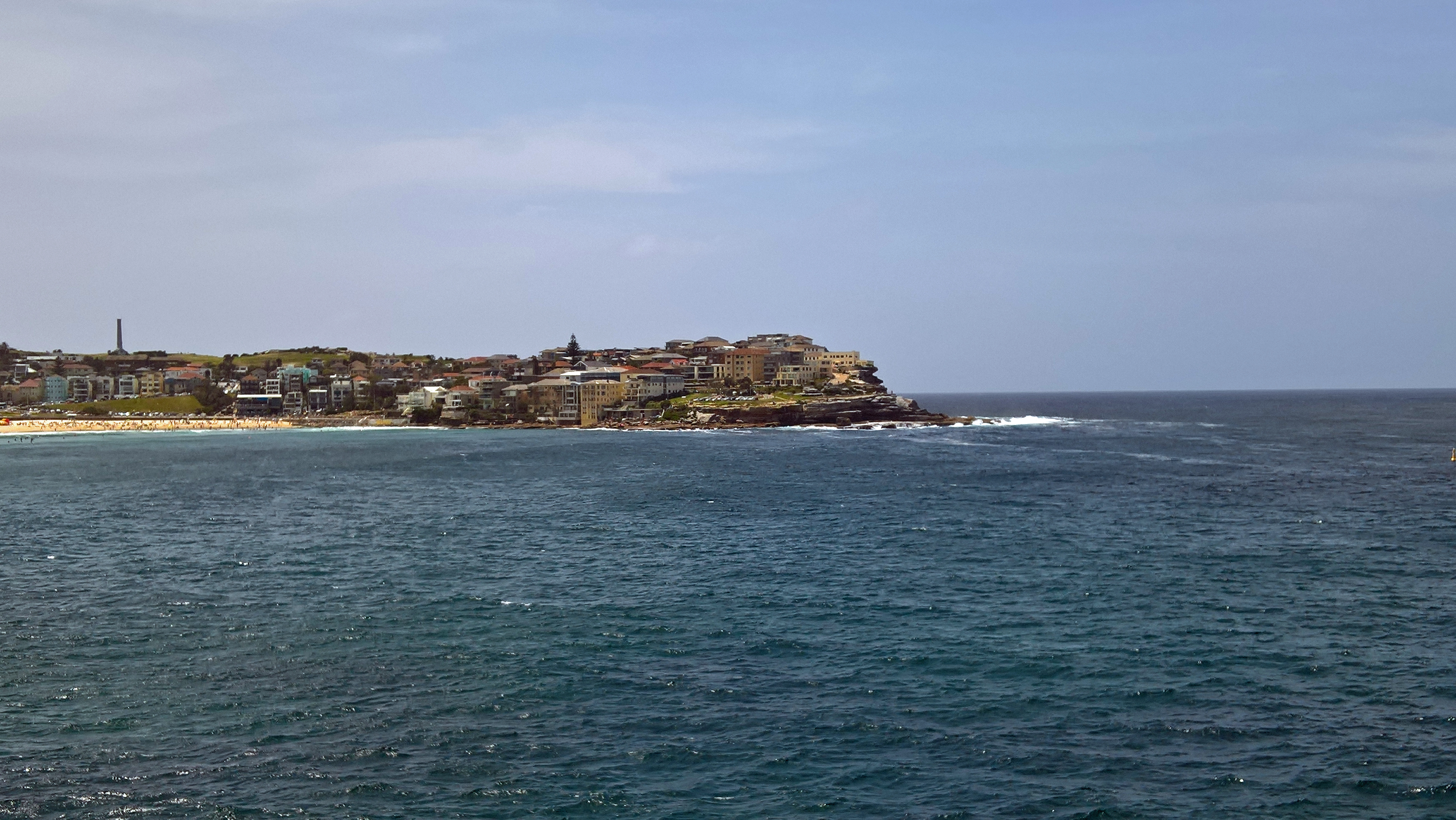
The Bondi sewer vent can be seen rising behind the beach area.

The Bondi Sewer Vent is a heritage-listed sewer vent shaft located at Military Road, North Bondi, Sydney, Australia. It was designed by the Metropolitan Board of Water Supply and Sewerage. It is also known as Sewer Vent (Ben Buckler), Ben Buckler and Earlier brick vent. The property is owned by Sydney Water.

== History ==
Consistent with the Metropolitan Board of Water Supply and Sewerage (MBWS&S) aim to provide ventilation to the sewers to prevent the air inside from becoming "dense", a brick ventilation shaft was constructed at Bondi (Ben Buckler) in 1888 over the outfall sewer. The dimensions of that vent shaft were 3.7 by 1.5 metres (12 by 5 ft) and 16.92 metres (55 ft 6 in) in height. Similar brick shafts were also built at Bellevue Hill (1889) 27 metres (90 ft) in height and York Street, Glebe (1895), 28 metres (92 ft) in height. The first brick vent shaft soon developed a series of cracks and flaws.

In response to the deterioration of the brick shaft, the Engineer-in-Chief, John Smail submitted to the Board a design for a new Ventilation Shaft and outlet. Tenders were called for the contract, with an estimated cost of A£2,000. As the lowest tender received was 17% above the budgeted estimate, the board accepted his recommendation for the shaft to be erected by selected day labour under the supervision of Board's staff.

In 1910, the brick shaft was demolished and replaced with the reinforced concrete vent shaft that is still present today. This reinforced concrete shaft was described as being:

"built of ferro concrete and the top is 100ft. above the ground. Its maximum internal diameter is 12 ft. and minimum internal diameter at the top, 7 ft. 2 in. The shaft extends on a 23 ft. Pedestal standing 20 ft. high. The thickness of the concrete where the shaft springs from the pedestal is 16 1/2 in., and at the top it is 7 in. thick. The reinforcement is of plain round steel vertical bars varying diameter from 3/4 in. diameter to 5/16, there being 46 bars in the circle and hooped with 5/16 in. round bars, spaced 6 in. and 9 in. apart. The shaft is surmounted by a cast iron cap."

— Metropolitan Board of Water Supply and Sewerage, 1913.

The Ben Buckler Vent Stack has a long history of maintenance works due to the corrosion of the reinforced concrete from hydrogen sulphide (H_{2}S) gas and cracking and spalling concrete. This includes:

- 1938 – Removal of reinforced concrete and reinforcement on the inside of the shaft to a depth of 8.9 centimetres (3.5 in) due to corrosion from H_{2}S gas attack and its replacement with clinker bricks
- 1948 – Works to repair the deterioration of brick joints by H_{2}S gas with an experimental patch of joints repaired with ordinary mortar and painted with six coats of silicate of soda
- 1956 – Repointing of affected areas up to a height of 3.0 metres (10 ft)
- 1963–65 – Addition of steel reinforcing bands around the outside of the stack and repointing of the brick joints in the shaft with cement mortar
- 1977–78 – Replacement/repair of the external steel work including lightning protection, ladders and steel bands. Repair of cracks and the addition of new lining. These repairs were expected to maintain the Vent Stack for about another ten years
- 2000–01 – Patch repairs to the external surface to make good spalled and drummy areas. Repair of cracks and the application of a crack accommodating elastomeric protective coating. Installation of new steel compression bands to provide stability against vertical cracks

== Description ==
The vent shaft is presently sited as a prominent element surrounded by open landscape adjacent the escarpment and as part of what is now Bondi Golf Course. It is prominent as a vista along New South Head Road at the corner of Penkevil Street. It is the dominant element at the end of the Vista from Curlewis Street and Old South Head Road.

The shaft comprises a classically designed pedestal, base, shaft and part capital of reinforced concrete. The pedestal is rusticated and splayed up to a base which is part fluted where it meets the shaft and smooth rendered up to the remaining section of capital.

Numerous repair works including substantial steel bands have been fitted to all parts of the shaft and in more recent times decorative lights, lightning conductors and numerous appendages have been fitted. Immediately to the south of the base is a series of concrete access lids to the chamber below with three steel vents and cowls probably dating from the mid to late 20th century. A painted brick access structure is located to the south east of the shaft, which has a flat concrete lid and would date from the mid to late 20th century. A chain wire mesh fence surrounds the base of the vent shaft which dates from the late 20th century.

The inscription on the southern face of the pedestal reads "Metropolitan Board of Water Supply and Sewerage erected 1910".

In terms of integrity the vent shaft and pedestal would be reasonably intact although it has a number of later appendages and missing its original capital. Internally the shaft has been relined and repaired more than once due to spalling of concrete and corrosion of reinforcement bars. It appears the capital has been rendered smooth.

Immediate physical curtilage would be around the base in the area of the existing fence extending to include the concrete access hatches, vents and access bulk head, but acknowledging the vents and bulk head are not in themselves significant. The visual curtilage extends from the western topographical ridge top to the ocean on the north and south of the vent shaft.

Reasonably intact.

=== Modifications and dates ===
1938, 1948, 1956, 1963, 1977, 2001.

== Heritage listing ==
As at 4 February 2002, this classically designed vent shaft, albeit not the first on the site, is aesthetically the most significant reinforced concrete structure of its type in the Sydney Water system. It is an important landmark for a great distance and likely to be held in high regard by the community. It is likely to be unique in NSW for its use, design and construction.

The Bondi Sewer Vent was listed on the New South Wales State Heritage Register on 15 November 2002 having satisfied the following criteria.

The place is important in demonstrating the course, or pattern, of cultural or natural history in New South Wales.

It is one of the few major visible parts of the 19th century engineering work, the BOOS, being the first major sewerage system in Sydney.

It is the first Vent Stack constructed in reinforced concrete by the Metropolitan Board of Water Supply & Sewerage.

The place is important in demonstrating aesthetic characteristics and/or a high degree of creative or technical achievement in New South Wales.

The Vent Stack is a prominent landmark feature of the coastline near Bondi. Its placement in an open setting is important to the maintenance of these landmark qualities. The architectural design reflects the quality and taste of the day with an understanding of classical proportions and principles.

The place has a strong or special association with a particular community or cultural group in New South Wales for social, cultural or spiritual reasons.

The Vent Stack is also likely to have social significance in its landmark qualities to the local community, and for the function it serves.

The place has potential to yield information that will contribute to an understanding of the cultural or natural history of New South Wales.

The vent stack demonstrates the early advances in the use of reinforced concrete, particularly in regard to sewer and structural engineering.

The place possesses uncommon, rare or endangered aspects of the cultural or natural history of New South Wales.

The shaft is unique in Sydney Water's system and likely NSW.

The place is important in demonstrating the principal characteristics of a class of cultural or natural places/environments in New South Wales.

The ventilation function is now common place and representative of sewage systems.
