= Our Place =

Our Place may refer to:

- Our Place (Australian TV series), a 2005 variety television show
- Our Place (U.S. TV series), a 1967 variety television show
- Our Place, an album by Adi Dick
- Our Place (organization) Jewish teen anti-substance abuse organization in the United States
- Our Place (film), 2017 film
- Our Place, a direct-to-consumer brand of cookware founded by Shiza Shahid

== See also ==
- Our House (disambiguation)
