= Bronte House =

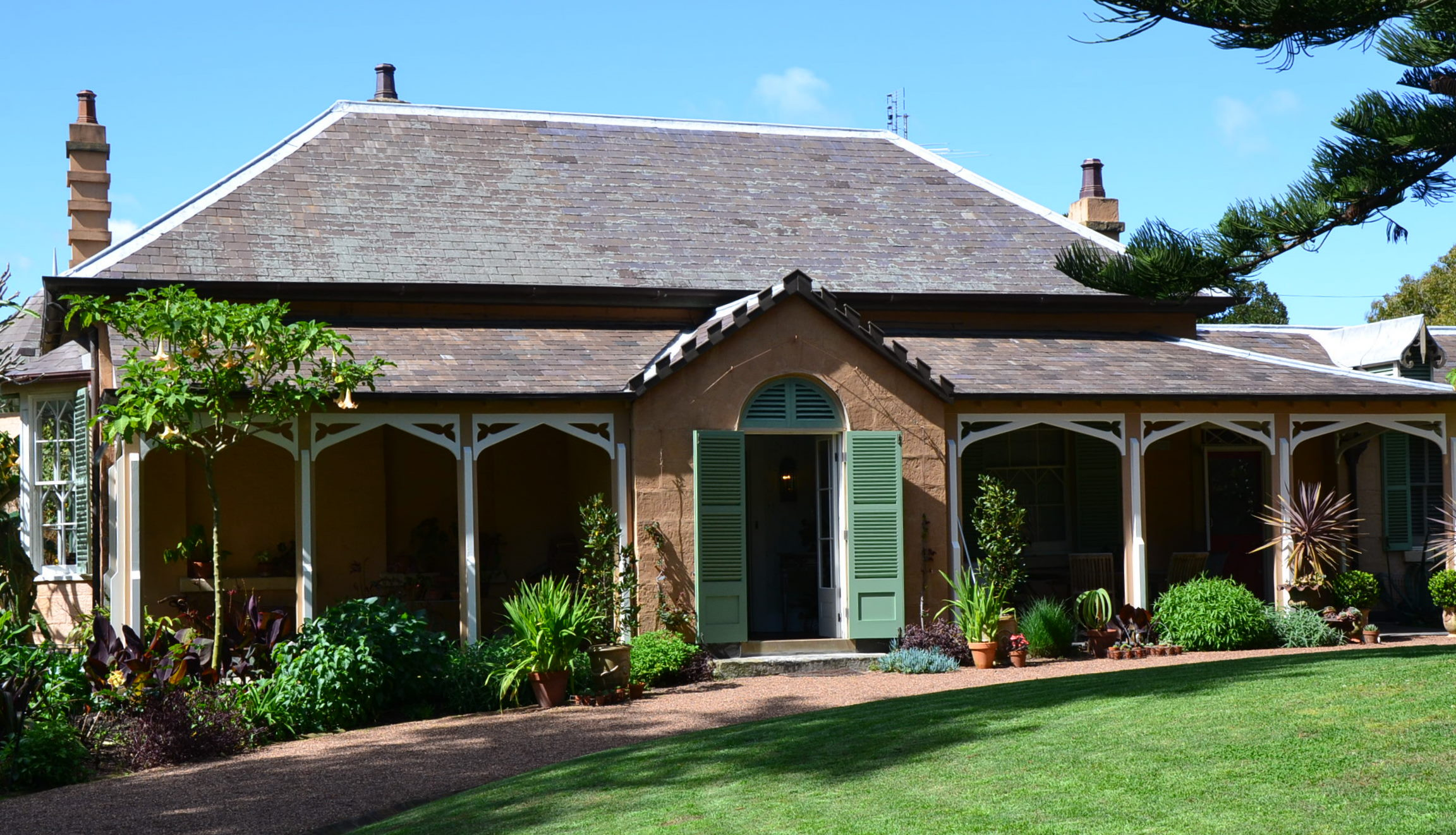

- Location within east Sydney

General information
- Status: Completed
- Type: House
- Architectural style: Australian Gothic Revival
- Location: Bronte, New South Wales, Australia
- Coordinates: 33°54′08″S 151°15′51″E
- Named for: Duke of Bronte, Horatio Nelson
- Construction started: 1838
- Completed: 1845
- Owner: Waverley Municipal Council

Technical details
- Material: Sandstone; slate; internal timber joinery; marble

Design and construction
- Architects: Mortimer Lewis (1838–43); Robert Lowe (1843–45)
- Known for: House and garden settings in the Gothic picturesque style

Renovating team
- Architect: Clive Lucas
- Other designers: Leo Schofield (house and garden); James Broadbent; Myles Baldwin (garden)

Website
- Bronte House

New South Wales Heritage Register
- Official name: Bronte House; Bronte estate
- Type: State heritage (complex / group)
- Designated: 2 April 1999
- Reference no.: 00055
- Type: Other – Landscape – Cultural
- Category: Landscape – Cultural

Bronte House is a heritage-listed historic house and visitor attraction located at 470 Bronte Road, Bronte, New South Wales, a beachside suburb of Sydney, Australia. Built in the Australian Gothic Revival style, the house was designed by Georgiana & Robert Lowe and Mortimer Lewis and was built from 1843 to 1845. It is also known as Bronte estate. The property is owned by Waverley Municipal Council and was added to the New South Wales State Heritage Register on 2 April 1999 and is listed on the (now defunct) Register of the National Estate.

Described as a "magnificent, mid-Victorian mansion," the house is a sandstone, one-storey bungalow with verandahs on the west and east sides, and features a service wing that extends to the south, plus two octagonal rooms with cone-shaped roofs.

Bronte House was designed by the Architect, Mortimer Lewis, who set it on the edge of what is now known as Bronte Gully. He obtained the first land grant of 4.9 hectares (12 acres) which extended to the shoreline of Bronte Beach, and at the time was known as Nelson Bay. Lewis decided to consolidate his holdings including the entire area which formed Bronte Park and sited the house on the estate. Construction began c. 1838, but Lewis sold the house in 1843, under financial duress, for A£420 when it was still incomplete, to Robert Lowe. Lowe completed the construction of the house in 1845. Lowe's wife, Georgina Lowe, was a watercolour artist, botanist and gardener. Her sketches and watercolours provide the earliest images of Bronte House and the surrounding area. She also sketched images of the New South Wales countryside. Her sketchbook is held at the State Library of New South Wales. Georgina Lowe took an interest in the estate and established the first Bronte House gardens. The Lowes lived in the residence for four years. Robert Lowe, an Oxford graduate and member of the English Bar, was appointed to the Legislative Council of New South Wales and was admitted to the New South Wales Bar. In 1849 the Lowe family sold Bronte House and returned to England, where Lowe was elected to the House of Commons and later appointed Chancellor of the Exchequer. In 1880 he became Viscount Sherbrooke.

The garden was neglected over the years, until well-known Sydney restaurant critic, Leo Schofield, became the tenant. Schofield has been credited with restoring the garden. The house is now owned by Waverley Municipal Council and is leased to private tenants, who are expected to maintain the house and gardens and open it to the public a few times a year. Since 2001 the garden layout has been directed by Myles Baldwin, a landscape designer.

== History ==
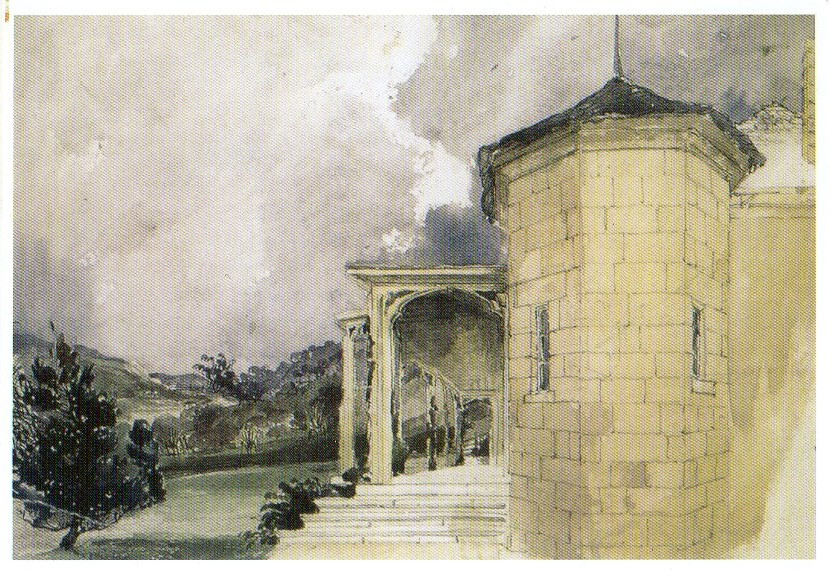
Painting of Bronte House by Georgiana Lowe

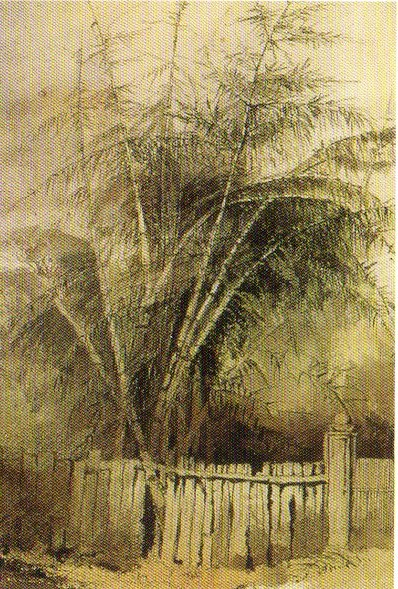
Painting of giant bamboo at Bronte House by Georgiana Lowe

=== Bronte, the suburb ===
Bronte, the suburb, takes its name from an early settler's home, Robert Lowe who named his estate "Bronte" in honour of Horatio Nelson. The name is a direct link to Royal Navy Admiral Lord Horatio Nelson. The King of Naples made Lord Nelson the Duke of Bronte in 1799. Bronte is a town in Sicily, west of Mt. Etna. According to a Sydney Mail article in October 1860, the Englishmen of Waverley paid tribute to the famed sea warrior by naming several roads after Nelson, including Nelson Bay, Nelson Road and Trafalgar Road (after the famous Battle of Trafalgar). Over time, Nelson Road became Bronte Road and Trafalgar Road became Trafalgar Street. The name Nelson Bay however survives on all official maps.

Colonial Architect Mortimer Lewis bought 4.9 hectares (12 acres), most of the beach frontage at Bronte, including the current house's site, at Nelson Bay in 1836. By 1838 he had bought 17 hectares (42 acres) in total, including the valley to the beach's west, the creek, a waterfall, part of the headland to the north and all of the headland to the south of the beach, and all of the beach. Lewis chose the house site, cut roads, fenced the land and lay the foundations of the house. He established a slab hut and a home farm on the property. In 1841 Lewis refused an offer of A£4,000 for the property. He faced financial crisis in 1842 and work on the house halted. In 1843 Lewis sold the site and unfinished house for A£420 to the barrister Robert Lowe. His design was probably altered by Robert and Georgiana Lowe. Completed in 1845, Bronte House is among the oldest buildings in the eastern suburbs of Sydney.

The name Bronte is a late 19th. century conceit and suggests a much grander residence than is really the case. Early records refer to the house simply and more appropriately as 'Mr. Lowe's Cottage at Cugee'. Even the appellation Bronte is a relatively recent one. In 1799, Ferdinand IV, King of the Two Sicilies, created Lord Nelson, Duke of Bronte.

In ancient Greek, the word "Bronte" means "Cyclops" or "Thunder" (Lady Hamilton used to refer to her lover as the 'Duke of Thunder') and in 1520, the name was officially applied to a small village on the slopes of the volcano, Mount Etna in Sicily. It was this Duchy that was awarded to Nelson, so Bronte must have seemed an apt choice of name for both the eponymous house, the beach and the suburb as they are all at what was, and indeed still is, known as Nelson Bay, a name that survives in all official maps and is much older than that of "Bronte Beach".

=== The Lowe family (1845–1849) ===
Robert Lowe (1811–1892), an Oxford graduate and a member of the English Bar, arrived in Sydney from England on the ship Aden in 1842 with his wife Georgiana. He had introductions to Governor Gipps who was a distant relative of his wife. Lowe, who had a promising career in England, had come to Australia for his health. The choice of a seaside residence was a curious one, as he was an albino. His skin and hair were both white and he wore a pair of curious- looking goggles to protect his eyes against glare. This is possibly why the bay window in the dining room at Bronte House is fitted with unique sets of adjustable upper and lower shutters to control direct light.

Mrs. Lowe was much taken with her seaside cottage where she and her husband entertained the intellectual elite of the colony. In one of her letters home she wrote "We have a little estate of 42 acres, four miles from Sydney on the sea; it is lovely beyond conception. We have given only A£420 for it." Georgiana Lowe was an accomplished artist and horsewoman but she took particular interest in the garden at Bronte House which is mentioned in several of her letters home. She established a thriving vegetable garden on land above the house and was often to be seen taking her produce to Sydney for sale. The garden had a fine lawn and the rest was laid out in terraces, each laid out into flower beds intersected with gravel walks. Plants and flowers of the most choice and rare description. It was described as "one of the finest botanical collections in the colony". Dame Mary Gilmore recalled that waratahs (Telopea speciosissima) were planted there and that her grandfather (the Lowe's bailiff) had laid out a "maze" for Georgiana Lowe. This is the first record of the successful cultivation of waratahs in a Sydney garden.

In almost all of her letters to relatives in England, Georgiana described the pleasure she had in making her garden. Writing to her mother-in-law in October 1847, she notes "I am in the garden all day and quite delight in cultivating our place. My brother John has sent me a large collection of the new annuals and vegetables. I shall have great pleasure in planting them. I have just been planting seeds that were collected on Dr. Leichhardt's (sic) expedition. A gentleman who accompanied him gave me a few seeds of each new flower and tree discovered. I intend to make drawings of our new place."

The State Library of New South Wales has Georgiana Lowe's sketchbook containing some twenty six highly accomplished watercolour drawings including many of the house and its surroundings. One of these provides clear proof that the specimen of giant bamboo (Bambusa balcooa) in front of the house dates from her time and may well have been planted by her. Equally impressive are the two magnificent pines on the northern side of the property, a Cook's pine (Araucaria columnaris) (also known as A.cookii) and Norfolk Island pine (Araucaria heterophylla) were also probably planted in the garden's earliest days. Bananas were sketched by Mrs Lowe and remain growing in the garden today. However, there is no evidence that any other of the current planting dates from Mrs. Lowe's time here, although it is tempting to speculate that the brush box (Lophostemon confertus) on the edge of the gully to the north of the house and the brown pine (Podocarpus elatus) near the Port Jackson fig (Ficus rubiginosa) may have begun life as some of those seeds gathered on Leichhardt's expedition. It is also possible that Mrs Lowe planted the Port Jackson fig tree.

In 1849, the Lowes returned to England. Robert Lowe, his health much improved, subsequently became Chancellor of the Exchequer and was later elevated to the peerage as Viscount Sherbrooke. Neither he nor his wife ever returned to Australia, although both spoke warmly of their years at Nelson Bay.

=== After the Lowe family (1849–1948) ===
The Lowes sold Bronte House to G. A. Lloyd, an auctioneer, merchant and Colonial Treasurer for A£1,300. Lloyd owned the house for only a few months before it was sold for A£2,000 to one J. Lublin, then sold again to the superintendent of the Bank of Australasia, J. J. Falconer, who in 1861 once again put the property up for auction. The buyer was J. B. Holdsworth, a hardware and ironmonger magnate, who paid A£4,750 for the house. Before he died, Holdsworth added the second storey to the wing on Bronte Road. Holdsworth's son sold the house and 31 hectares (77 acres) to Stanley Ebsworth in 1882 and a period of rapid change of ownership ended. A subdivision created a through road (Bronte Road) south of the house to the beach on part of the former carriage drive. This entailed demolition of one of the corner turrets to the house and construction of the two-storey wing to the south.

Members of the Ebsworth family, many of whom were wool brokers, owned (from 1882 - AGHS-SHB, 2013) and lived in the building for over six decades until 1948. James E. Ebsworth was second commissioner of the Australian Agricultural Company, which had land grants in Port Stephens, the Hunter Valley and Peel River (around Tamworth) districts of NSW. His descendant E. M. Ebsworth, based in Bronte House, was the manager of the Mitchell Estate in the northern part of Rose Bay, where Ebsworth Road was subdivided off for sale in 1909. In 1935 the Ebsworths tried to interest the NSW Premier Sir Bertram Stevens in the NSW Government buying the house.

=== After the Ebsworth family ===
For a time after World War II it was occupied by the Bronte branch of the Australian Red Cross (two rooms and the kitchen at the house's rear) and used as offices.

In 1948 Austin Ebsworth, a bachelor, sold it to Waverley Council who seem to have acquired it as part of an exercise to consolidate the valley leading to Bronte Beach as parkland. Council owned and operated it in various uses for some years. It suffered from unsympathetic changes to the house and inadequate maintenance. Council agreed that the Red Cross could rent part of Bronte House and this continued until 1969. An evening card party was held by them each week to raise money for their rent. After 1969 the house was restored by Council.

By the late 1970s it was in poor condition. By 1980 the house, which was then in use as a venue for weddings and parties, had fallen into disrepair and had suffered a number of insensitive alterations. Its exterior form remained largely unchanged since the Holdsworth occupancy but the interior, with walls removed and bars and kitchens inserted, had been altered beyond recognition. In 1982 an outbuilding for garaging and storage was built near the entrance gates at the site's western end.

Faced with a dilemma over what to do with its property, Waverley Municipal Council embarked in 1983 on a far-sighted and ambitious plan to lease the house for a peppercorn lease ($1/year) for 25 years to a person or persons willing to undertake the cost of the extensive repairs, on condition of opening it to the public 6 times a year.

Tenders were called and on 31 January 1983, Bronte House was let to an Englishman, Christopher Selmes, who undertook to spend a minimum of A$200,000 on repairs to the house (Waverley Council had already spent some money on repairs to the roof) and duly did so. Indeed, the sum expended on restoration, carried out under the supervision of the conservation architect, Clive Lucas, was closer to $300,000. Selmes also furnished the main rooms of the house with antiques as required under conditions of lease.

The lease was transferred to Mr & Mrs Peter Muller c. 1987.

=== Bronte House 1995–2002 ===
Arts organiser Leo Schofield assumed responsibility for the lease of Bronte House in November 1994. He undertook restoration of the house and garden from 1995–2002 in keeping with its period of original construction and occupation by the Lowes. Schofield had wallpaper printed in England from original blocks of 1845, and furnished the house with mostly Gothic revival or neo-Classical pieces.

Following extensive restoration work on the house, the garden at Bronte House has undergone a complete overhaul. A plan for re-planting was drawn up in April 1983 by Australia's most respected authority on historic houses and gardens, James Broadbent. Some elements of his plan were implemented (e.g.: a replacement Norfolk Island pine (Araucaria heterophylla) was planted in the centre of the carriage loop, an evergreen /southern magnolia /bull bay (Magnolia grandiflora) at the end of the south-eastern shrubbery, a pair of laurustinus (Viburnum tinus) planted flanking the steps, old 19th century varieties of Camellia japonica were planted in the north-western border (since mostly removed), a rustic fence and creepers were re-erected on top of the bank east of the eastern lawn, and sandstone retaining walls holding the eastern terraces were repaired.

In an attempt to achieve instant privacy, Selmes had removed historically appropriate trees and replaced them with others far less suitable but faster-growing. This process has now been reversed by Schofield. Combined with poor maintenance, this ad hoc approach resulted in a garden that, when Schofield took possession in 1994 the garden was seriously neglected, wildly overgrown, and almost completely shaded so that any new growth was dramatically restricted. Weed infestation of the site was extensive and the historic rock garden on the ocean front of the property was almost completely buried under a mountain of weeds. The original late Victorian mounded rockery, complete with weathered rocks and coral gathered from the nearby shore, has only recently been uncovered and this whole area has now largely been cleared, restored and re-planted. Also uncovered was a circular fountain of 1886 which had been filled with earth and planted with ailing arum lilies. It has been restored and planted with aquatic plants. A stand of poorly grown Hill's fig (Ficus hillii) along the southern boundary to Bronte Road has recently been removed and replaced, in accordance with the original Broadbent plan, with eighteen advanced native lilly pilly (Acmena smithii).

Many of the plants used in the current scheme are being trialled to test their suitability to coastal conditions, indifference to sandy soil and resistance to salt winds. The final form of the garden will evolve over the next few years and many refinements remain to be made, but dramatic changes are unlikely to the rockery or to the northern gully where the bank has recently been planted with three and a half thousand kaffir lilies (Clivia miniata). These will be shaded by a median canopy of tree ferns (Cyathea cooperi) and seventeen recently introduced specimens of the dwarf date palm, (Phoenix roebelenii). A number of frangipani have been planted (Plumeria rubra & other spp.), banks of ornamental gingers (Hedychium spp., Alpinia spp., etc) in the shade and honeysuckles such as the giant Burmese honeysuckle (Lonicera hildebrandeana), along with a more "cottage garden" effect in borders close to the house, areas of succulents and cycads over rocky banks.

Schofield had the assistance garden designers Michael McCoy and Myles Baldwin in his work to restore and revive the garden, work taking over eight years. He re-established Georgiana Lowe's garden and extended it. The garden has been described as "a small scale botanic garden, a repository for rare and beautiful plants". Schofield also wrote a book The Garden at Bronte chronicling his time and work to revive the property.

Bronte House is owned bv Waverley Municipal Council and privately occupied under a lease agreement. It is open to the public six times a year. By January 2004 Schofield sold the four-years-remaining lease and departed. The new lessee is magazine publisher Matt Handbury. As of 2004, Gardeners Myles Baldwin and Chris Owen maintain the garden.

The Hanbury family decided not to sign a new lease when the current one expired in January 2013. Waverley Council considered a report on options for the property, including sale of the property, retention with standard or commercial leasing, Council use or a "repairing lease" as at present (the current tenants are required to spend $200,000 per year on the upkeep of the property as part of their lease).

== Description ==
=== Garden ===
The placement of the house in its landscape is particularly felicitous, the formal garden merging easily with the natural landscape of Bronte Gully to make it the embodiment of the romantic marine villa. The garden, laid out by Mrs. Robert Lowe in the 1840s occupies the head of a small valley leading down to Bronte beach and Nelson Bay. The property contains largely overgrown remnants of an important mid-nineteenth century picturesque garden. The garden, laid out by Mrs. Robert Lowe in the 1840s occupies the head of a small valley leading down to Bronte beach and Nelson Bay. It had been severely sub-divided but the most important section, including the natural rock outcrops beneath the house, survives.

The original drive now forms the upper part of Bronte Road and only part of the carriage loop (originally planted with a Norfolk Island pine (Araucaria heterophylla), since replaced) before the western front of the house survives. The eastern (beach) side of the hose gives onto a grassed terrace apparently reformed with steps, a circular concrete pond or flower bed and extended by the construction of a stone retaining wall in the late nineteenth century.

Beneath this wall to the east and north, down the steep rocky slope to the stream (now a storm water drain) is the elaborate rockery garden formed by Mrs. Lowe (see her own drawing album, Mitchell Library). Mrs Lowe's orchard and vegetable garden occupied the lower part of the valley, now a public park much altered and replanted, (recent bush regeneration works are reintroducing native rainforest and coastal forest species). The rock garden although neglected for many years is largely intact with irregularly curving paths and random steps being constructed or cut from the living rock along the slope. The mounded rockery, complete with weathered rocks and coral gathered from the nearby shore on the bank east of the house, has been uncovered and replanted with a range of choice succulents.

The overgrown plant material which has survived is possibly largely original, or at least of nineteenth century origin; Gymea lily (Doryanthes excelsa), Port Jackson figs (Ficus rubiginosa), Cook's and Norfolk Island pines (Araucaria columnaris and A.heterophylla), Bangalow palms (Archontophoenix cunninghamiana), Shell ginger (Alpinia zerumbet), spider plant (Chlorophytum comosum), bromeliads such as Billbergia, Aechmia and Neoregelia spp./cv.s etc. Two large Alcanteria sp. are in raised urns edging a path under the Moreton Bay fig. A large clump of giant bamboo (Bambusa balcooa) still growing was almost certainly planted by Georgiana Lowe, who recorded this plant in one of her watercolour paintings of the estate. This plant was almost certainly obtained from her cousin, Governor Gipps. There is an identical and equally large clump still growing in the grounds of Government House, Sydney, where the Lowes stayed for a short time after their arrival from England.

The garden had a fine lawn and the rest was laid out in terraces, each laid out into flower beds intersected with gravel walks. Plants and flowers of the most choice and rare description. It was described as "one of the finest botanical collections in the colony". Dame Mary Gilmore recalled that waratahs (Telopea speciosissima) were planted there and that her grandfather (the Lowe's bailiff) had laid out a "maze" for Georgiana Lowe. This is the first record of the successful cultivation of waratahs in a Sydney garden.

In almost all of her letters to relatives in England, Georgiana described the pleasure she had in making her garden. Writing to her mother-in-law in October 1847, she notes "I am in the garden all day and quite delight in cultivating our place. My brother John has sent me a large collection of the new annuals and vegetables. I shall have great pleasure in planting them. I have just been planting seeds that were collected on Dr. Leichardt's (sic) expedition. A gentleman who accompanied him gave me a few seeds of each new flower and tree discovered. I intend to make drawings of our new place." The State Library of New South Wales has Georgiana Lowe's sketchbook containing some twenty six highly accomplished watercolour drawings including many of the house and its surroundings. One of these provides clear proof that the specimen of giant bamboo (Bambusa balcooa), in front of the house dates from her time and may well have been planted by her. Equally impressive are the two magnificent pines on the northern side of the property, a Cook's pine (Araucaria columnaris) (syn. A.cookii) and Norfolk Island pine, (Araucaria heterophylla), were also probably planted in the garden's earliest days. Bananas (Musa sp.) were sketched by Mrs Lowe and remain growing in the garden today.

However, there is no evidence that any other of the current planting dates from Mrs. Lowe's time here, although it is tempting to speculate that the brush box (Lophostemon confertus) on the edge of the gully to the north of the house and the brown pine (Podocarpus elatus) near the Port Jackson fig (Ficus rubiginosa) may have begun life as some of those seeds gathered on Leichhardt's expedition. It is also possible that Mrs Lowe planted the Port Jackson fig. A large Moreton Bay fig (F.macrophylla) with wide spreading branches also straddles the northern edge of the same rock terrace on which the house sits.

=== Bronte House ===
Designed very much in the "picturesque" style, its features include romantic circular and hexagonal corner turrets, deep bay windows and fanciful pierced wooden tracery on both the eastern and western fronts. The plan of a four square house with bay and bow windows is typical of Lewis. In its use of Gothic details, asymmetrical forms, rusticated elements and castellation, as on the bargeboard above the front entrance, Bronte House departs from the simplicity and symmetry of earlier Georgian building types and hints at the rampant revivalism of the Victorian era.

Although lacking the architectural distinction and scale of places like, Elizabeth Bay House, Tusculum, Rockwall, Carrara or the other great surviving mansions built around Sydney Harbour, Bronte House is significant as a largely intact example of a cottage ornee in the "Gothick taste", a decorative style much favored in the last quarter of the 18th and the first half of the 19th centuries. Ornamental "cottages" of this type occur throughout England, Europe and the United States, even in Russia where the English architect Adam Menelaus created one on the Gulf of Finland for Tsar Nicholas Ill.

Joan Kerr and James Broadbent in their book on Gothick Taste in the Colony of NSW described the house as:

"One of the larger of the cottage ornees of the 1840s is the extant Bronte House at Bronte (c. 1843), an amusing "Gothic-Italianate" design, described in its sale advertisement in 1849 as "in the Swiss style". It is a turreted single storey building picturesquely sited at the head of a small valley leading down to Nelson's Bay. The Gothick detailing of its wide bay windows and timber traceried verandahs is particularly pleasing'.

— Joan Kerr and James Broadbent

Kerr and Broadbent suggest that, while the Lowes almost certainly followed Lewis's general plan for the house, 'the elevation details probably owed much to Mrs. Lowe's markedly Picturesque Taste.'

In his more recent authoritative work The Australian Colonial House, Dr. Broadbent astutely suggests that the design of Bronte House may have been inspired by J. J. Ricauti's Rustic Architecture published in 1840, a copy of which Sir Thomas Mitchell loaned to Lewis in 1841. Rectangular form main house (Georgian cottage ornee) with high double roof, originally shingled (now slates). Verandahs to east and west. Single storey servants' wing to south, double storey addition (c. 1880) to south of it facing Bronte Road. Encaustic tile floors on verandahs.

Sydney's Bronte House was built in 1845 during the Victorian period. The house is an open decorative forn of a then-popular Gothic revival, clearly depicted in details like the pointed, arched timber seen around the windowpanes.

== Modifications and dates ==
- 1832 – 4.9 hectares (12 acres), Lewis
- 1836 – 17 hectares (42 acres), Lewis
- 1861 – 21 hectares (52 acres) sold
- 1861-1882 – Holdsworth adds a second storey addition to the south of the house.
- 1882 – 31 hectares (77 acres) sold to Ebsworth. Subdivision to create through road (Bronte Road) to south to beach, one of corner turrets of house demolished.
- Later 19th century – western verandahs enclosed, the north western verandah with several courses of sandstone blocks to make a kind of conservatory, which was later glassed over. The southwestern verandah was enclosed with lattice. The property had weeping willows (Salix babylonica), hothouses, an orchard, vinery, fernery and a gardener's cottage. Smoking and billiard rooms gone.
- Post 1945 – occupied by Red Cross and used as offices until 1969.
- 1948 – acquired by Waverley Council as part of valley consolidation for public parkland
- 1980–84 – Clive Lucas, Stapleton & Partners did restoration work for Council and tenant Christopher Selmes. The main works were: new internal walls between bedroom 1, the drawing room and central passage; new baths 2 & 3; provision of four modern bathroom fitouts and one modern kitchen fitout; removal of division walls from kitchen area, and secondary bedroom areas; closure of several doors in western passage; closure of side openings to front hall or porch; creation of a new rear porch; reconstruction of shutters; reconstruction of south-west verandah; east elevation to wing - external stonework restored with some second hand stone introduced as necessary. The garden property was originally 17 hectares (42 acres) and has been severely sub-divided and reduced down to c.one hectare (two point five acres) but the most important section, including the natural rock outcrops beneath the house, survives.
- 1982 – single storey double garage built on western tip of property by entry, in form of early carriage house (Lucas). Curtilage fenced (wire mesh/pipe to north/park, timber picket to south/Bronte Road), unfortunately excluding some former Lowe era garden remnants outside fence (Georgiana Lowe's "woodland boudoir", a circular planting area and considerable dry stone walled areas).
- 1983 – leased to Selmes, re-roofed, restoration work begins. James Broadbent garden plan partly implemented, eg: 19th century varieties of Camellia japonica planted on northwestern border approaching house by carriage drive, carriage drive reconstructed and Norfolk Island pine planted in centre of loop, replacing a cement fountain added in the c. 1980s, and re-creating a 19th century NI pine planting here, sprinklers installed, Magnolia grandiflora added to southeastern border, two frangipanis planted near (north of) house.
- 1992 – Lucas & Tanner reports on necessary repairs.
- 1994–2000 – extensive restoration, conservation and adaptation works to house and garden. New sandstone dry stone retaining wall north of the northern border on top of the bank is added. Camphor laurels removed (a few kept). Most of Broadbent era camellias removed in NW border. one frangipani north of house removed, one kept. New gravel path and steps cut in bank northeast of house (west of Port Jackson fig tree) to lower parts of garden. Two wire pointed arches erected over path, framing view east to ocean. Steps sandstone/sleepers added to north. Three Magnolia grandiflora "Exmouth" pruned into cones on western borders. New plantings of Queensland kauri (Agathis robusta) east of garden, Norfolk Island pine, bunya pine (Araucaria bidwillii), Queensland lacebark (Brachychiton discolor) added. Predominantly white and yellow coloured flower borders added north of house, Indian shot/canna (C.indica cv.s) walk to the southeast added near fountain. A new succulent garden laid out on eastern slope below lawn and original late Victorian mounded rockery, which has itself been uncovered, cleared and planted. 1886 circular fountain restored.
- 1998 – three bin compost bins added in south eastern corner. Period appropriate roses (most admired by Georgiana Lowe in Alexander Macleay's garden at Elizabeth Bay House) added to borders - 'Souvenir de Malmaison (introduced c. 1843), 'Gloire de Dijon (1853), 'Reine des Violettes (1860) since replaced with "Crepuscule" (1904), Lady Hillingdon (1917), and several Graham Thomas hybrids "Abraham Darby" and "Graham Thomas", both yellow flowered; two citrus trees added to lawn southwest of house.
- 2004 – work continuing to extend succulent garden past the 150-year-old giant bamboo (Bambusa balcooa) clump to the north-east. Frangipani garden in south-east is being reworked to display the most prized specimens, to be complemented by the underplanting of a produce garden.

=== Modifications/re-creation from 1980s to 1994 ===
Following extensive restoration work on the house, the garden at Bronte House has undergone a complete overhaul. A plan for re-planting was drawn up in April 1983 by Australia's most respected authority on historic houses and gardens, James Broadbent. Some elements of his plan were implemented (eg: a replacement Norfolk Island pine was planted in the centre of the carriage loop, two evergreen /southern magnolias/ bull bays (Magnolia grandiflora cv.) at the end of the southern shrubbery, a pair of laurustinus (Viburnum tinus) planted flanking the steps, old 19th century varieties of Camellia japonica cv.s were planted in the northern border west of the house (since mostly removed), a rustic fence and creepers were re-erected on top of the bank east of the eastern lawn, and sandstone retaining walls holding the eastern terraces were repaired. But in an attempt to achieve instant privacy, Selmes had removed historically appropriate trees and replaced them with others far less suitable but faster growing. This process has now been reversed. Combined with poor maintenance, this ad hoc approach resulted in a garden that, when Schofield took possession (1994) was seriously neglected, wildly overgrown and almost completely shaded so that any new growth was dramatically restricted. Weed infestation of the site was extensive and the historic rock garden on the ocean front of the property was almost completely buried under a mountain of weeds.

The original late Victorian mounded rockery, complete with weathered rocks and coral gathered from the nearby shore, has only recently been uncovered and this whole area has now largely been cleared, restored and re-planted. Plantings today feature Mauritius hemp (Furcraea selloa & variegated form 'Variegata'), variegated century plant (Agave americana 'Variegata'), Canary Island dragon tree (Dracaena draco), Agave parvifolia & A.p.'Variegata', silver candles (Kleinia serpens), Madagascan Kalanchoe beharensis which is forming a small tree, Cereus peruvianus sp. (candelabra cactus), Yucca sp., mother-in-law's tongue (Sansevieria sp. 'Variegata'), a spotted form of Aloe sp., Gasteria maculata, Puya sp., Aeonium cv.s ('Schwartzkopf') and red New Zealand flax (Phormium cookianum "Rubrum"(?)).

Also uncovered was a circular fountain of 1886 which had been filled with earth and planted with ailing arum lilies (Zantedeschia aethiopica). It has been restored and planted with aquatic plants. Bird-of-paradise flower (Strelitzia reginae) also grows nearby. An area of compost heaps forms the property's south-eastern corner, facing paling fences to Bronte Road. A stand of poorly grown Hill's fig (Ficus microcarpa 'Hillii') along the southern boundary to Bronte Road has recently been removed and replaced, in accordance with the original Broadbent plan, with eighteen advanced native lily pilly (Acmena smithii). Many of the plants used in the current scheme are being trialled to test their suitability to coastal conditions, indifference to sandy soil and resistance to salt winds. The final form of the garden will evolve over the next few years and many refinements remain to be made. Urns on pedestals feature in parts of the garden/ending walks - e.g. Agave attenuata (in a raised urn), A.victoriae-reginae in two urns at the eastern end of a flight of steps/path from the salon to the eastern lawn and giant bromeliad Alcanteria sp./cv. in two urns flanking a path near the Moreton Bay fig.

The eastern terrace has been edged by Nile lily (Agapanthus orientalis cv.) and Mexican daisy (Tithonia rotundifolia), Hippeastrum paplio with its green/cream/purple-striped flowers, next to a reconstructed rustic fence on top of the terrace/s retaining wall and bank to the east. This is covered with a white Wistera sp. "Alba" and ladder ferns (Blechnum sp.) below. A border of cannas, castor oil plant (Ricinus communis), Lantana montevidensis, Aztec lilies (Alstroemeria cvs.), Rosa rugosa cv.s, nasturtiums (Tropaeolum majus), Gymea lilies (Doryanthes excelsa), ornamental grasses and other plants surrounds a metal semi-circular Victorian bench at the southern end of the eastern lawn, screening the fountain further east. Under the huge Moreton Bay fig to the house's north-east, a low wire mesh/pipe fence over the cliff face has been covered with Buddleja madagascarensis. The fig is also planted with epiphytic rock lilies (Dendrobium speciosum) and under planted with birds nest fern (Asplenium nidus), cast iron plant (Aspidistra elatior) and bromeliads. Walks are edged with Cymbidium orchid cv.s, Puya sp. and other shade loving plants such as Ctenanthe lubbersiana cv.s. A yesterday, today and tomorrow bush (Brunfelsia americana) with its deep blue flowers also grows in this border.

The cast iron fountain has been restored and planted with Japanese iris (I.ensata cv.s), arum lilies and water lilies. A herringbone brick path around it has been remade into gravel path with brick bed edgings. A collection of frangipanis (Plumeria rubra cv.s) has been planted in a tear-drop shaped area east of the fountain, leading to the compost bins and service area. Eight topiary "balls" of box (Buxus sempervirens) have been added at triangular bed corners edging the western entry garden's carriage loop. Another pair of box "balls" has been added by the steps up to the house's western entry door. Four wire work Victorian pointed arches have been added to principle paths, two framing views east to the ocean. One of these supports Rangoon creeper (Quisqualis indica). A frangipani on the house's north-western corner supports a climbing dragon fruit (Hylocereus undatus), and at its base a small path and steps are edged with two giant clam shells. A large shrub of Hibiscus tiliaceus with its lemon yellow flowers is near the north-eastern corner of the house and the "yellow" border path.

A new path has been cut in the northern bank west of the Port Jackson fig, allowing easier access to the lower path and around the bottom (north) of the garden. The sandstone steps are recycled blocks from the formerly enclosed northwestern verandah of the house, recycled. Dramatic changes are unlikely to the rockery or to the northern gully where the bank has recently been planted with three and a half thousand kaffir lilies (Clivia miniata cv.s and C.m.'Belgian hybrids' in orange and yellow). These will be shaded by a median canopy of tree ferns (Cyathea cooperi) and seventeen recently introduced specimens of the dwarf date palm, (Phoenix roebelenii). A number of frangipani have been planted (Plumeria rubra & other spp.), banks of ornamental gingers (Hedychium spp., Alpinia spp., etc) and red crucifix orchids (Epidendron ibaguense) in the shade and honeysuckles such as the giant Burmese honeysuckle (Lonicera hildebrandeana), trained on the south side of the house to Bronte Road and on the house's south-western 'turret', along with a more "cottage garden" effect in borders close to the house, river lilies (Crinum asiaticum and C.pedunculatum) areas of succulents and cycads (e.g. sago palm, Cycas revoluta in a grove at the base of the rockery) over rocky banks in the Victorian rockery, replacing bromeliads in this area which were not doing well - these were moved into shadier sections of the garden. A pair of surviving red oleanders (Nerium oleander cv.) have been kept flanking the southeastern steps into the house. An old Camellia japonica cv. (single carmine) remains planted south-east of the house. Red and purple forms of Alternanthera sp. have been clipped into shapes giving colour and contrast in the borders. Red forms of New Zealand flax (Phormium cookianum cv. "Rubrum" and 'Purpureum'(?) give height and contrast to other plants in borders and in the rockery. Spiky plants are used to provide contrast, such as Puya sp. and the giant sea holly, Eryngium giganteum) with its "razor" edged sword-like leaves in a mound.

Palms in the garden include a mature remaining Canary Island palm (Phoenix canariensis), mature bangalow palms (Archontophoenix cunninghamiana), mature cluster and Lord Howe Island palms, (Kentia belmoreana & K.fosteriana), the red latan palm with red stalks (Latania lontaroides), mature Cocos Island palms (Syragus romanzoffianum) (removed), blue/silver Yatay palm (Butia capitata) from Argentina. A tall bird-of-paradise plant (Strelitzia nicolae) with its white and blue flowers and banana like leaves is a dominant feature here also. Collections and clusters of small feature plants in decorative pots are features near doorways and entries. These contain houseleeks (Sempervivum spp./cv.s), a collection of begonias (B.spp./cv.s) on a wire rack in the north-western house porch and Zygopetalum orchids in matching pots on the same porch. European plants like salvias are arranged in block plantings side by side with gingers and succulents. Other areas of the garden have been planted eclectically, in themed family groupings. Although the majority of plants aren't the original species or cultivars used, the thematic planning remains true to the era.

In 2014 it was reported in the Wentworth Courier that a range of repair and conservation works were completed, and it was ready for negotiations for a new lessee.

== Heritage listing ==
On 2 April 1999 Bronte House was listed on the New South Wales State Heritage Register with the following statement of significance:

Bronte House is of a style not commonly found in Australian Colonial architecture, with its superb siting and substantial garden it is a significant essay in the picturesque. The property has connections with colonial architect Mortimer Lewis and more importantly with Robert Lowe, later created Viscount Sherbrooke. It is especially notable stylistically as an individual mid-Victorian design reflecting a romantic and picturesque interpretation of the medieval past. It is substantially intact and retains its outstanding original setting. Bronte House is the oldest known residence in the Waverley Council area. A historic, extremely rare, picturesque garden constructed in a naturally irregular site as a setting for an equally picturesque colonial house by one of the colony's rarest inhabitants - a cultivated lady. Bronte House is one of Australia's most picturesque surviving colonial residences and dates back to 1845. Built in the 'Gothick' taste so fashionable in the late 18th & early 19th centuries it is a perfect example of the cottage ornee, not a mansion but a romantic retreat from more formal city life. Its restored and adapted garden is now a small scale botanic garden, a repository for rare and beautiful plants, and one of Australia's best new private gardens.

— Statement of significance, New South Wales State Heritage Register.

As at 8 December 2003, Bronte house is of a style not commonly found in Australian Colonial architecture, with its superb siting and substantial garden it is a significant essay in the picturesque. The property has connections with colonial architect Mortimer Lewis and more importantly with Robert Lowe, later created Viscount Sherbrooke. It is especially notable stylistically as an individual mid-Victorian design reflecting a romantic and picturesque interpretation of the medieval past. It is substantially intact and retains its outstanding original setting. Bronte House is the oldest known residence in the Waverley Council area.

A picturesque garden was also constructed in a naturally irregular site as a setting for the house.

Bronte House is one of Australia's surviving colonial residences and dates back to 1845. Built in the "Gothick" taste in the late 18th & early 19th centuries, it is an example of the cottage ornee. Its restored and adapted garden is now a small scale botanic garden, a repository for rare plants, and one of Australia's new private gardens.

Bronte House was listed on the New South Wales State Heritage Register on 2 April 1999.

== Early residents ==
The following families have lived in Bronte House:

Order	Owner / Resident	Period	Notes
1	Robert and Georgina Lowe	1843–1849	
2	George Alfred Lloyd	1853	
3	J Lublin	1853–1854	
4	John James Falconer	1854–1861	
5	Joseph B Holdsworth and family	1861–1882	
6	Stanley Ebsworth and family	1882–1948	
7	Waverley Council	1948–present	

In the mid 1980s extensive restoration work was undertaken and Bronte House now remains in its former glory and is the oldest known home still standing in the Waverley Council area.

== See also ==
- Australian residential architectural styles
