= Bruce Hopkins =

Bruce Hopkins is the name of:

- Bruce Hopkins (actor) (born 1955), actor from New Zealand
- Bruce Hopkins (rugby league) (1924–2013), Australian rugby league player
- Bruce Hopkins (surf lifesaver) (born 1968), lifeguard at Bondi Beach, Sydney
