= Myles Baldwin =

Australian landscape designer

- Born: 6 October 1978 (age 48); Australia
- Education: Newington College
- Occupations: Horticulturalist; Landscape designer
- Website: Myles Balwin Design

Myles Cameron Baldwin (born 6 October 1978) is an Australian horticulturalist, landscape designer, writer and curator of the Australian Garden Show Sydney. He was named as one of "Australia's top 100 young leaders" by The Australian in 2009, and in 2010 was the Horticultural Ambassador for Macquarie Visions. Baldwin has worked on Sydney's largest private garden, Swifts, Darling Point, and Government House, Sydney.

== Early life ==
Baldwin was born in Sydney and grew up in Sylvania. He was educated at Newington College (1991–1996).

== Career ==
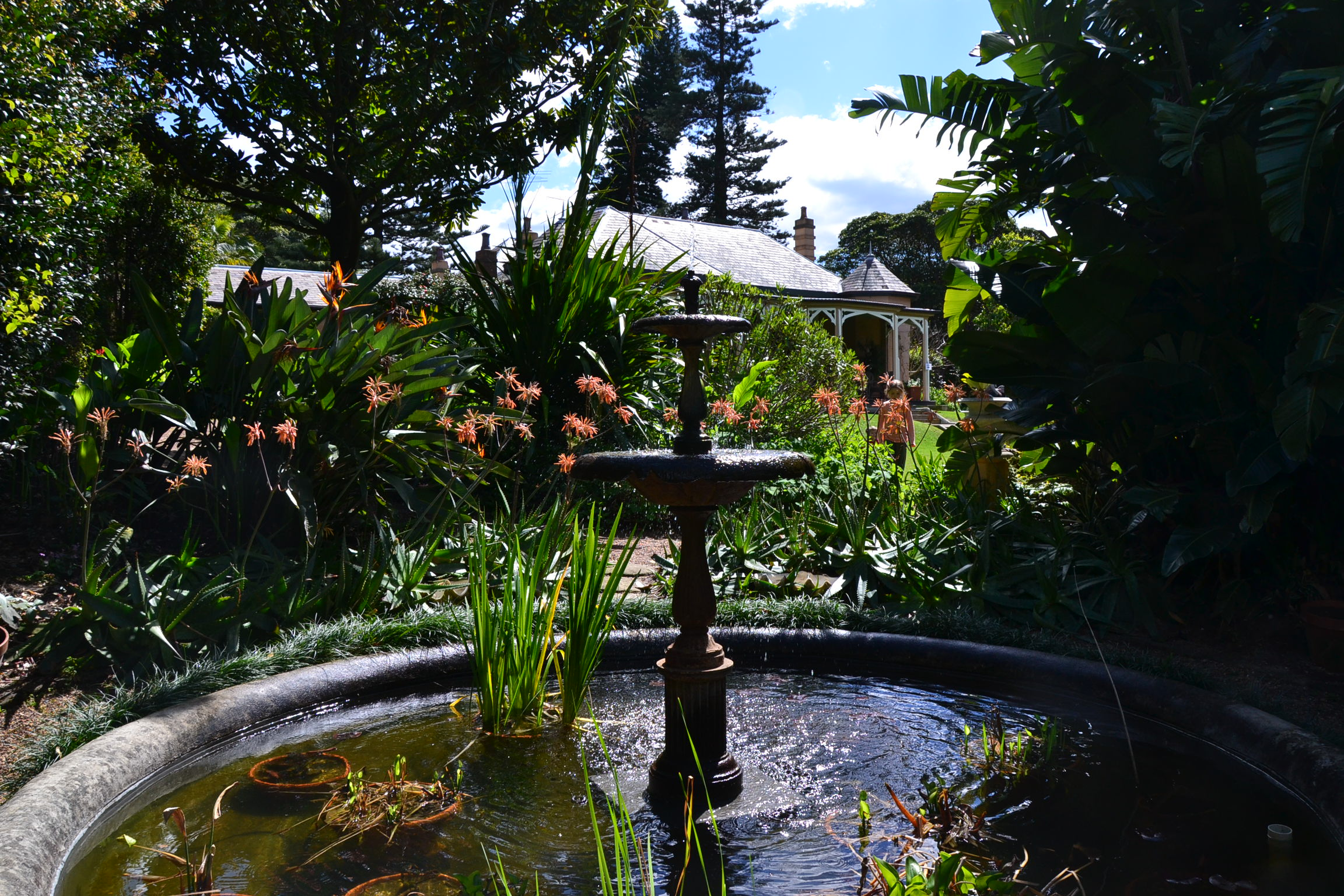
Baldwin is the head gardener at Bronte House

Baldwin worked as an horticultural apprentice at the Royal Botanic Gardens, Sydney where he received the Director's Award for Excellence and Achievement. He then assumed the role as head gardener at the heritage property Bronte House, a c1845 Mortimer Lewis cottage in the Sydney suburb of Bronte, New South Wales. Baldwin is director of Myles Baldwin Design Pty Ltd, and has been responsible for designing the period gardens at Boomerang in Elizabeth Bay, the John Verge mansion Lyndhurst in Glebe, heritage-listed home Rona at Bellevue Hill, New South Wales and The Speakers Garden in Parliament House, Sydney. He has also worked with many of Australia's leading architects on contemporary properties throughout Australia.

== Media presenter ==
Baldwin has appeared on the Today show and Brendan Moar's Gardening Show on Foxtel and was a presenter on Our Place TCN9 and has been the gardening columnist for Sydney's Sunday Herald.

== Publications ==
- Period gardens: landscapes for houses with history by Myles Baldwin with photography by Simon Griffiths (Sydney : Murdoch Books, 2008) ISBN 9781740459068
- Rural Australian gardens by Myles Baldwin with photography by Simon Griffiths (Sydney : Murdoch Books, 2010) ISBN 9781741964707
- Australian Coastal Gardens by Myles Baldwin with photography by Sue Stubbs (Sydney : Murdoch Books, 2013) ISBN 9781742666204
