= Bronte, New South Wales =

Bronte
- Suburb
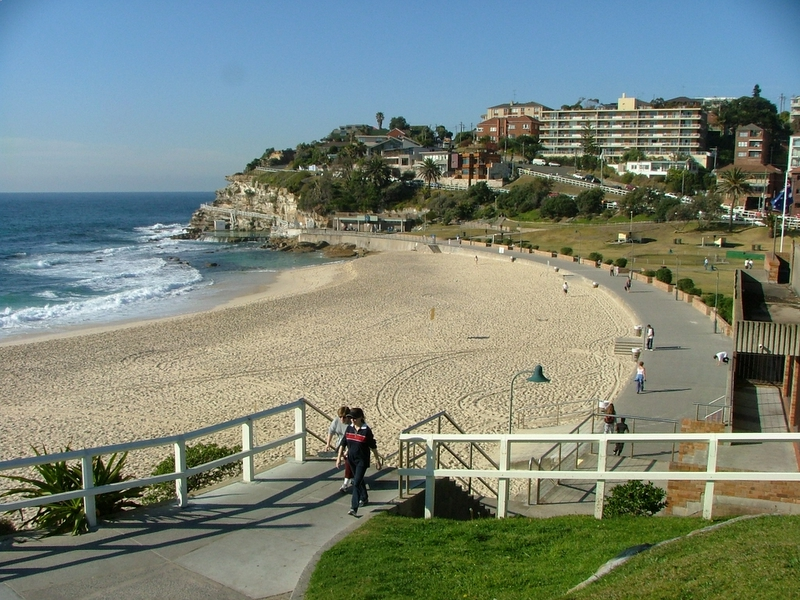
- Bronte Beach

- Interactive map of Bronte
- Country: Australia
- State: New South Wales
- City: Sydney
- LGA: Waverley Council
- Location: 7 km (4.3 mi) E of Sydney central business district

Government
  - State electorate: Coogee
  - Federal division: Wentworth

Area
  - Total: 1.33 km^{2} (0.51 sq mi)

Population
  - Total: 7,166 (2021 census)
  - Density: 5,388/km^{2} (13,950/sq mi)
- Postcode: 2024
Suburbs around Bronte
| Waverley | Bondi | Tamarama |
| Waverley | Bronte | Tasman Sea |
| Randwick | Clovelly | Tasman Sea |

Bronte is a beachside Eastern Suburb of Sydney, in the state of New South Wales, Australia. Bronte Beach is located 7 kilometres east of the Sydney central business district, in the Waverley Council local government area of the Eastern Suburbs.

Bronte Beach sits on Nelson Bay, surrounded by Bronte Park. Bronte offers scenic cliff-top walking paths south to Coogee via the Waverley Cemetery and north to Bondi Beach, via Tamarama and Mackenzies Bay. The cliff-top path offers views which extend from Ben Buckler in the north to Malabar in the south. Bronte is located about 2.5 km south of Bondi Beach.

The suburb has previously been declared the best of 641 Sydney suburbs by the Sydney Morning Herald's Good Suburbs Guide in 2008.

== History ==
=== First Australian history ===
There is no clear evidence for the name or names of the indigenous bands or clans who were the original custodians of the area prior to the 1788 European settlement of Australia. Most sources agree on the Cadigal, but some sources name the Biddigal and Birrabirragal bands as well. There was a large natural "bogey hole" at the southern end of the beach, the name of which derived from the local Aboriginal term for "swimming place", but the original bogey hole was substantially destroyed during the late 19th and early 20th centuries, and the current bogey hole was artificially constructed in the early 20th century.

Owing to the devastating effects of the European invasion on Aboriginal peoples, including forced displacement and the catastrophic impact of introduced European diseases such as smallpox, most or all of the original indigenous inhabitants of the area were killed by disease or forced to move further inland during the late 18th and early 19th century, resulting in the near-total loss of indigenous cultural knowledge about the area, and this had been compounded by the massive residential and commercial development of the area, which has destroyed nearly all archaeological evidence of the indigenous occupation and use of the land and seashore around what is now known as "Nelson Bay".

=== Modern history ===
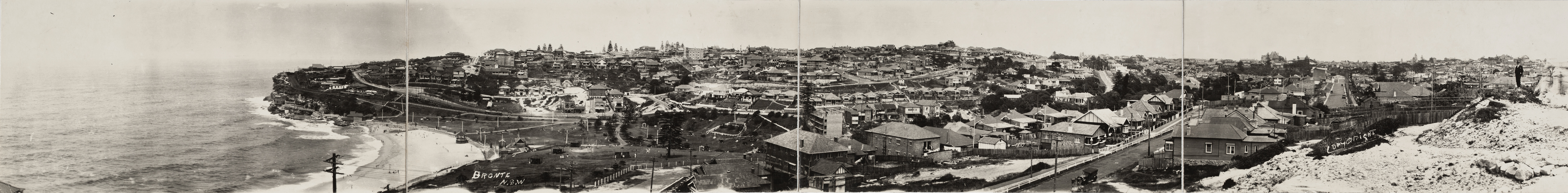
Panorama of Bronte, Sydney, 1927

Robert Lowe, who later became Viscount Sherbrooke, bought 17 hectares (42 acres) of land from Mortimer Lewis, the English-born Australian Colonial Architect who was given a free grant of most of the frontage in the area in the 1830s. His home was completed in 1845 and was named Bronte House, for Lord Nelson, who was the Duke of Bronte, a place in Sicily, Italy. The house, a single-storey stone bungalow located in Bronte Road, is owned by Waverley Council and leased to private tenants who hold open days a few times a year. It is listed on the New South Wales State Heritage Register and on the (now defunct) Register of the National Estate.

Lowe became a member of the New South Wales Legislative Council. He later moved back to England where he became a writer with The Times.

=== Trams ===
The former Bronte tram line branched from the North Bondi via Bondi Junction line at Bondi Junction, running down Bronte Road and MacPherson Street to Bronte Beach. A feature of this line was the final approach to Bronte Beach in a rock cutting leading to the Pacific Ocean cliff tops. The line opened to Waverley in 1890, then to Bronte in 1911. Electric services started to Waverley in 1902, then Bronte in 1911. Through services ran from Circular Quay or Railway Square. The line was closed in 1960 and replaced by a bus service that follows the route between Bronte and Bondi Junction of bus 378 (440 from 2015 and 379 from early 2018).

== Heritage listings ==
Bronte has a number of heritage-listed sites, including:

- 470 Bronte Road: Bronte House
- St Thomas Street: Waverley Cemetery

== Demographics ==
According to the 2021 census of Population, there were 7,166 residents in Bronte. In Bronte, 65.2% of people were born in Australia. The most common countries of birth were England 8.1%, New Zealand 2.6%, United States of America 1.8% and South Africa 1.6%. 81.2% of people only spoke English at home. Other languages spoken at home included French at 1.7%. The most common responses for religion were No Religion 47.3%, Catholic 21.9% and Anglican 10.4%.

== Culture ==
In recent years Bronte's eating scene has developed, with the introduction of several popular restaurants in and in close proximity to Macpherson St.

== Sport and recreation ==
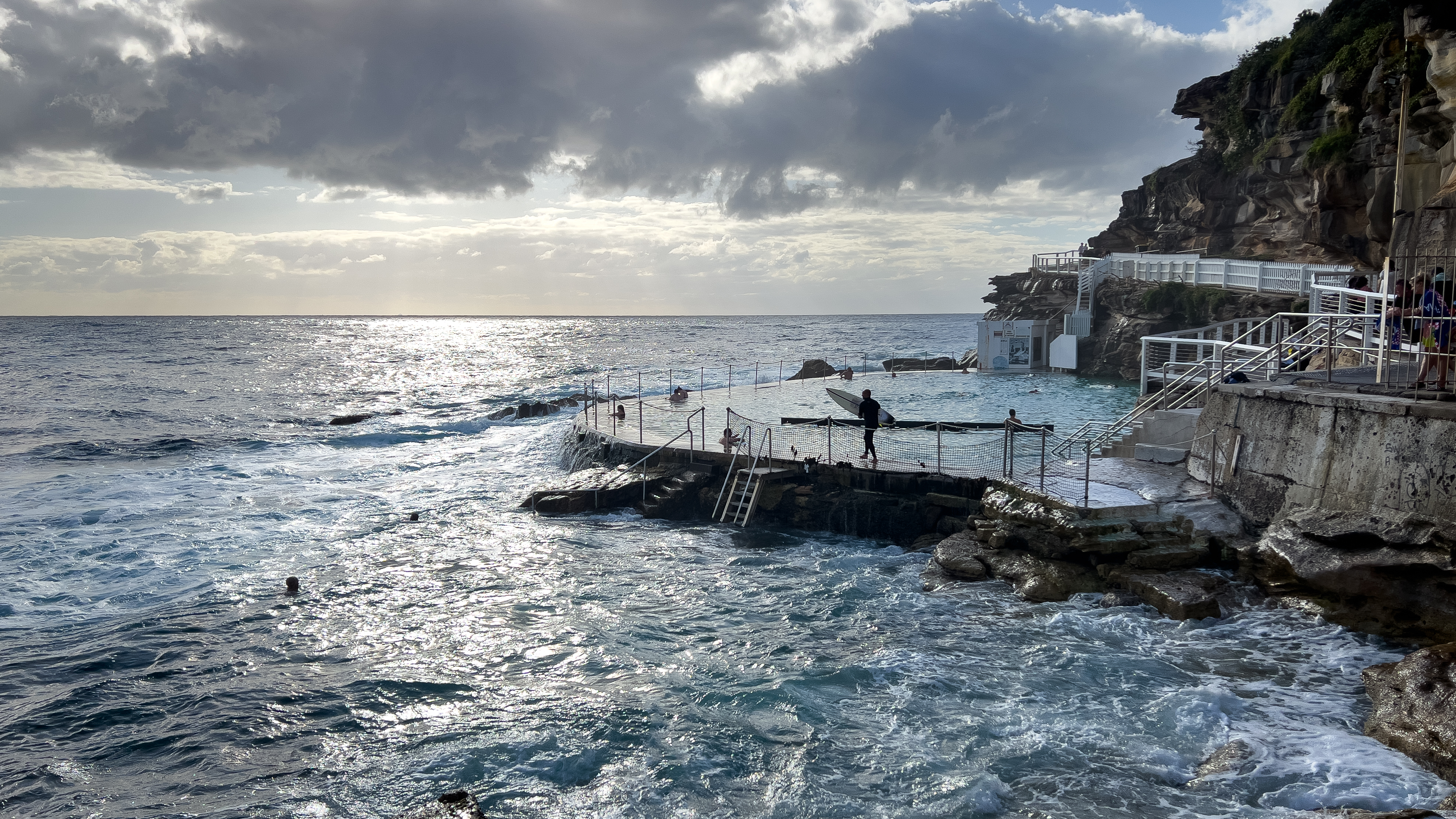
Bronte Baths, 2023

Bronte has an important surfing culture. The Bronte Surf Lifesaving Club was founded in 1903 and claims to be the oldest surf lifesaving club in the world. An annual long-distance ocean swimming event is held in December each year between Bondi Beach and Bronte.

According to The Dictionary of Sydney, it is believed that the famous swimming style generally known as the "Australian crawl" was first seen at Bronte Baths in 1899.

Bronte is represented in one of the most popular sporting competitions across Australia, the National Rugby League competition, by the local team the Sydney Roosters, officially the Eastern Suburbs District Rugby League Football Club (ESDRLFC).

The Bronte Splashers Winter Swimming Club claims to be the oldest Winter Swimming club in the world founded in 1921 and compete against Bondi Icebergs Winter Swimming Club, South Maroubra Dolphins Winter Swimming Club, Cronulla Polar Bears Winter Swimming Club, Maroubra Seals Winter Swimming Club, Coolangatta Surf Life Saving Club, Clovelly Eskimos Winter Swimming Club, Coogee Penguins Winter Swimming Club, Wollongong Whales and Cottesloe Crabs in the Winter Swimming Association of Australia Championships.

== Notable residents ==
- Dave Brown (1913–1974) – described by football historians as 'the Bradman of Rugby League' was raised near Bronte Beach where his parents operated the dressing sheds. His father, Denis 'Dinny' Brown, was Waverley Council's first lifeguard.
- Cressida Campbell – artist
- Ryan Clark – former child actor best known for playing Sam Marshall in Home and Away, was raised in Bronte and still lives there with his family. He left the show in 2001 and is now a Waverley Council lifeguard.
- Bruce Hopkins – surf lifesaver
- Deborah Hutton – media personality
- Andrew Johns – former NRL player and football commentator
- Heath Ledger – Academy Award-winning actor, lived in Bronte from 2004 until 2006 when he sold his house due to intense bombardment from paparazzi.
- Peter Dodds McCormick (1834–1916) – was the composer of the national anthem "Advance Australia Fair". He lived at Clydebank, 5 Virgil Street (now 20 Yanko Avenue) in Bronte and was an elder at Grahame Memorial Presbyterian Church.
- Jessi Miley-Dyer – surfer
- Alan Morrison – army general
- Scott Morrison – 30th Prime Minister of Australia, grew up in Bronte
- Marjorie O'Neill – politician
- Natasha Oakley – model
- Dick Persson – public servant
- Victor Radley – rugby league player
- Dick See – rugby league player

== Gallery ==
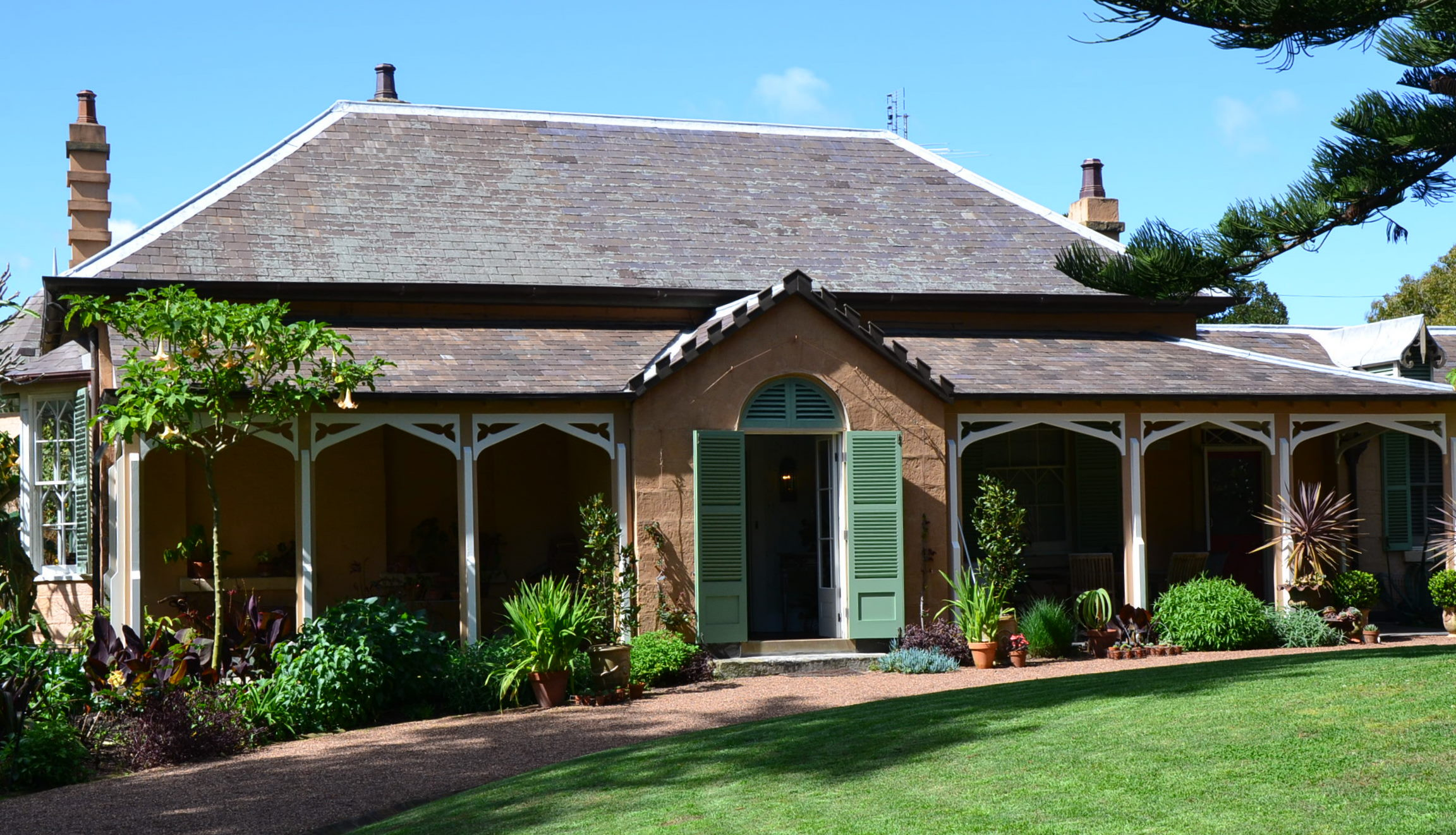
Bronte House

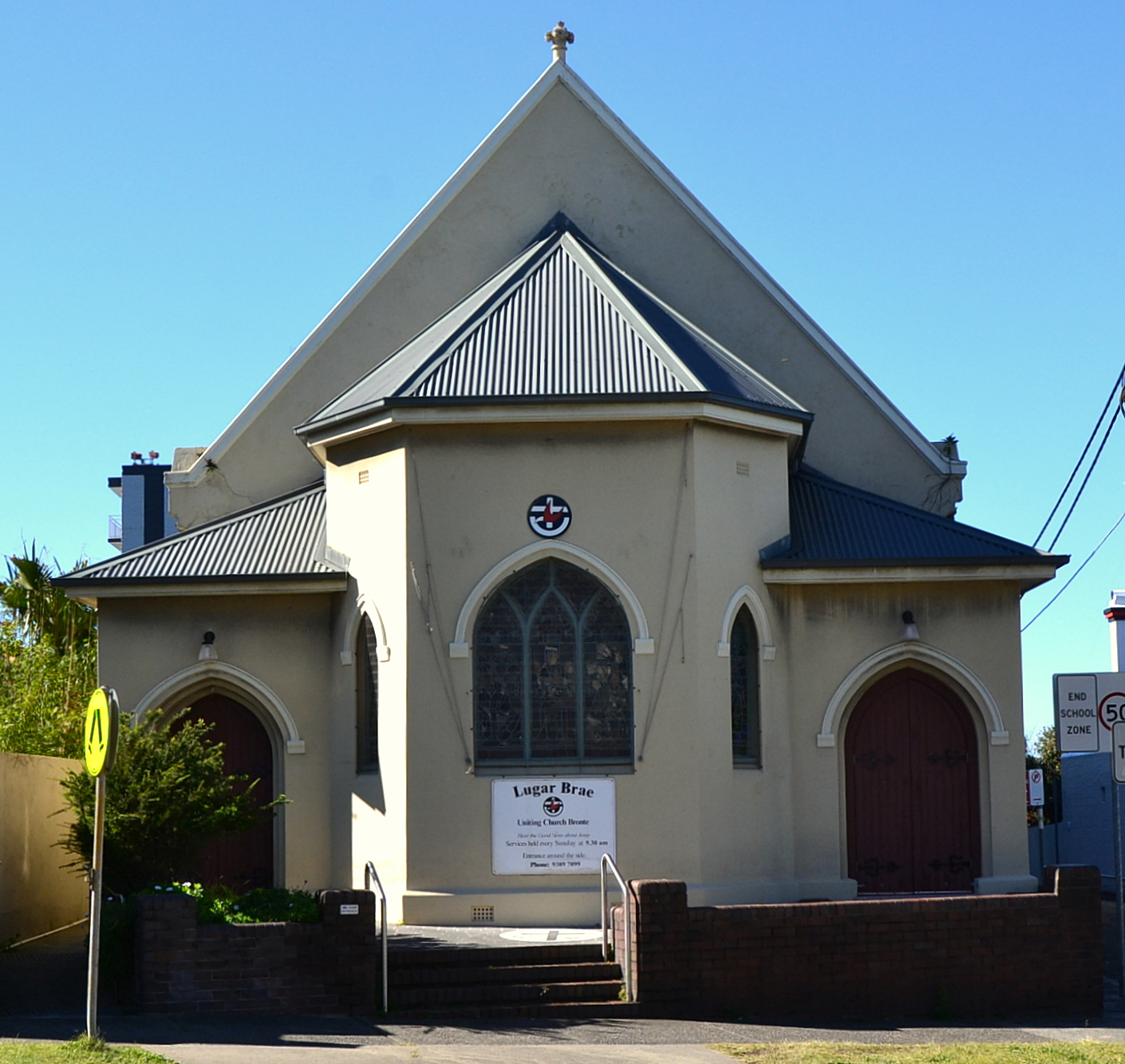
Uniting Church, Leichhardt Street

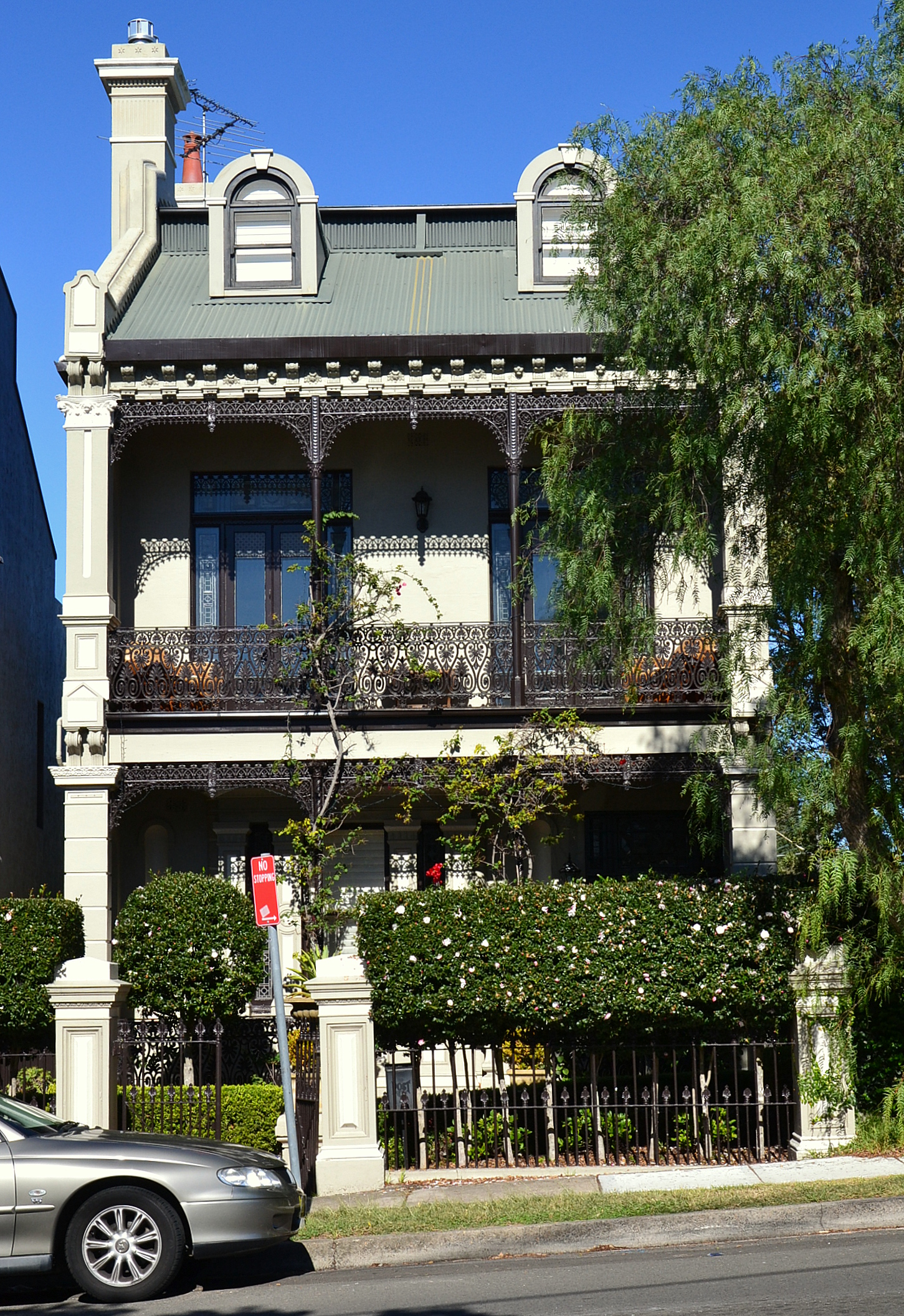
Heritage-listed house, Bronte Road

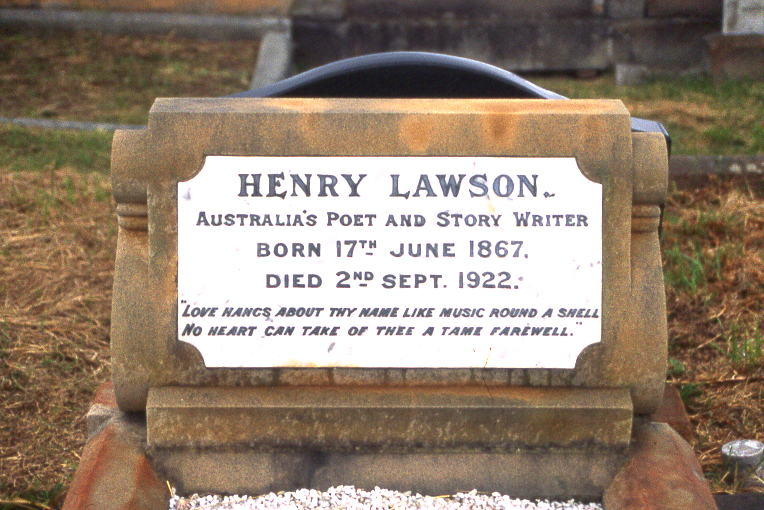
Grave of Henry Lawson, Waverley Cemetery

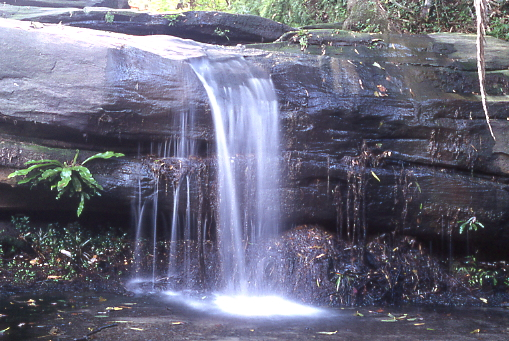
Waterfall, Bronte Gully
