= Eli Verschleiser =

American businessman from New York City (born 1974)

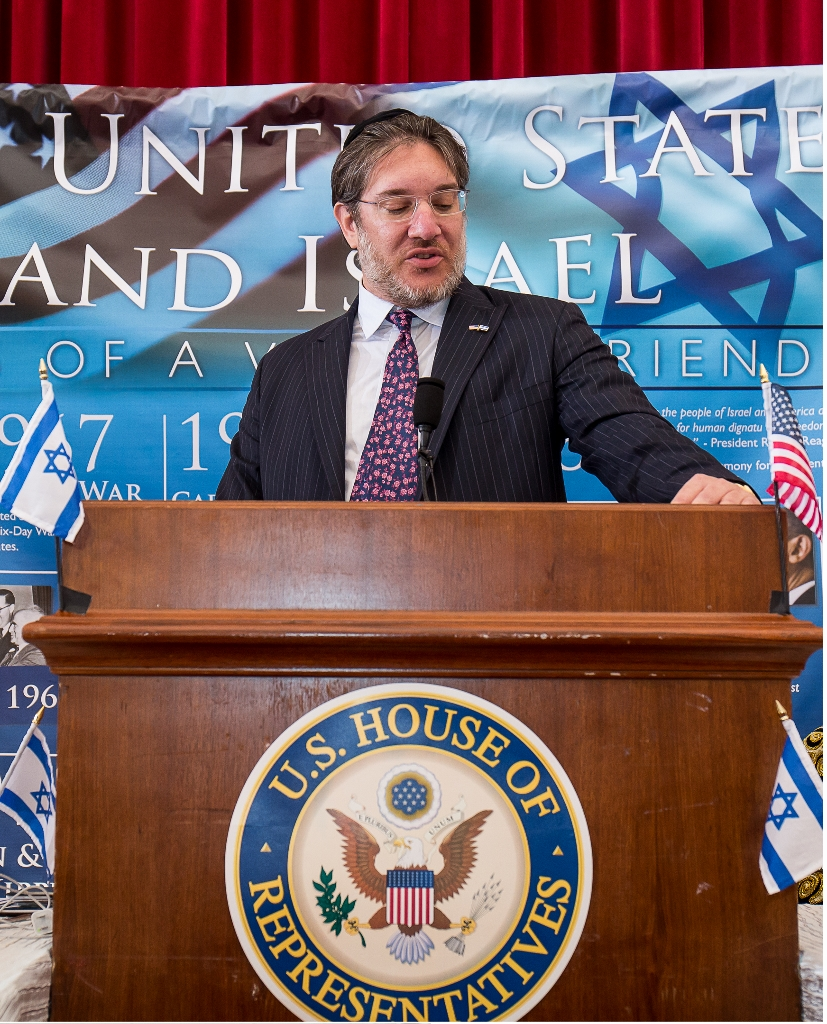
- Eli Verschleiser in 2015
- Born: 1974 (age 51–52); New York City, New York
- Occupation: Private Equity Real Estate
- Known for: Business and Philanthropy
- Spouse(s): Dr. Shani Verschleiser, AuD., LCSW
- Website: eliv.com

Eli Verschleiser is an American businessman from New York City.

== Real estate and career ==
Eli Verschleiser is a founding partner and Chairman of the Multi Group of Companies. Through his companies Mr. Verschleiser has participated in $10+ billion of real estate transactions, including over two million square feet of office buildings, multi family, and residential condominium projects. In 2012, Verschleiser co-founded a $1 billion dollar public REIT.

== Philanthropy ==
Eli Verschleiser serves on the board of The American Jewish Congress. He is a Co-Founder & Chairman for Our Place (Foundation), a non-profit organization that provides support for troubled Jewish youth. He is also Co-Founder for Magenu, an organization he helped create with his wife Dr. Shani Verschleiser to protect children from CSA.

== Media ==
The offices of Eli Verschleiser has been named NYC's most historic offices by The New York Post. Verschleiser has been cited in the media for helping aspiring entrepreneurs as a Mogul in a show similar to Shark Tank called Biz Tank. He has financed numerous startups both on and off the show.

== Books ==
- Verschleiser, Eli. So You Want to Get Into Real Estate?: A Primer for Everyone Who Wants to Be "In Real Estate". Eli Verschleiser & Co, March 31, 2026. ISBN 978-0997334432. ASIN B0FT6NB38L.
- Verschleiser, Eli and Verschleiser, Shani. Tali Learns to Trust Her Gut (MSP "The Safety Patrol Kids"). MagenU.

== Journalism and Op-Eds ==
Verschleiser is a frequent contributor to news and opinion publications on topics spanning politics, U.S.–Israel relations, child safety, and social services. His writing has appeared in The Huffington Post, The Jerusalem Post, The Times of Israel, The Hill, New York Observer, Algemeiner Journal, The Jewish Press, American Thinker, Arutz Sheva/Israel National News, The Moscow Times, The Jewish World Review, and The Five Towns Jewish Times, among others.

Notable published pieces include:

- "Governor Cuomo and Legislature Must Show Leadership on Abuse" (HuffPost, 2016), advocating for the passage of the Markey Bill to eliminate New York's civil statute of limitations for child sexual abuse claims.
- "Israel's Iron Dome Supporters Deserve Our Recognition" (Times of Israel, 2015), written in connection with his co-chairing of the U.S.–Israel Security Alliance Congressional Tribute at the Cannon House Office Building.
- "Could the Mideast Use Some 'Trumpification'?" (Algemeiner Journal / Times of Israel, 2017, updated 2024), examining U.S. foreign policy and Middle East diplomacy.
- "Jesse Jackson, Antisemitism, and Zionism: A Complicated Legacy" (Times of Israel, 2026).
