= Bruce Hopkins (surf lifesaver) =

Australian lifeguard (born 1968)

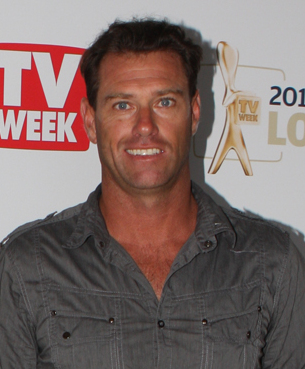
- Hopkins in 2012
- Born: 12 November 1968 (age 57); Sydney, New South Wales
- Other name: Hoppo
- Occupations: Lifeguard, television personality, radio presenter, speaker, commercial endorser
- Known for: Bondi Rescue
- Spouse: Karen Griffin (m. 2020)
- Children: 2

Bruce Hopkins (born 12 November 1968) is an Australian professional lifeguard. He is the head of the Waverley Council lifeguards and can be seen on the reality television series Bondi Rescue.

== Career ==
Hopkins briefly worked for 2GB prior to becoming a full-time lifeguard. He has worked as a lifeguard with Waverley Council, which oversees Bondi, Tamarama and Bronte Beaches, since 1991 and has been involved in more resuscitations than any other lifeguard in the service. He was appointed head lifeguard in 2000 and is one of the longest serving and most experienced lifeguards on the roster.

In 2006 he won the Australian Lifeguard of the year award, and has recently picked up 2 Gold medals at the Australian Surf Lifesaving titles in the Double Ski and the Board Paddle.

As Bondi's Head Lifeguard, Hopkins had appeared in sixteen seasons of the hit television show, Bondi Rescue. The Network Ten show is based around the Lifeguard Service at Bondi Beach following the numerous rescues and day-to-day activities. The show airs in over 180 countries worldwide, has six Logie Awards, and had nine nominations for 'Most Popular Factual Television Show'. The show has reached over 1.6 million viewers during the highest rating period and is the most watched show on the Discovery Channel.

Hopkins is a regular guest speaker at various international corporations and organisations about his role as Head Lifeguard, expertise in water safety, leadership and teamwork management.

Recent press coverage has included a photo shoot with international supermodel, Karlie Kloss. Coverage ran in Vogue Australia, OK!, Who, Daily Mail and Channel Ten.

Hopkins was recently interviewed on The Project, Ten News, Seven Network, Nine Network, Studio 10, NOVA, KIIS FM & WSFM and more reaching over 10 million people in conjunction with a national water safety campaign to highlight water safety in the ocean and back yard pools given the recent drowning epidemic.

As President of Surf Education International (SEI), an organisation that specialises in the education of water safety with a key focus to minimise drowning numbers globally. SEI has taken Hopkins around the world as a consultant to Japan, India, Maldives, Dubai, UK and Sweden.

Hopkins has worked with brands for endorsement and commercial partnerships including; Virgin Atlantic, UNIQLO, Holeproof Undies, Samsung, Australian Tourism, G’Day LA, Energizer, Bondi Lifeguard Sun Care, Clever Buoy, Stella & Marco Skincare, Casio Watches, LIIVE Sunglasses, Optus, Heineken, QT Hotels & Resorts and Moccona Coffee.

== Personal life ==
Hopkins was born and raised in Bronte and has been competing in surf competitions since the age of six.

Hopkins was married to Karen Griffin on 18 September 2020 on Sydney's Northern Beaches where they now both reside.

Hopkins has two daughters, Lauren (26) and Georgia (22)
