= Our House =

Our House may refer to:

== Film and television ==
- Our House (2003 film) or Duplex, an American film by Danny DeVito
- Our House (2006 film), a television movie starring Doris Roberts
- Our House (2018 film), an American-Canadian-German film by Anthony Scott Burns
- Our House (2026 film), a Northern Irish film by Peter Young
- Our House (1960 TV series), a British sitcom starring Hattie Jacques
- Our House (Australian TV series), an Australian lifestyle/DIY program
- Our House (American TV series), a 1986–1988 American drama television series that aired on NBC
- "Our House" (Degrassi: The Next Generation), an episode of Degrassi: The Next Generation
- Our House, the cover show for the British children's game show Hider in the House
- Our House (South Korean TV series), a 2024 South Korean television series

== Music ==
- Our House (band), an Australian band
- "Our House" (Crosby, Stills, Nash & Young song) (1970)
- "Our House" (Madness song) (1982)
  - Our House (musical), a 2002 musical based on the songs of Madness
  - Our House: The Original Songs, a 2002 greatest hits album by Madness, and the soundtrack to the musical

== Other uses ==
- Our House, a 2018 award-winning novel by Louise Candlish
- Our House (Gallipolis, Ohio), a National Register of Historic Places listing in Gallia County, Ohio
- Our House, a 2009 play by Theresa Rebeck

== See also ==
- Our Place (disambiguation)
