= Our Place (Australian TV series) =

- Presented by: Scott Cam; Cherie Hausler
- Country of origin: Australia
- No. of episodes: 5

Production
- Running time: 44 mins.

Original release
- Network: Channel Nine
- Release: 15 April – 27 May 2005

Our Place was a short-lived Australian weekly live variety lifestyle programme broadcast on the Nine Network during early 2005.

== Overview ==
Hosts Scott Cam and Cherie Hausler were joined by experts, which included unrelated Simone Maher and Jackie Adams-Maher for pets, Myles Baldwin for gardening, Dr John Tickell for health, Maggie Beer for food and Tara Dennis for home makeovers.

After 17 years on Australian television, Don Burke's Burke's Backyard was cancelled at the end of 2004 and left the all-important Friday evening 7:30 to 8:30 p.m. time slot, which led into Nine's Friday Night Football, open. After much hype and anticipation Our Place hit the screens on 15 April 2005 (delayed by a week due to the broadcast of the Pope John Paul II's funeral).

== Cancellation ==
However, after just five episodes, Our Place was cancelled due to poor ratings and broadcast its final show on Friday 27 May 2005. The time slot has since been occupied by reality shows such as Motorway Patrol and Survivor: Guatemala. Channel 9 tried to revive the series to air during the non-ratings summer season, but there were no takers.

== See also ==
- List of Australian television series
- List of programs broadcast by Nine Network
