= Our Place (organization) =

- Our Place in NY Inc
- Formation: 1998
- Tax ID no.: 11-3463309
- Legal status: Organization
- Purpose: Mentoring troubled Jewish adolescents and facilitate mental health healing for those in need.
- Headquarters: New York City, NY, U.S.
- Region served: United States
- Chairman: Eli Verschleiser
- Key people: Eli Verschleiser
- Website: www.ourplaceny.org

Our Place is an American not-for-profit organization (a "501(c) organization") which employs a multi-faceted approach to counseling, rehabilitating and guiding troubled youth with substance abuse issues. Our Place was created to assist, rehabilitate and mentor Jewish adolescents in their return to mainstream society. Our Place provides community, and services young and old alike.

== History ==
Our Place was established in 1998 in response to increased incidences of substance abuse, suicide and death among teenagers and young adults in Jewish communities in the New York City region. It was started as a safe haven or hang out for at-risk young people and now employs a multi-faceted approach to counseling, rehabilitating and guiding troubled youth. Members are sponsored for trips to Israel, around the New York City region, and the United States.

The organization targets young men and women, primarily between the ages of 15 - 25. It works primarily with youth from the greater New York City metropolitan area who have dropped out of high school. Additionally, its worldwide network assists youth in most major Jewish communities.

== Fundraising & Events ==
In 2008 Jackie Mason did a comedy show benefiting Our Place, and to raise awareness of teen substance abuse.

In 2011, Our Place began hosting its annual 5 kilometer run to raise awareness and funding for the organization.

In 2013 Lipa Schmeltzer created Team Lipa, and ran the annual Our Place 5 km.

In 2015 Our Place was a part of a weekend in The Hampton Synagogue which is run by Marc Schneier where over 500 people attended a weekend.

In 2019 Our Place had its inaugural tennis match event. Cross River bank and Our Place partnered for this annual event that attracts thousands of spectators named the Cross River Open.
