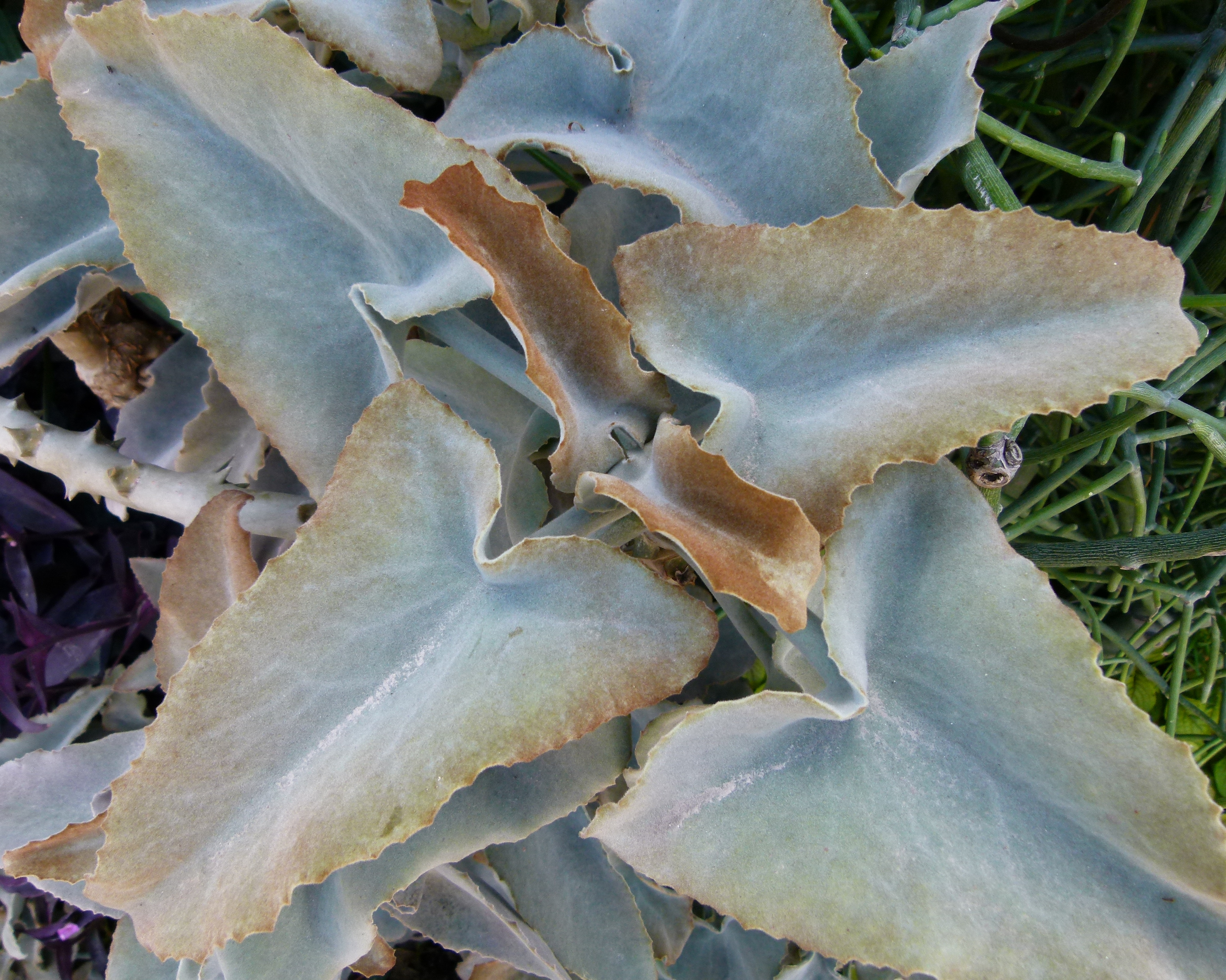

Scientific classification
- Kingdom: Plantae
- Clade: Tracheophytes
- Clade: Angiosperms
- Clade: Eudicots
- Order: Saxifragales
- Family: Crassulaceae
- Genus: Kalanchoe
- Species: K. beharensis

Binomial name
- Kalanchoe beharensis Drake

= Kalanchoe beharensis =

Species of succulent

Kalanchoe beharensis (commonly known as elephant's ear kalanchoe, felt bush, or feltbush) is a plant species in the succulent genus Kalanchoe, and the family Crassulaceae. Kalanchoe beharensis is native to Madagascar known by local names mongy, rongy and tavitavy.

== Description ==
Kalanchoe beharensis is an evergreen shrub, 3–5 ft (1–2 m) tall. The stem is about 1.5 m (4.9 ft) long, slender and knotted. Leaves are olive green, triangular-lanceolate shaped, decussately arranged (pairs at right-angles to each other) with leaf margins that are doubly crenate (crinkled). Each leaf is about 10 cm (4 in) long and 5–10 cm (2–4 in) wide. The bottoms of the leaves are glabrous (smooth and glossy), and covered with a woolly hair towards the apex. The leaf hairs are brown, and the tips of the teeth are darker. The hairs on the stem, younger leaves, and petioles (leaf stalks) are white. A sign of older leaves is concavity on the upper surface.

The types of trichome present on the leaves of Kalanchoe vary among the different species. The different types of trichomes are an indicator of adaptation to a particular environment. On the leaf blade of K. beharensis there are trichomes of the non-glandular, bushy three-branched type. This type of trichome is dead, with evidence of tannin. K. beharensis trichomes are also characterized by striped cuticular ornamentation on their surface. Glandular trichomes are also present on the leaves, with more on petioles than on leaf blades, and more on the top of the leaf as opposed to the bottom.

=== Inflorescences ===
Inflorescences are 50–60 cm (20–24 in) high, forming a branched corymb. Flowers are on short pedicels (stalks). The calyx is 7 mm long with lobes that are oblong and acuminate (tapering to a point). The corolla tube is urn-shaped and 7 mm long. Blooming occurs from spring to summer, and flowers are small and yellowish.

== Reproduction ==
The genus Kalanchoe may reproduce asexually by producing plantlets on leaf margins, which when distributed on a suitable substrate will form new plants. Plantlet-forming species fall under two categories. The first category is induced plantlet-forming species that produce plantlets under stress. The second plantlet-forming species is constitutive plantlet-forming species that spontaneously forms plantlets. Induced plantlet-forming species have the LEC1 gene that allows them to produce seeds, whereas the constitutive plantlet-forming species have a defective LEC1 gene and cannot produce seeds. K. beharensis produces seeds as well as plantlets.

== Defense system ==
Kalanchoe beharensis uses a system of defense, not unique to this plant, termed stress-limited defence. This system involves deterring herbivores (plant eating creatures) before a high stress level ensues causing cracking in the tissue of the plant. High hardness, a structural component of this system, is characterized by tissues with high density. Since the tissues of plants employing this defense system have a high density, the defenses, commonly spines, prickles, thorns and hair, must reside on the surface of the plant. Amorphous silica is found in the defense structures with a microhardness of about 5000 MPa, which is higher than the microhardness of insects, and of mammalian enamel with a microhardness of 3500 MPa. Through research, this defense system is shown to decrease the amount of plant matter eaten by vertebrate herbivores by reducing the size of the bite a herbivore takes, the volume of a bite, or the rate at which biting occurs.

== Carbon fixation ==
The first field study of crassulacean acid metabolism (CAM), a type of carbon fixation, by Kalanchoe beharensis was conducted on the cultivar 'Drake del Castillo', and published in a paper titled In situ studies of crassulacean acid metabolism in Kalanchoe beharensis Drake Del Castillo, a plant of the semi-arid southern region of Madagascar (by Kluge et al.); the study included information on diel patterns of CO_{2} exchange, transpiration, measurements of fluctuations in organic acid levels and PEP carboxylase properties and water relations. Some conclusions of the study were that K. beharensis advantageously and fully performs CAM during the entirety of the dry season, avoiding CAM idling; this is possible due to the species' ability to store and maintain sufficient moisture in its succulent leaves, specifically for rationing in periods of drought.

== Cultivation ==
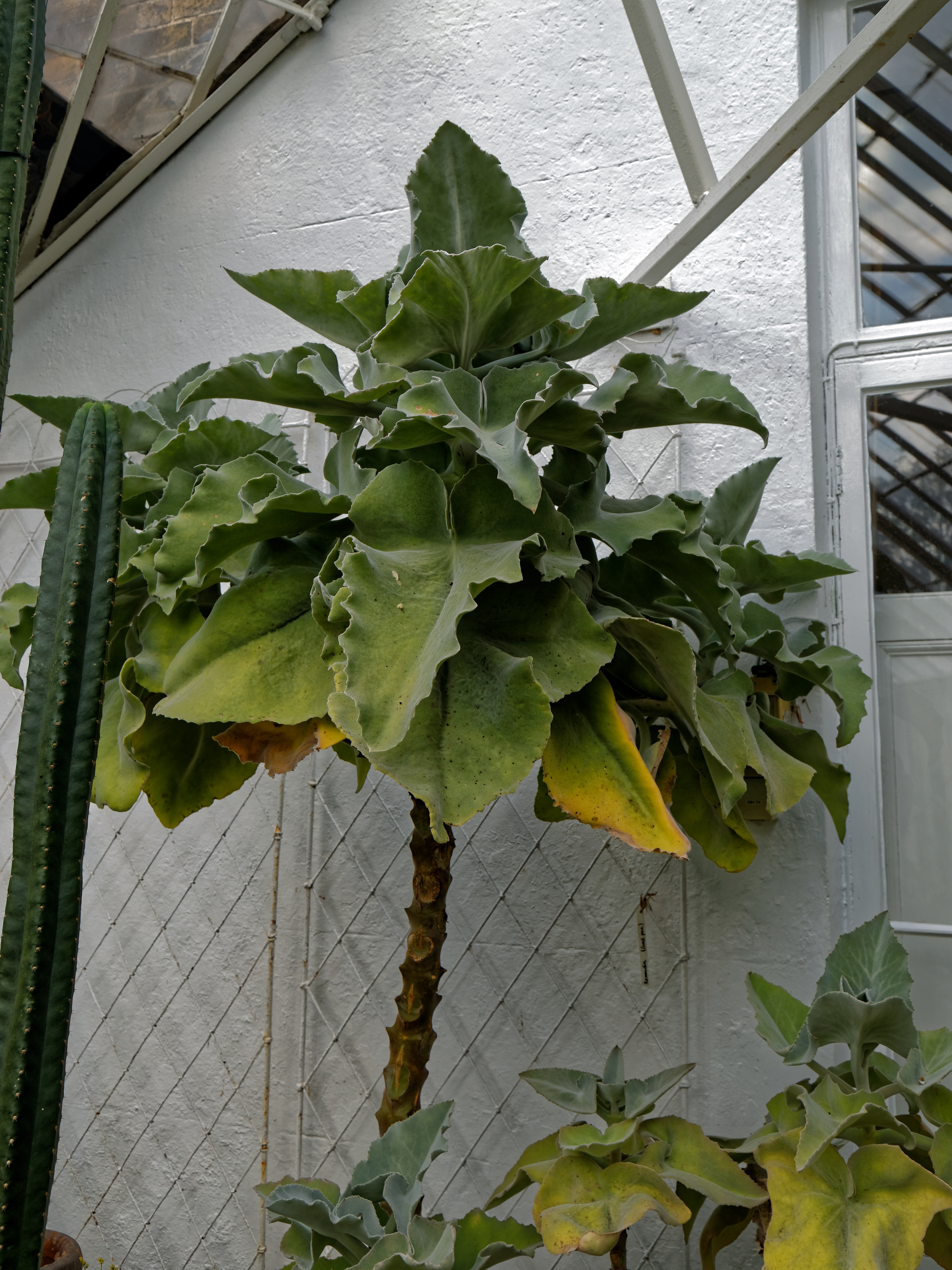
Cultivated in pots

It may be grown as a houseplant in a bright, sunny windows with sufficient aeration to prevent the proliferation of insect pests. They may live outdoors in mostly frost-free landscapes. It is naturally toxic to humans and cats, and may irritate and itch expose skin; the species is (reportedly) not toxic to dogs, provided the plant has not been treated with any chemicals (according to the National Animal Poison Information network). This plant needs full to partial sun, with intermediate to warm temperatures above 5 °C (41 °F). It will survive random bouts of frost on a scale from light to moderate, preferring to avoid it altogether. For growth in a greenhouse, K. beharensis will grow in a mixture of equal parts loam and sand, and one part extra perlite, pumice or other inert material for aeration and drainage. The plant should be dry before watering again, as too much water will kill it. Watering should occur every 10–14 days during the growing season. In the winter months it should be watered sparingly, possibly only once every thirty days. The species is highly resilient and will survive times of neglect if generally protected from harsh sun for prolonged periods.

Propagation is by seed, though most frequently and effectively is achieved via cuttings. Plants may be propagated with any stem, petiole or leaf cuttings, in which the mid-rib may be cut in various places, as the entire plant readily grows new roots when divided. The cuttings should be grown on a sandy, loose substrate and kept out of direct sun, but still given plenty of bright shade and indirect light. Dried sphagnum moss is also a viable substrate for propagating on, as it absorbs adequate moisture for developing plants while being aerated enough to prevent rotting. Leaf propagates are highly worthwhile in most instances, as the leaves of K. beharensis not only grow roots at the base or at the site of a cut, but will form new plantlets directly from the surface of the leaf itself, often at random.

Kalanchoe beharensis, as well as the cultivar 'Fang' (a cross with K. tomentosa), has gained the Royal Horticultural Society's Award of Garden Merit.

== Gallery ==
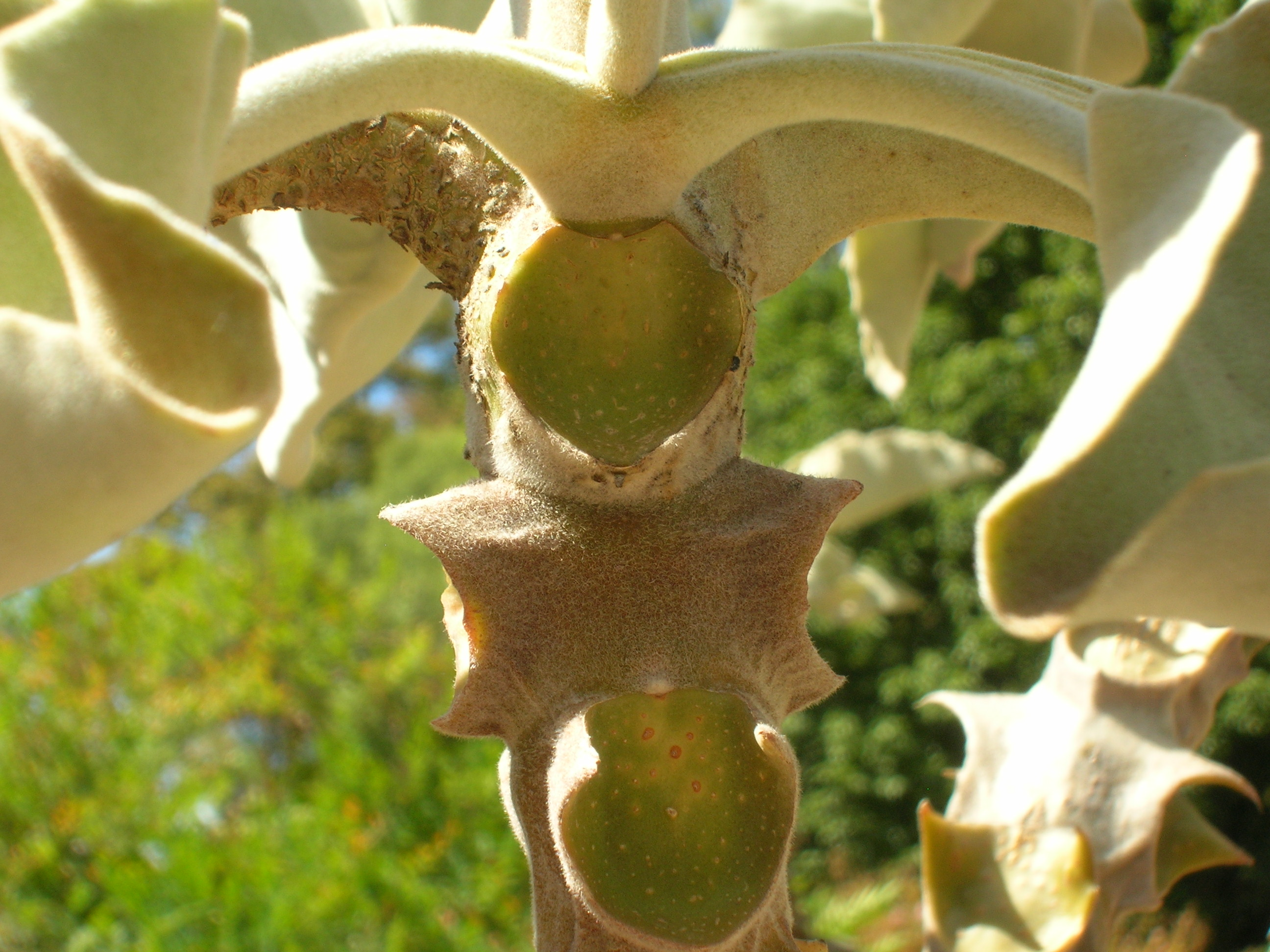

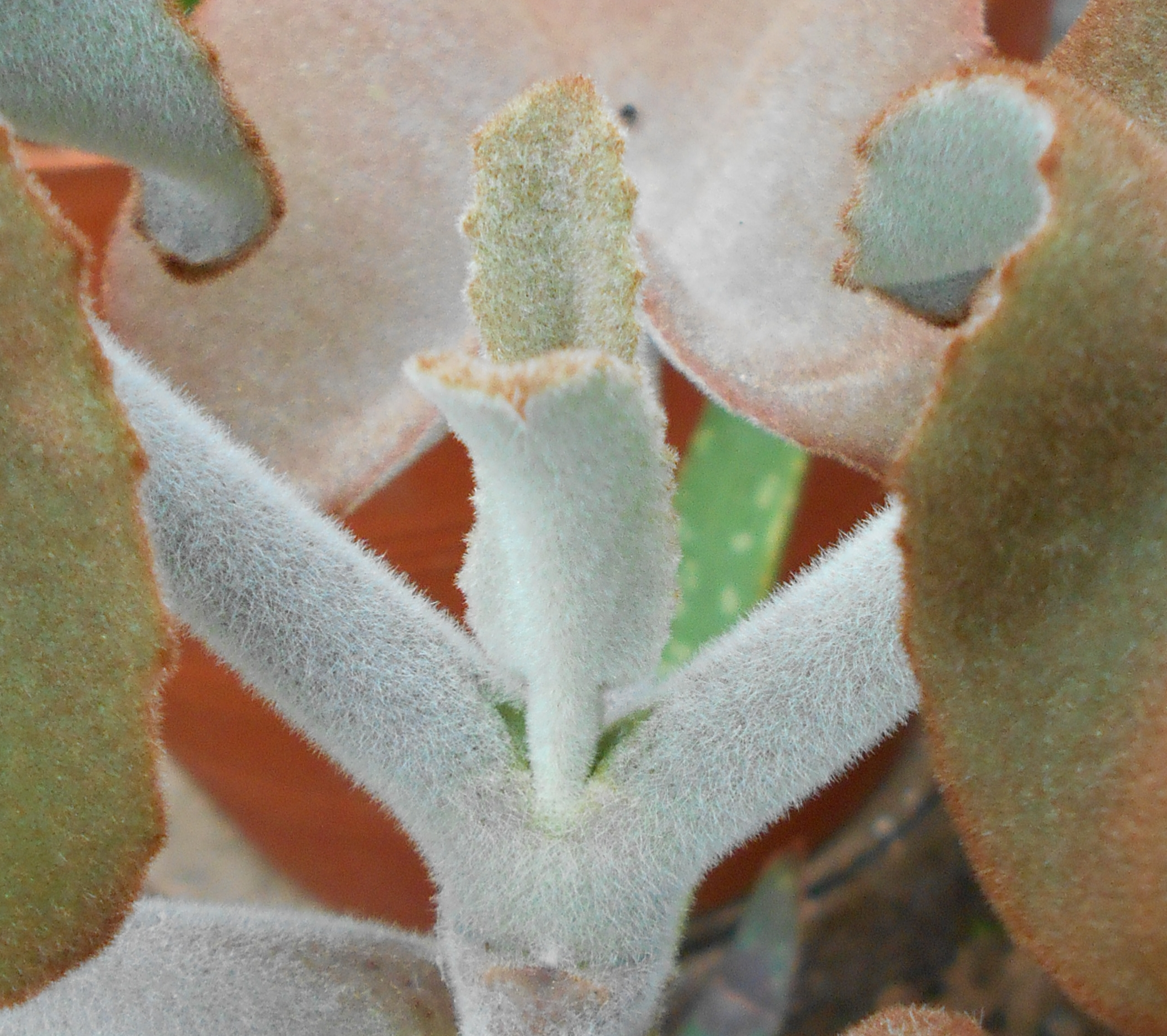

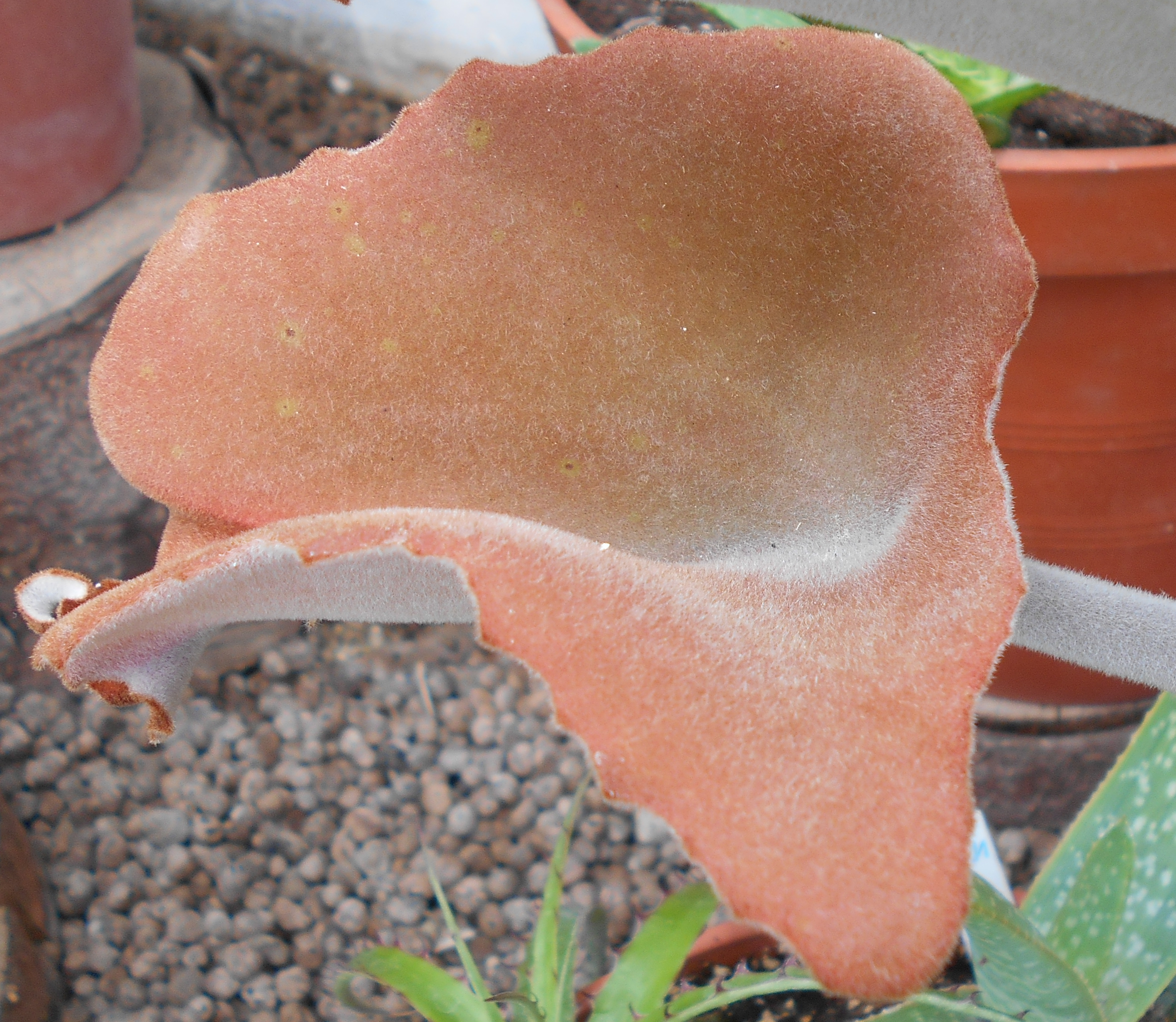

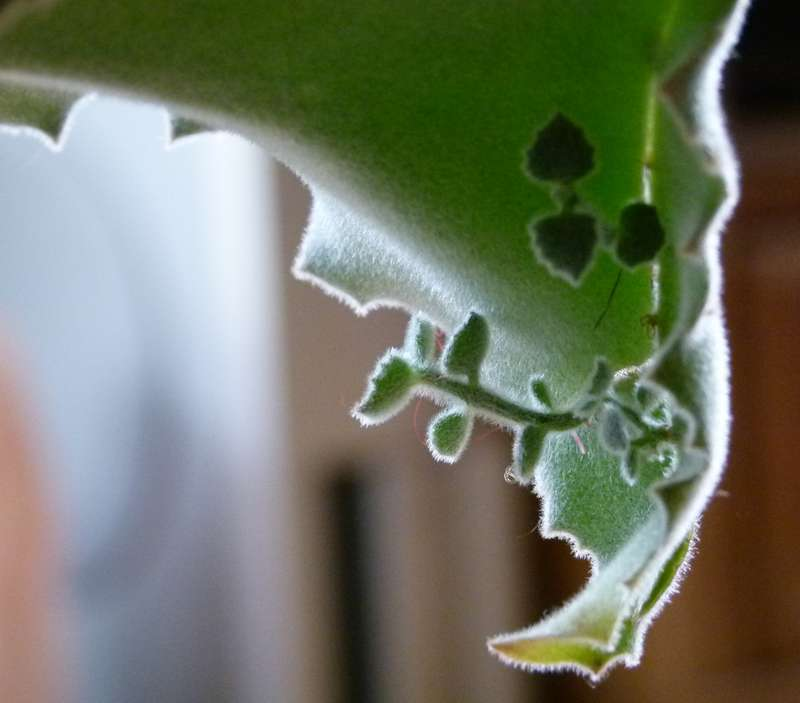

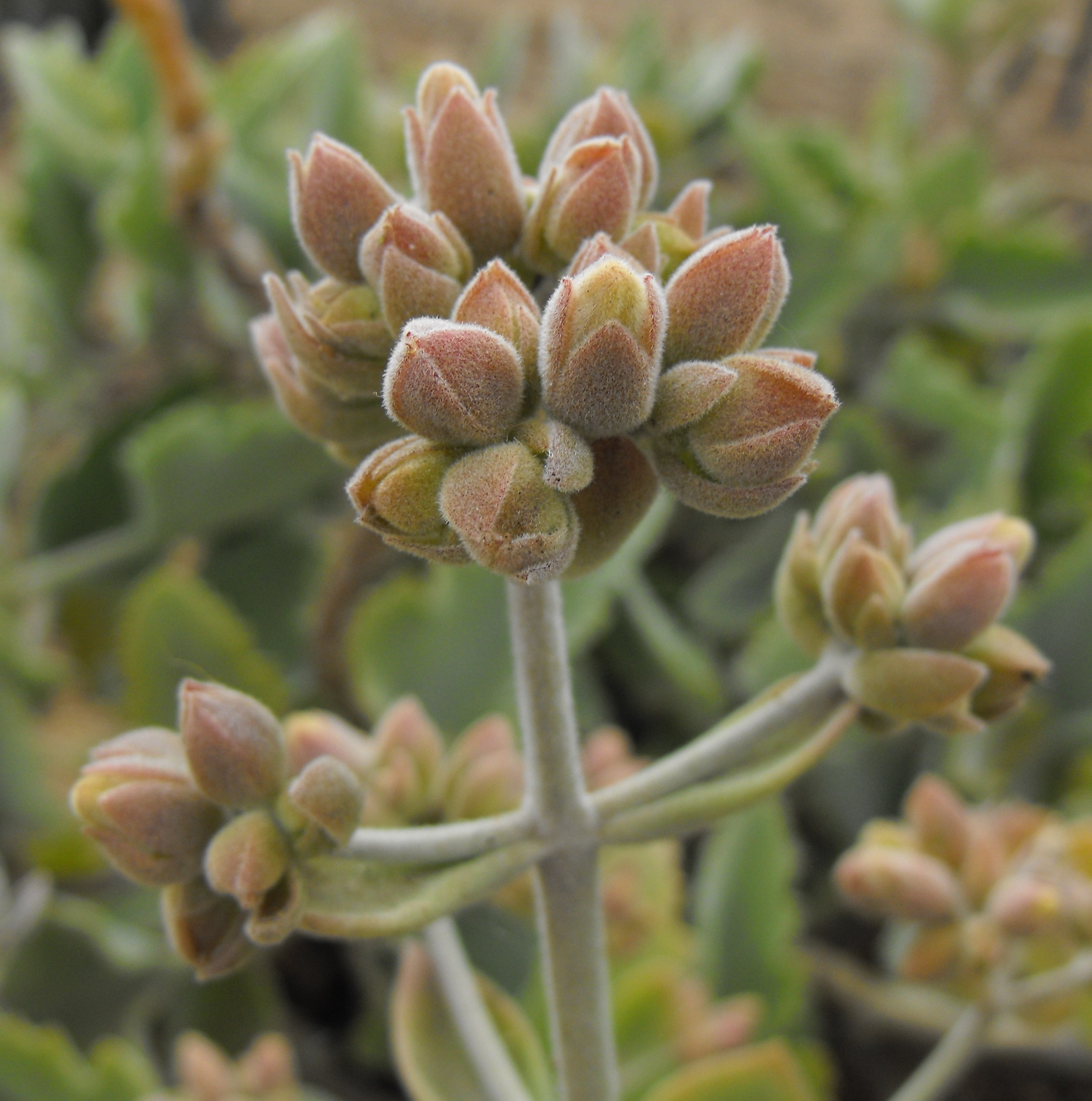

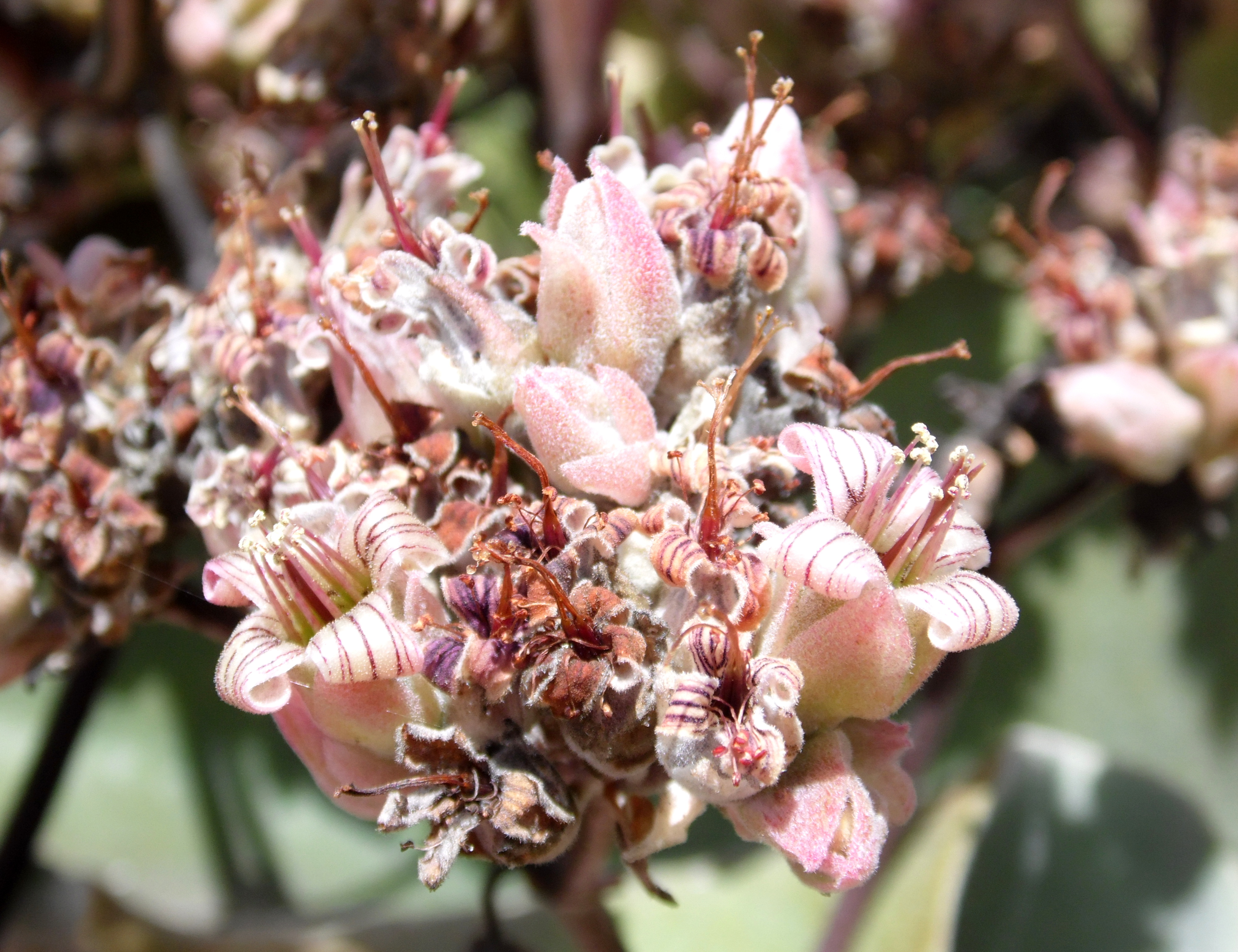
