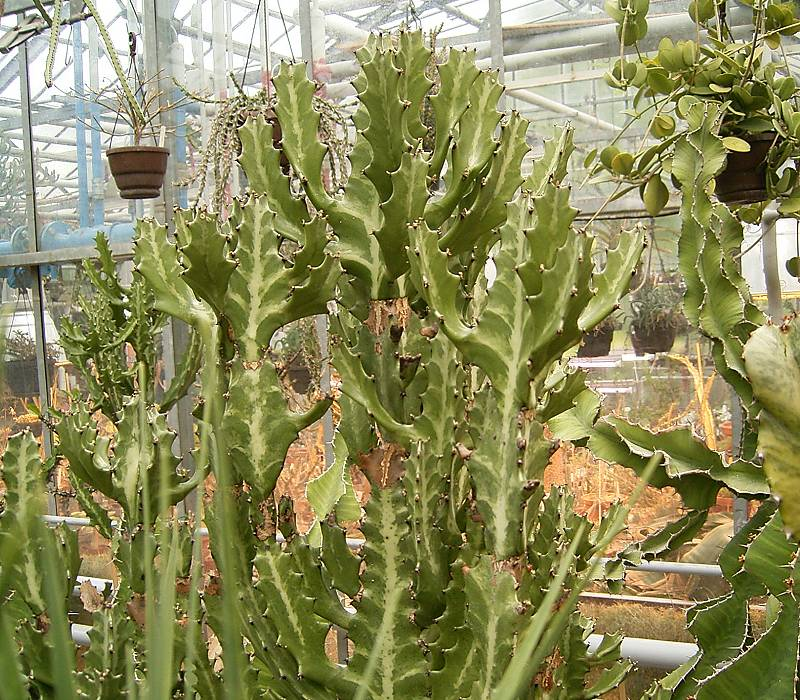

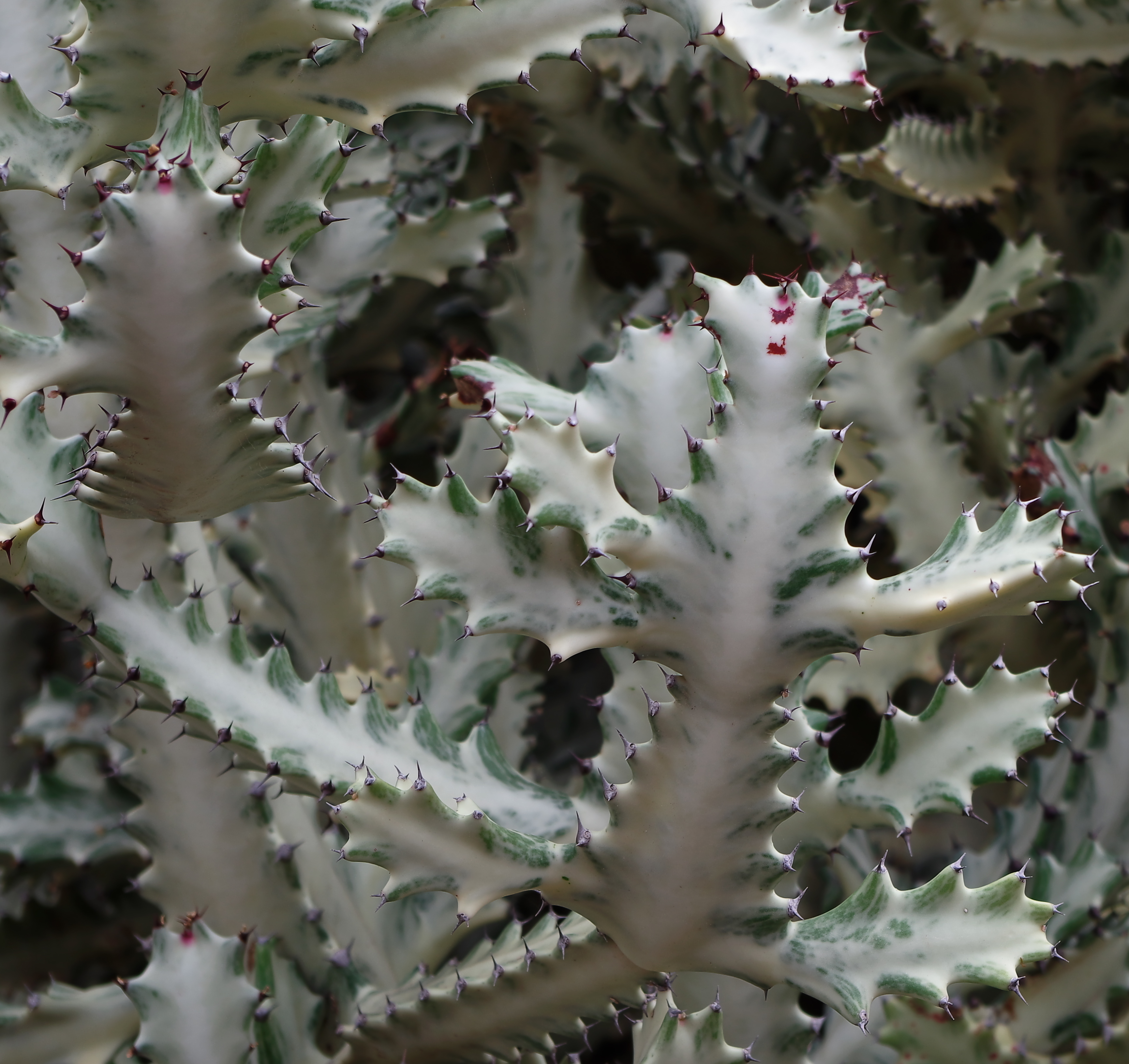
- Variegated form, Euphorbia lactea 'White Ghost' (below)

Conservation status
- Data Deficient (IUCN 3.1)
- CITES Appendix II

Scientific classification
- Kingdom: Plantae
- Clade: Tracheophytes
- Clade: Angiosperms
- Clade: Eudicots
- Clade: Rosids
- Order: Malpighiales
- Family: Euphorbiaceae
- Genus: Euphorbia
- Species: E. lactea

Binomial name
- Euphorbia lactea Haw.

= Euphorbia lactea =

Species of flowering plant

Euphorbia lactea is a species of spurge native to arid and subtropical regions of South Asia, mainly the Indian Subcontinent. Common names include mottled spurge, frilled fan, elkhorn, candelabra spurge, candelabrum tree, candelabra cactus, candelabra plant, dragon bones, false cactus, hatrack cactus, milkstripe euphorbia, mottled candlestick.

== Description ==
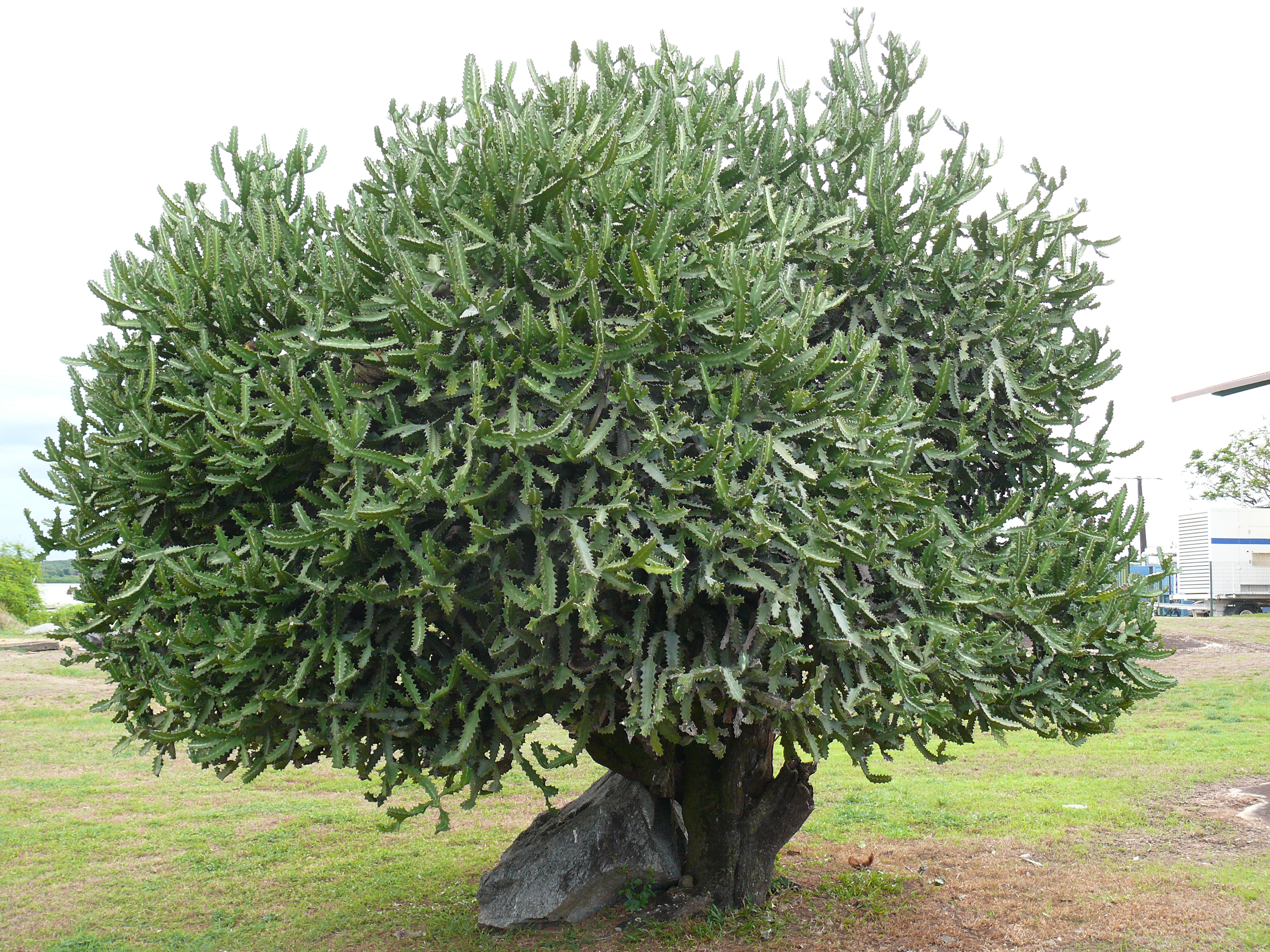
Euphorbia lactea in Kourou, French Guiana.

It is an erect shrub growing up to 5 metres (16 ft) tall, with succulent branches 3–5 centimetres (1.2–2.0 in) diameter, ridged, with a triangular or rhombic cross-section; the ridges are spiny, with short, permanent spines up to 5 millimetres (0.20 in) long. The leaves are small, and quickly deciduous.

All parts of the plant contain a poisonous milky latex, containing several irritating alkaloids, such as phorbol.

== Cultivation ==
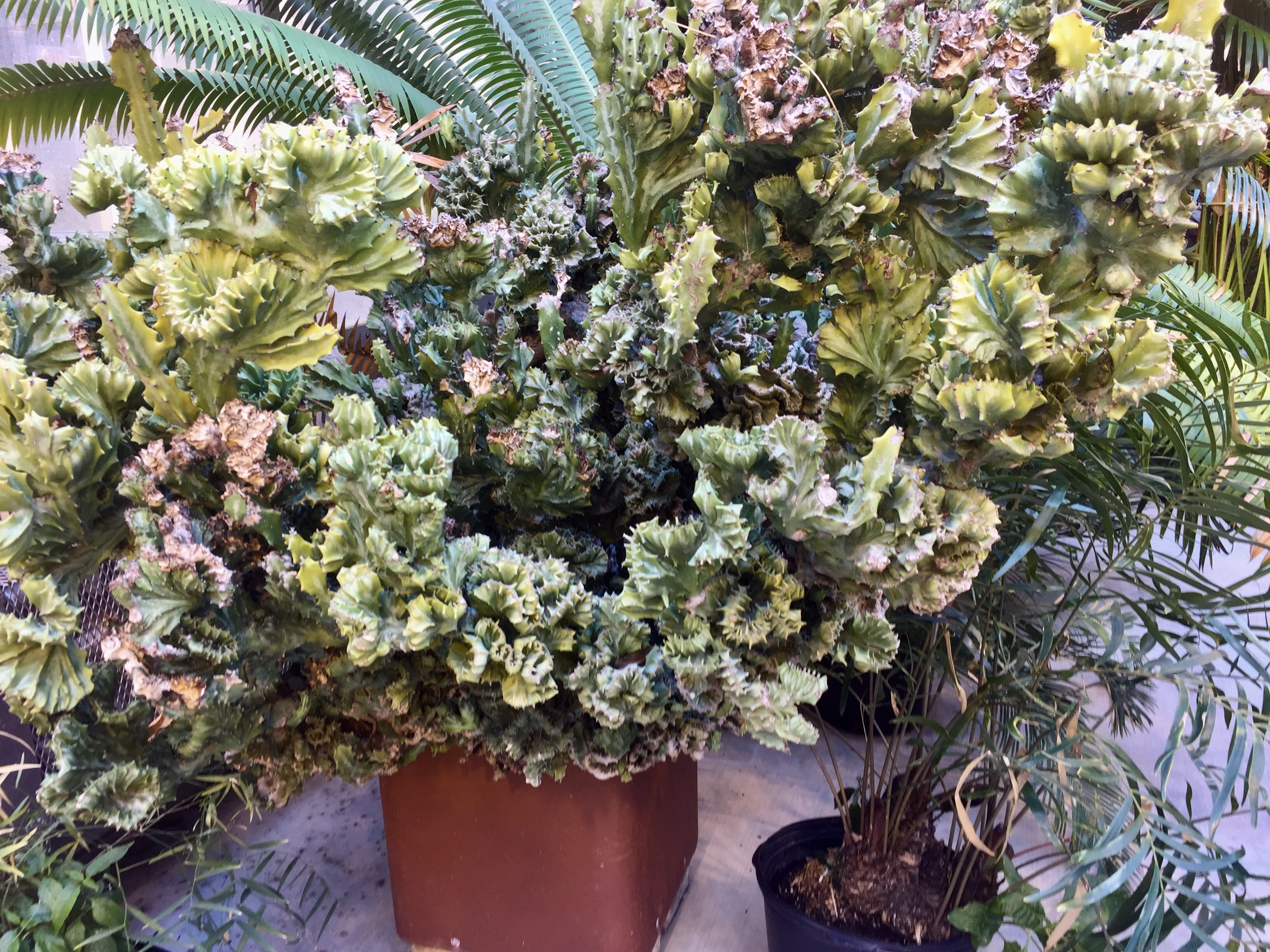
60 year old Euphorbia lactea var. Cristata located at the Duke University greenhouse, Durham, USA.

It is used medicinally in India. It is widely grown as an ornamental plant, both in the tropics, and as a houseplant in temperate regions; a number of cultivars have been selected for ornamental use, notably 'Cristata' with frilled branching.
