= Bronte Beach =

Locality in Sydney, New South Wales

Coordinates: 33°54′13″S 151°16′06″E

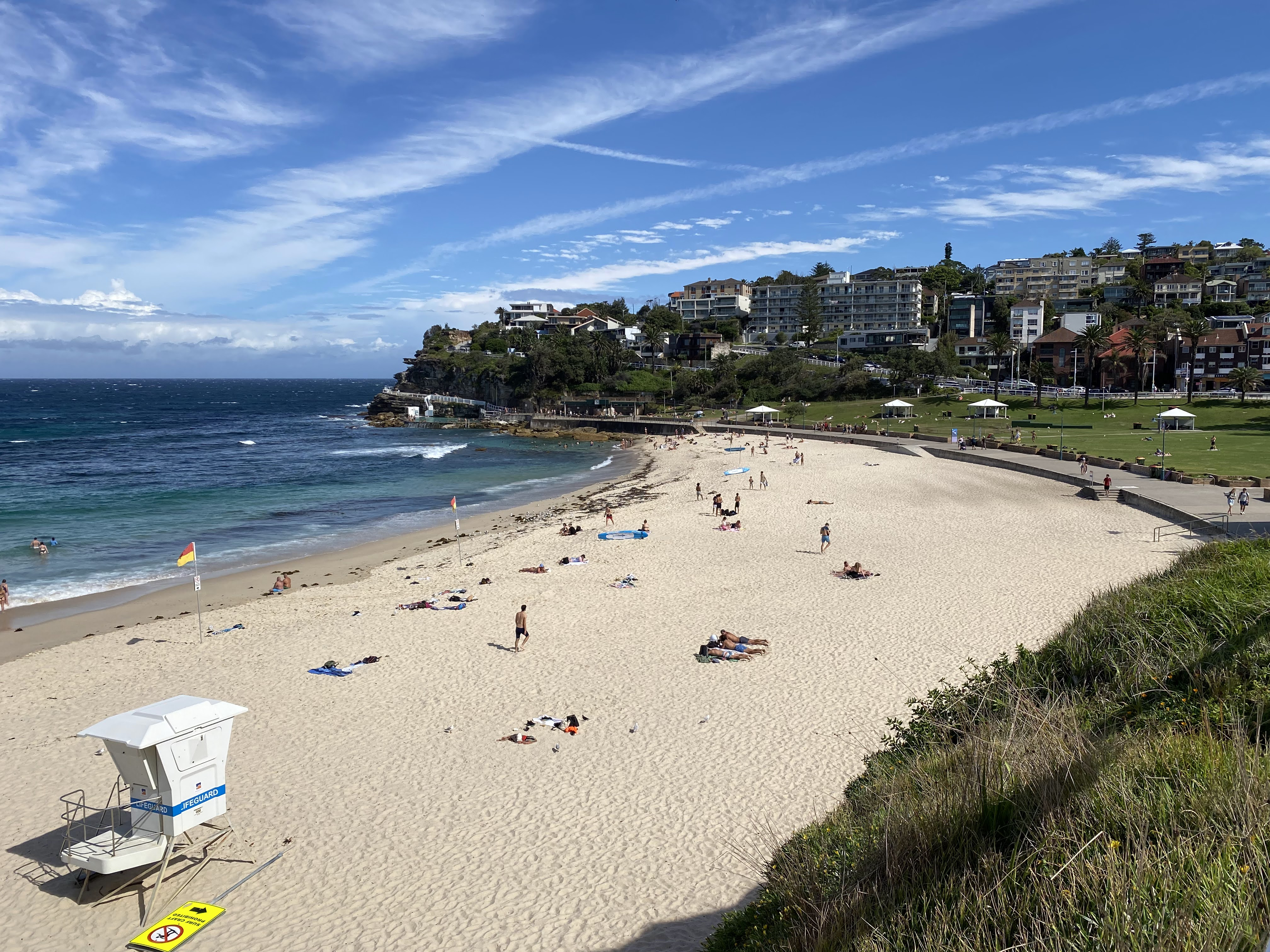
Bronte Beach in 2023

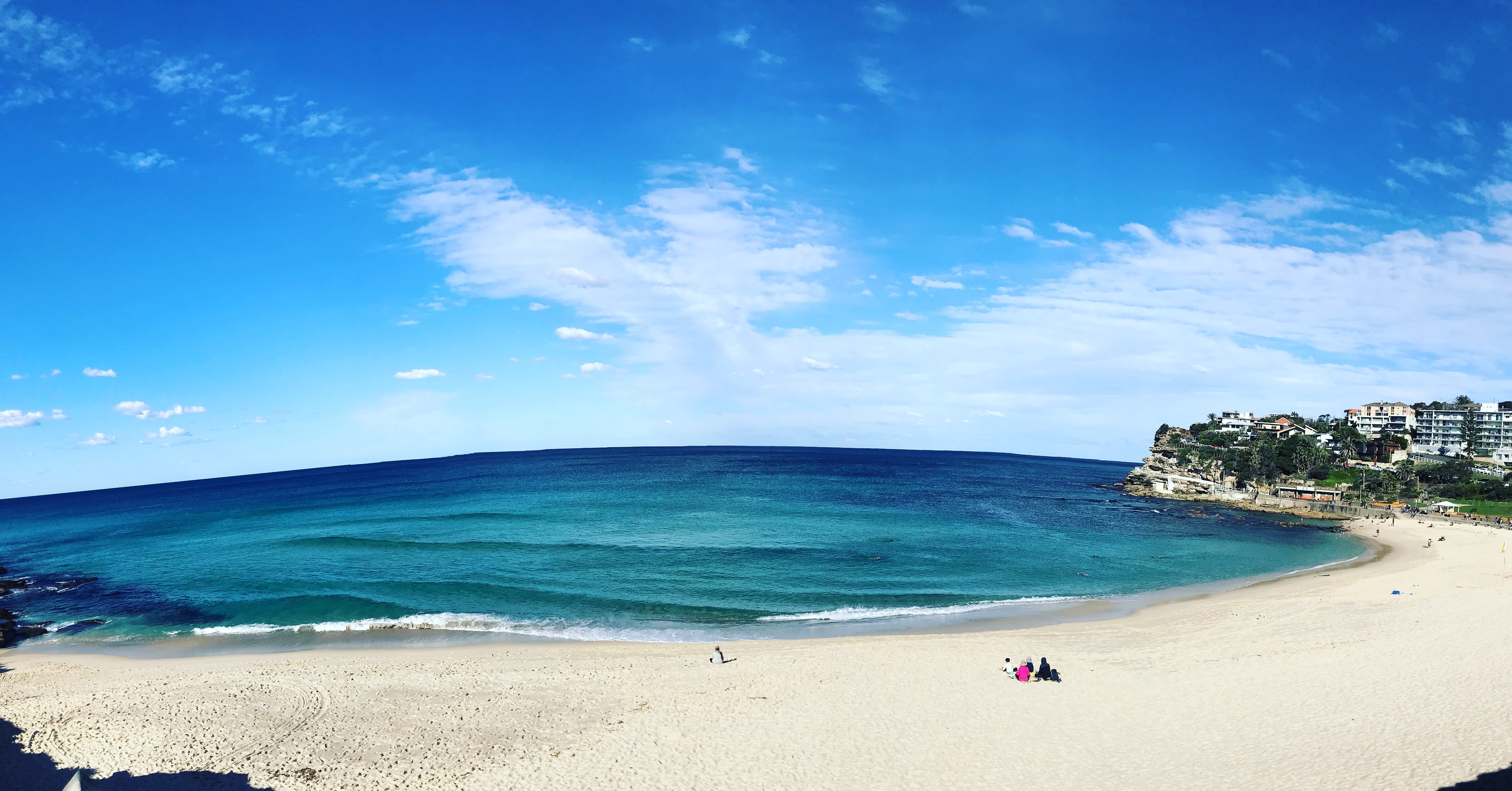
Bronte Beach in June 2018

View of Bronte Beach

Bronte Beach is a small but popular recreational beach in the Eastern Suburbs of Sydney, Australia. It is a division of the LGA of Waverley Council. Bronte Beach is 2 kilometres south of Bondi Beach and north of the much larger Coogee Beach.

A long-distance ocean swimming event is held every December between Bondi Beach and Bronte. The three beaches are linked by a paved coastal footpath along the rocky cliff tops, much frequented by tourists and local runners and walkers. The beach is popular with surfers, and despite the non-rough surf, less able swimmers can avail themselves of the bogey hole or rock pool towards the southern end of the beach. At the south end of the beach is a 30-metre ocean pool, one of the best known in Sydney. Also, directly opposite Bronte, there are some popular cafes.

== History ==
The size of the sandy area of the beach is far less than it was before 1914, when a promenade and sea wall were constructed. A functional storm water drain emptying near the bogey hole was built in 1918. During heavy wave conditions in 1961, six children swimming in the bogey hole were washed back into the pipes. All six were safely rescued by Waverley Council Life Guards and Bronte lifesavers who had to crawl up into the pipes following the two branches. On the Northern end, near a stairway, there is a naturally formed, large sandstone cave. This shady, sheltered cave may have been used by the local indigenous people.

=== Naming of Bronte Beach ===
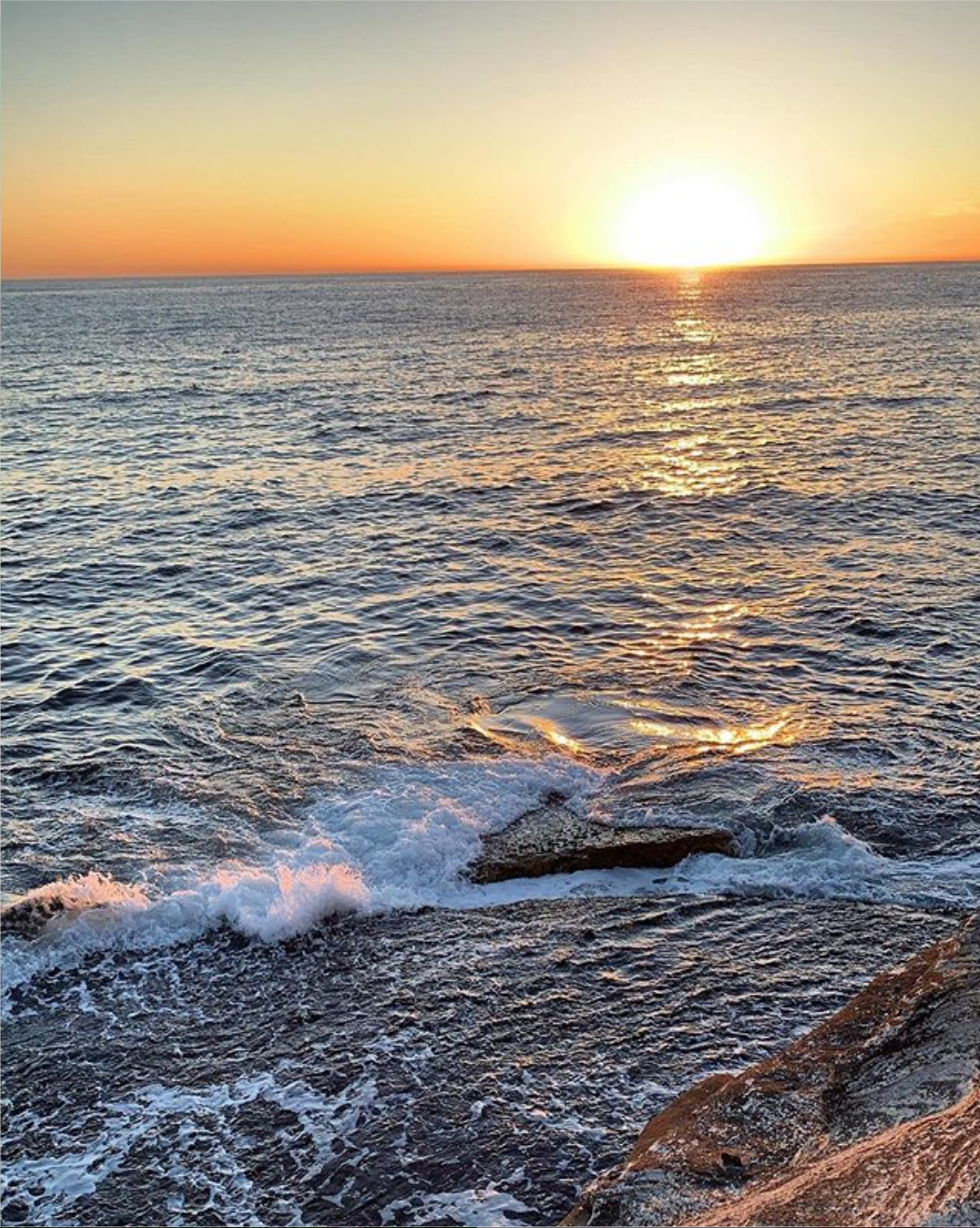
Image of Bronte Beach at sunrise

Contrary to the popular misconception that Bronte Beach was named after the Brontë sisters, or Bronte House, Bronte Beach was in fact named after the British military figure Vice-Admiral Horatio Nelson, Duke of Bronté.

In 1799, King Ferdinand III of Sicily awarded the title of Duke of Bronte to Horatio Nelson, who from that time signed his name as "Nelson and Bronte". Originally, Bronte Beach was known as "Nelson Bay" and continues as the name of the bay fronting the beach. There are other references to Vice-Admiral Horatio Nelson, Duke of Bronte, in the area, specifically the naming of Trafalgar Street, Nelson Avenue, and Bronte Road. In 1957, the name "Bronte" for the suburb was first used in advertisements for the sale of land known as the Bronte Estate.

== Surfing ==
There is a very dangerous rip at Bronte Beach known as the Bronte Express.

The beach is patrolled by Waverley Council full-time lifeguards daily (except during winter) and volunteer lifesavers from the life saving club on weekends and public holidays.

It is home to Bronte Surf Lifesaving Club and is the oldest such organisation in the world, having been formed in 1903.

A public park adjoins the beach, with provision of picnic seats and barbecue hotplates, although parking is limited and restrictions are strictly enforced. The beach is served by the 379 bus from Bondi Junction station. The beach is shaded by hills to the west and tends to become cool, windy, and deserted towards the end of the afternoon.

== Notable people ==
- Jessi Miley-Dyer, surfer
