= Syd Einfeld Drive =

Road in Sydney, Australia

Syd Einfeld Drive New South Wales
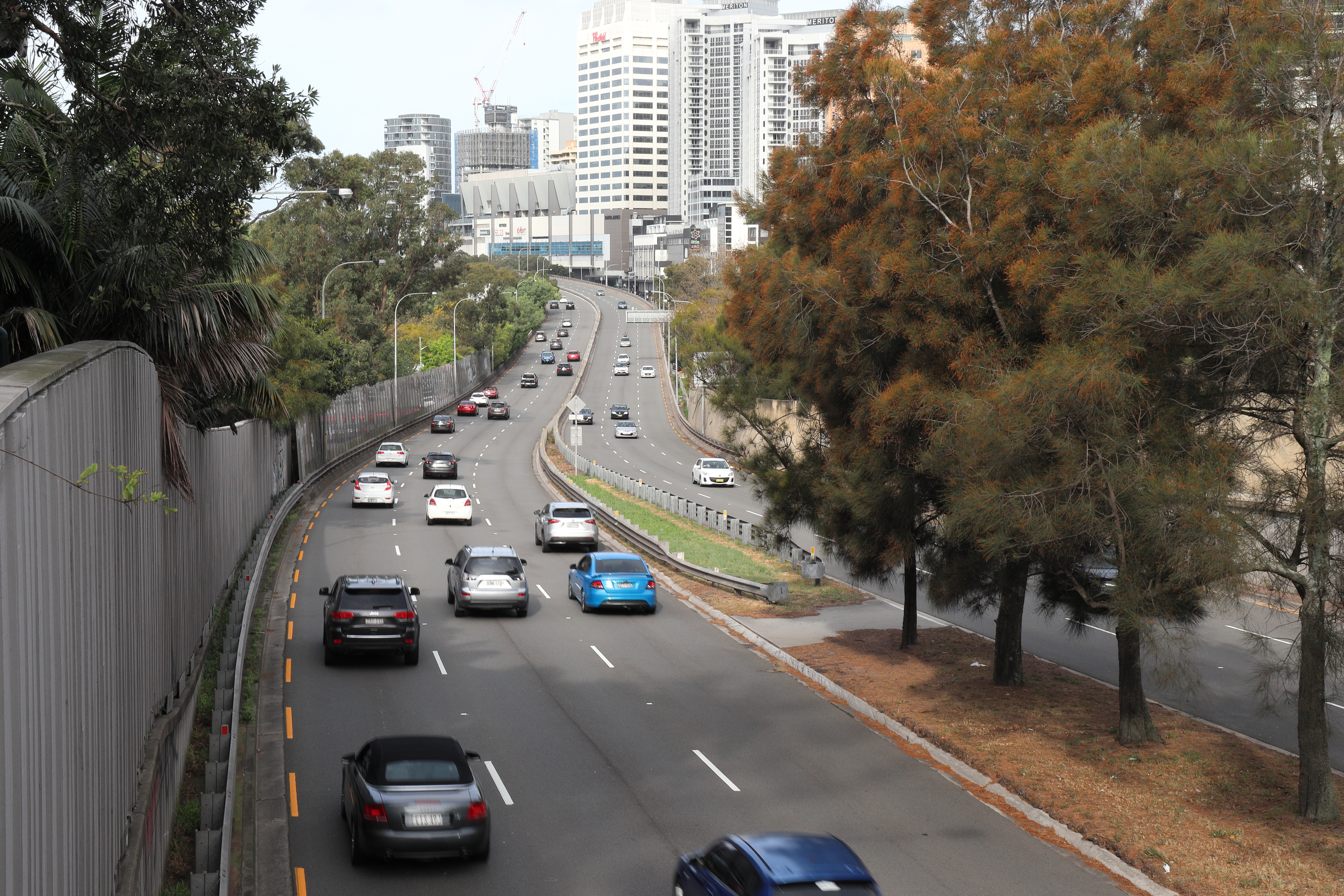
- Looking east just past the York Road intersection
- Coordinates: 33.889898°S 151.240557°E (West end); 33.891010°S 151.253358°E (East end)

General information
- Type: Road
- Length: 1.2 km (0.7 mi)

Major junctions
- West end: Oxford Street; Woollahra, Sydney
- East end: Bondi Road; Bondi Junction, Sydney

Syd Einfeld Drive, formerly the Bondi Junction Bypass, is a partially elevated dual carriageway in Sydney, Australia. It was built to bypass a section of Oxford Street through Bondi Junction.

== Route ==
Syd Einfeld Drive commences at the intersection of Oxford Street and Ocean Street in Woollahra and heads east as a six-lane, dual-carriageway road, elevated for most of its length over connector roads into central Bondi Junction just to its south. It terminates at the intersection Oxford Street, Old South Head Road and Bondi Road at the eastern end of Bondi Junction. It has a speed limit of 80 km/h (50 mph) for its entire length.

== History ==
The decision to go ahead with the bypass was not made until late 1976, meaning the project only had just over two years to be built in time for the scheduled opening of the bus and rail interchange in early 1979. Construction commenced in February 1977, with the road opened as the Bondi Junction Bypass on 9 January 1979 by local member of parliament Syd Einfeld. Construction of the road included 26 span prestressed concrete viaduct at Bondi Junction, totalling 456.6 metres (1,498 ft) in length.

The passing of the Main Roads Act of 1924 through the Parliament of New South Wales provided for the declaration of Main Roads, roads partially funded by the State government through the Main Roads Board (MRB). With the subsequent passing of the Main Roads (Amendment) Act of 1929 to provide for additional declarations of State Highways and Trunk Roads, the Department of Main Roads, having succeeded the MRB in 1932, re-aligned Main Road 172 from its old route along Oxford Street through Bondi Junction to the bypass road not long after it opened.

It was renamed Syd Einfeld Drive in February 1988. On 10 March 1989, a baby boy was born in an ambulance stopped on the road.

The County of Cumberland planning scheme had envisaged a freeway being built from the Sydney central business district to Bondi Junction. However, this was the only section of the road completed, being built in conjunction with the Eastern Suburbs railway line and Bondi Junction railway station.

The passing of the Roads Act of 1993 updated road classifications and the way they could be declared within New South Wales. Under this act, Syd Einfeld Drive retains its declaration as part of Main Road 172.

== Major intersections ==
LGA	Location	km	mi	Destinations	Notes
Sydney–Woollahra boundary	Woollahra–Centennial Park boundary	0.0	0.0	Oxford Street (west) – Darlinghurst	Western end of road
Sydney–Woollahra boundary	Woollahra–Centennial Park boundary	0.0	0.0	Ocean Street (north) – Woollahra; Wallis Street (one-way eastbound) – Woollahra; Oxford Street (one-way westbound) – Bondi Junction	Eastbound exit from and westbound entrance to Wallis Street only Westbound entrance from Oxford Street only
Woollahra–Waverley boundary	Centennial Park–Bondi Junction boundary	0.1	0.062	York Road – Queens Park	No right turn northbound into Syd Einfeld Drive
Woollahra–Waverley boundary	Bondi Junction–Woollahra boundary	1.2	0.75	Oxford Street (west) – Bondi Junction; Old South Head Road (northeast) – Vaucluse, Watsons Bay	
Woollahra–Waverley boundary	Bondi Junction–Woollahra boundary	1.2	0.75	Bondi Road (southeast) – Bondi	Eastern terminus of road
Incomplete access; Route transition
