= Oxford Street, Sydney =

Road in Sydney, Australia

Oxford Street, Sydney New South Wales
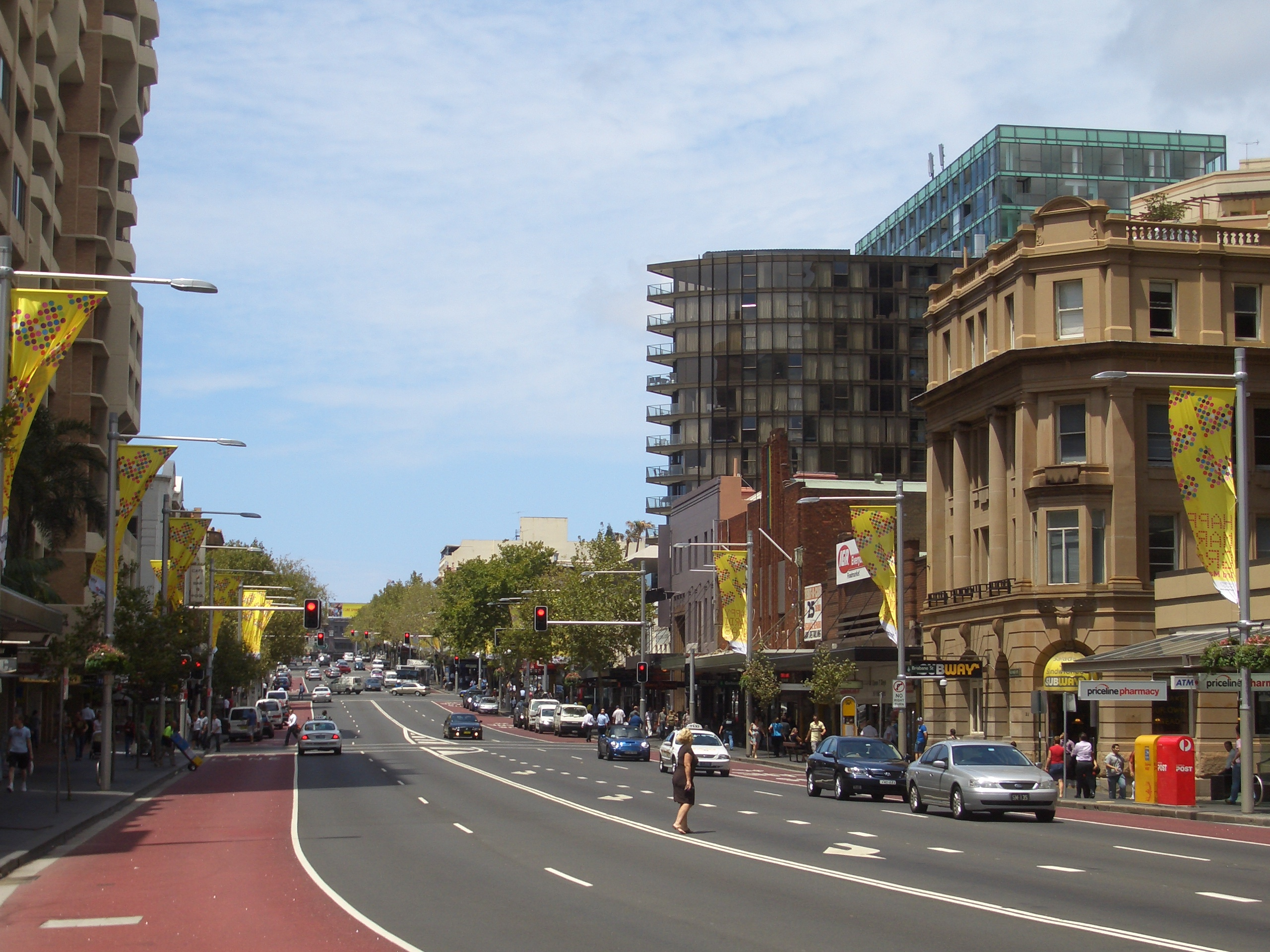
- Darlinghurst, 2007
- Coordinates: 33.870901°S 151.203876°E (Western end); 33.891012°S 151.253362°E (Eastern end)

General information
- Type: Street
- Length: 4.5 km (2.8 mi)
- Gazetted: August 1928

Major junctions
- Western end: Liverpool Street; Darlinghurst, Sydney
- College Street; Crown Street; Flinders Street; South Dowling Street; Moore Park Road; Syd Einfeld Drive; Bondi Road
- Eastern end: Old South Head Road; Bondi Junction, Sydney

Location(s)
- Major suburbs: Paddington, Woollahra

Oxford Street is a major thoroughfare in Sydney, New South Wales, Australia, running from the south-east border of the Sydney central business district to Bondi Junction in the Eastern Suburbs. Close to the CBD in particular, the street is lined with numerous shops, bars and nightclubs. After the 1980s, Oxford Street garnered a reputation as Sydney's primary nightclub strip (firstly gay nightclubs in the 1980s followed by straight nightclubs in the 2000s) and subsequently saw a large increase in the number of crimes committed in the area. However, the 2014 lockout laws saw many nightclubs close and the crime rate drop as Sydney's nightlife hubs moved to Darling Harbour and Newtown. The lockout laws ended in 2020 with a focus on small bars and restaurants. Many nightclubs reopened after 2021 especially around Taylor Square. Oxford street hosted World Pride in 2023. In May 2025, developer TOGA said the first tenants were set to begin moving into the Oxford & Foley precinct the following month.

The western section of Oxford Street, which runs through the suburb of Darlinghurst, is widely recognised as Sydney's main gay district and Oxford Street is closed to traffic once a year in early March for the Sydney Gay and Lesbian Mardi Gras. Specifically, the area of Oxford Street between Hyde Park and Paddington Town Hall became known from the early 1980s as 'The Golden Mile' because of the growing density of popular venues for the gay community. The section to the east of Taylor Square, running through the suburb of Paddington forms an upmarket shopping strip and represents the home of the new medical faculty of the University of Notre Dame Australia as well as the University of New South Wales' College of Fine Arts, Victoria Barracks, Paddington Bazaar and St Vincent's Hospital, Sydney amongst other locations.

== Route ==
Oxford Street starts at Whitlam Square on the south-east corner of Hyde Park at the intersection of Liverpool Street, College Street and Wentworth Avenue on the south-eastern fringe of central Sydney and heads in a south-easterly direction as a four-lane, single-carriageway road through Darlinghurst, where it meets Bourke Street and Flinders Street at Taylor Square. It continues through Paddington, and branches off at the intersection with Syd Einfeld Drive in Woollahra to become a suburban street through Bondi Junction; a portion of it has been converted into a pedestrian mall through its commercial centre. It continues east to terminate a short distance later at the intersection of Old South Head Road, Syd Einfeld Drive and Bondi Road in eastern Bondi Junction.

== History ==
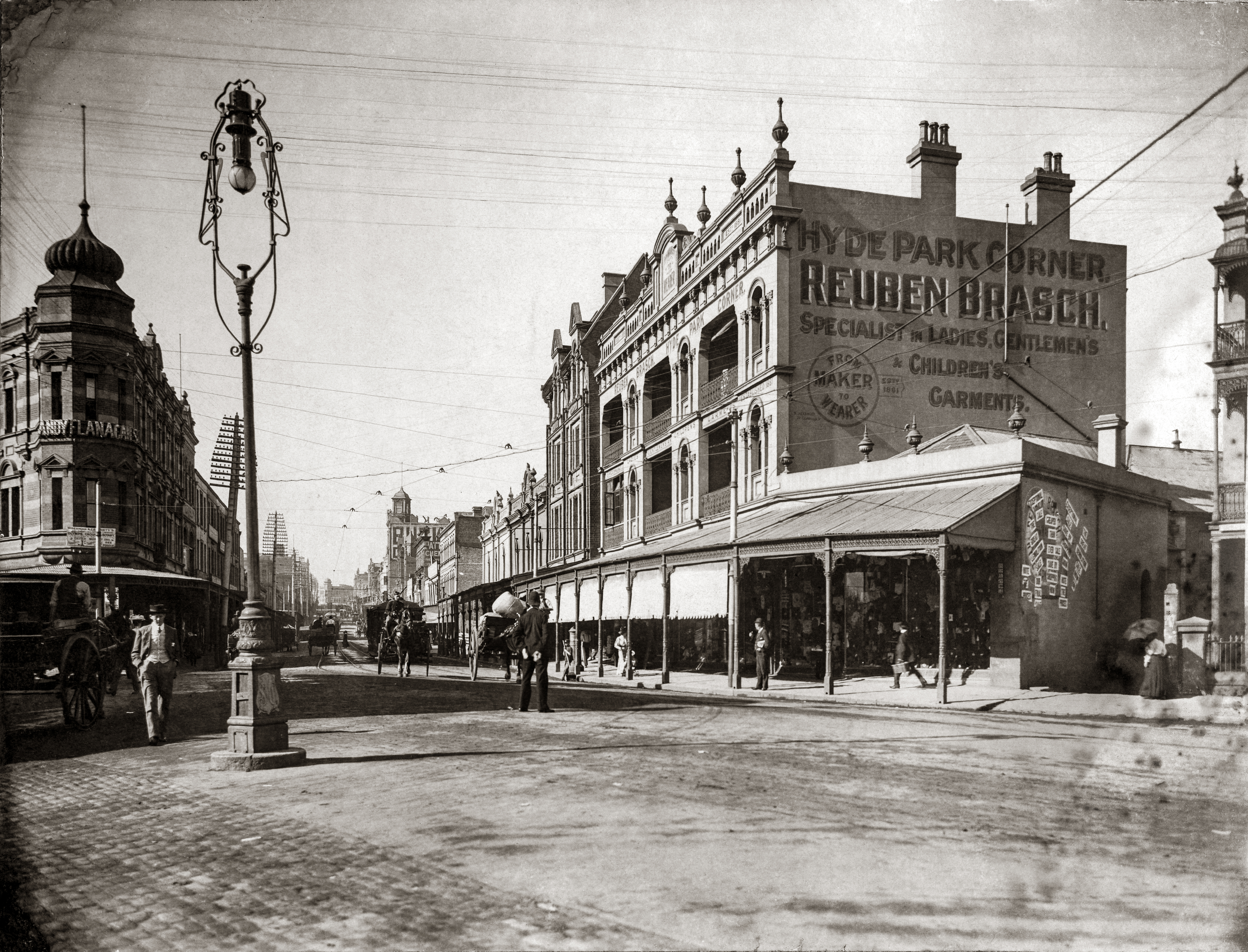
Looking up Oxford Street, Sydney from Hyde Park Corner, 1910

In May 1909 the Sydney Council resolved to widen Oxford Street from 66 feet (20 m) to 100 feet (30 m) by resuming the entire north side of the street between Liverpool and Bourke Streets. The project was carried out in five stages between 1910 and 1914. The result was a new boulevard and the creation of a Federation streetscape which remains today largely intact.

Trams to Bondi and Bronte beaches travelled down Oxford Street until the line was closed in 1960, replaced by the current bus service.

=== Paddington Reservoir ===
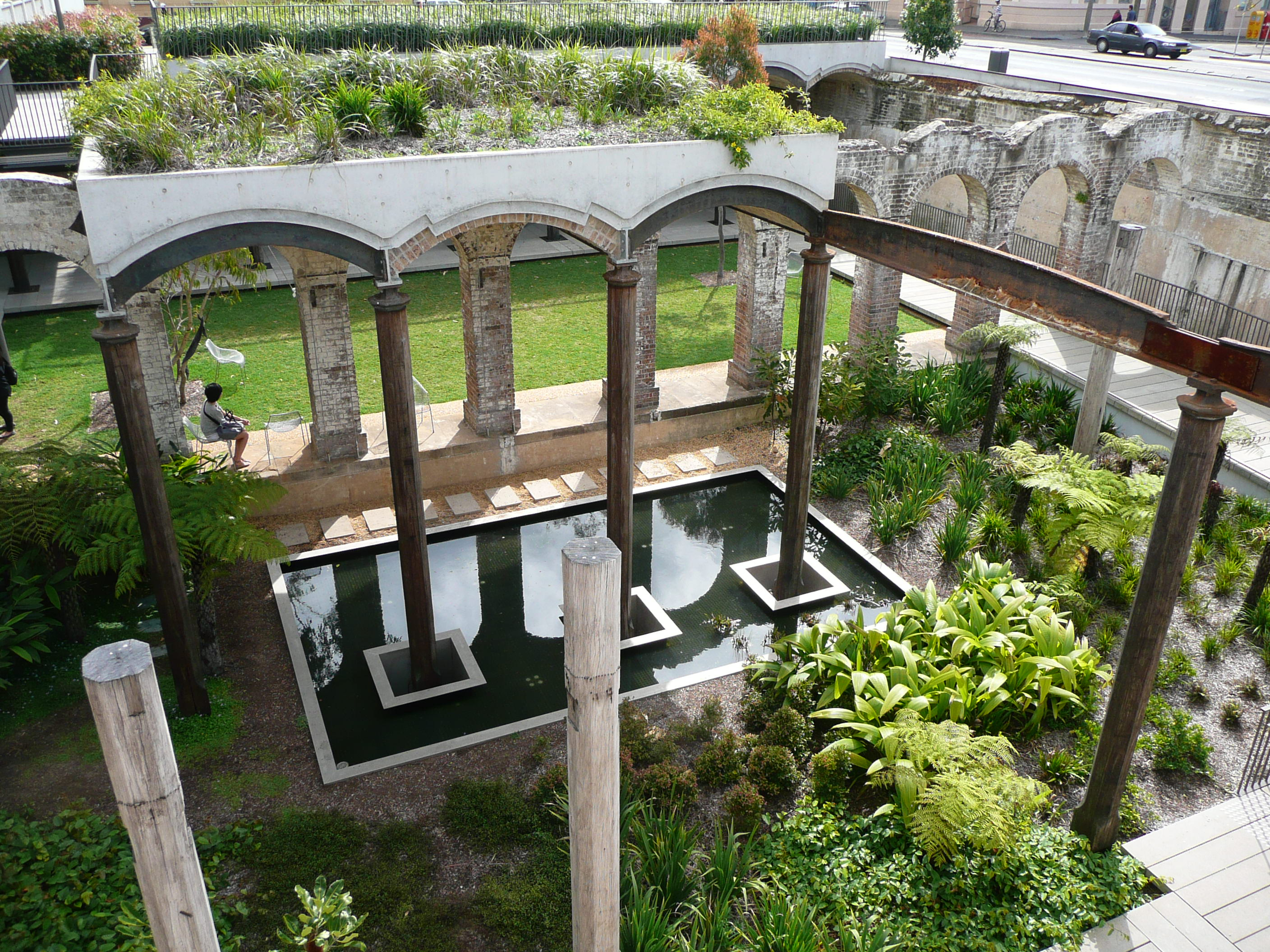
Paddington Reservoir

Located on the corner of Oatley Road and Oxford Street is the Paddington Reservoir, a water reservoir which provided water to the Botany Swamps pumping station for the provision of water to parts of Sydney between 1866 and 1899. In 2006 work began to restore and reuse the space of the then derelict Paddington Reservoir. The facility reopened in 2008 as a sunken garden known as the Paddington Reservoir Gardens or Walter Read Reserve, with a rooftop reserve located above the preserved eastern chamber. The facility integrates the remains of the original brick, timber and iron structure with modern elements of sculptural, structural and functional significance which provide access to the sunken garden via stairs and an elevator as well as ramped access to the rooftop reserve.

=== Victoria Barracks ===
Victoria Barracks, located in Oxford Street, houses the Headquarters Forces Command (Australia), as well as the Army Museum of NSW which is housed in the original District Military Prison, constructed in 1800. The barracks was constructed of Hawkesbury sandstone by way of convict labour between 1841 and 1846. The Barracks were originally occupied by regiments of the British Army who vacated the site in 1870. The Barracks was the premier military training site in Australia until 1901. For a brief period during the 1930s Victoria Barracks was home to the Royal Military College, Duntroon when the College was forced to close its buildings in Canberra and relocate to Sydney due to the economic downturn caused by the Great Depression.

=== Road classification ===
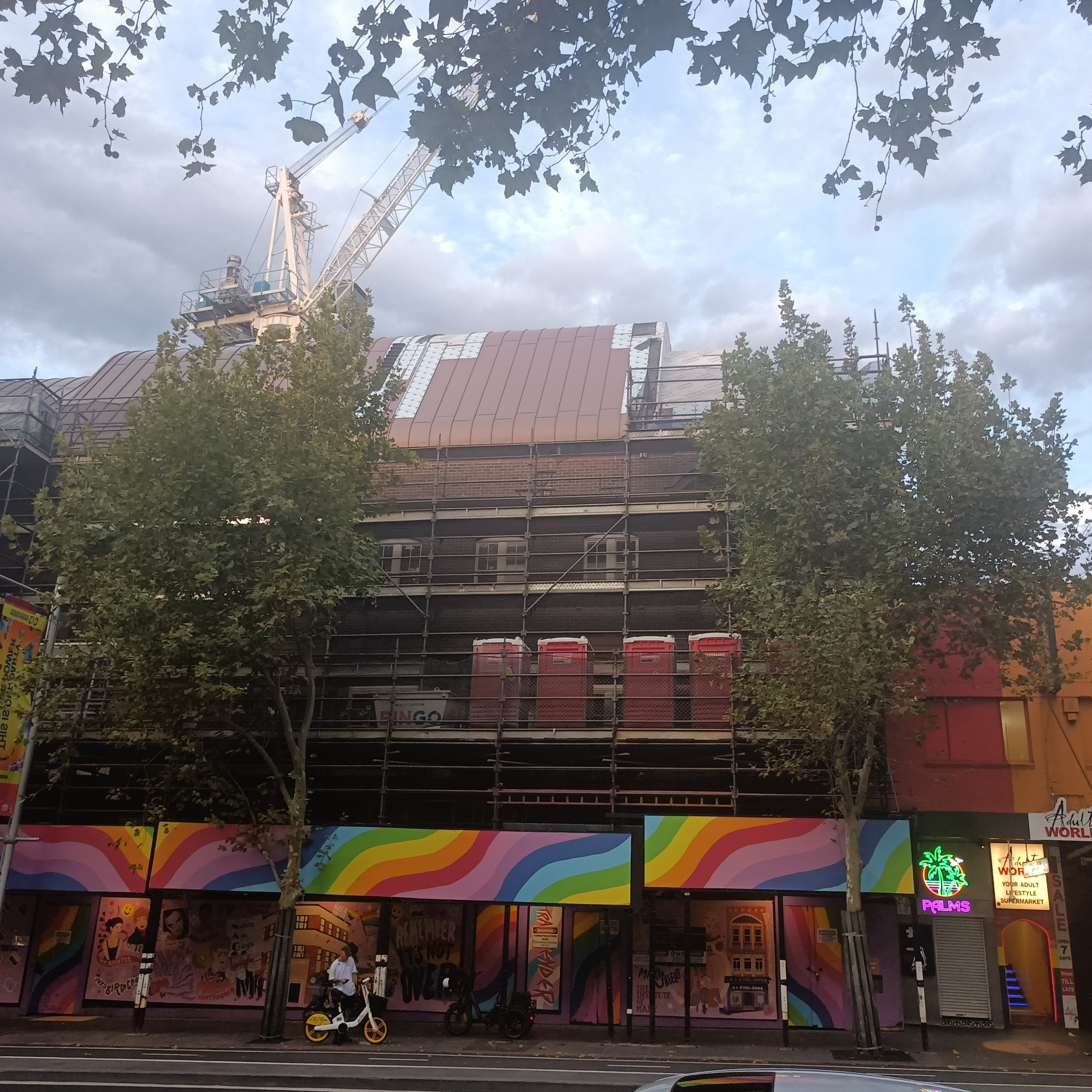
Construction hoardings along Oxford street installed in December 2022 in time for World Pride 2023 that was held in Sydney. The hoardings ran down the Darlinghurst section of Oxford street alongside the parade route of the Sydney Gay and Lesbian Mardi Gras parade. Darlinghurst. 2026

The passing of the Main Roads Act of 1924 through the Parliament of New South Wales provided for the declaration of Main Roads, roads partially funded by the State government through the Main Roads Board. Main Road No. 172 was declared along this road on 8 August 1928, from the boundary with the City of Sydney to Bondi Junction (and continuing east along Bondi Road to Bondi); with the passing of the Main Roads (Amendment) Act of 1929 to provide for additional declarations of State Highways and Trunk Roads, this was amended to Main Road 172 on 8 April 1929. Its western end was altered to commence at Taylor Square on 2 December 1964, re-aligned along the Bondi Junction Bypass (later named Syd Einfeld Drive when it opened in 1979), then moved closer to the city to start at the intersection with Crown Street on 25 July 1997.

The passing of the Roads Act of 1993 updated road classifications and the way they could be declared within New South Wales. Under this act, Oxford Street retains its declaration as part of Main Road 172.

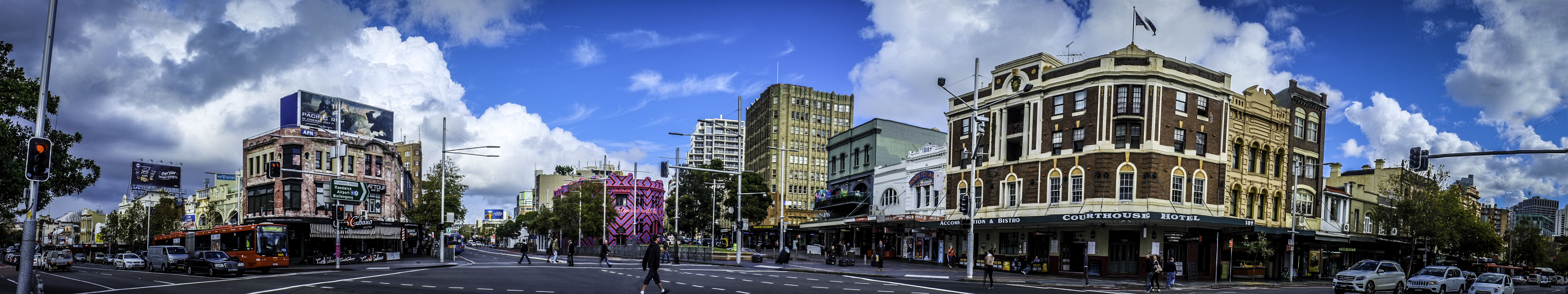
Taylor Square intersection, corner of Oxford street and Flinders Street Darlinghurst. 2013

== Heritage buildings ==
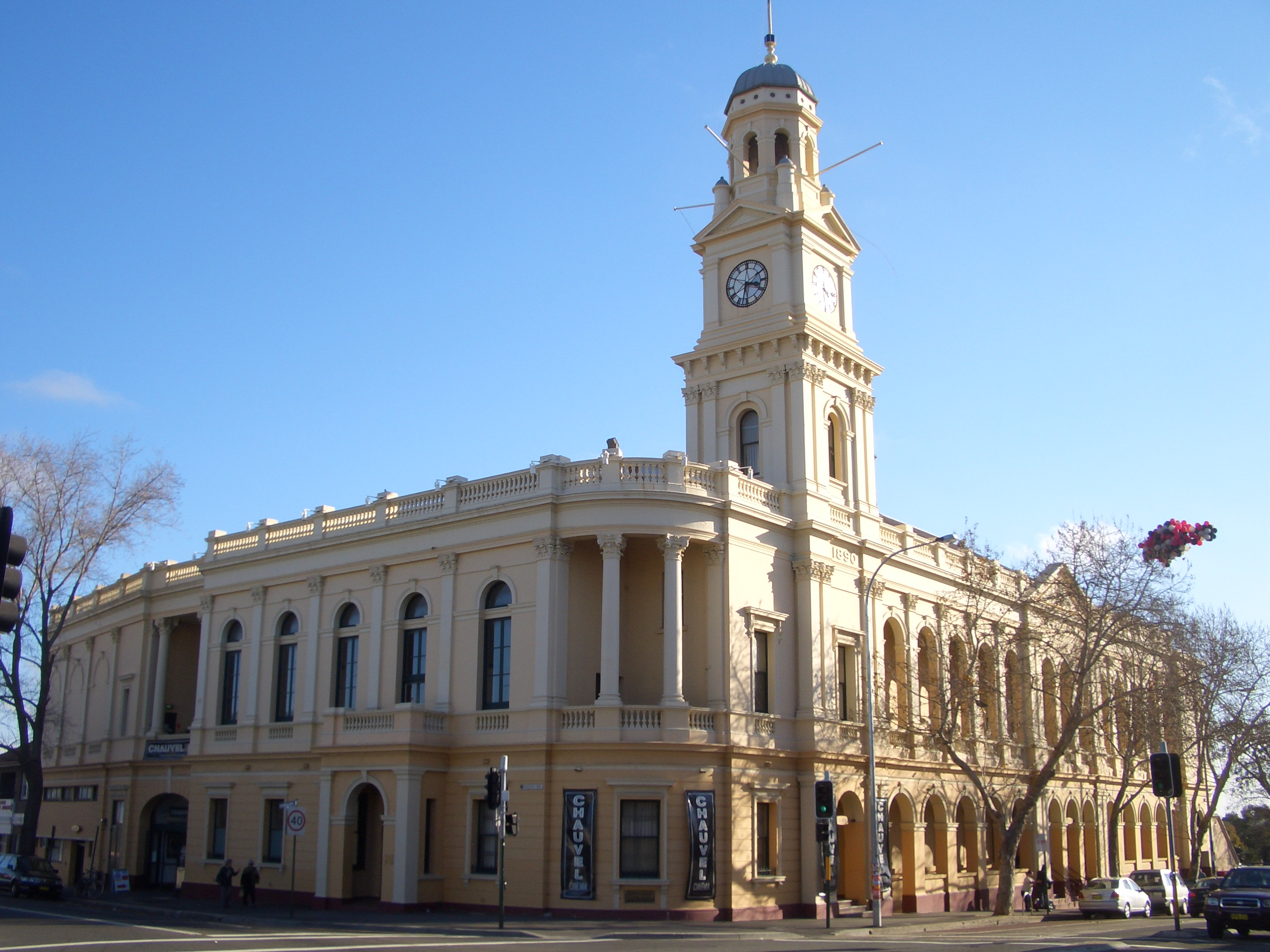
Paddington Hall

The following buildings are on the Register of the National Estate:

- Victoria Barracks (1841–48)
- Paddington Town Hall (1890–91)
- Paddington Public School (1870 and 1892 buildings)
- Uniting Church and Parsonage (1877)
- St Matthias Church Group (1859–61)
- Former St Mattias Rectory (1873)
- St Matthias Church Hall (1882)
- Post Office (1885)

== Oxford Street Mall ==
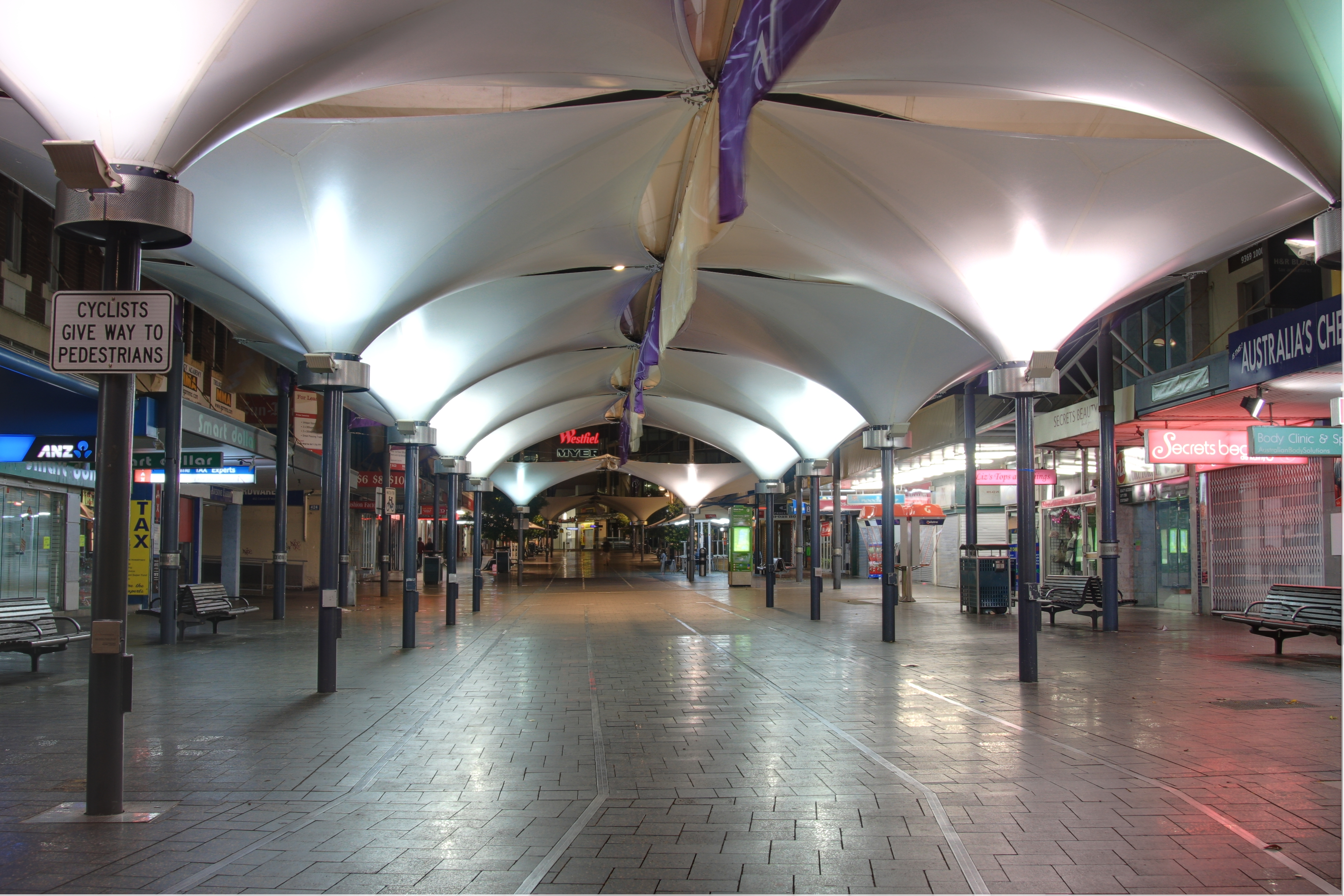
Oxford Street Mall with artificial tram tracks that have been installed to commemorate the actual tram line which passed through here prior to 1960

The pedestrian-only zone of Oxford Street between Bronte Road and Newland Street, Bondi Junction was converted into a pedestrian mall in 1979 when the Eastern Suburbs railway line opened. Prior to the 1960 trams ran along that stretch of Oxford Street. Oxford Street Mall was an alternative to shopping at the nearby shopping centres as it was once home Waltons department store, Flemings and Woolworths supermarkets and a Timezone arcade. However these stores have since disappeared prior to the 1990s.

Oxford Street Mall is home to numerous shops and cafes and is an entry to many small arcades and shopping centres that are located on this stretch including Meriton Retail Precinct Bondi Junction, Bronka Arcade and The Royal Arcade. Bondi Junction railway station can be accessed through the Meriton Retail Precinct on Rowe Street. Bronka and The Royal Arcade provides direct pedestrian passage way to Spring Street and Eastgate Bondi Junction. Westfield Bondi Junction is located on the Bronte Road end of Oxford Street Mall.

In 2003, Waverley Council upgraded the Oxford Street pedestrian mall and embarked on a general upgrade of streets and footpaths in the commercial area. The upgrade included new footpath tiles, addition of shade sails over new inground rondels and artificial 'tram tracks' along the entire mall, paving text as cast inlays and glass bead blasting into paving and as well as suspended art installations. The artificial tram tracks are the main features of the mall that commemorate the actual tram line that previously passed through.

Since 2013 there were plans for a light rail to Bondi Beach going along Oxford Street Mall. However in November 2017 Waverley Council had voted to reject any proposals for a light rail along Oxford Street or Bondi Road in favour of local businesses.

== Oxford Street Cycleway ==
After the 2023 WorldPride festival a bidirectional separated cycleway will be constructed between Taylor Square and Hyde Park on Oxford Street.

The City of Sydney announced the original design for a bidirectional centre running "pop up" cycleway in November 2020. After further consultation they announced a new design running on the north edge of the street, which was completed in 2025.

According to the City of Sydney, about 2000 people per day ride along Oxford Street amongst traffic on the six lane road.

In 2025, three residents launched legal action against the cycleway, claiming the project "breaches human rights". The complaint was widely ridiculed. A judgement was made on 20 February 2026.

== Oxford Street revival ==
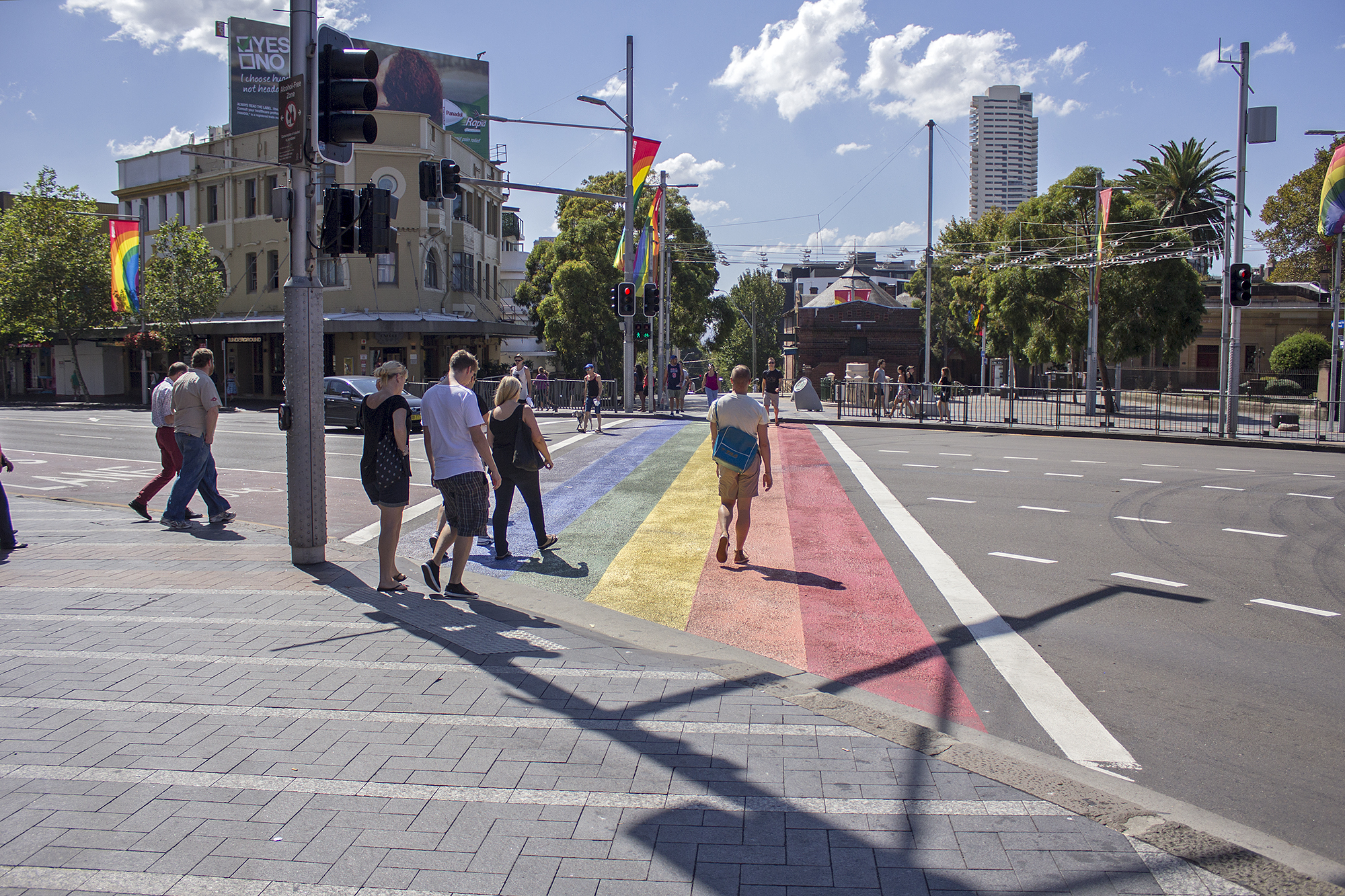

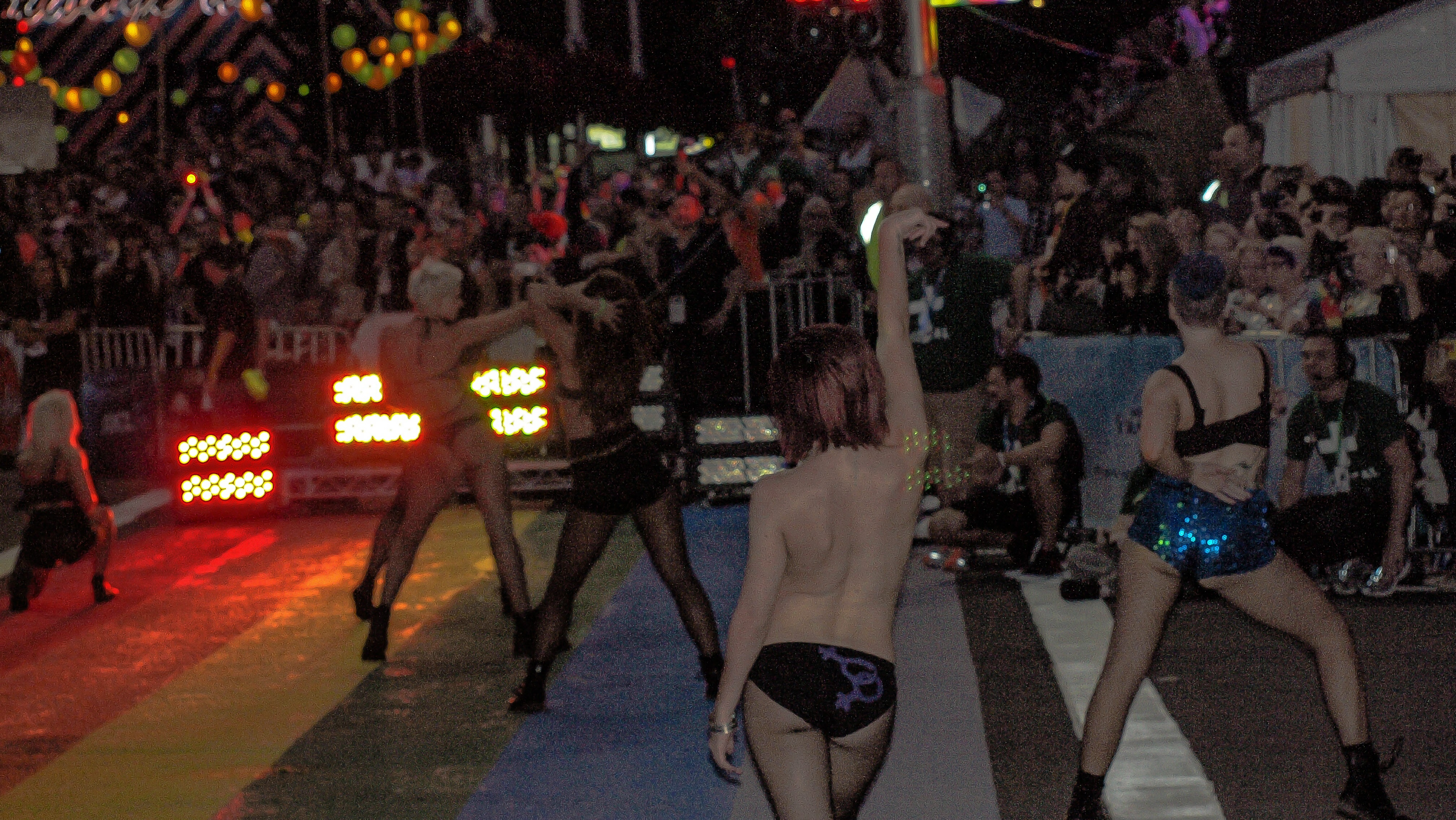
The first temporary rainbow crossing in Australia was located between the southern and northern ends of Taylor Square on Oxford St. It was first installed in February 2013 for the 35th Sydney Gay and Lesbian Mardi Gras and then removed in April 2013.

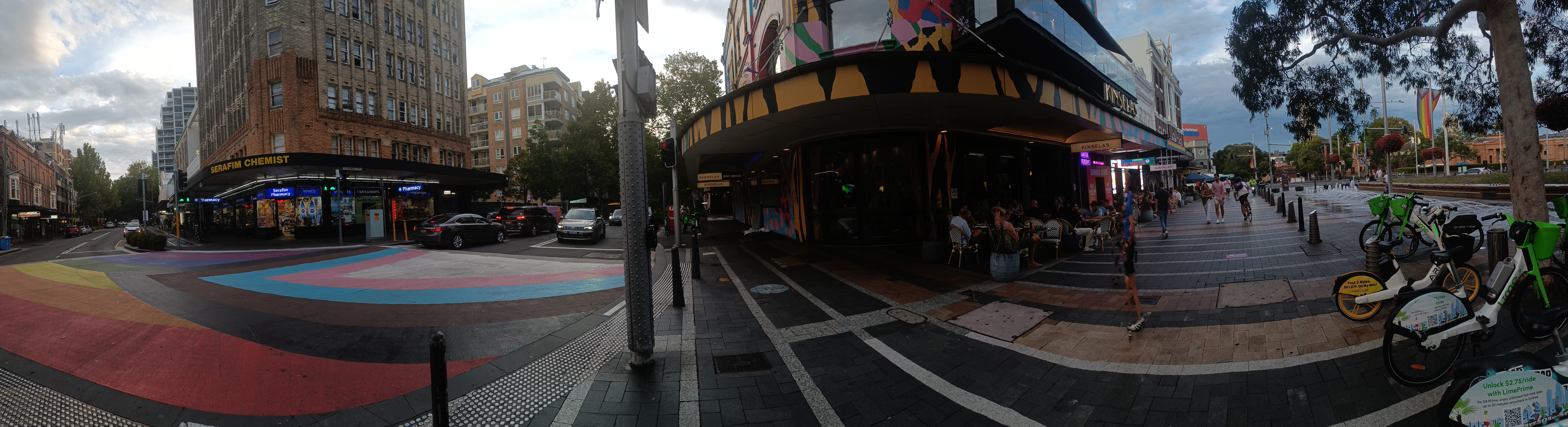
A new rainbow crossing was installed in 2019, and was updated in 2024 to include the progress pride flag. The crossing sits adjacent to the southern end of Taylor Square, on the corner of Campbell and Bourke streets, on the border between Surry Hills and Darlinghurst.

The City of Sydney unveiled a plan to "breathe new life" into the strip by updating the zoning rules along the strip, including increasing building height limits if developers comply with including community focused uses in the building.

=== 2011 ===
On 27 June 2011, the Lord Mayor of Sydney, Clover Moore proposed new directions for lower Oxford Street, and on 22 August 2011 the Council resolved to undertake a number of short, medium and long term initiatives to activate City owned properties in the precinct. After an Expression of Interest (EOI) was put out for creative and cultural organisations to occupy a vacant city owned property, 16 organisations were announced as being successful applicants and were granted office space as part of the Sydney 2030 plan to revitalise the Oxford Street Precinct with creative and cultural organisations that could help to drive foot traffic to the area as well as promote the community. The 16 organisations that were part of this programme were:

- AroundYou
- The Fortynine
- SCALE Architecture
- Queer ScreenMusic NSW
- Sydney Guild
- Dr Egg
- New Media Production Group
- Homework
- EngineRoom by Fishburners
- Rouse Phillips Textile Studio
- PROVINCE
- Envelop Entertainment
- World Famous Westsyde
- He Made She Made
- Platform72
- Under New Management

=== 2021–present ===
A major redevelopment, called Oxford & Foley, spanning three blocks on the north side of the strip, is expected to be completed in 2025.

== Major intersections ==
LGA	Location	km	mi	Destinations	Notes
Sydney	Darlinghurst–Surry Hills boundary	0.0	0.0	Liverpool Street (west) – Haymarket	Western terminus of street
Sydney	Darlinghurst–Surry Hills boundary	0.0	0.0	College Street (north) – Sydney CBD; Wentworth Avenue (south) – Haymarket, Redfern	
Sydney	Darlinghurst–Surry Hills boundary	0.1	0.062	Liverpool Street (one-way eastbound) – Darlinghurst	Eastbound entrance only
Sydney	Darlinghurst	0.4	0.25	Crown Street – Surry Hills	No right turn eastbound or westbound into Crown Street
Sydney	Darlinghurst	0.6	0.37	Flinders Street – Kingsford, Sydney Airport	Taylor Square intersection
Sydney–Woollahra boundary	Darlinghurst–Paddington boundary	0.9	0.56	Victoria Street (one-way southbound) – Kings Cross; Barcom Avenue (one-way northeast bound) – Darlinghurst; South Downling Street (south) – Kingsford, Sydney Airport	No right turn eastbound into South Dowling Street or westbound into Barcom Avenue
Sydney–Woollahra boundary	Paddington–Woollahra–Centennial Park tripoint	2.4	1.5	Queen Street (northeast) – Woollahra; Lang Road (south) – Moore Park	
Sydney–Woollahra boundary	Woollahra–Centennial Park boundary	2.5	1.6	Moore Park Road – Moore Park	Eastbound exit and westbound entrance only
Sydney–Woollahra boundary	Woollahra–Centennial Park boundary	3.2	2.0	Syd Einfeld Drive (northeast) – Bondi Junction; Ocean Street (north) – Woollahra; Wallis Street (one-way eastbound) – Woollahra	Eastbound exit and westbound entrance to Wallis Street only
Woollahra–Waverley boundary	Centennial Park–Bondi Junction boundary	3.3	2.1	York Road – Queens Park	
Woollahra–Waverley boundary	Bondi Junction–Woollahra boundary	4.5	2.8	Syd Einfeld Drive (northwest) – Bondi Junction; Bondi Road (southeast) – Bondi	
Woollahra–Waverley boundary	Bondi Junction–Woollahra boundary	4.5	2.8	Old South Head Road – Vaucluse, Watsons Bay	Southern terminus of road
Incomplete access; Route transition

== See also ==
- DIY rainbow crossing
- LGBTQ culture in Sydney
- Taylor Square
