= Signal Hill Battery =

Coastal defence fortification in Sydney, New South Wales, Australia

Coordinates: 33°50′59″S 151°17′14″E

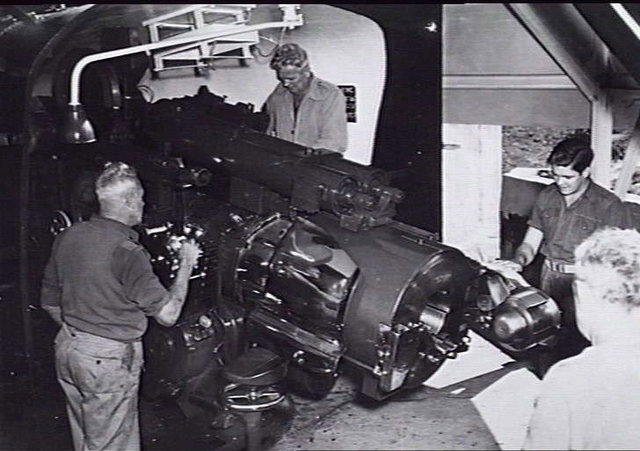
Signal Hill Battery, 1946

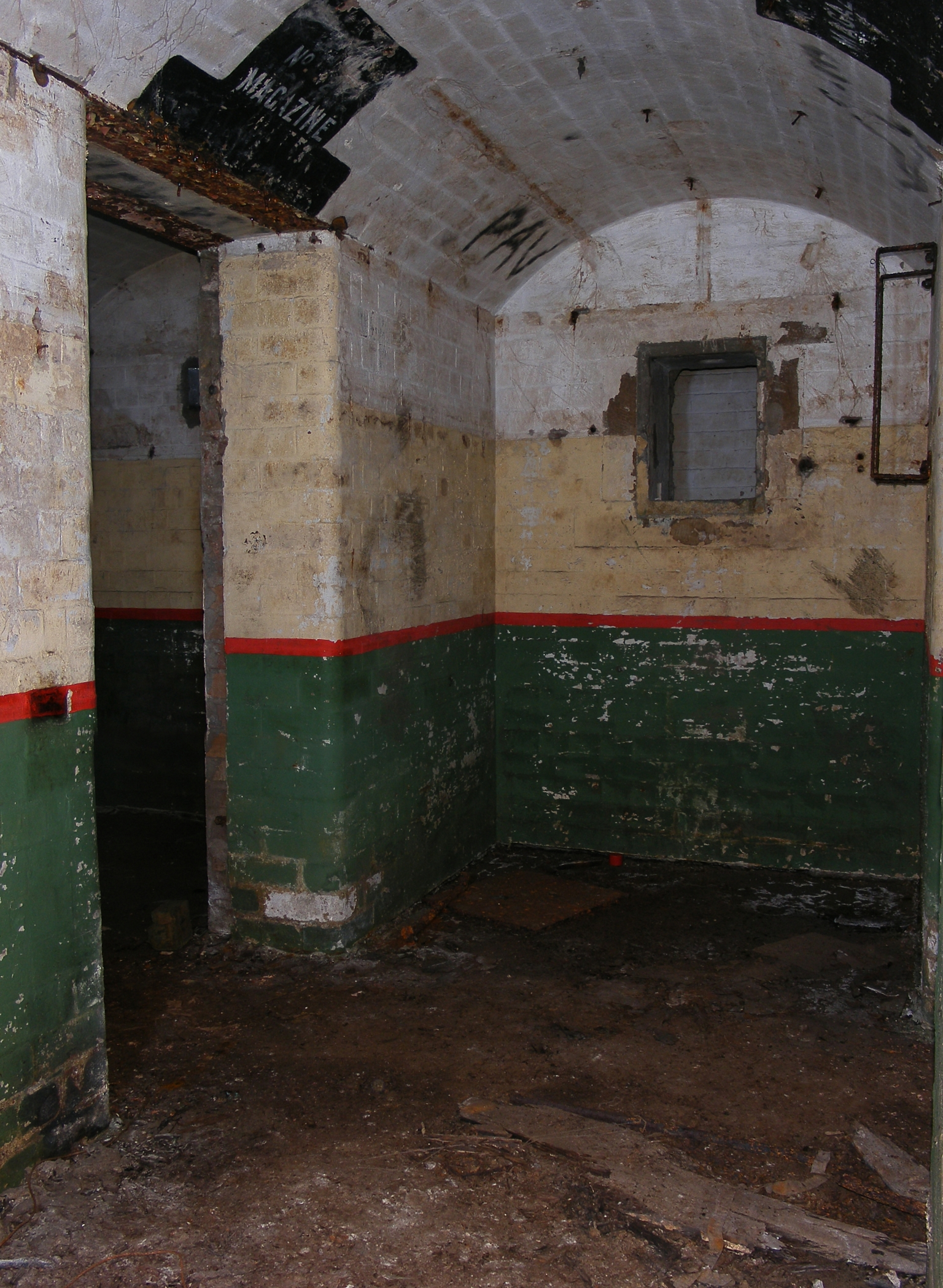
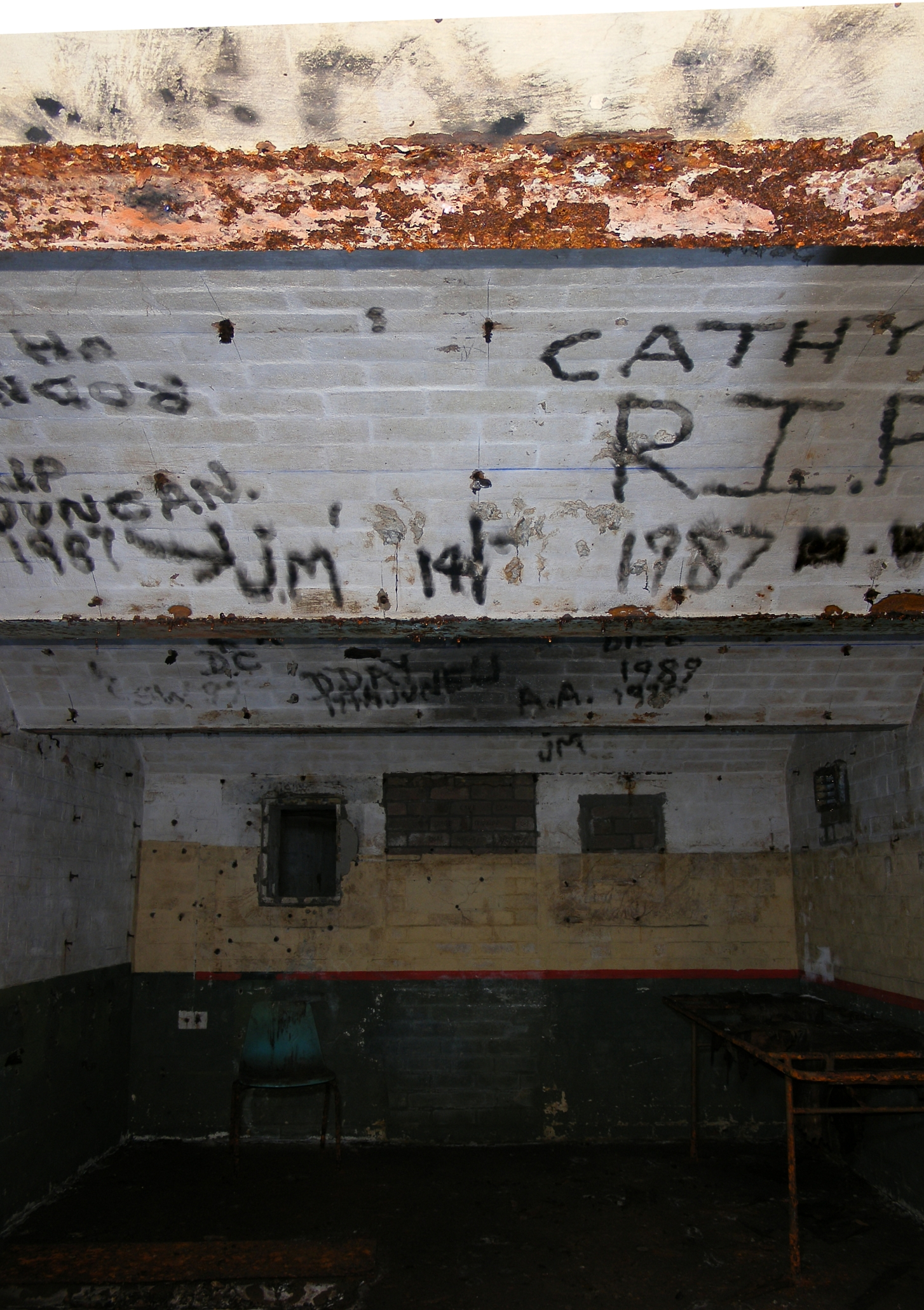
One of the corridors with the gunpowder magazine on the left. This part of the battery is located underground and under the public park adjacent to the Signal Hill Light House.

The Signal Hill Battery was constructed in 1892/93 at Watsons Bay and is adjacent to the Signal Hill Lighthouse on Old South Head Road.

== History and description ==
The Signal Hill Battery was one of a set of three coastal defence fortifications in Sydney, New South Wales, Australia, the other two being the Ben Buckler Gun Battery at Ben Buckler, and the Steel Point Battery, Clovelly. Each battery consisted of a gun pit that incorporated a BL 9.2-inch (234 mm) Mk VI breech-loading 'counter bombardment' British Armstrong 'disappearing' gun. The various Australian colonial governments bought nine such guns and an extra barrel before Federation. The Signal Hill gun bore Serial Number 7318 and its barrel survives and is on public display at North Fort, North Head, at the Northern end of Australia's Memorial Walk.

These fortifications were the last link in Sydney's outer defence perimeter, which was intended to defend Sydney from bombardment by an enemy vessel standing off the coast. The fortifications built in the 1890s around Sydney's eastern suburbs were the culmination of some twenty years of construction of harbour defence installations that reflected the changing policy of the time to meet new technologies, threats and styles of warfare.

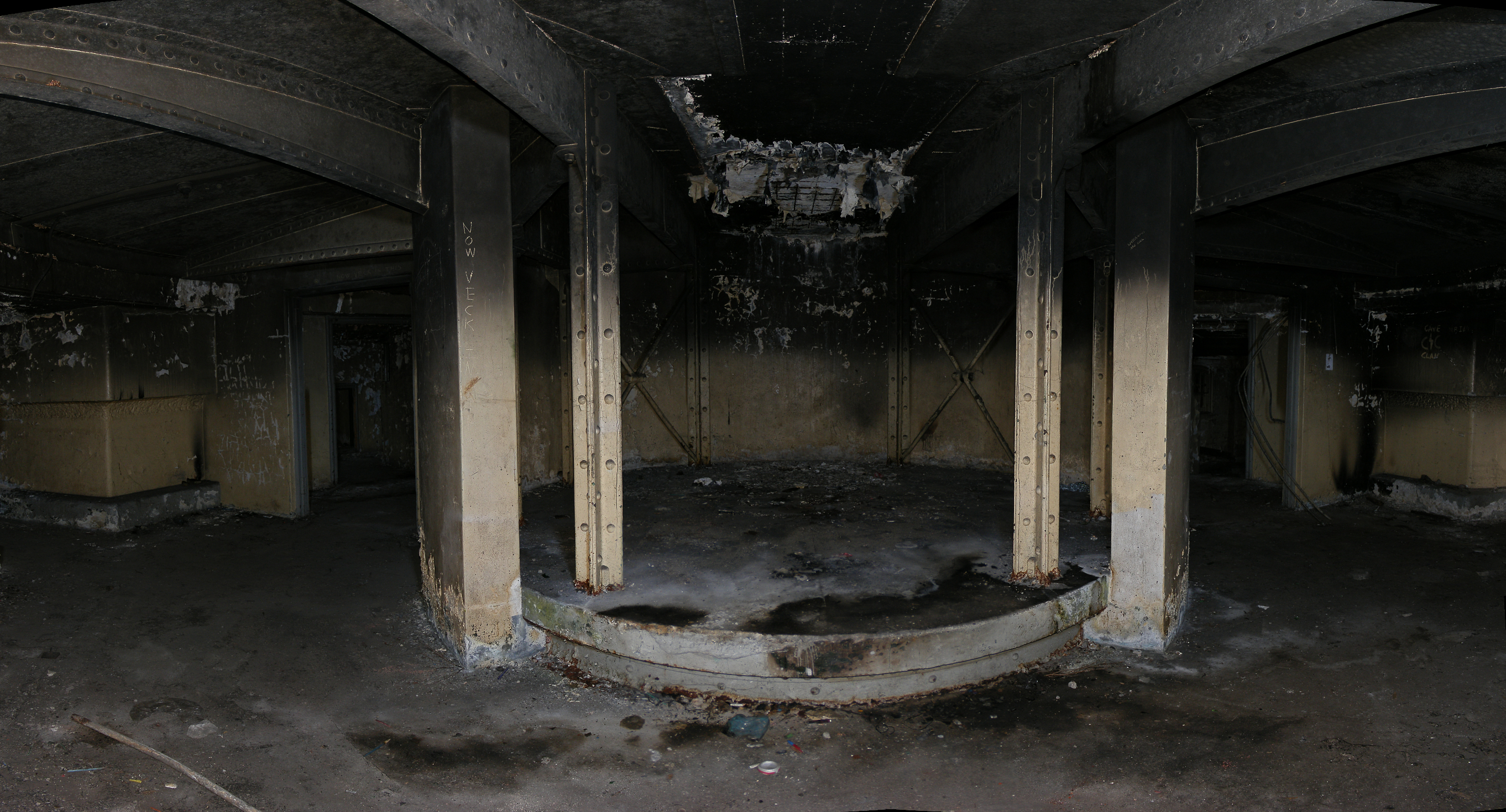
Inside the gun emplacement

The 9.2-inch (234 mm) breech loading gun was fired for the last time in 1933. It was removed and replaced in 1937 by two 6-inch (152 mm) Mk XI guns placed in each of two outer gun emplacements; these guns were removed after WWII. The fortification also has an underground complex that runs beneath Old South Head Road. It contains a maze of rooms and corridors including a mess room, elevator shaft and gunpowder magazines. The entrance from the street has been tack welded and sealed.

A memorial was placed there in November 1992 by the Royal Australian Signal Corps Association on behalf of its members. Two plaques were also placed on 30 March 1993, putting the reserve in proper historical perspective.

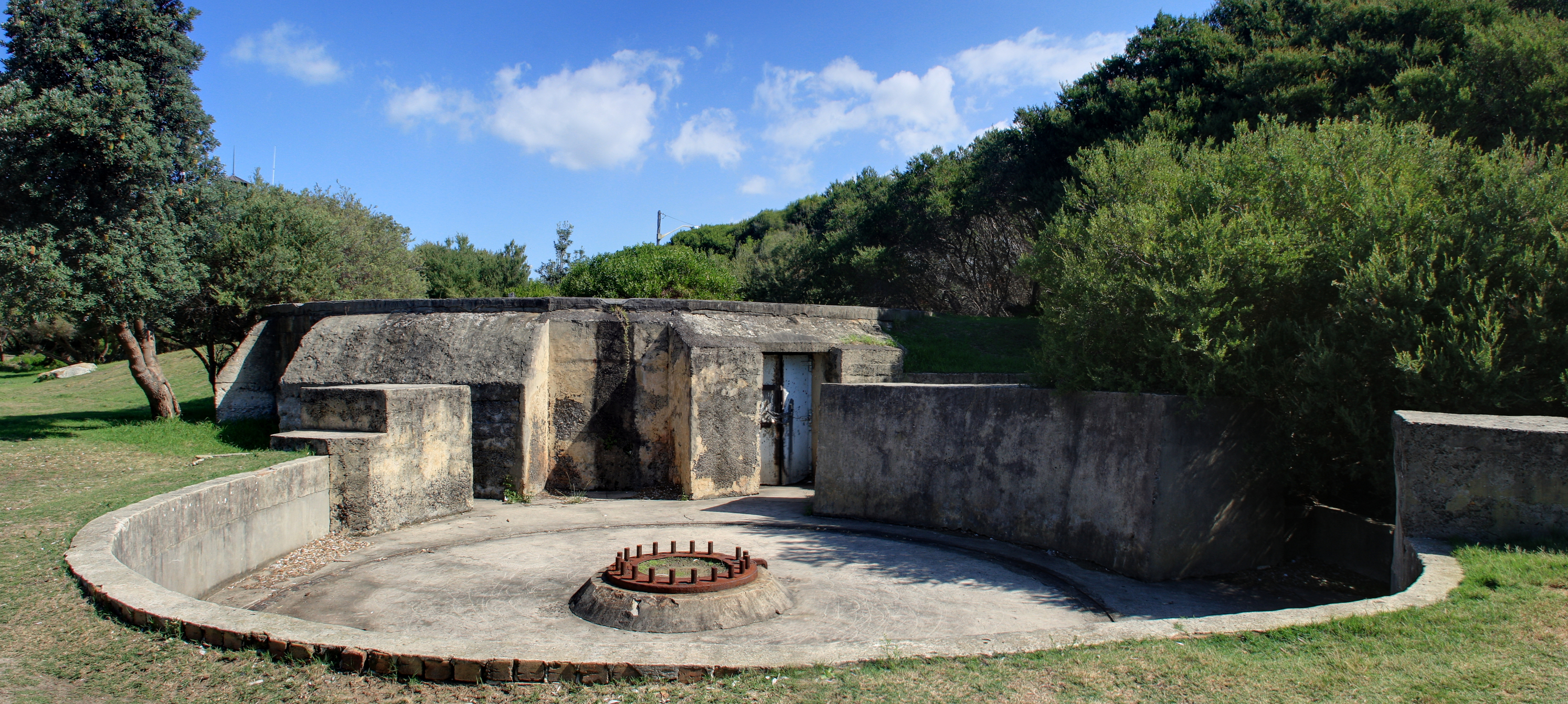
Exterior

== See also ==
- Military history of Australia

Media related to Signal Hill Battery at Wikimedia Commons
