= AroundYou =

AroundYou is an Australian social enterprise founded in 2009 and is focused on using digital technology to promote community engagement and participation.

AroundYou was established as a result of numerous research papers released by both local and state governments, which indicated that, across all states, the rate of reported community engagement and participation had been falling since statistics were first collected in 1985.

== Background Information ==
AroundYou operates the following services:

- Aggregation of community information across Australia, including hyper-local content relating to events, businesses and community attractions.
- Syndication of restructured data to local governments, media organisations and business bureaus, for the purpose of making local content more readily accessible to the general public.
- Support of local businesses through the “Think Local, Buy Local” initiative.

AroundYou works collaboratively with numerous media organisations, local governments and other enterprises to achieve its goals and, today, has more than 250,000 members across Australia who use the services of AroundYou.

AroundYou has offices in:

- Sydney, Australia
- Canberra, Australia
- Manila, Philippines

== Partnership with The Australian Centre For Social Innovation ==
In October 2010, AroundYou was announced as a winner in the Bold Ideas, Better Lives Challenge, organised by The Australian Centre For Social Innovation (TACSI), with funding provided by the South Australian government and awarded by then Premier Mike Rann.

The Bold Ideas, Better Lives Challenge was orchestrated as a national search to identify Australia’s strongest social innovations with TACSI posing the question “what do you think the big problems are facing our society and how do you think we can solve them?”.

AroundYou responded by outlining the case for a digital solution to the problem of decreasing levels of community engagement and participation. After competing against 258 other applications, AroundYou was announced as one of eight winners and was to share in a $1 million prize.

== Addressing Community Engagement & Participation ==
In July 2012, Flinders University conducted an in depth evaluation report as to the effect the AroundYou services were having with a specific focus on using analytical data to determine exactly what social impact AroundYou was having.

After six months of research which included both qualitative and quantitative findings, it was determined that AroundYou was indeed having a positive social impact as indicated by increasing rates of community participating in the areas that were subjected to the research.

== Member of the Sydney 2030 – Creative and Cultural Spaces ==
In October 2011, the City of Sydney called for an Expression of Interest (EOI) from innovative and creative enterprises to activate and occupy City owned space on Oxford Street, Sydney as part of the broader Oxford Street Revival Programme.

From a field of 52 submissions, AroundYou was selected by the City of Sydney as one of 16 tenants in the space, due to its approach of using digital technology to promote community engagement.

After moving into the Oxford Street premises, AroundYou gained notoriety first by establishing a City endorsed start up networking event called 66 Meetups and then later as being crowned the programmes ‘first graduate’. Having experienced rapid growth during this time, AroundYou moved their offices to a much larger 300spm office in the heart of the Sydney CBD, near Town Hall.

== 66 Meetups Networking Event ==
AroundYou is notable for creating and facilitating the quarterly 66 Meetups Networking Event. This event is held every three months and is endorsed and funded by the City of Sydney as a means to bring together entrepreneurs, investors and the media with the purpose of helping to showcase and promote Sydney as a hub for start-up enterprises.

Speakers at the 66 Meetups Networking Event have included numerous notable personalities including:

- Clover Moore (Lord Mayor of Sydney)
- Peter Davison (Early investor in PayPal & Cofounder of Fishburners)
- Hamish Hawthorn (CEO, ATP Innovations)
- Michael Fox (Cofounder, Shoes of Prey)
