= Bondi Road =

Road in Sydney, Australia

Bondi Road New South Wales
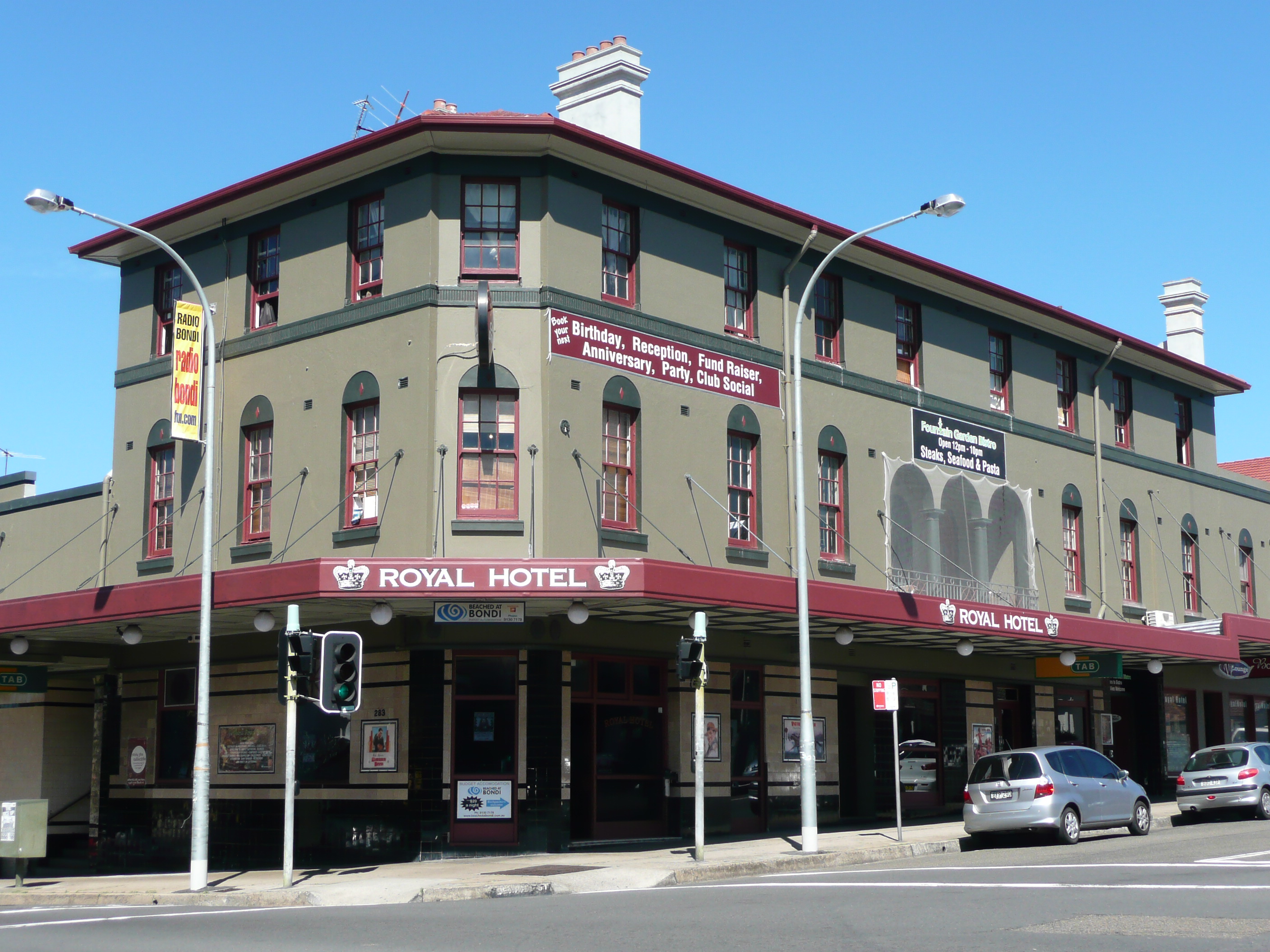
- Royal Hotel on Bondi Road
- Coordinates: 33.891005°S 151.253362°E (West end); 33.895116°S 151.273239°E (East end)

General information
- Type: Street
- Length: 2.0 km (1.2 mi)
- Gazetted: August 1928

Major junctions
- West end: Syd Einfeld Drive; Bondi Junction, Sydney
- Old South Head Road; Oxford Street
- East end: Campbell Parade; Bondi Beach, Sydney

Location(s)
- Major suburbs: Bondi

Bondi Road is a 2-kilometre-long (1.2 mi) major road through the Sydney suburb of Bondi, Australia.

== Route ==
Bondi Road commences at the intersection of Syd Einfeld Drive, Oxford Street and Old South Head Road in Bondi Junction and heads in an easterly direction as a four-lane, single carriageway road through Bondi, until it turns into Campbell Parade at Bondi Beach.

== History ==
=== Trams to Bondi ===
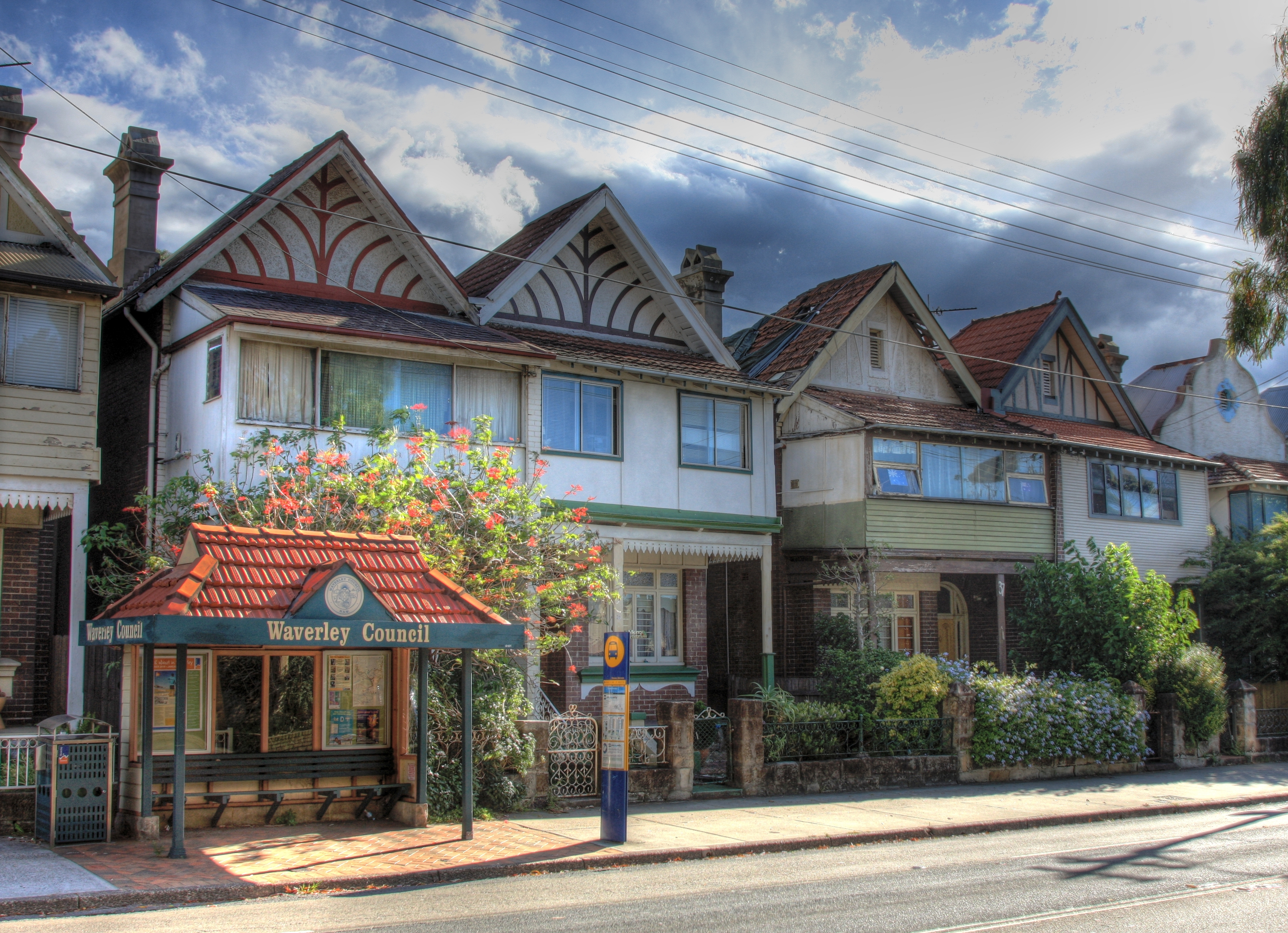
Terraced houses, Bondi Junction

Bondi Road was once serviced by electric trams. From 1902 to 1960, services to Bondi, Bondi Beach and North Bondi ran via Bondi Road or Bellevue Hill. Services from the CBD commenced at Circular Quay (via Bridge and Elizabeth Streets) or Railway Square (via Elizabeth and Liverpool streets). From Oxford Street, the line travelled through to Bondi Junction, where it joined Bondi Road. On the descent to Bondi Beach, trams entered Campbell Parade via an under pass at a point where Bondi Road was too steep, first by turning right into Denham Street, then left into Fletcher Street and Rowland Avenue, where the under pass was once located (now developed into apartments at 331A Bondi Road). A feature of this line was the large three-track terminus cut into a hillside at North Bondi, which opened in 1946. The under pass and cutting have now been filled in; part of it is now public reserve and apartments. The tunnel entrance is still visible at the apartments.

=== Road classification ===
The passing of the Main Roads Act of 1924 through the Parliament of New South Wales provided for the declaration of Main Roads, roads partially funded by the state government through the Main Roads Board. Main Road No. 172 was declared along this road on 8 August 1928, from Bondi Junction to the beach (and continuing westwards along Oxford Street to the boundary with the City of Sydney); with the passing of the Main Roads (Amendment) Act of 1929 to provide for additional declarations of State Highways and Trunk Roads, this was amended to Main Road 172 on 8 April 1929.

The passing of the Roads Act of 1993 updated road classifications and the way they could be declared within New South Wales. Under this act, Bondi Road retains its declaration as part of Main Road 172.

== Description and points of interest ==
Federation cottages

In the first two hundred metres from Oxford Street, there are several examples of the Federation cottage. This was the Australian version of the Queen Anne architectural style, and was the most popular housing style in Australia between 1900 and 1910.

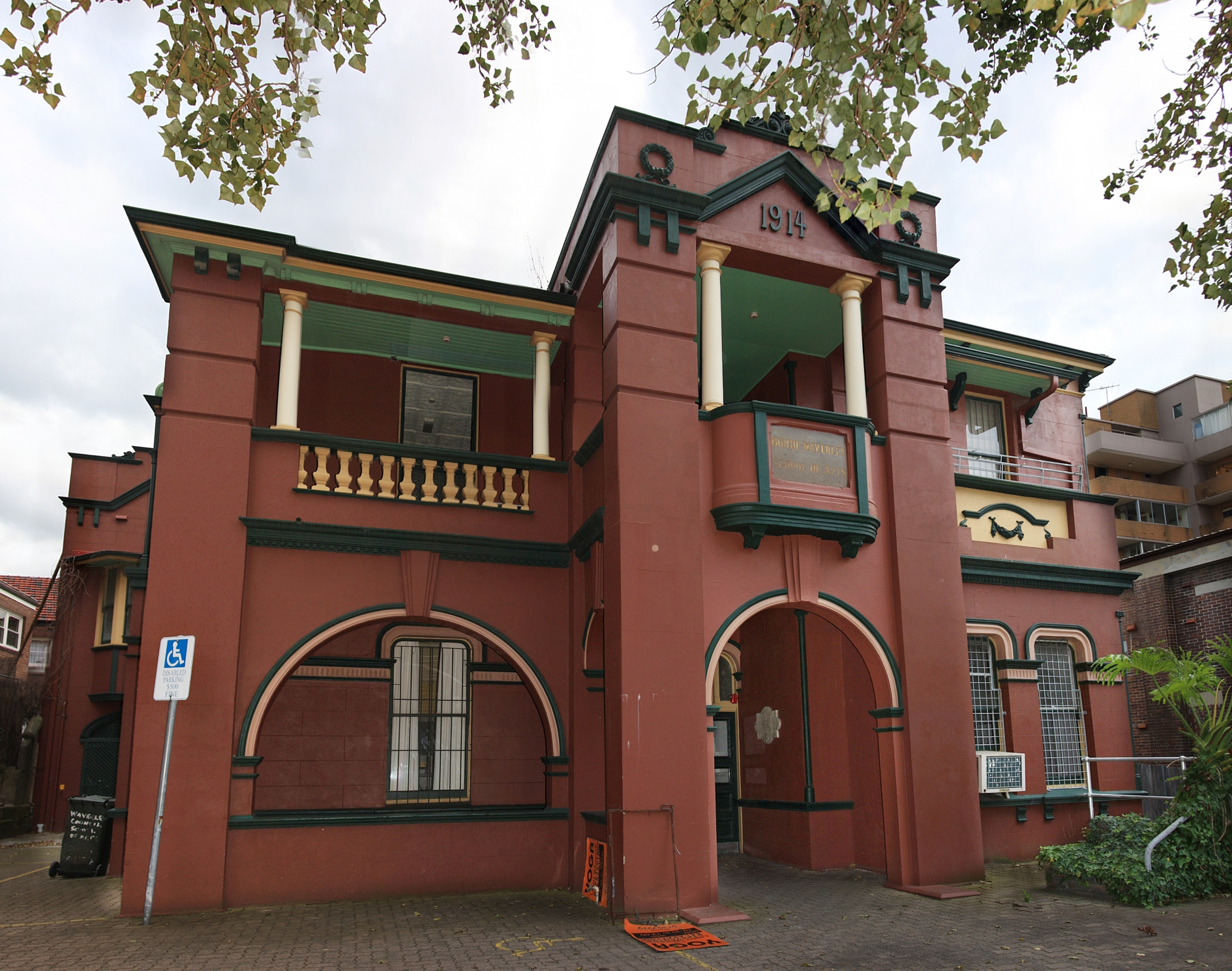
Bondi Waverley School of Arts

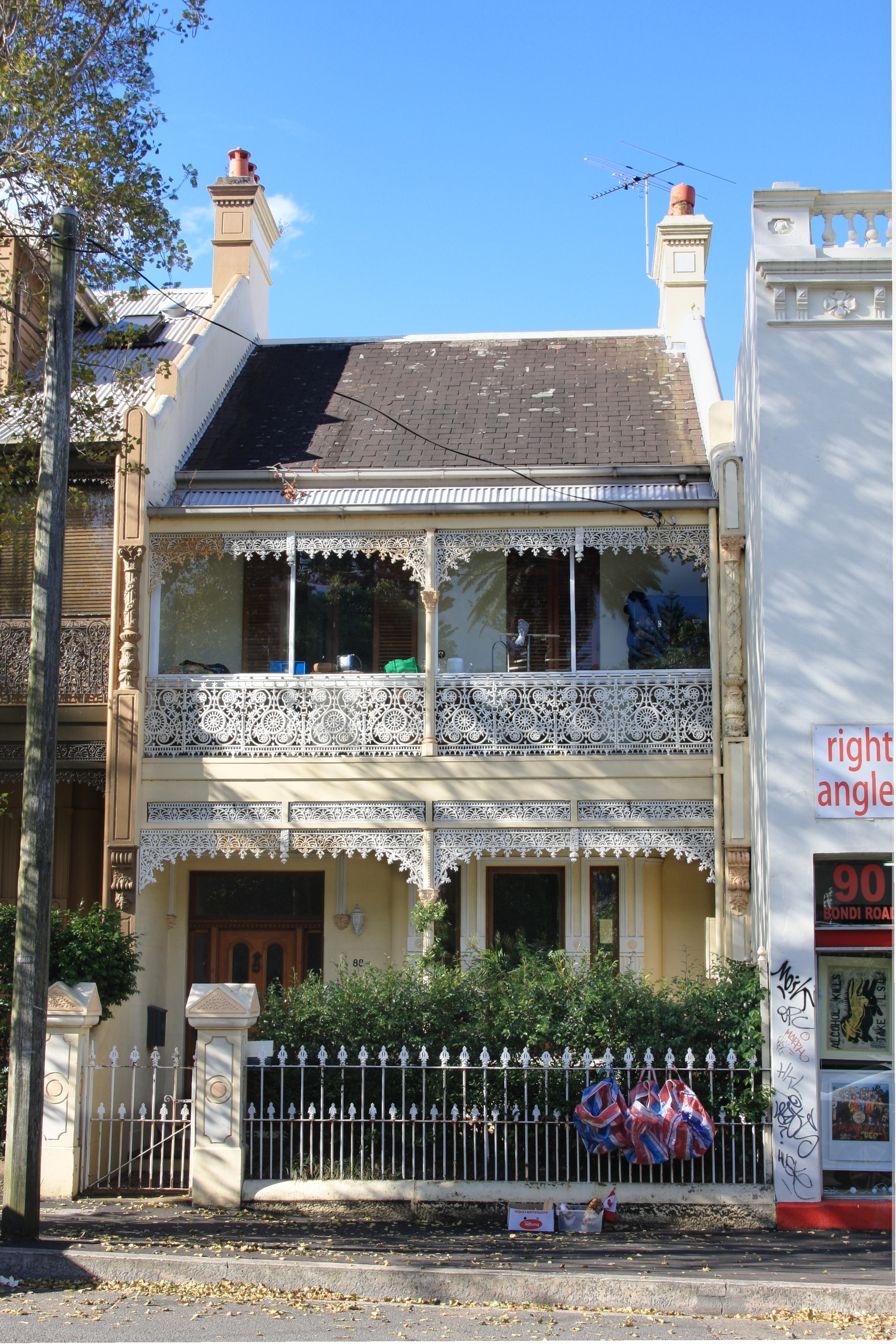
Terraced home with wrought iron balcony

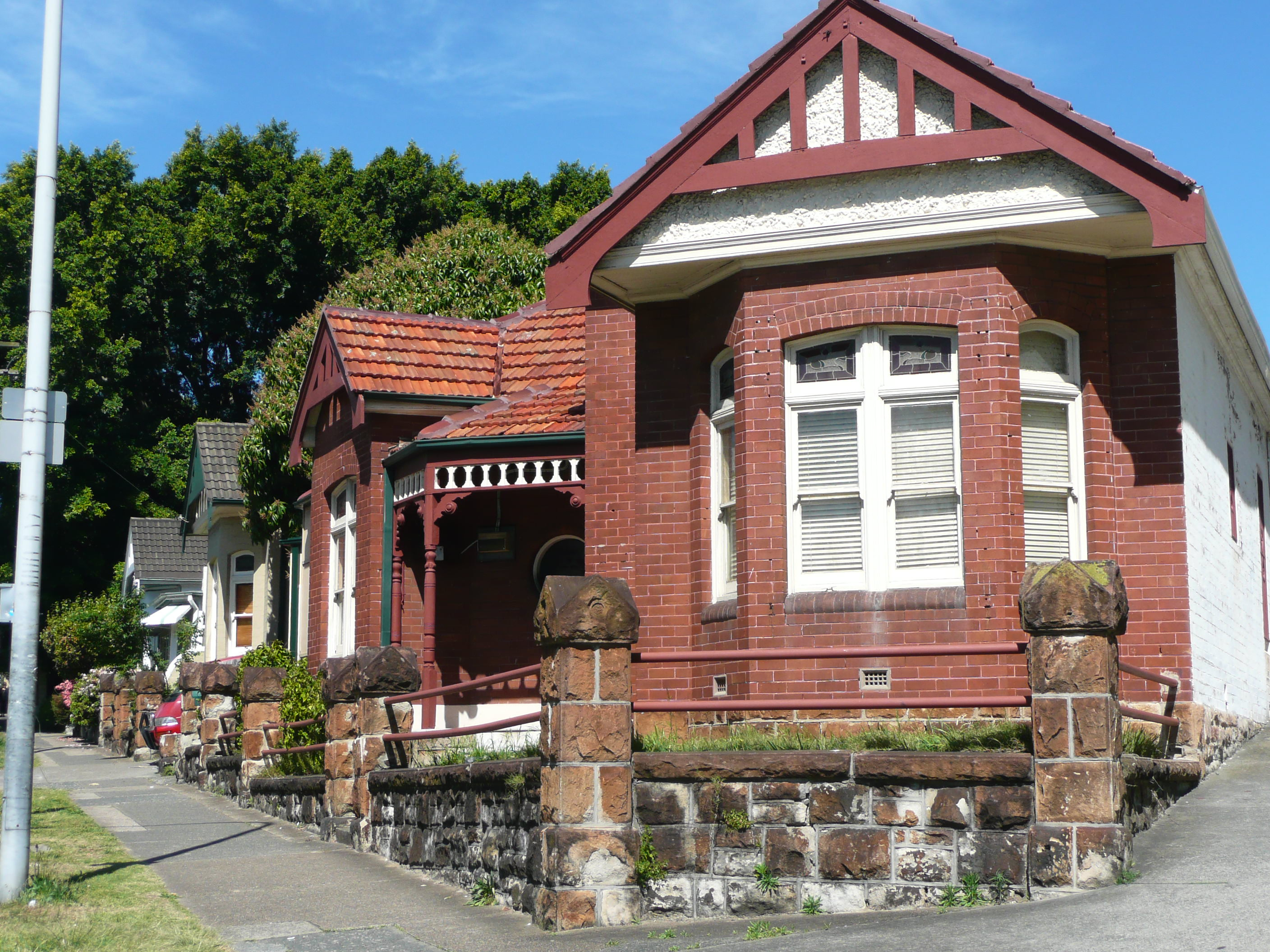
Federation cottage

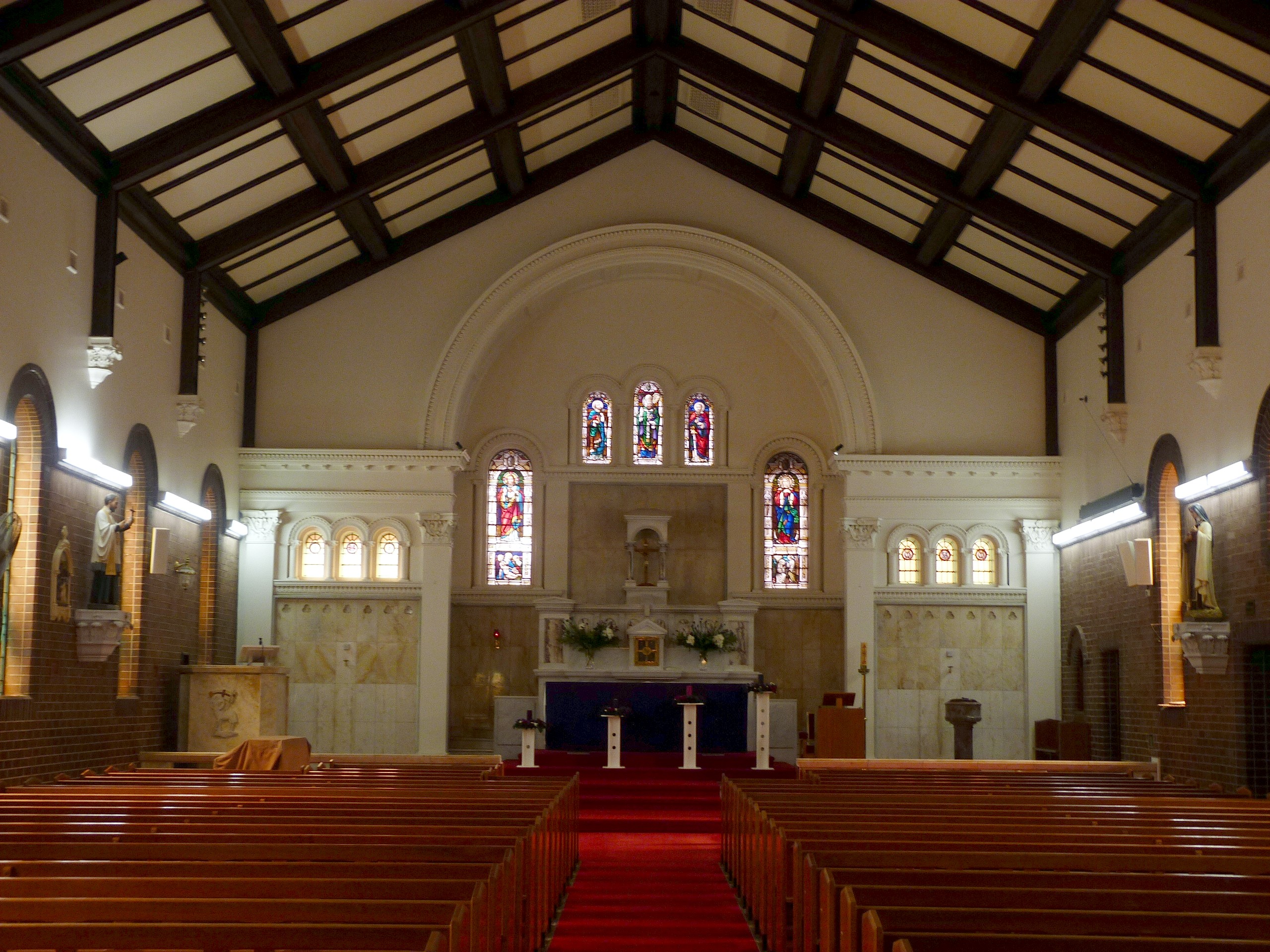
St Patrick's Catholic Church

Terraced homes

On the north side of the road there is a strip of terraced houses in the Victorian style, with characteristic wrought iron balconies. This contrasted with the woodwork that was preferred in the Federation era.

Waverley Council Chambers

On the south side of Bondi Road are the Waverley Council Chambers, the headquarters of the Waverley Municipality. The present building incorporates the earlier building designed in the Federation Free Classical style. The first chambers—a smaller building in Gothic Revival style—were demolished.

Waverley Park

Immediately behind the Council Chambers is Waverley Park, which includes a war memorial, play area, tennis courts and oval. The war memorial commemorates the men and women of the Waverley area who served in World War Two. It was dedicated on Anzac Sunday, 1956.

Bondi Waverley School of Arts

This building is situated on the north side of the road and was built in 1914. Run by Waverley Council, it functions as a community centre and is also used by the Waverley Woollahra Arts School. It is an example of Victorian influence in architecture and has a state heritage listing.

Shopping Strip

East of Bennett Street is a shopping strip that includes older shops and dwellings in a mixture of Federation and Victorian styles, plus conspicuous influence of the Arts and Crafts style. There is also a group of three Federation cottages.

Post Office

On the corner of Bondi Road and Ocean Street is the post office, which dates back to c. 1907. The building was constructed in the Arts and Crafts style that was popular in the Federation period and has a state heritage listing.

St Patrick's Catholic Church

Located on the corner of Bondi Road and Wellington Street, this church was built in 1929–30. The site was originally occupied by a cottage that was used by Sisters of St Joseph from 1896. Later, a new convent, church and school were built on adjoining land. The church is heritage-listed.

Royal Hotel

The Royal Hotel is located on the corner of Bondi Road and Denham Street. It was built in 1901–02. In February 1907, the Bondi Surf Bathers' Life Saving Club was formed at a meeting in this hotel, making it the oldest surf life-saving club in the world.

== Major intersections ==
LGA	Location	km	mi	Destinations	Notes
Woollahra–Waverley boundary	Bondi Junction–Woollahra boundary	0.0	0.0	Syd Einfeld Drive (northwest) – Bondi Junction	Western terminus of road
Woollahra–Waverley boundary	Bondi Junction–Woollahra boundary	0.0	0.0	Old South Head Road (northeast) – Vaucluse, Watsons Bay; Oxford Street (southwest) – Bondi Junction, Paddington	
Waverley	Bondi Junction	0.3	0.19	Council Street (south) – Waverley; Waverley Street (west) Bondi Junction	
Waverley	Bondi Beach	2.0	1.2	Francis Street – Bondi Beach	
Waverley	Bondi Beach	2.0	1.2	Campbell Parade – Bondi Beach, North Bondi	Eastern terminus of road
Route transition
