= Old South Head Road =

Road in Sydney, Australia

Old South Head Road New South Wales
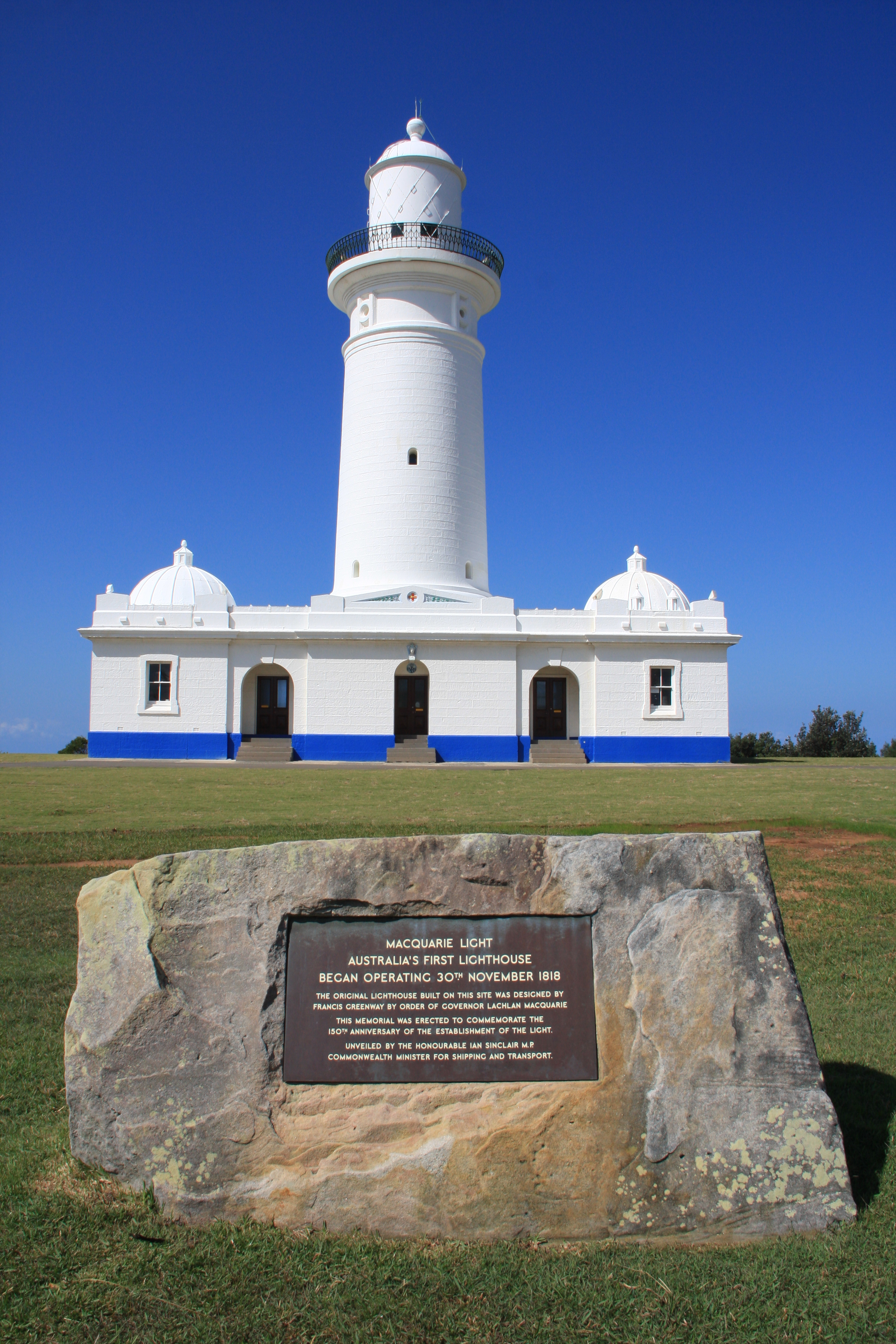
- Macquarie Lighthouse, Australia's first lighthouse, Vaucluse
- Coordinates: 33.891004°S 151.253358°E (South end); 33.844790°S 151.282760°E (North end)

General information
- Type: Road
- Length: 6.8 km (4.2 mi)
- Gazetted: July 1933

Major junctions
- South end: Oxford Street; Bondi Junction, Sydney
- Syd Einfeld Drive; Bondi Road; New South Head Road
- North end: Robertson Place; Watsons Bay, Sydney

Location(s)
- Major suburbs: Bondi Beach, Rose Bay, Vaucluse

Old South Head Road is a major road in Sydney, linking the eastern suburb of Bondi Junction to Watsons Bay on the South Head peninsula. It is historically significant because its earliest origins can be traced back to the early days of the colony of New South Wales.

== Route ==
Old South Head Road commences at the intersection with Oxford Street, Syd Einfeld Drive and Bondi Road in Bondi Junction and heads in a north-easterly direction as a four-lane, single carriageway road, passing through the suburbs of Bondi, Bondi Beach, North Bondi and Rose Bay. It meets New South Head Road at a roundabout in Vaucluse, continuing north until it eventually terminates at a roundabout with Robertson Place in Watsons Bay.

Old South Head Road passes through predominantly residential areas, with sizeable shopping centres around the intersections with Towns Road and Dover Road. Housing varies from detached homes to blocks of flats and units. The style of housing includes Federation homes, Victorian homes and Art Deco blocks of flats towards Bondi Junction.

== History ==
The colony at Sydney began on 21 January 1788, when the First Fleet arrived in Sydney Harbour and Captain Arthur Phillip went ashore at what is now known as Camp Cove. The settlement itself was set up in Sydney Cove, at the spot now known as Circular Quay. One of the reasons for the choice of that location was the desire to be safely out of range of hostile artillery. The colony needed to keep watch on the seas for potentially hostile ships or the Second Fleet, which meant that South Head became important as an observation post. The outer edge of South Head became a signal station from which ships could be seen; their approach could then be signalled with flags. The ships could then be met by pilots who were camped at Camp Cove (so named for that reason).

A proper signal station was established in 1790; it was supplied by boat until a bridle trail was created along the ridge to South Head. Construction of a road followed and it was completed in 1811. A lighthouse was built just south of the signal station in 1816–18, to a design by Francis Greenway, the first notable architect in the colony. A semaphore system replaced flags at the signal station in the 1840s and the present building was constructed to a design by Colonial Architect Mortimer Lewis. It has been in continuous use since then and is now heritage-listed. In 1858, the first telegraph line in New South Wales was used to connect the signal station with the Royal Exchange in Bridge Street.

The passing of the Main Roads Act of 1924 through the Parliament of New South Wales provided for the declaration of Main Roads, roads partially funded by the State government through the Main Roads Board (MRB). With the subsequent passing of the Main Roads (Amendment) Act of 1929 to provide for additional declarations of State Highways and Trunk Roads, the Department of Main Roads (having succeeded the MRB in 1932) declared Main Road 339 from the intersection with Oxford Street in Bondi Junction to the intersection with Robertson Place in Watsons Bay on 18 July 1933.

The passing of the Roads Act of 1993 updated road classifications and the way they could be declared within New South Wales. Under this act, Old South Head Road retains its declaration as Main Road 339.

== Points of interest ==
(RNE) indicates that the structure or site is listed on the Register of the National Estate.

- St Peter's Anglican Church, Watsons bay, designed by Edmund Blacket and built in 1864 (RNE)
- Our Lady Star of the Sea Catholic Church, Watsons Bay, built 1909–1910, with later additions in 1929, 1940 and 1966 (RNE)
- Scout hall, Watsons Bay, formerly a school, designed by George Mansfield and built in 1876 (RNE)
- A former school residence, next to the scout hall, designed by George Mansfield and built by George Murray c. 1876 (RNE)
- Sandstone obelisk, Robertson Park (not situated in Old South Head Road), commemorating building of Old South Head Road in 1811 (RNE)
- Signal Station, still functional and operated by Transport for NSW (RNE)

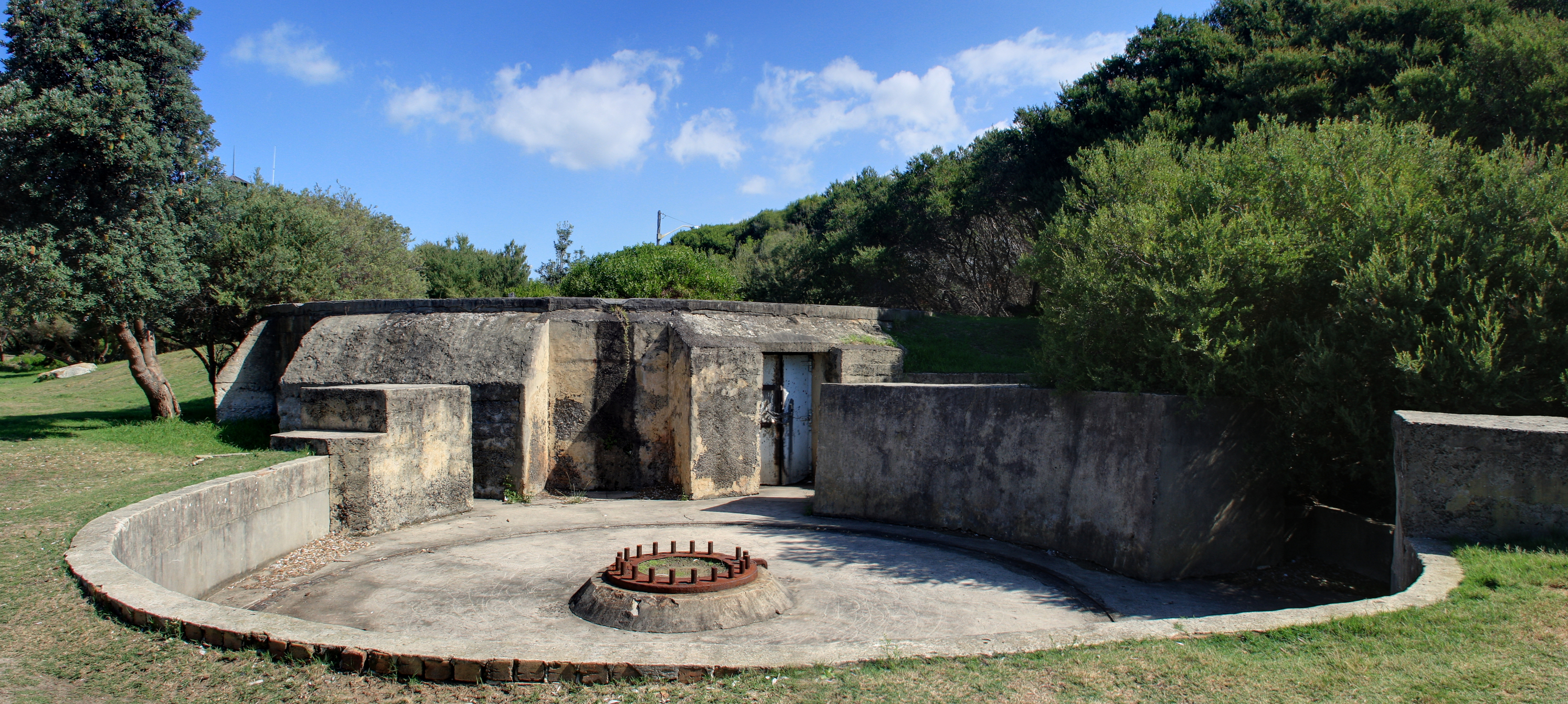
Signal Hill Battery

- Signal Hill Battery is situated between Gap Park and Signal Station. The site includes two gun emplacements that are connected to underground bunker complexes.
- Macquarie Lighthouse: the present lighthouse is a replica of Greenway's original building, which was demolished because it was in bad repair. The current building was built in 1883 to a design by James Barnet. The group also includes the keeper's cottage and an earlier cottage by Greenway (RNE)
- Gap Park is situated between Old South Head Road and the cliff, and leads to the Gap, a notorious suicide spot
- Coastal Cliff Walk is a walking trail that goes from Clarke Street to South head.
- Christison Park is situated south of Macquarie Lighthouse
- South Head Cemetery. Situated at the juncture of Old South Head Road and New South Head Road, this cemetery was established in 1845 to service the growing Vaucluse area. Poor record keeping means the earliest recorded interment was in 1869. Some of the first Trustees of the cemetery in 1845 were Henry Gibson (Pilot of Watsons Bay), Richard Siddins, Rev L. E. Threlkeld. Well-known inhabitants include Sir John Robertson, the Packer family, the Fairfax family, Juanita Nielsen and Sir Walter Edward Davidson.
- Former Methodist Church, built 1924, currently houses Magnolia Healing Centre. It is located at the corner of Old South Head Road and Dover Road, Rose Bay, and is supported by Bondi Beach Chapel by the Sea and Rose Bay/Vaucluse Uniting Church.
- Royal Sydney Golf Course is situated between Old South Head Road and New South Head Road, Rose Bay.
- Architecture: examples of Art Deco blocks of flats, single-storey Federation homes and Victorian-style cottages can be seen between Victoria Road and Bondi Road.
- A two-storey Victorian terrace home near Bondi Road used to house the Mahasiddha Kadampa Buddhist Centre, which holds meditation courses and drop-in classes.
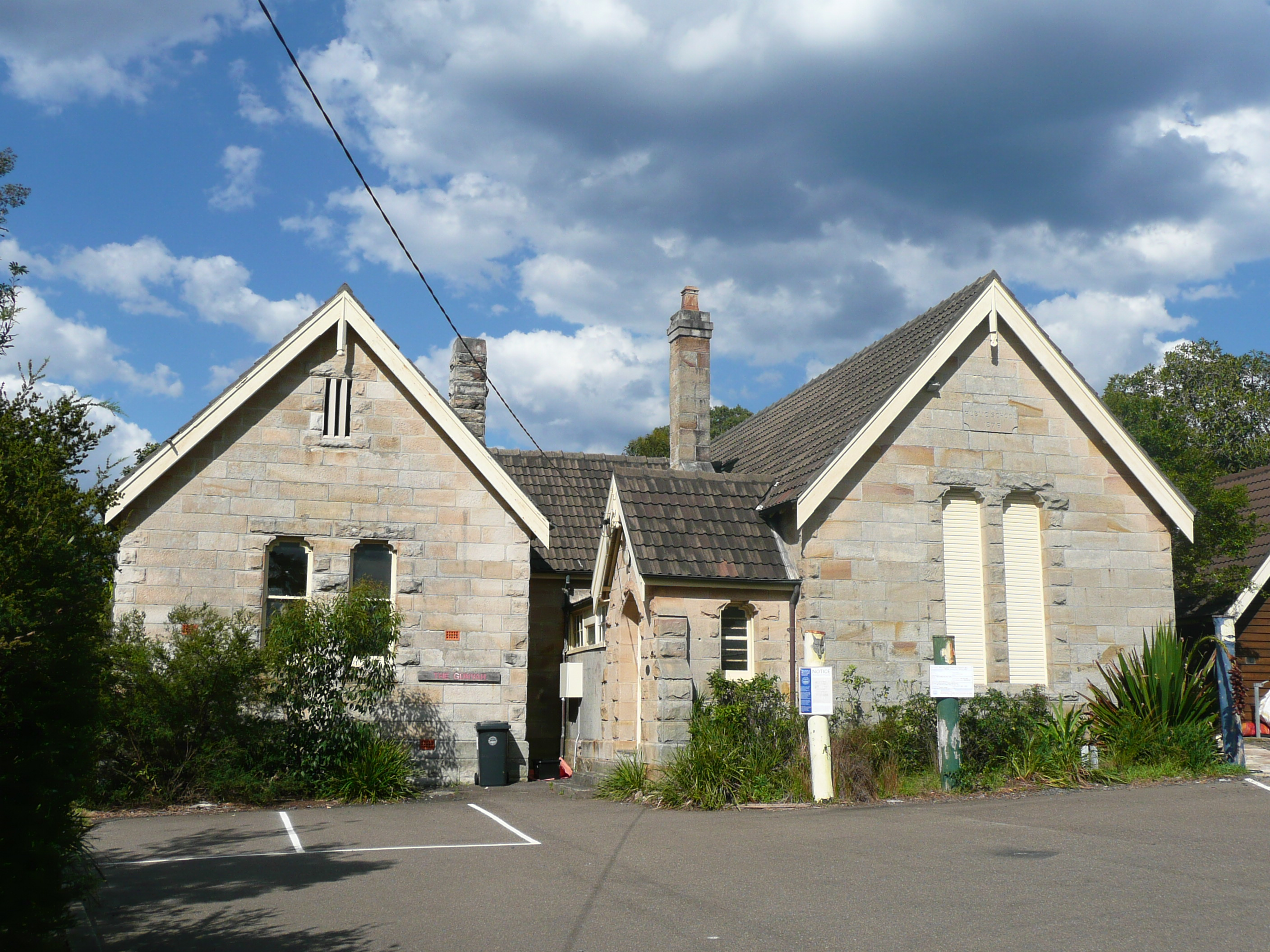
Scout hall, formerly a school, Watsons Bay

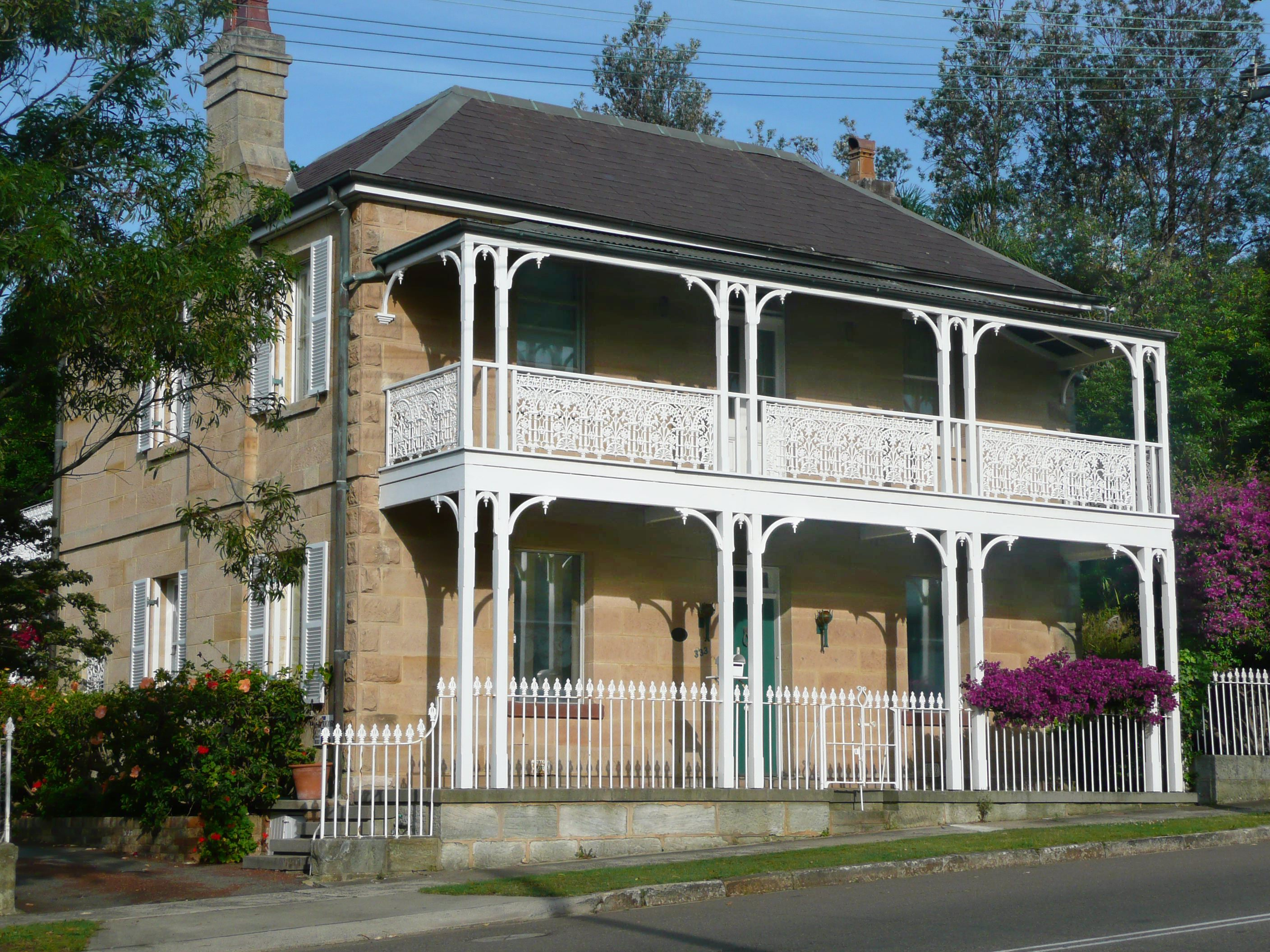
Former school residence, Watsons Bay

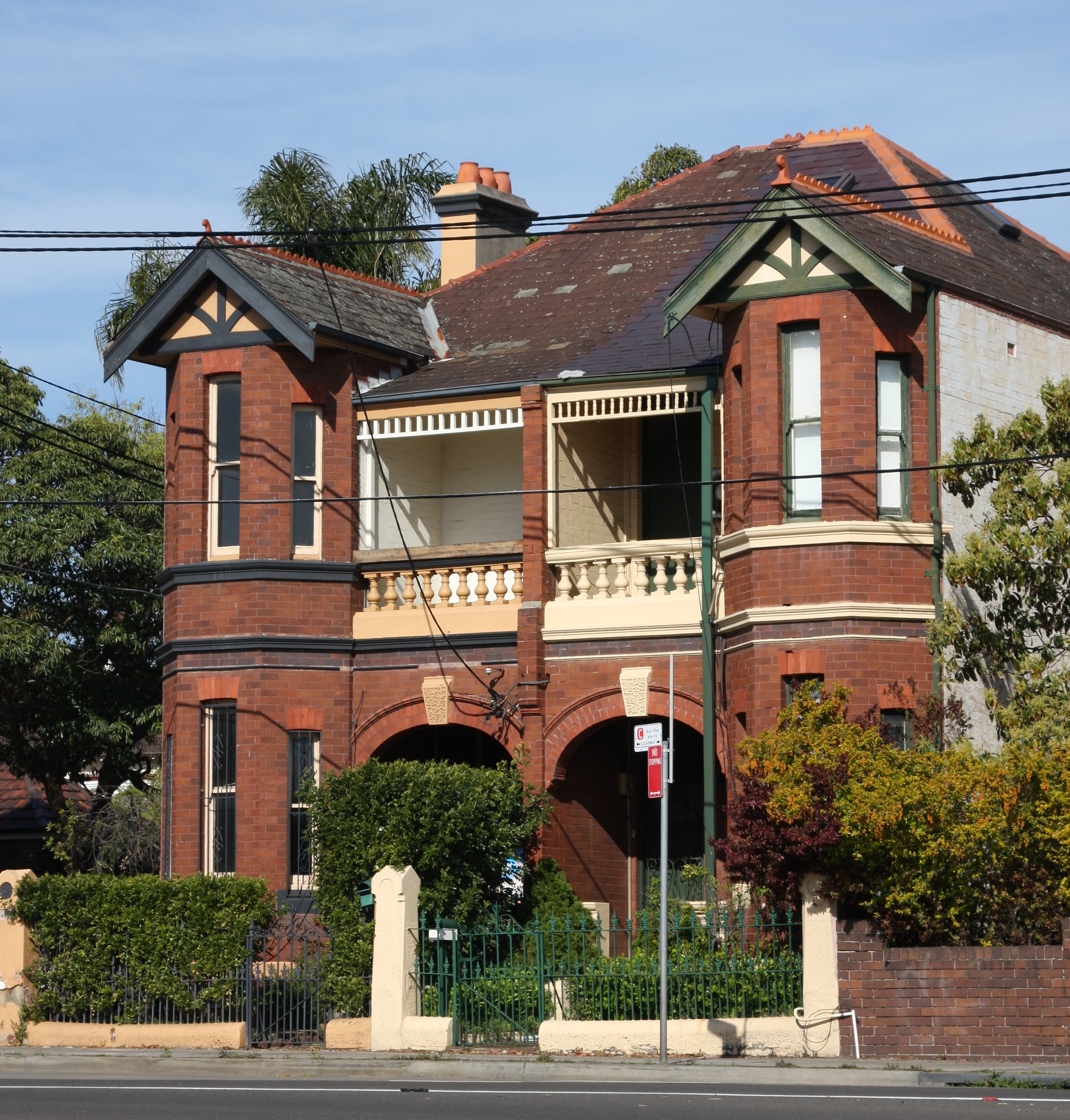
Federation homes, Bondi Junction

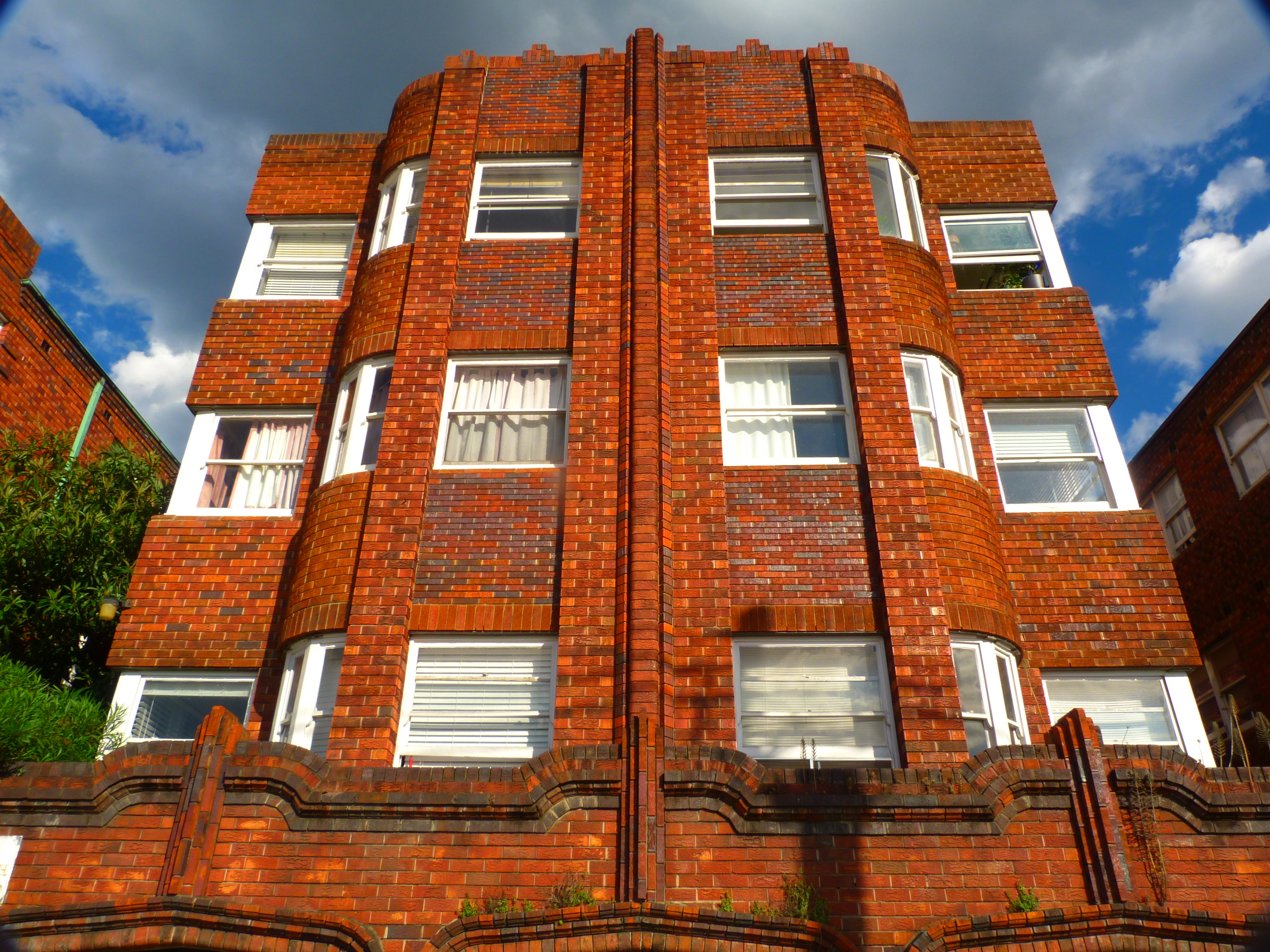
Art Deco flats, Bondi Junction
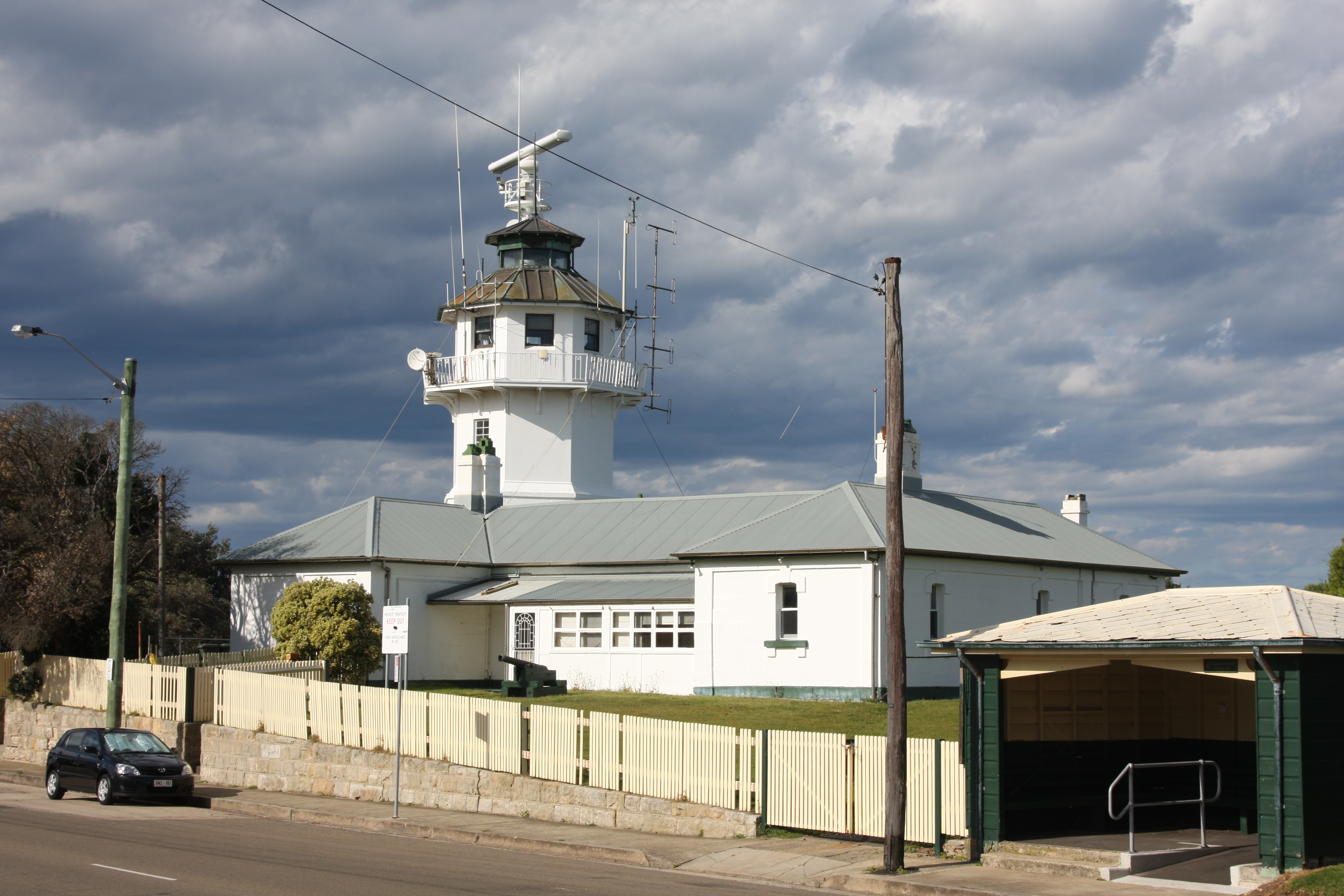
Signal Station

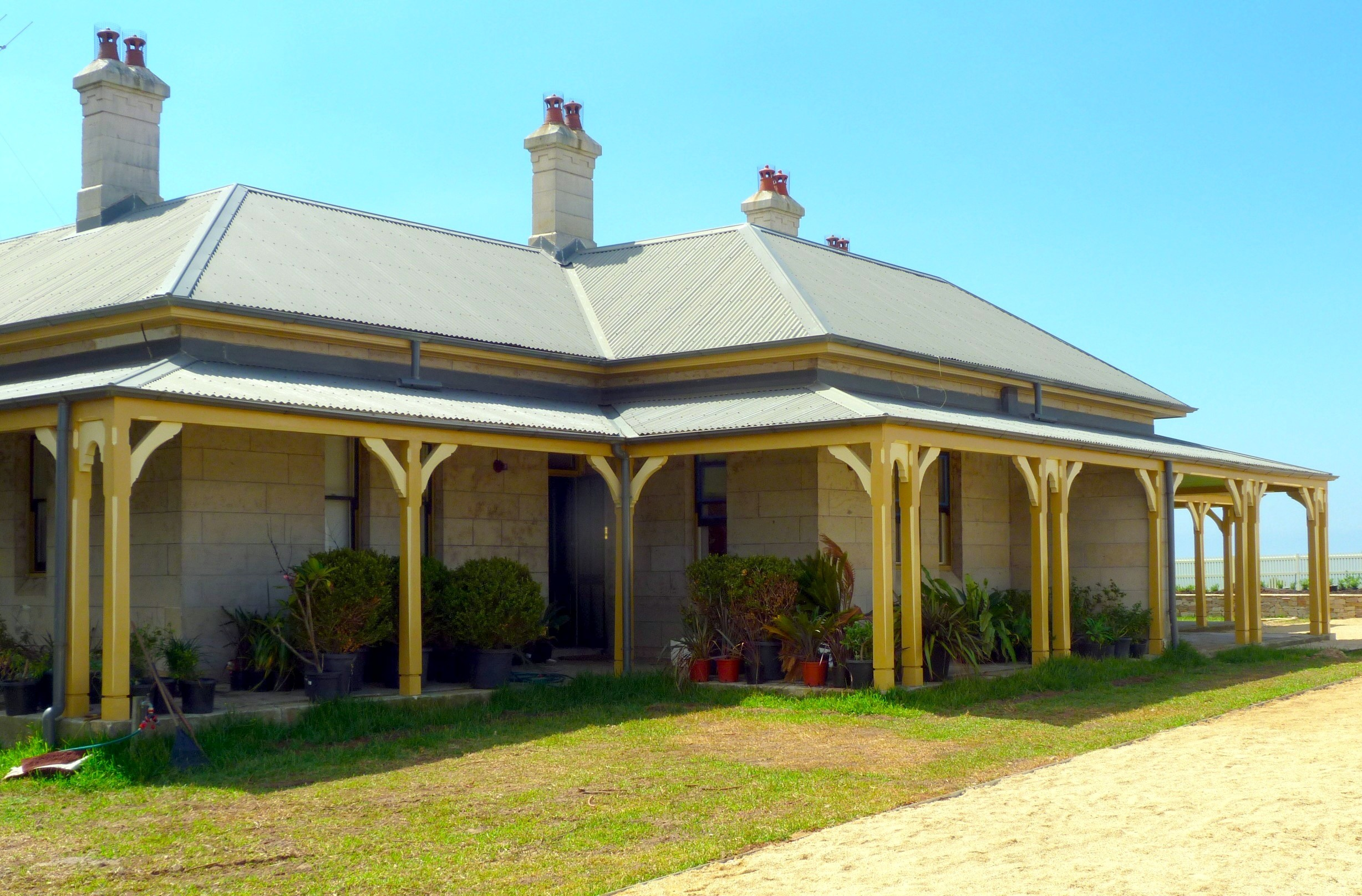
Lighthouse keeper's cottage

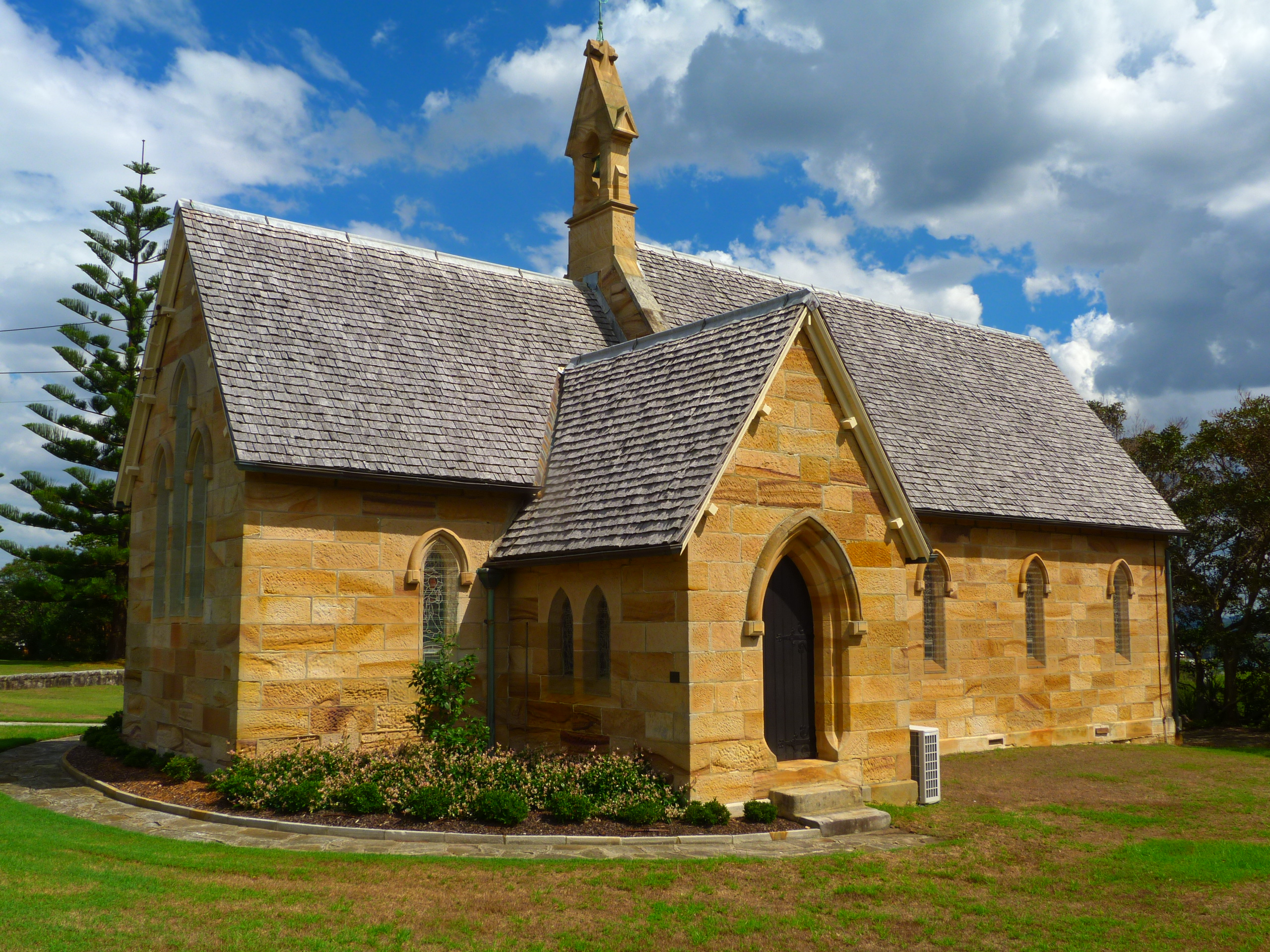
St Peter's Anglican Church, Watsons Bay

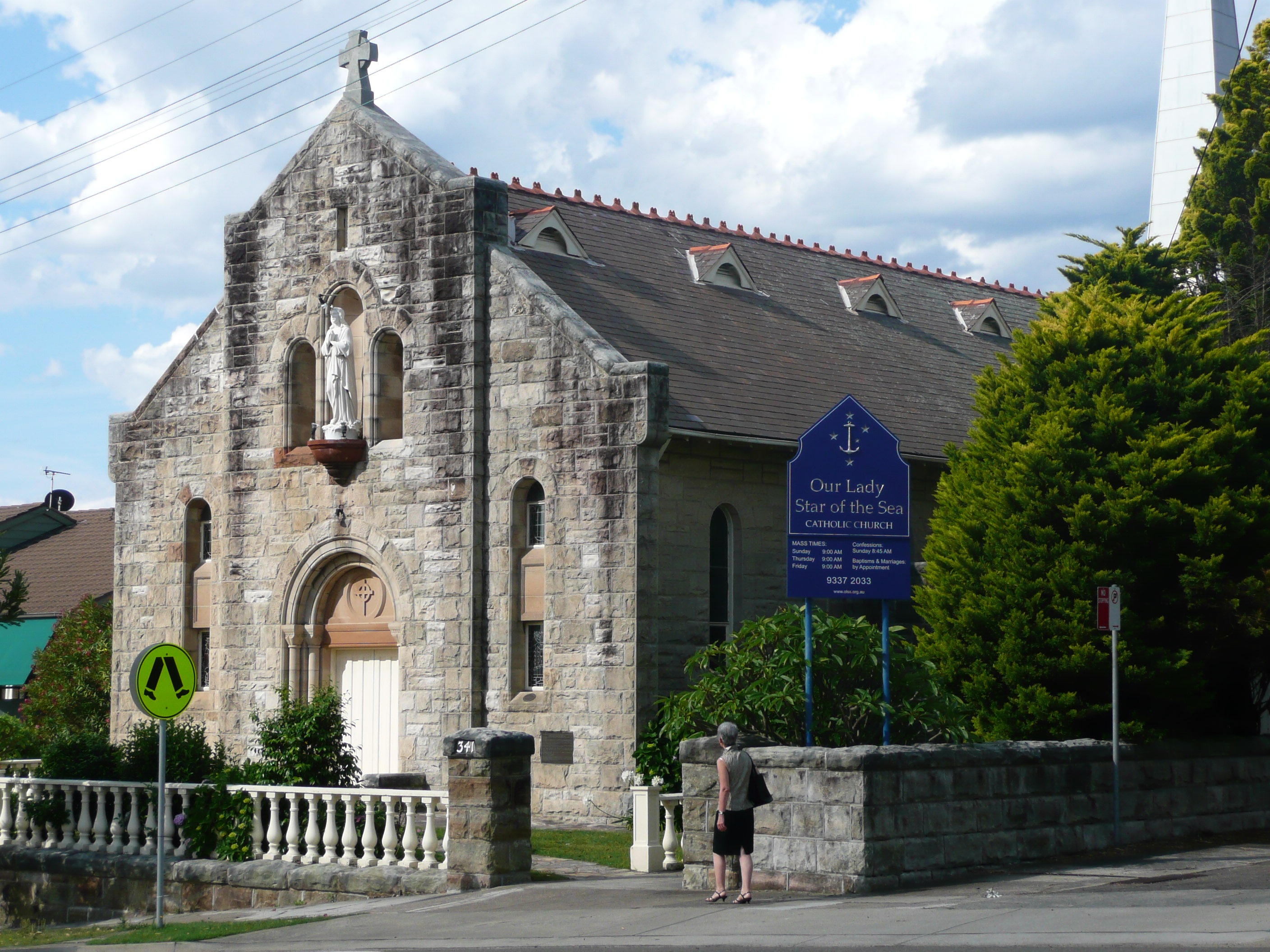
Our Lady Star of the Sea Catholic Church, Watsons Bay

== Major intersections ==
LGA	Location	km	mi	Destinations	Notes
Woollahra–Waverley boundary	Bondi Junction–Woollahra boundary	0.0	0.0	Oxford Street (southwest) – Bondi Junction, Paddington	Southern terminus of road
Woollahra–Waverley boundary	Bondi Junction–Woollahra boundary	0.0	0.0	Syd Einfeld Drive (west) – Woollahra, Paddington; Bondi Road (southeast) – Bondi	
Woollahra–Waverley boundary	Bondi Junction–Bellevue Hill boundary	0.5	0.31	Victoria Street – Double Bay	
Woollahra–Waverley boundary	Bellevue Hill–Rose Bay–Bondi Beach–North Bondi quadripoint	1.6	0.99	O'Sullivan Road (west) – Rose Bay; Curlewis Street (east) – Bondi Beach	
Woollahra–Waverley boundary	Vaucluse	4.4	2.7	Military Road – Dover Heights	
Woollahra–Waverley boundary	Vaucluse	5.1	3.2	New South Head Road – Kings Cross, Double Bay, Rose Bay	Roundabout
Woollahra	Watsons Bay	6.8	4.2	Robertson Place – Watsons Bay	Northern terminus of road at roundabout
Route transition
