= Royal Hotel, Bondi =

Hotel in Bondi, Australia

Royal Hotel
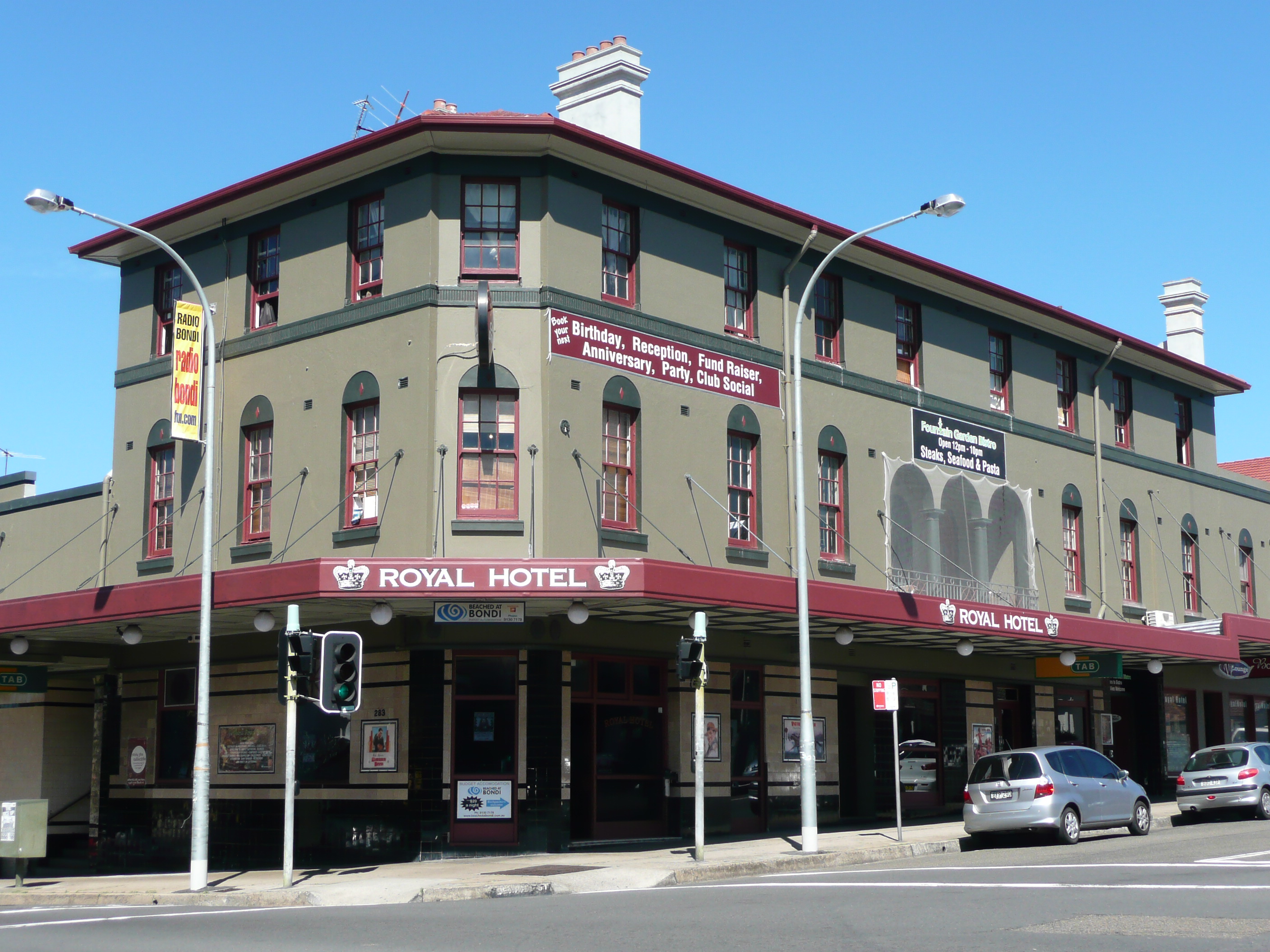
- The building in 2010

General information
- Type: Hotel
- Location: Bondi, New South Wales, 283 Bondi Road, Australia
- Coordinates: 33°53′42″S 151°16′07″E
- Completed: 1902 (124 years ago)

Technical details
- Floor count: 3

The Royal Hotel (also known as the Royal Bondi) is a hotel in Bondi, New South Wales, Australia. Located on the corner of Bondi Road and Denham Street, the hotel was completed in 1902.

In February 1907, the Bondi Surf Bathers' Life Saving Club was formed at a meeting in the hotel. It is now the oldest surf life-saving club in the world.

In 2017, the hotel was put up for sale by its publican Geoff Moulding, who had worked at the establishment for forty years. His father, Albert, purchased the brewery lease in 1978 and the freehold in 1990. It was expected to sell for around AU$ 30 million. The hotel was purchased by Merivale in November 2017.
