= Petersham Reservoir =

Petersham Service Reservoir
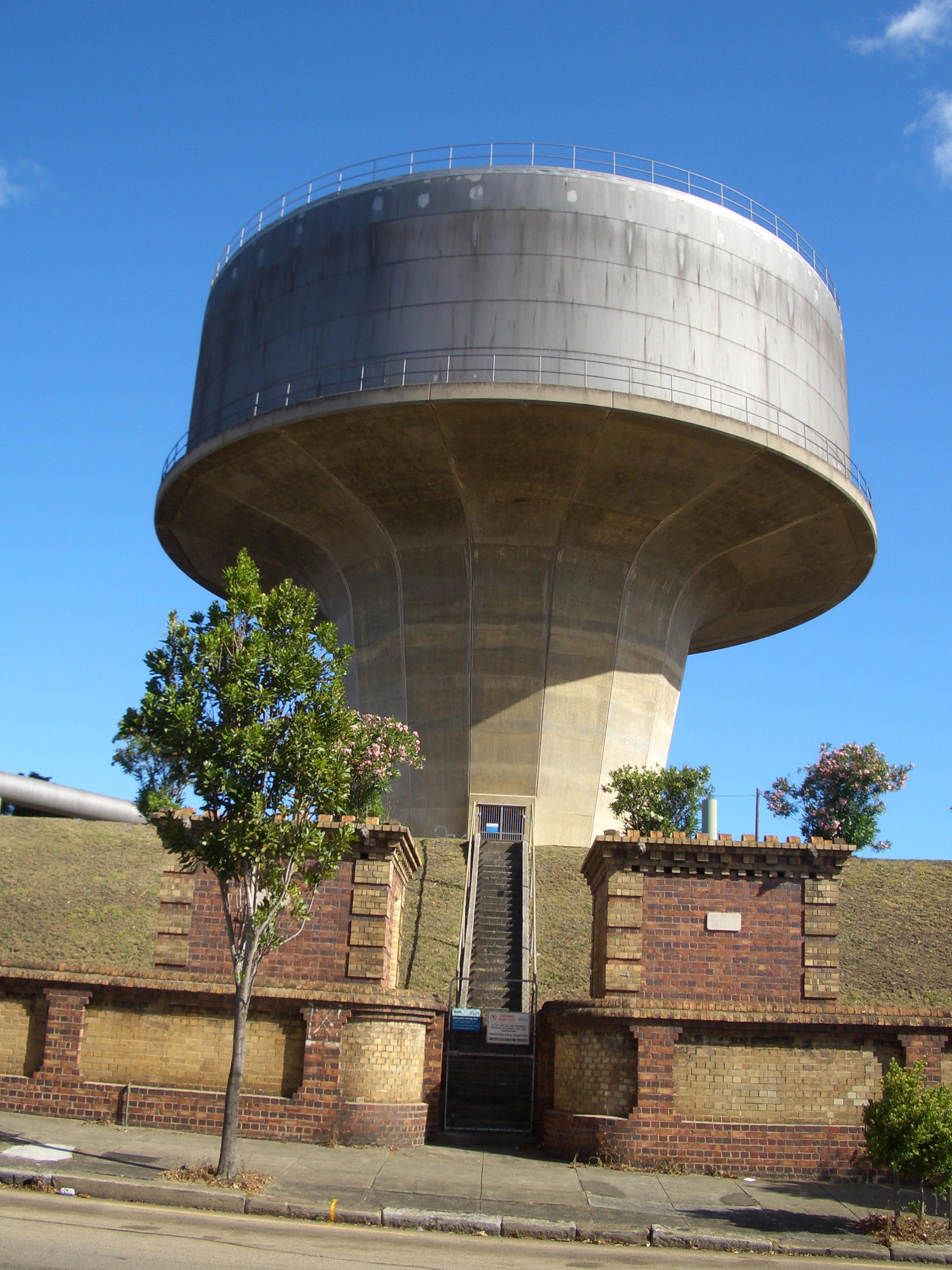
- Petersham Reservoir in 2006. The original, heritage-listed structure is located within the covered mound; the more recent elevated structure is not heritage-listed.

- Location within Sydney
- 33.8962°S 151.1558°E
- Location: New Canterbury Road, Petersham, Inner West Council, Sydney, New South Wales, Australia

Site notes
- Architect: NSW Public Works Dept.
- Owner: Sydney Water

New South Wales Heritage Register
- Official name: Petersham Service Reservoir & Site; Petersham Reservoir WS089
- Type: state heritage (built)
- Designated: 18 November 1999
- Reference no.: 1331
- Type: Water Supply Reservoir/ Dam
- Category: Utilities - Water
- Builders: NSW Public Works Dept.

Petersham Reservoir is a heritage-listed water reservoir at New Canterbury Road, Petersham, Inner West Council, Sydney New South Wales, Australia. It was designed and built by the New South Wales Public Works Department. It is also known as Petersham Service Reservoir and WS089. The property is owned by Sydney Water. It was added to the New South Wales State Heritage Register on 18 November 1999.

== History ==
Petersham Reservoir (covered) (WS 89) was commissioned in 1888 and was the first of the new reservoirs to come on line since the commissioning of the Upper Nepean Scheme in 1888. It initially supplied western Sydney and Illawarra suburbs, but with the amplification of storage in its former area of supply, it recently supplied only the low lying local areas. In 1888 a single main (No. 1 Main) delivered water from Potts Hill by gravitation to Petersham Reservoir (1888) and continued on to Crown Street Reservoir (1859). In 1935–1936, the southern system of supply mains needed major adjustment to use water from the Pressure Tunnel, including an offtake to Petersham Reservoir.

In 1965, the City Tunnel supplied Petersham Reservoir (elevated) (WS 204). Petersham Reservoir (elevated) was constructed in 1965. It was integrated into the structure of the covered reservoir beneath, replacing the central portion of its roof. It enabled supply to the higher parts of the Inner West. Petersham Reservoir (covered) is now empty.

== Description ==
Petersham Reservoir (covered) is a covered reservoir, with fill placed over its roof and grassed over. The enclosing mound is rectangular in shape, though the reservoir beneath is circular, partly excavated and partly raised in embankment. The reservoir is built with brick floor, walls and columns with cast iron beams. The roof comprises three concentric concrete barrel arches, and is similar in design to Waverley Reservoir No. 1 (Covered) . These are the only two reservoirs which possess this roof design, although the central arch has been removed by the construction of Petersham Reservoir (elevated) in 1965. Access to the reservoir is now through the tower of Petersham Reservoir (elevated). The site is surrounded by a polychrome brick wall, with the main entrance to the grounds from Canterbury Road. The entrance is flanked by two rectangular brick valve houses, each containing original valve control gear, as also found at Pymble Reservoir No. 2 (Covered) (WS 98). The reservoir also has cast iron roof ventilation caps, as at Waverley Reservoir No.1 (Covered), Randwick Reservoir and Pymble Reservoir No.1 (Covered) . Plantings include oleander. It has a full service level of 51 metres (167 ft) and a capacity of 9.1 megalitres (320×10^{3} cu ft).

A former Water Service Operator Office is located on the Canterbury Road frontage. It is a brick building, with hipped tile roof, Federation in style. The curtilage includes the covered reservoir, the brick wall, WSO cottage, valve houses and gates.

The construction of Petersham Reservoir (Elevated) in 1965 caused alteration to the central portion of the roof structure.

== Heritage listing ==
Petersham Reservoir (Covered) demonstrates the high level of engineering skill available for the construction of late 19th century covered reservoirs. It belongs to a small group of covered reservoirs (Crown Street Reservoir (1859), Paddington Reservoir (1864), Woollahra Reservoir (1880), Waverley Reservoir No. 1 (1887), and the Centennial Park Reservoir No. 1), which together exhibit the changing technology used in construction. Petersham Reservoir (Covered) was the first reservoir to be commissioned after the completion of the Upper Nepean Scheme in 1888. The valve houses still contain the original switch gear, which is very unusual in the Sydney Water system.

Petersham Service Reservoir was listed on the New South Wales State Heritage Register on 18 November 1999 having satisfied the following criteria.

The place is important in demonstrating the course, or pattern, of cultural or natural history in New South Wales.

Petersham Reservoir (Covered) was the first reservoir to be commissioned after the completion of the Upper Nepean Scheme in 1888.

The place is important in demonstrating aesthetic characteristics and/or a high degree of creative or technical achievement in New South Wales.

Architectural detailing (polychrome brick walling and location of valve houses on either side of gate) demonstrates excellence in design, fitting in with the surrounding streetscape.

The place has potential to yield information that will contribute to an understanding of the cultural or natural history of New South Wales.

This reservoir demonstrates the broad range of construction techniques and high level of technical expertise available for covered reservoir construction. All covered reservoirs are highly significant within the SWC system, since all differ in construction technology, design and architectural detailing. All, therefore, contribute to our understanding of the development of covered reservoirs in NSW.

The place possesses uncommon, rare or endangered aspects of the cultural or natural history of New South Wales.

One of a small group of large covered reservoirs in brick or concrete, each demonstrating differences in construction, design and architectural detailing. The first reservoir to be commissioned after the completion of the Upper nepean Scheme in 1888.
