= Crown Street Reservoir =

Heritage place in Sydney, New South Wales, Australia

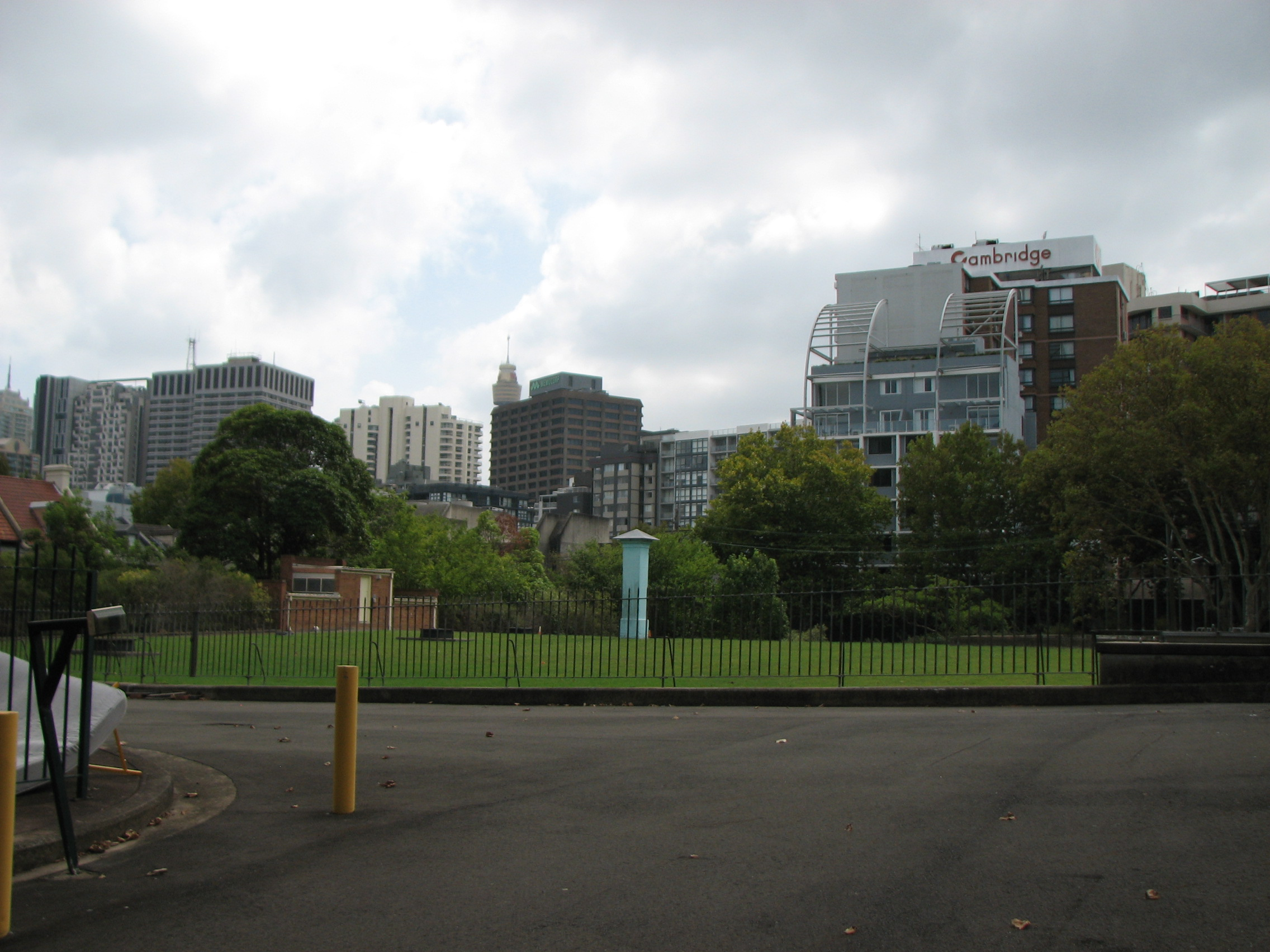
- Covered reservoir (below ground) showing blue ventillation shaft – from Reservoir Street

- Location within Sydney Location within Australia
- 33°52′52″S 151°12′51″E
- Location: 285 Crown Street, Surry Hills, City of Sydney, New South Wales, Australia

History
- Built: 1859

Site notes
- Owner: Sydney Water

New South Wales Heritage Register
- Official name: Crown Street Reservoir & Site; WS 0034
- Type: State heritage (built)
- Designated: 18 November 1999
- Reference no.: 1323
- Type: Water Supply Reservoir/ Dam
- Category: Utilities – Water
- Builders: Donohoe and Vaughan

The Crown Street Reservoir is a heritage-listed reservoir located at 285 Crown Street, Surry Hills, City of Sydney, New South Wales, Australia. It was built by Donohoe and Vaughan. It is also known as Crown Street Reservoir & Site and WS 0034. The property is owned by Sydney Water, an agency of the Government of New South Wales. It was added to the New South Wales State Heritage Register on 18 November 1999.

== History ==
The Crown Street Reservoir (WS 34) was completed in 1859. Waterproof bricks, imported from England, were used in its construction. It was a part of the Botany Swamps Scheme, 1858–1886. Water was pumped from Botany Pumping Station to Crown Street Reservoir, and later to Paddington Reservoir (1864). It is now possibly the oldest working reservoir in Australia. The Botany Swamps gave way to the Upper Nepean Scheme in 1888, with temporary supply provided by the Hudson Scheme between 1886 and 1888. Today the Crown Street Reservoir receives water from the Upper Nepean Scheme and also Warragamba Dam. It is an important and integral part reticulation system.

== Description ==
The Crown Street Reservoir (WS 34) is a rectangular covered reservoir. The reservoir is built with brick perimeter walls, partly excavated into bedrock and partly raised and supported by an earth embankment. Special impervious bricks, 300,000 in all, were imported from England for the purpose. On the Riley Street frontage of the reservoir is a modern brick valve house or entrance chamber, with concrete roof and footings. The construction of the reservoir reflects the ingenuity of the designers and craftsmen of the time. It has required little maintenance and repair over the years. Its original cost was A£14,929.

Crown Street Reservoir provided the suction water for Crown Street Pumping Station (WPS 1) which has supplied the following reservoir at various times: Paddington Reservoir, 1864, now disused; Woollahra Reservoir, 1880; Centennial Park Reservoir No. 1, 1899; Centennial Park Reservoir No. 2, 1925; Waverley Reservoir No. 1, 1887; Waverley reservoir No. 2, 1917; and Waverley Reservoir No. 3, 1938.

The land adjacent to the reservoir provides space for a number of buildings, including WPS 1, former workshop buildings, and two other modern buildings. The whole site is surrounded by a substantial and early sandstone, brick and wrought iron palisade fence. The workshop building is a two-storey polychrome (red and white) brick structure, on the Reservoir Street frontage. Its original roof has been replaced by a skillion corrugated iron roof, and many other alterations are evident. The workshop building is now disused and unoccupied.

=== Modifications and dates ===
It has received regular maintenance and repair over the years.

== Heritage listing ==
As at 5 August 2009, Crown Street Reservoir (WS 34) is the oldest reservoir in NSW, still in service. It has had a pivotal role, not only in the Botany Swamps Scheme, 1858–1886, but also in the Hudson / Upper Nepean Scheme, 1886 / 1888 onwards, and now receives water from Warragamba Dam. It continues to supply water to the Inner City, a role it has played since 1859.The construction of the reservoir exemplifies the skill and ingenuity of the designers and craftsmen of the time, and as a result Crown Street Reservoir (WS 34) possesses historical and aesthetic significance at least at a state level. All covered reservoirs are highly significant within the SWC system, since all differ in construction technology, design and architectural detailing. All therefore contribute to our understanding of the development of covered reservoirs in NSW.

Crown Street Reservoir was listed on the New South Wales State Heritage Register on 18 November 1999 having satisfied the following criteria.

The place is important in demonstrating the course, or pattern, of cultural or natural history in New South Wales.

Crown Street Reservoir (WS 34) is the oldest working reservoir in NSW, still in service. It has had a pivotal role, not only in the Botany Swamps Scheme, 1858–1886, but also in the Hudson / Upper Nepean Scheme, 1886 / 1888 onwards, and now receives water from Warragamba Dam. It continues to supply water to the Inner City, a role it has played since 1859, a total of 141 years to date. This reservoir is associated with a water supply source, prior to the completion of the Upper Nepean Scheme and the formation of the Metropolitan Water Sewerage & Drainage Board in 1888. It operated in parallel with Busby's Bore from 1859 to 1888.

The place is important in demonstrating aesthetic characteristics and/or a high degree of creative or technical achievement in New South Wales.

The Reservoir structure features high aesthetic qualities, demonstrative of construction techniques and high level technical expertise available for covered reservoir construction in Australia in the 1850s, including cast-iron beams imported from England.

The place has potential to yield information that will contribute to an understanding of the cultural or natural history of New South Wales.

The Crown Street Reservoir is an early example of a mid-nineteenth century fire-proof jack-arch roof construction in NSW. It is the only reservoir in the SWC system featuring wooden columns. The reservoir was built in special impervious bricks imported from England, which is an unusual feature. The Crown Street Reservoir site possibly contains remnant sections of the 30-inch Botany Swamps rising main, manufactured in Scotland in the 1850s.

The place possesses uncommon, rare or endangered aspects of the cultural or natural history of New South Wales.

One of small group of covered reservoirs, each demonstrating differences in construction, design & architectural detailing. Earliest reservoir, still in use. 1 of 4 associated with Botany Swamps Supply. Only reservoir with wooden columns in SWC system.

The place is important in demonstrating the principal characteristics of a class of cultural or natural places/environments in New South Wales.

Crown Street Reservoir is representative of the oldest class of fully built water reservoirs in NSW and Australia, identifiable by their brick structure and brick arched roof. It is the oldest, the longest serving and probably the most important of this group. The Crown Street Reservoir site contains a 1965 water pumping station representative of design and equipment of other major water pumping stations on Sydney in the 1960s.

== Engineering heritage ==
The reservoir received an Engineering Heritage National Marker from Engineers Australia as part of its Engineering Heritage Recognition Program.

== See also ==
- List of reservoirs and dams in New South Wales
- Sydney Water
