= Waverley Reservoirs =

- Interactive map of the Waverley Reservoirs area

General information
- Completed: 1887, 1917, 1938
- Owner: Sydney Water
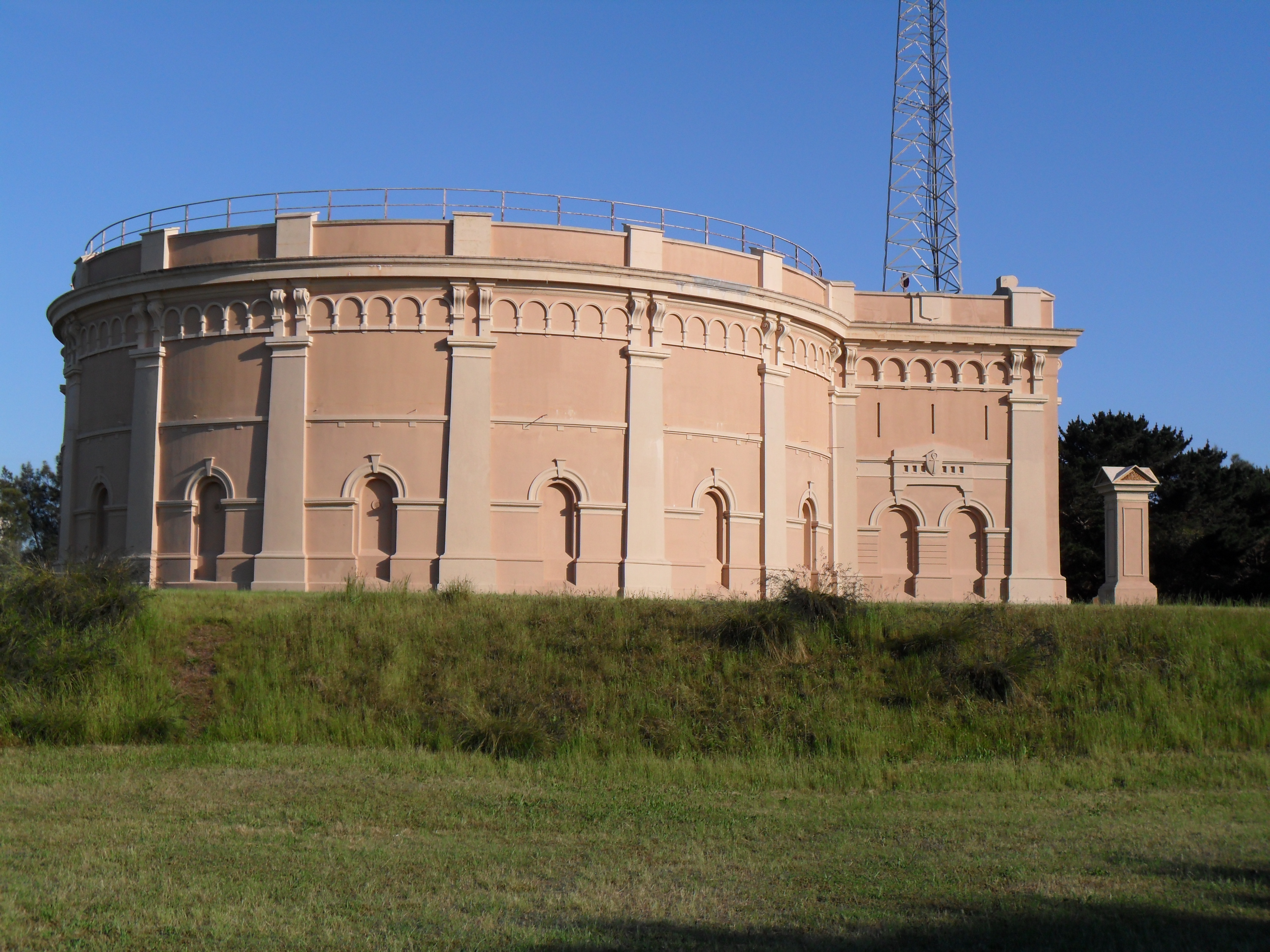
- Interactive map of Waverley Reservoirs

Dam and spillways
- Dam volume: 1,087,000 gallons 4,260,000 gallons 17,500,000 gallons 500,000
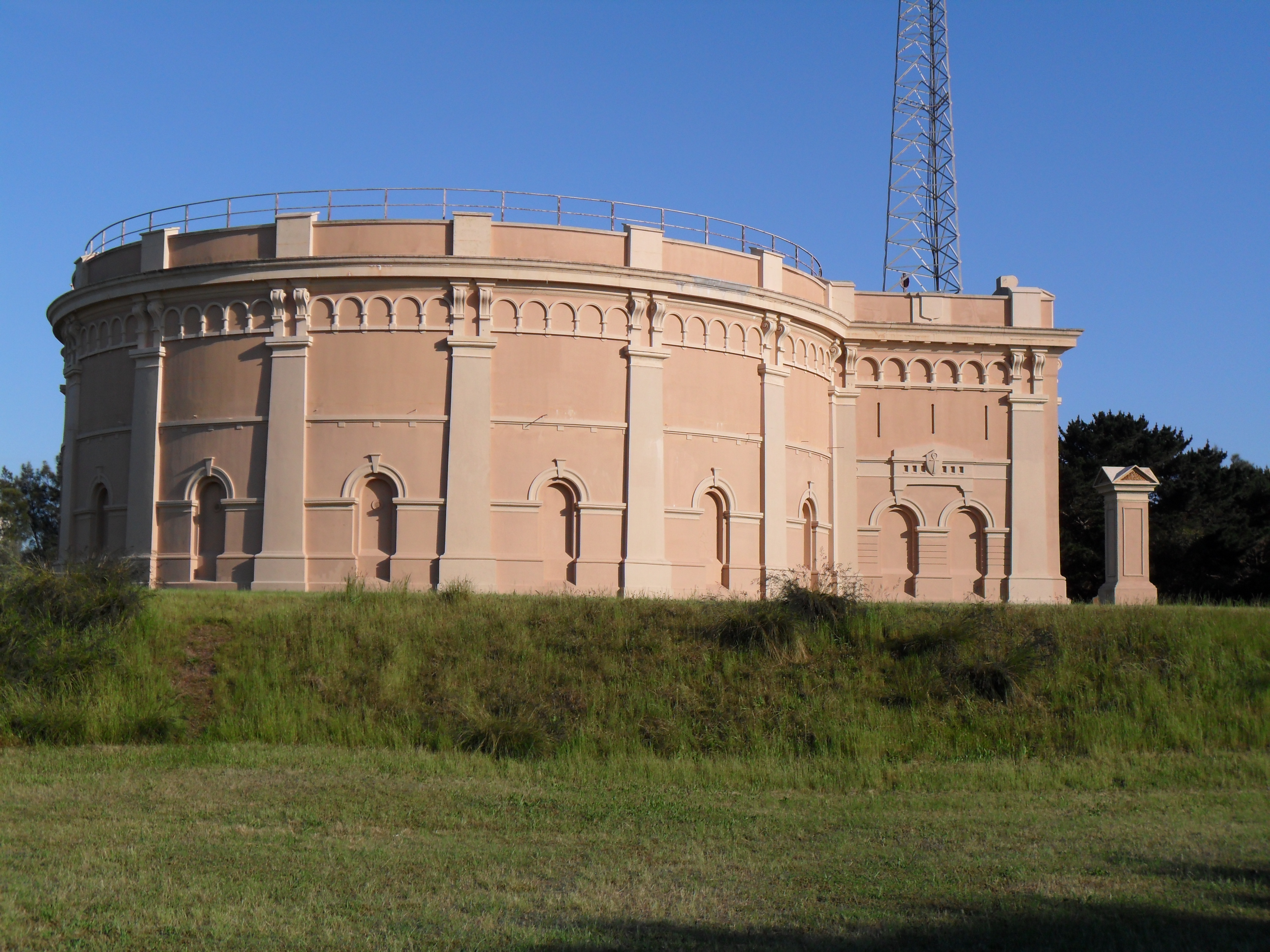
- One of the four reservoirs, located adjacent to Paul Street, Waverley

- Location within Sydney
- 33°53′41″S 151°15′23″E
- Location: Paul Street, Bondi Junction, New South Wales, Australia

History
- Built: 1887

Site notes
- Architect: Public Works Department
- Owner: Sydney Water

New South Wales Heritage Register
- Official name: Waverley Reservoir No.1 (WS 0132); WS132; Waverley Reservoir (Elevated) (WS 0136); WS 0136
- Type: State heritage (built)
- Designated: 1. 18 November 1999; 2. 15 November 2002
- Reference no.: 1. 1353; 2. 1646
- Type: Water Supply Reservoirs / Dam
- Category: Utilities – Water
- Builders: Public Works Department

The Waverley Reservoirs are four reservoirs, of which two are heritage-listed, located at Paul Street, Bondi Junction, New South Wales, Australia. They were designed and built by the Public Works Department. The property is owned by Sydney Water.

== History ==
Waverley Reservoir No. 1, completed in 1887, was the last of four reservoirs built to augment the Botany Swamps Scheme (1858–1886). and 15 November 2002 respectively. The other three reservoirs included:

- Crown Street Reservoir, 1859
- Paddington Reservoir, 1864 (disused and no longer owned by Sydney Water), and
- Woollahra Reservoir, 1880.

However Waverley Reservoir No. 1 was not supplied solely by Botany Swamps Water, because by 1886 the Hudson Scheme had come on line, supplying water from the Upper Nepean, prior to the completion of that Scheme in 1888. Water was pumped from Woollahra Reservoir for the first six years of its service, then from Crown Street Reservoir in 1893. From 1927 onwards Waterloo Pumping Station took over supply of the reservoir. The Waverley Reservoirs were the highest of the reservoirs intended to be supplied by Botany Swamps. However it soon became apparent that additional height was required for reticulation purposes. This led to the construction of two elevated steel tanks in 1894 (now demolished). With increasing demand, these tanks were eventually superseded by the present Waverley Reservoir (Elevated) and Waverley Reservoir No. 2, both completed in 1917. Final augmentation of supply took place in 1938 with the construction of Waverley Reservoir No. 3.

The group of four reservoirs not only supply the Eastern Suburbs by gravitation, but also supply Bellevue Hill by pumping station. The Waverley Reservoir Group not only demonstrates the dramatic increase in demand from 1887 through to 1938, but also the progression and development of reservoir construction techniques, rarely seen on any other Sydney Water site.

== Description ==
=== Waverley Reservoir No. 1 ===
Waverley Reservoir No. 1 is a circular concrete covered reservoir. It has a concrete floor and walls, though from the surface the upper part of the walls appear to be constructed of brick with a sandstone coping. The roof is covered with fill and grassed over. The cast iron ventilation caps and access chamber cover form a single line across the diameter of the roof and have given the reservoir its nickname of Stonehenge. The cast iron ventilation caps are used on a number of other reservoirs, including Randwick Reservoir and Petersham Reservoir.

=== Waverley Reservoir (Elevated) ===
Waverley Reservoir (Elevated) is a reinforced concrete reservoir, with ornate and decorative sides. It is constructed over the roof of Waverley Reservoir No. 2, with the roof support columns of the covered reservoir also supporting the sides and base of the elevated reservoir. Both reservoirs were built together in an integrated and innovative fashion. The elevated reservoir has an unusual feature, namely an attached rectangular antechamber or valve house, with its exterior walls decorated in a similar fashion to the circular reservoir. The decorative features include pilasters framing panels with blocked and arched false windows. Above the entrance doorway is a shield with gothic script, Sanitas est vita, and above that the following inscription "ERECTED / BY THE / METROPOLITAN BOARD OF WATER SUPPLY / AND SEWERAGE SYDNEY / 1918 AD".

The reservoir's full service level is 121 metres (397 ft), with a capacity of 2.3 megalitres (81×10^{3} cu ft). During the 1960s-1970s, the reservoir was roofed to safeguard water quality. The reservoir is in service and is in good condition.

== Heritage listing ==
As at 9 June 2005, the group of four reservoirs at Waverley demonstrates the progressive development of different construction techniques for reservoirs, the rapid growth of demand in the Sydney suburbs, and the need for greater elevation in order to connect reticulation mains to the higher suburban areas. Waverley Reservoir No.1 (covered) is the last of four reservoirs, three of which are still in service and owned by Sydney Water, associated with the Botany Swamps Scheme, 1858–1886. All covered reservoirs are highly significant within the Sydney Water system, since all differ in construction technology, design and architectural detailing. All therefore contribute to our understanding of the development of covered reservoirs in NSW.

=== Waverley Reservoir No.1 ===
Waverley Reservoir No.1 was listed on the New South Wales State Heritage Register on 18 November 1999 having satisfied the following criteria.

The place is important in demonstrating the course, or pattern, of cultural or natural history in New South Wales.

Waverley Reservoir No.1 (covered) is the last of three reservoirs, still in service, associated with the Botany Swamps Scheme, 1858–1886. This reservoir and site demonstrates particularly well the amplification in demand due to growing population.

The place is important in demonstrating aesthetic characteristics and/or a high degree of creative or technical achievement in New South Wales.

The recreational and open space usage of the roof of the reservoir is a historical and important feature of this and most other covered reservoirs.

The place has potential to yield information that will contribute to an understanding of the cultural or natural history of New South Wales.

The group of four reservoirs at Waverley demonstrates the progressive development of different construction techniques for reservoir and the need for greater elevation in order to connect reticulation mains to the higher suburban areas. All covered reservoirs are highly significant within the Sydney Water system, since all differ in construction technology, design and architectural detailing. All therefore contribute to our understanding of the development of covered reservoirs in NSW.

The place possesses uncommon, rare or endangered aspects of the cultural or natural history of New South Wales.

One of a small group of large covered reservoirs in brick or concrete in the Sydney Water system, each demonstrating differences in construction, design and architectural detailing. It is one of only four reservoirs associated with the Botany Swamps Supply.

=== Elevated reservoir ===
Waverley Reservoir (elevated) is one of the most ornate and decorative of the reinforced concrete reservoirs, either elevated or surface, in the Sydney Water system. The construction of the elevated over the covered reservoir indicates the high level of engineering expertise available in the MWS&DB; in the early 20th century.

Waverley Reservoir was listed on the New South Wales State Heritage Register on 15 November 2002 having satisfied the following criteria.

The place is important in demonstrating the course, or pattern, of cultural or natural history in New South Wales.

This reservoir and site demonstrates particularly well the amplification in demand due to growing population.

The place is important in demonstrating aesthetic characteristics and/or a high degree of creative or technical achievement in New South Wales.

Waverley Reservoir (elevated) is one of the most ornate and decorative of the reinforced concrete reservoirs, either elevated or surface. The construction of the elevated over the covered reservoir indicates the high level of engineering expertise available in the MWS&DB; in the early 20th century.

The place has potential to yield information that will contribute to an understanding of the cultural or natural history of New South Wales.

The group of four reservoirs at Waverley demonstrates the progressive development of different construction techniques for reservoirs and the need for greater elevation in order to connect reticulation mains to the higher suburban areas.

The place possesses uncommon, rare or endangered aspects of the cultural or natural history of New South Wales.

One of a small group of elevated concrete reservoirs on a concrete pier stand in the Sydney Water system. One of only two sites in the Sydney Water Supply System where the structure of one reservoir is integrated with another using innovative technology.

== See also ==
- Bankstown Reservoir
- Balmain Reservoir
- Paddington Reservoir
