= Paddington Reservoir =

Public park in Sydney, Australia

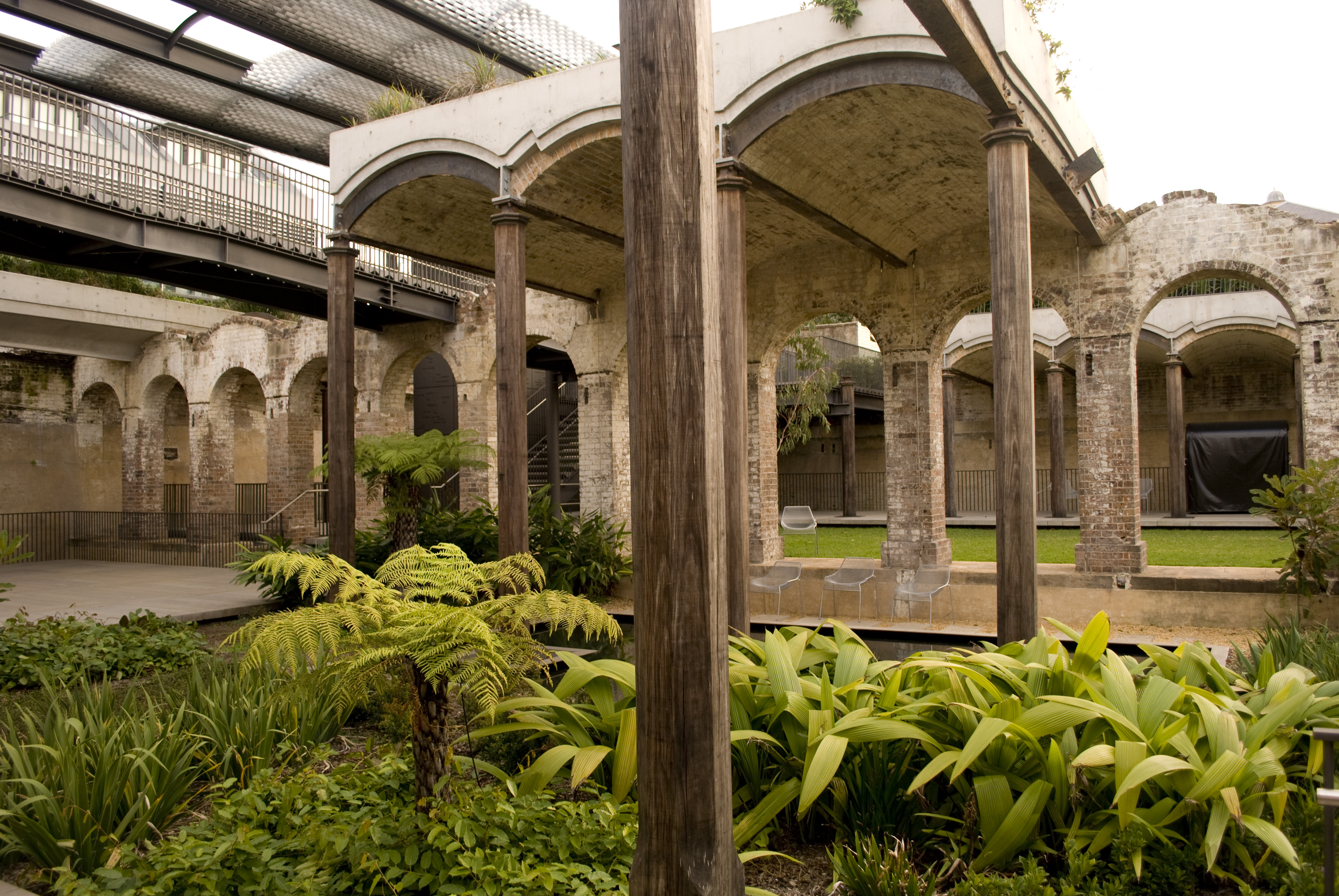
- Western Chamber, Paddington Reservoir Gardens, pictured in 2010
- Interactive map of Paddington Reservoir
- Type: Urban park
- Location: 255a Oxford Street, Paddington, New South Wales, Australia
- Coordinates: 33°53′07″S 151°13′37″E
- Created: 2008 (as an urban park)
- Operator: City of Sydney
- Open: 24 hours
- Status: Open all year

History
- Built: 1864 – March 1866 (as a water reservoir)
- Built for: Metropolitan Board of Water and Sewerage, Sydney

Site notes
- Elevation: 65 metres (214 ft) AHD
- Architect: Edward Bell
- Restored by: Tonkin Zulaikha Greer

New South Wales Heritage Register
- Official name: Paddington Reservoir; Walter Read Reserve; Paddington Reservoir Gardens (2009+); Reservoir Gardens
- Type: State heritage (built)
- Designated: 2 April 1999
- Reference no.: 515
- Type: Water Supply Reservoir/Dam
- Category: Utilities – Water

The Paddington Reservoir is a heritage-listed public park located at 255a Oxford Street in the inner eastern Sydney suburb of Paddington. It was designed by Edward Bell and built from 1864 to 1866 and operated as a water reservoir which accepted water from the Botany Swamps pumping station for supply to parts of Sydney between 1866 and 1899. In the twentieth century the site variously functioned as a service station and storage and mechanical workshop site. In 2006 work commenced to convert the site into a sunken garden and park. It is also known as Walter Read Reserve; Paddington Reservoir Gardens; Reservoir Gardens. The property is owned by City of Sydney. It was added to the New South Wales State Heritage Register on 2 April 1999.

== History ==
=== History of the area ===
This suburb, which took its name from the London borough, lies in what were once paddocks adjacent to Victoria Barracks. It was the first of the early Sydney suburbs that was not self-sufficient – its inhabitants, unlike those of Balmain or Newtown, where work was available in local industries, had to go away each day to their places of employment. Development of the eastern suburbs of Edgecliff, Double Bay, Point Piper and Woollahra surrounded this area with wealthy people's homes so this small hilly suburb lost all hope of harbour views.

The area developed after a road was constructed to link up with a pilot station that was to be built at Watsons Bay (Old South Head Road). John Palmer, the settlement's commissary, refused to allow people to cross his land grant ('Woolloomooloo'), so the road had to follow a roundabout way through Paddington to bypass his 40 hectares (100 acres). Only a handful of workers lived in the area, and it was not until 1838, when it was decided to build a new military barracks in Paddington, that life came to the area.

From 1848 when Victoria Barracks had been opened (designed by Lt.-Col. George Barney) and homes for the soldiers and their families had been erected, Paddington began to assume a real identity. The (barracks site) land was sandy – in fact a huge sandhill was located on the western side of the Greens Road area, and the foundation trenches had to be dug very deep, to locate firm stone for the foundations. Stone was mostly quarried in the area: the stonemasons were free settlers who had worked on erection of the Customs House at Circular Quay.

Once the soldiers and their families moved here, shopkeepers followed. Builders moved into the area and put up 3,800 houses between 1860 and 1890. These terraces give today's Paddington its air of individuality. The first school in the area was opened in the Presbyterian manse in Oxford Street, built in 1845.

It is hard to imagine that in 1822 the mansion Juniper Hall (the opposite southern corner of Oxford Street from the Reservoir site) stood alone, without the many neighbours it has today. Set in a flagged garden, it had attic windows that gave panoramic views to Rushcutters Bay and Botany Bay. Juniper Hall was built for Robert Cooper, distiller and emancipist merchant, who with partners James Underwood and Francis Ewen Forbes, had received 40 hectares (100 acres) from Governor Brisbane in c. 1818, covering the whole of north Paddington, and they agreed to erect 3 mansions and a distillery there. A distillery was built at the foot of Cascade Street near Taylor Square and Cooper bought out his partners, and only Juniper Hall was erected. The Coopers were part of the social scene of their day and entertained many notables of that time. After they left the house it was renamed Ormond House to dissociate itself from the gin image and passed through many hands, gradually becoming smothered by the building of small shops in front of the house. Latterly it has been restored by the National Trust and has had a variety of uses.

Today few of the area's original working class residents remain, as the suburb's proximity to the city has made it popular with business and professional people who prefer inner-city living in this historic area. The shopping centre, concentrated on the north side of Oxford Street, has also changed from one serving local needs to one of cafes, speciality shops and boutiques. Much of this is related to the changing population and the Village Bazaar, or Paddington Markets. The bazaar, which has operated since the mid-1970s, draws visitors from all over the city and has contributed to Paddington's development as one of Sydney's favourite tourist spots, along with Bondi Beach and The Rocks.

=== The reservoir ===
==== Construction and operation ====
The plan for Paddington Reservoir began with the creation of the Botany Swamps water scheme in 1859. This water scheme, developed by Edward Bell and Will Wadsworth proposed a number of reservoirs at critical points around the city. Construction of the Paddington Reservoir was completed by 1866 and connected to the Botany Swamps pumping station. This offered a new source of water to elevated suburbs of Sydney which had up until then had only been serviced by wells and a water-cart service.

The original reservoir was built in two stages: the western chamber in 1866 and the eastern chamber in 1878. Each measured approximately 33 by 31 metres (108 by 102 ft). However, due to its limited elevation, only the top two metres (five feet) of water from the reservoir could be provided to buildings in excess of one storey. In order to reduce the load on the Botany Swamps pumping station, a further pumping station at the Crown Street Reservoir was commenced in 1875 which also assisted in the delivery of water to the Paddington Reservoir.

In 1877 a second chamber was added to the Paddington Reservoir, dubbed the eastern chamber (with the original chamber being the western chamber) this increased the storage of the facility to meet the demands of the rapidly expanding city. In 1899 the facility was decommissioned following the completion of the larger and further elevated Centennial Park Reservoir.

==== Storage and service station ====
The reservoir was decommissioned in 1899, used for storage and garaging for the Sydney Metropolitan Board of Water Supply and Sewerage (Water Board) from 1914, dewatered c. 1920 and used as a mechanical workshop associated with a service station on Oxford Street. Drawings held by the Council of South Sydney show modifications to the structure in 1925 to accommodate the removal of a number of internal columns.

The ex-reservoir was sold to Paddington Municipal Council in 1934 for £3,750. The Water Board leased the eastern chamber of the facility and continued to use it for motor vehicle and general storage until the late 1950s. The western chamber was leased to a commercial motor garage operator in 1934 which led to the construction of a ramped entry from Oxford Street into the western chamber. The roof has been used as a grassed public reserve since the 1930s. Seats and steps were built in the mid-1930s and it was then known as Reservoir Gardens. The Walter Read Reserve was established on the roof in 1953. It was named after Walter Farley Read (1894–1955), an alderman and mayor of the Paddington Municipal Council.

The site was classified by the National Trust of Australia (NSW) in 1985 and in that year an interim conservation order was placed over the property. In 1987 a permanent conservation order under the Heritage Act was placed on the site. In July 1990 part of the roof of the western chamber of the former-reservoir, still used as a motor vehicle service station, collapsed. This collapse in 1990 and a further collapse occurred as a result of corrosion of steel structure placed in 1926 to allow vehicle movement in the underground reservoir chambers. This caused the closure of the reserve atop the roof, and the service station below. For some years the site was disused. Council subsequently commissioned structural engineering assessments, a plan of management and a conservation management plan by Tanner Architects.

==== Conservation and adaptive reuse ====
When Tonkin Zulaikha Greer Architects and JMD Design were commissioned in 2006 to convert the reservoir to an urban park, the general expectation was that the site would be capped off and a brand new arrangement be built on top. However the architects were captivated by the possibilities of revealing the 19th century structures as a ruin through which the public could wander, taking in the dramatic spaces. The concept for the project was embodied in the existing artefact. An accessible sunken garden and pond, surrounded by pre-case concrete boardwalk, has been inserted into the conserved ruin of the western chamber. The edges of the ruin are contained by concrete up-stands so as to amplify the distinctive curved original brick vaults. A "Victorian" tree-fern garden hints at the era in which the reservoir was built. The eastern chamber has been conserved with new timber columns and a waterproof concrete structure over, stabilising the brickwork and forming the base for the new landscaped park above. Adaptive reuse of this chamber is part of a future stage of works due to funding limitations. The eastern chamber has limited public access due to level changes and hence is not currently open to the public.

In March 2009 after extensive conservation and adaptive reuse works, Paddington Reservoir Gardens (a new public park) was reopened to the public by the City of Sydney Council. The completed project won a number of awards (2009–2011), including the 2011 Urban Land Institute Award for excellence: Asia-Pacific; the 2010 WAN Urban Design Award; the 2010 International Architecture Award by the Chicago Athenaeum and the European Centre for Architecture, Art, Design and Urban Studies; the 2010 Australian Institute of Architects Awards for both urban design and heritage architecture; the Lloyd Rees Award for Urban Design and the Greenway Award for Heritage (projects), both from AIA, NSW Chapter and the 2010 Energy Australia / National Trust Heritage Award – Adaptive Reuse (Corporate/Government).

== Description ==
The Paddington Reservoir is located on the south western side of the Oxford, Ormond and Oatley streets intersection. It is a large semisubmerged rectangular structure of brick construction supported by timber columns and overlaid by a grassed park. The reservoir was constructed of brick with ironbark columns which were erected in mortises in stone foundations at the base of the reservoir. These columns supported cast iron beams which in-turn supported segmental arches which formed the roof of the structure.

The reservoir was constructed in 1864 and duplicated to the west in 1876. The structure comprises two main chambers measuring approximately 33.4 by 31.2 metres (110 by 102 ft) each. The two chambers are separated by a division wall to enable either of the chambers to be emptied. Within each chamber a second lower masonry wall, with piers over, divides the chamber in half.

Before conservation and adaptation works, it was in semi-ruinous condition.

=== Paddington Reservoir Gardens ===
In 2006 architects Tonkin Zulaikha Greer and landscape architects JMD Design began work to conserve, restore and reuse the space of the then derelict Paddington Reservoir. The facility reopened in 2008 as a sunken garden with rooftop reserve above the preserved eastern chamber. The facility integrates the remains of the original brick, timber and iron structure with modern elements of sculptural, structural and functional significance which provide access to the sunken garden via stairs and an elevator as well as ramped access to the rooftop reserve.

=== Condition ===
As at 27 February 2014, the reservoir was decommissioned in the late nineteenth century and subsequently used for storage and latterly as a mechanical workshop associated with a service station on Oxford Street. After a roof collapse behind the garage in 1990 it was in disuse. Generally the reservoir structure is in poor condition as roughly half of the roof structure is collapsed.

=== Modifications and dates ===
- Late 19th century: reservoir decommissioned and subsequently used for storage
- 1925: modifications to the structure to accommodate the removal of a number of internal columns (Source: drawings held by the Council of the City of South Sydney).
- Latterly (pre 1990) the site was used as a mechanical workshop associated with a service station on Oxford Street.
- 1990: roof collapsed behind the garage and site was in disuse.
- 2009: conservation and adaptive reuse works finish and site is re-opened as a public park, Paddington Reserve Gardens.

== Heritage listing ==
As at 4 July 2000, the Paddington Reservoir is of State significance. It is an integral part of the original Sydney Water Supply System and is a unique example of construction methods and technology advances in Australia in the nineteenth century. The grassed roof area also provides a valuable public recreation space within the inner city precinct which is of high significance to the local community.

The Paddington Reservoir with its low key appearance functioned with very little public fanfare as a high level reservoir supplying Paddington and its surrounds until the turn of the century. The contribution of the reservoir was largely unsung but it was an essential component of the infrastructure which supported the development of the suburb of Paddington. The reservoir also had an important role as an open space in an otherwise densely built-up city suburb. Although perhaps not initially intended as a welcome respite of green space, which was also used to house stands for various street processions. The grassed surface became the Walter Read Reserve in 1953 and was a popular recreational space, used by the local residents. The reservoir roof has been a well used, popular recreation space, held in high regard by local inhabitants.

Since the 1950s there have been a number of attempts to demolish the reservoir and/or use the space for carparking. There has been concerted defence by local groups since the possibility of demolition was first raised. The long-standing community efforts to preserve the reservoir are a testament to the high level of regard in which it is held by the community.

Paddington Reservoir was listed on the New South Wales State Heritage Register on 2 April 1999 having satisfied the following criteria.

The place is important in demonstrating the course, or pattern, of cultural or natural history in New South Wales.

Paddington Reservoir is an integral part of the original Sydney Water Supply System and is a unique example of construction methods and technology advances in Australia in the nineteenth century. The two reservoirs of the Botany Swamps Scheme, Crown Street and Paddington are thought to have been designed in the early 1850s by Edward Bell, the City Engineer.

The place is important in demonstrating aesthetic characteristics and/or a high degree of creative or technical achievement in New South Wales.

The exterior of the reservoir contains a number of characteristic nineteenth century features. The Oxford Street frontage was lined with an iron palisade fence designed with some care and attention to detail particularly with regard to the fence columns. The fence columns and original air vents above the reservoir were decorative elements topped with a sphere. The air vents were designed in a similar manner but in a more massive scale with the air holes located well out of reach. The interior spaces, particularly the vaulted ceilings, the arched intermediate and central walls and the ironbark timber columns are a rare nineteenth century public utility interior space. The aesthetics of the spatial qualities presented by that space are particularly evocative of the nineteenth century and are unique to the earliest reservoirs.

The place has a strong or special association with a particular community or cultural group in New South Wales for social, cultural or spiritual reasons.

The reservoir was an essential component of the infrastructure which supported the development of the suburb of Paddington. The reservoir had an important role as an open space in a densely built -up city suburb. The reservoir roof had been a well used, popular recreation space, held in high regard by local inhabitants.

The place has potential to yield information that will contribute to an understanding of the cultural or natural history of New South Wales.

Paddington Reservoir is significant for its ability to demonstrate advances in technology and local manufacturing expertise over time. It demonstrates the waterproofing technology of the period. The level of workmanship and care throughout is also informative showing the range of skills and craftsmanship available in the local building trades.

The place possesses uncommon, rare or endangered aspects of the cultural or natural history of New South Wales.

The Paddington Reservoir is a component of the first reservoir system designed to supply Sydney City and surrounds. The reservoir is the second of the two reservoirs in the system. Paddington is the only nineteenth-century reservoir which is out of commission and capable of being available for public inspection on a regular basis. The reservoir exhibits a rare, early, large-scale use of Portland cement. In its roof the reservoir provides a rare area of open space for the enjoyment of the inhabitants of inner Paddington.

The place is important in demonstrating the principal characteristics of a class of cultural or natural places/environments in New South Wales.

The reservoir represents the peak mid nineteenth century water storage technology in Australia. The eastern chambers of the reservoir particularly represent a peak in Australia's technological and secondary manufacturing development. Ongoing use of the reservoir as public recreation space represents a significant feature of the Paddington community lifestyle.

== See also ==
- Bankstown Reservoir
- Balmain Reservoir
- Petersham Reservoir
- Waverley Reservoirs
- List of parks in Sydney
