= Balmain Reservoir =

Building in Sydney, New South Wales

Coordinates: 33°51′32″S 151°10′56″E

- Interactive map of the Balmain Reservoir area

General information
- Status: decommissioned
- Construction started: 1914
- Completed: 1915
- Closed: 1965
- Owner: MWS&DB
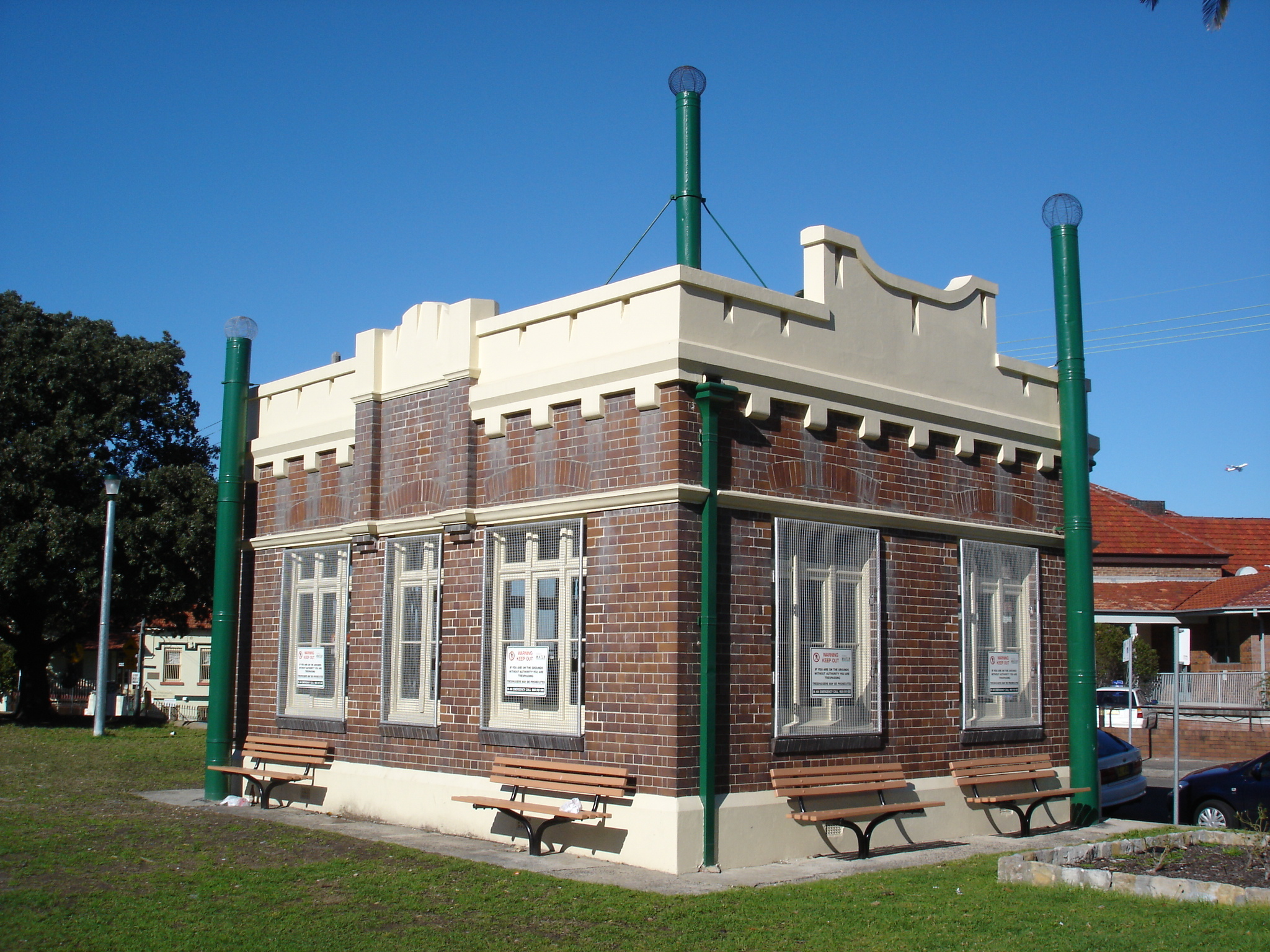
- Interactive map of Balmain Reservoir

Dam and spillways
- Dam volume: 2,376,000 gallons

The Balmain Reservoir is a 2,376,000-imperial-gallon (10.80 ML) disused, covered reservoir located under Gladstone Park in Balmain, in the Inner West of Sydney, New South Wales, Australia.

== Description ==
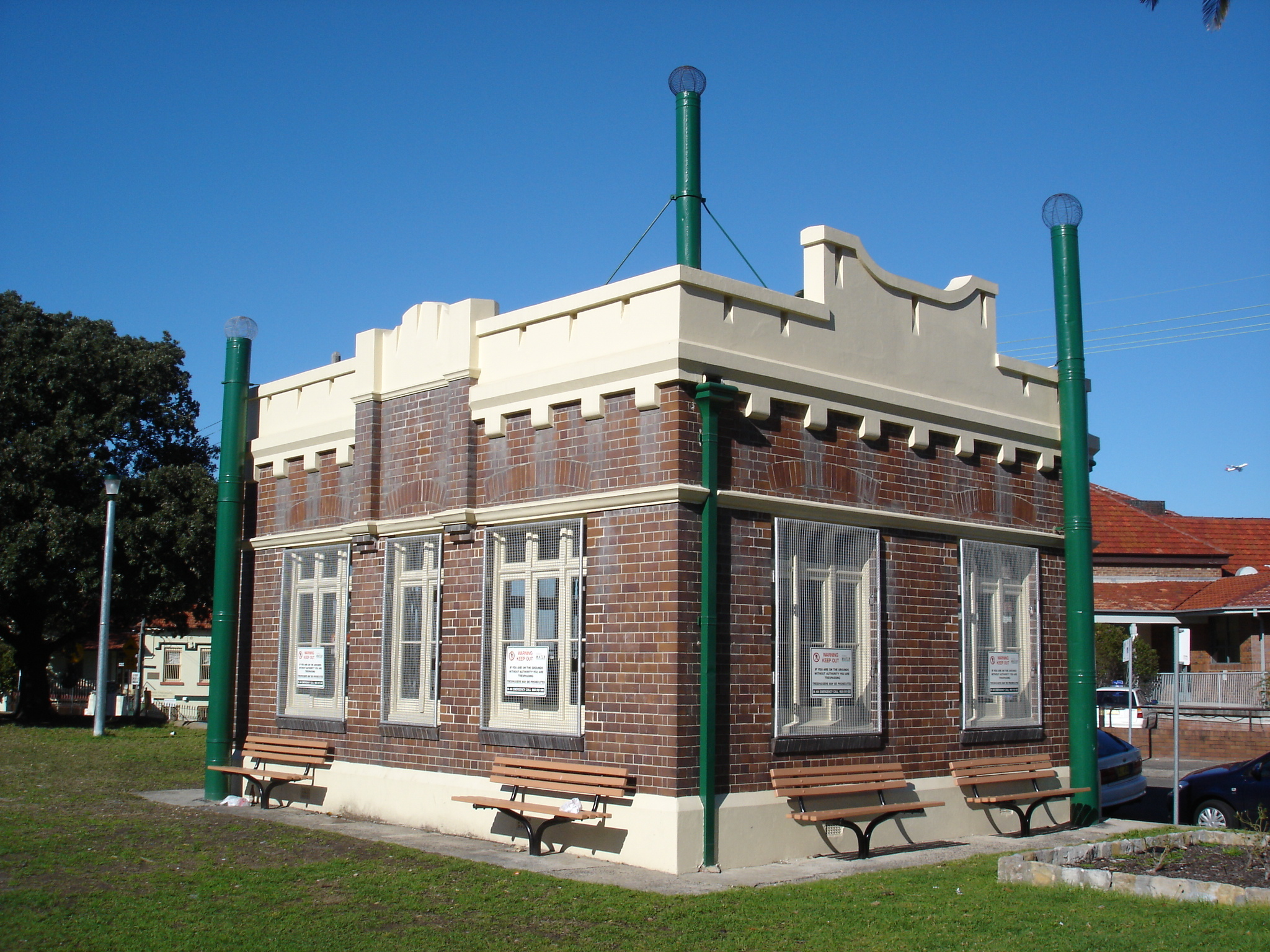
Balmain Reservoir Valve House

The reservoir is rectangular in shape, measuring 180 by 108 feet (55 by 33 m) and is 22 feet (6.7 m) tall. It is divided into two chambers by a 15-foot-6-inch (4.72 m) separating wall which supports a walkway. The reinforced concrete roof and park above are supported by concrete pillars spaced at 12 feet (3.7 m) intervals throughout both chambers.

Access to the reservoir is through the adjoining valve house which extends a further two storeys underground and housed pumping equipment in the lowest level.

The entire facility comprising the reservoir, valve house and remaining equipment is owned and maintained by Sydney Water.

== History ==
Balmain reservoir was built in 1915 by the Metropolitan Board of Water Supply and Sewerage, Sydney, and was originally supplied with water by gravity from Potts Hill. The restoration of Gladstone Park and the erection of a bandstand was made a condition of construction of the reservoir. The facility was made redundant by the commissioning of Petersham Reservoir in 1965 and has remained disused ever since.

Valve House
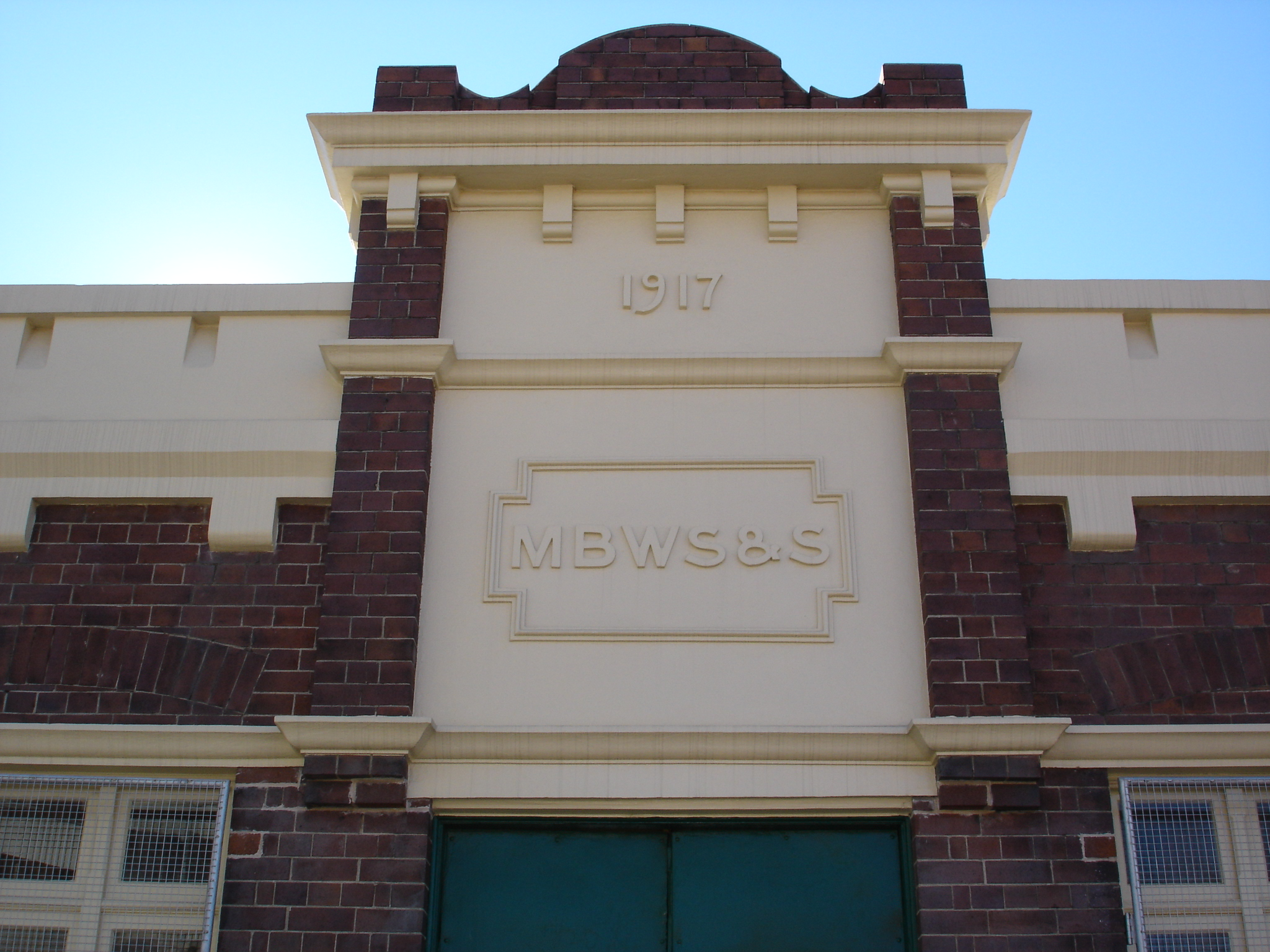
- Balmain Reservoir Valve House
- Interactive map of the Valve House area

General information
- Status: decommissioned
- Construction started: 1919
- Completed: 1919
- Closed: 1965
- Owner: MWS&DB

The neighbouring valve house was constructed in 1917 on the Booth Street frontage of the park and this, together with the footings of the bandstand, can still be seen today. Restoration work on the valve house earned a National Trust of Australia Heritage Award in 2006.

== See also ==
- Bankstown Reservoir
- Paddington Reservoir
