= White Horse Hotel, Surry Hills =

White Horse Hotel
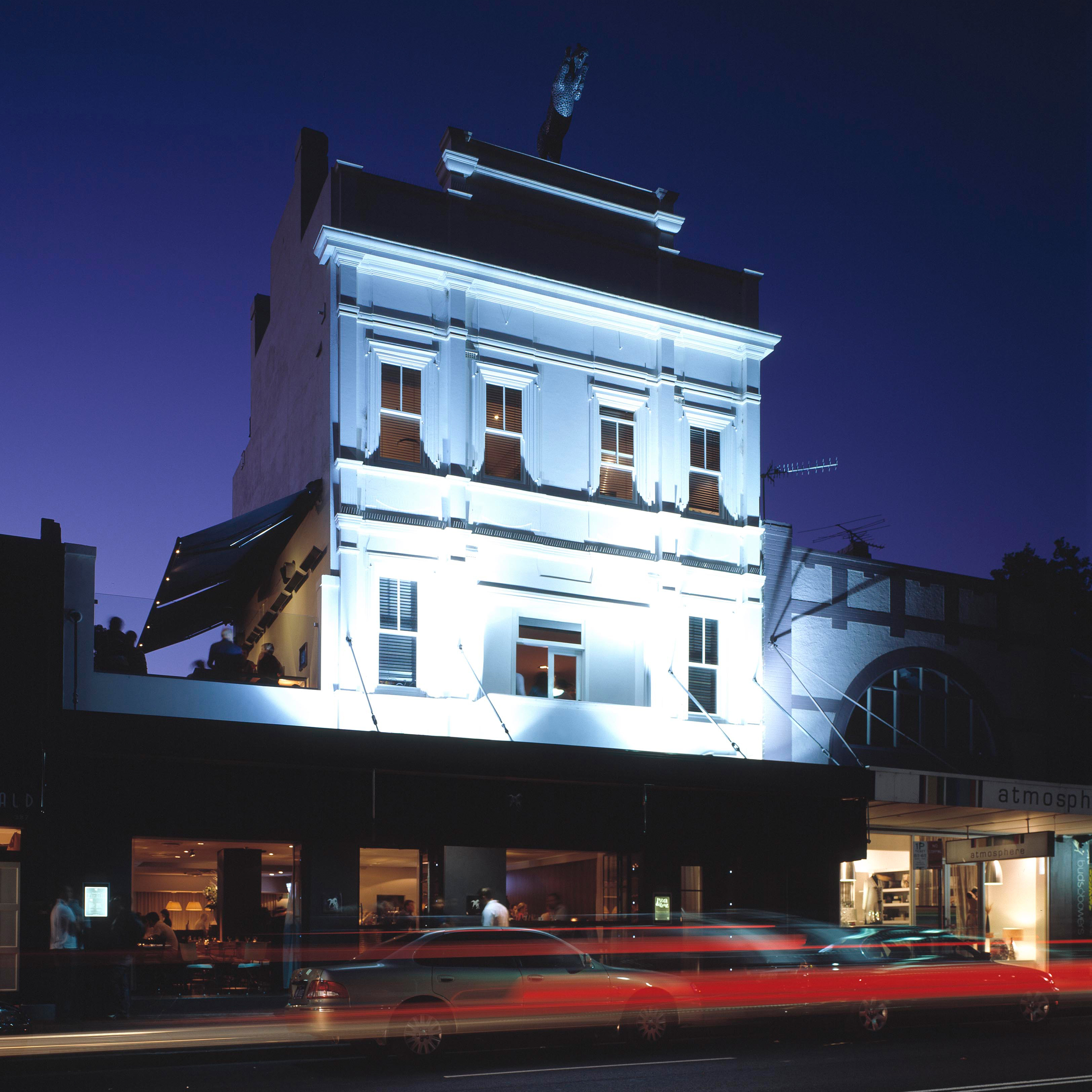
- The White Horse Hotel at night
- Interactive map of the White Horse Hotel area

General information
- Status: Completed
- Type: Australian pub
- Location: 381 Crown Street, Surry Hills, New South Wales, Australia
- Coordinates: 33°53′26″S 151°12′47″E
- Completed: c. 1930
- Owner: Precision Group

Website
- thewhitehorse.com.au

The White Horse Hotel is a three-storey public hotel located at 381 Crown Street in Surry Hills, Sydney, Australia. Its appearance is distinguished by a large sculpture of a silver stallion constructed of galvanised steel, created in a rearing pose and set atop its facade.

== History ==
The White Horse Hotel was constructed in the 1930s when Surry Hills was a working-class suburb. British historian Jane Peyton writes that at that time, the hotel was a central gathering place for colourful characters.

Since then, Surry Hills has become gentrified over time and with it the Hotel has improved significantly. The Hotel was refurbished in 2004, at which time a new bar and a brasserie were installed, and the silver stallion was lifted onto the roof, but initially had difficulty convincing the City of Sydney it was a work of art, rather than an advertisement. According to Peyton, the sculpture, by Andy Scott, was challenging to import. It was made in Scotland, cut into pieces, shipped to Australia and then reconstructed on the roof.

In 2005 the Hotel was purchased by Precision Group for $7.5 million. The site was again refurbished in 2014 to update lounge areas, restaurant, function room, and a rooftop terrace and garden. Notably, designer Matt Woods commissioned local artists such as Ben Morris to decorate the walls in the downstairs section with murals around the theme "café racer-inspired" bar as part of an approach "rooted in the heritage of the site".

== See also ==
- List of public houses in Australia
