= Centennial Park, New South Wales =

Centennial Park
- Suburb
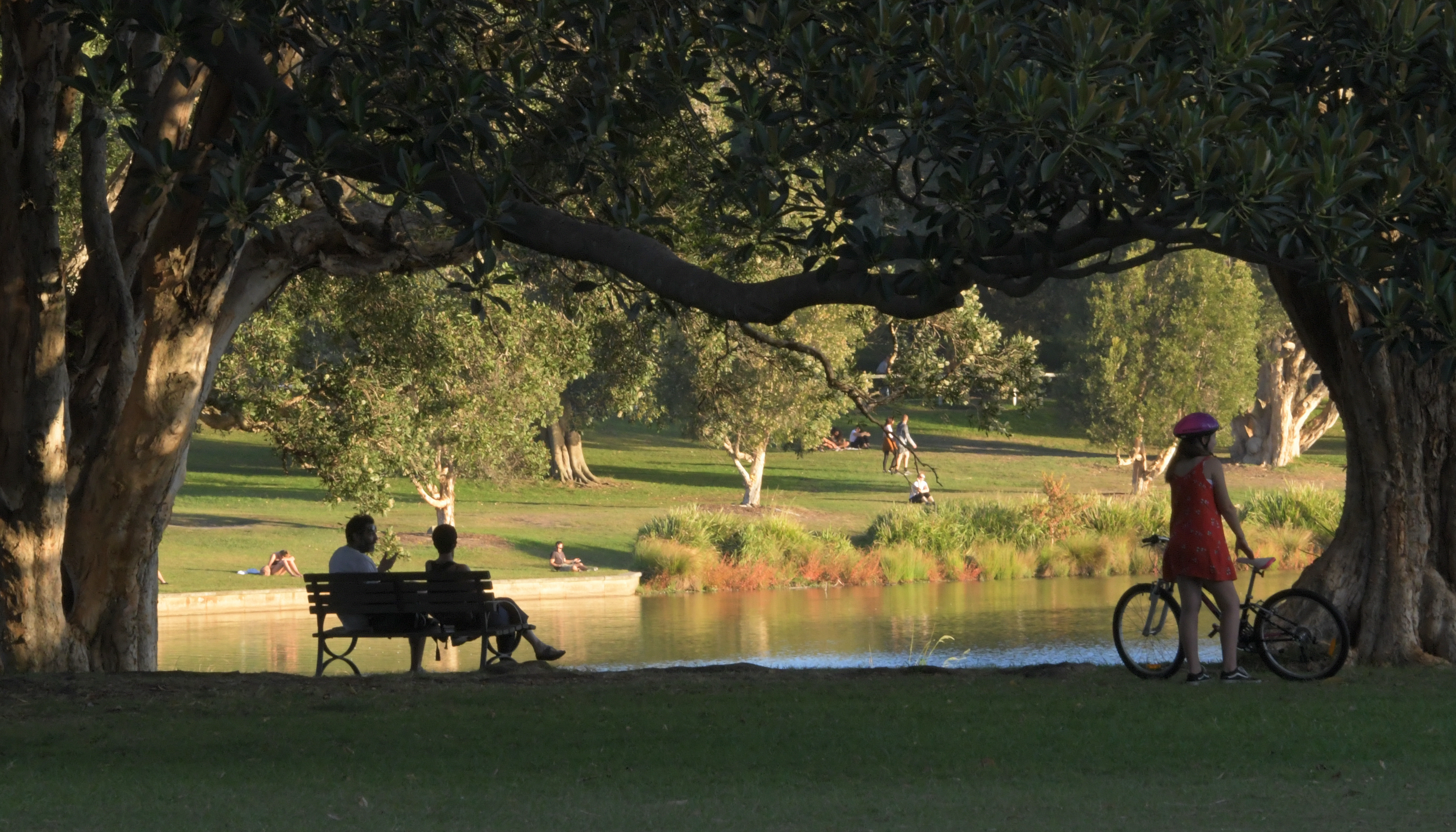
- Centennial Park

- Interactive map of Centennial Park
- Country: Australia
- State: New South Wales
- City: Sydney
- LGAs: City of Sydney; City of Randwick
- Location: 4 km (2.5 mi) from Sydney CBD

Government
  - State electorates: Heffron; Vaucluse
  - Federal division: Wentworth

Area
  - Total: 2.23 km^{2} (0.86 sq mi)
- Elevation: 40 m (130 ft)

Population
  - Total: 2,225 (SAL 2021)
  - Density: 998/km^{2} (2,580/sq mi)
- Postcode: 2021
Suburbs around Centennial Park
Paddington	Woollahra	Bondi Junction
Moore Park	Centennial Park	Queens Park
Kensington	Randwick	Randwick

Centennial Park is a suburb split between the local government area of the City of Sydney and the City of Randwick, located 4 kilometres (2.5 mi) east from the Sydney central business district, in the eastern suburbs of Sydney in the state of New South Wales, Australia.

Centennial Park is home to a number of wild animals including birds, rabbits, and foxes. It is also home to a number of equestrian schools and other domestic animal endeavours such as the Centennial Park Rabbit Retreat, a boarding facility for rabbits in the Centennial Park and Paddington area.

== Geography ==
The western fringe of the suburb is used for residential purposes and is within the City of Sydney. It features quality houses on large blocks as well as large multi-unit buildings. The bulk of the suburb consists of the Centennial Parklands (from which the suburb takes its name) and is within the City of Randwick. The parklands extend further partly into the suburb of Queens Park, adjacent to (but separate from) the park of the same name in that suburb.

== History ==
Centennial Park started out as a reserve to protect the central ponds and swamps which formed early Sydney's water supply. When it was superseded by the Nepean water supply system in the 1880s it was decided to create a large park, which opened as Centennial Park in 1888. Part of the funding was to come from selling off residential lots adjacent to the park, but this did not occur until 1904 when 101 acres (41 ha) of land along the western border was subdivided. To ensure high standards of residential development, strict requirements were imposed. No wooden buildings or terrace homes were allowed; brick or stone were mandated, with tile or slate roofs. Between 1905 and 1925, a wide range of substantial, quality homes were built, featuring a mixture of Federation, Arts and Crafts, Victorian and Old English styles. The streets created were Martin Road, Robertson Road, Lang Road and Cook Road. Sections of the park were to be cleared in the 1970s for a sports complex but the project was called off after the NSW Builders Labourers Federation placed a green ban in response to a request from park users.

== Notable houses ==
- Patrick White house (also known as Highbury), was the home of writer Patrick White for many years, until his death. It is heritage-listed.
- The Crossways is an example of the international Arts and Crafts style. It was designed by Waterhouse and Lake and built in 1908. The Crossways was built as part of the subdivision of 1904 that created the suburb, and was the home of physician/surgeon Dr Craig Gordon. It is heritage-listed.
- Devon is a distinctive example of the Arts and Crafts style. It is heritage-listed.
- Murrulla is a two-storey home in the Federation Anglo-Dutch style, which is rare in residential architecture. The first known occupant was Solomon Cohen in 1908. The house has a state heritage listing.
- The Bungalow is a heritage-listed home in the California Bungalow style. It has a skillion roof that distinguishes it from other bungalows like the ranger's cottage in the park.
- Devoncliffe is a two-storey mansion designed in the Federation Free Classical style and made of sandstone. It was built c.1910 and is heritage-listed.
- Walshome was built c.1890 and features the polychrome brickwork style that was popular at the time. It is an example of the architecture of the Boom Era, when people were building elaborate homes to display their wealth. It is listed on the Register of the National Estate.
- Stanton Hall (also known as Babington) is an example of the Inter-War Free Classical style, and is heritage-listed.

== Heritage listings ==
Centennial Park has a number of heritage-listed sites, including:

- 3R Oxford Street: Centennial Park Reservoir
- 5R Oxford Street: Woollahra Reservoir
- 20 Martin Road: Patrick White house

== Population ==
At the 2021 census, 2,225 people were living in Centennial Park.

In the 2016 census, there were 2,376 people in Centennial Park. 57.0% of people were born in Australia. The next most common country of birth was England at 6.1%. 70.6% of people only spoke English at home. The most common responses for religion were No Religion, so described 34.9% and Catholic 24.0%.

== Climate ==
Climate data for Centennial Park Round House
Month	Jan	Feb	Mar	Apr	May	Jun	Jul	Aug	Sep	Oct	Nov	Dec	Year
Mean daily maximum °C (°F)	26.1 (79.0)	26.0 (78.8)	24.9 (76.8)	22.4 (72.3)	19.7 (67.5)	17.2 (63.0)	16.7 (62.1)	18.1 (64.6)	20.3 (68.5)	22.3 (72.1)	24.1 (75.4)	25.5 (77.9)	21.9 (71.4)
Mean daily minimum °C (°F)	17.4 (63.3)	17.7 (63.9)	16.2 (61.2)	13.2 (55.8)	9.9 (49.8)	7.8 (46.0)	6.5 (43.7)	7.2 (45.0)	9.3 (48.7)	12.0 (53.6)	14.1 (57.4)	16.3 (61.3)	12.3 (54.1)

== Gallery ==
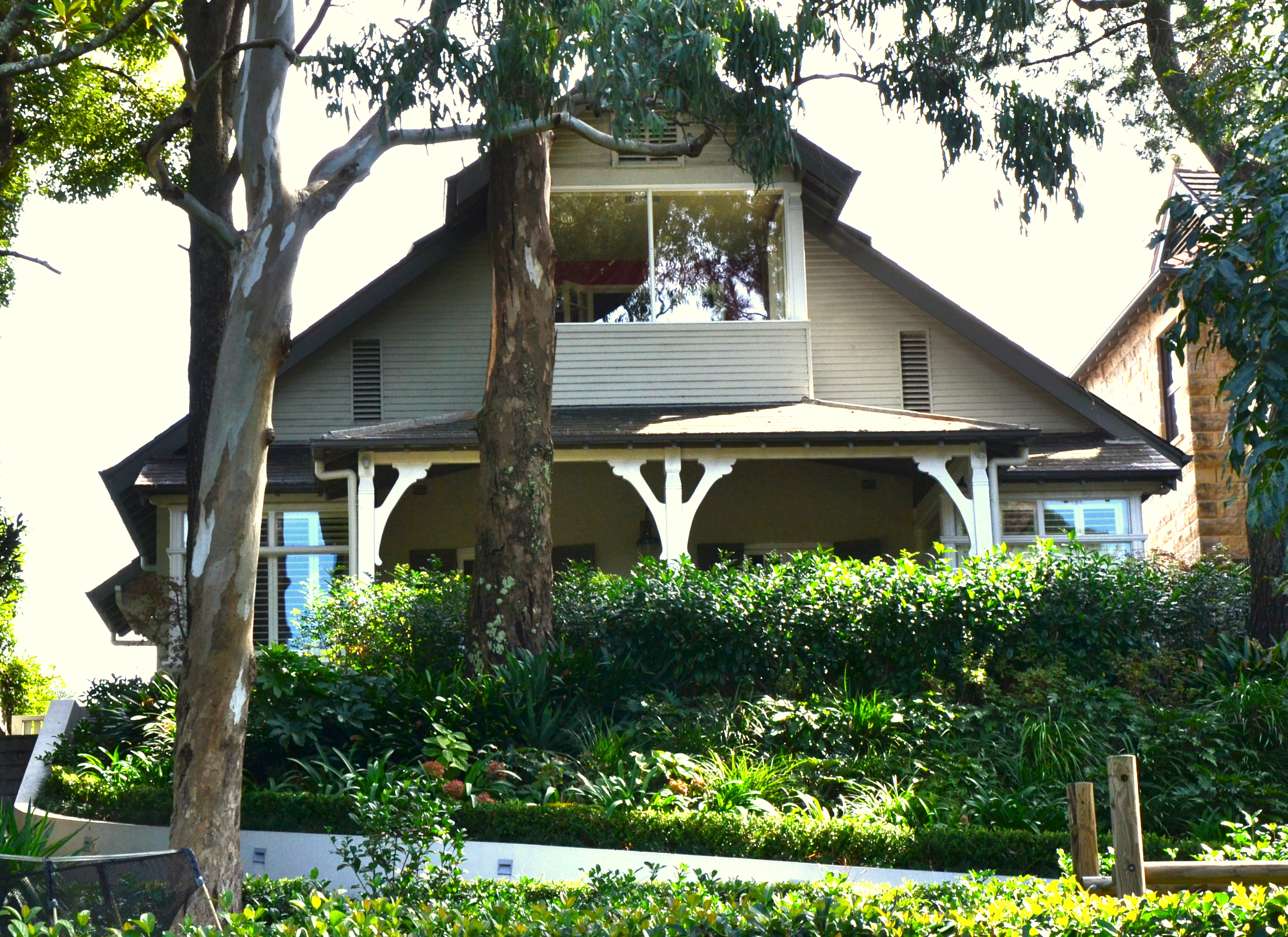
Highbury, former home of Patrick White

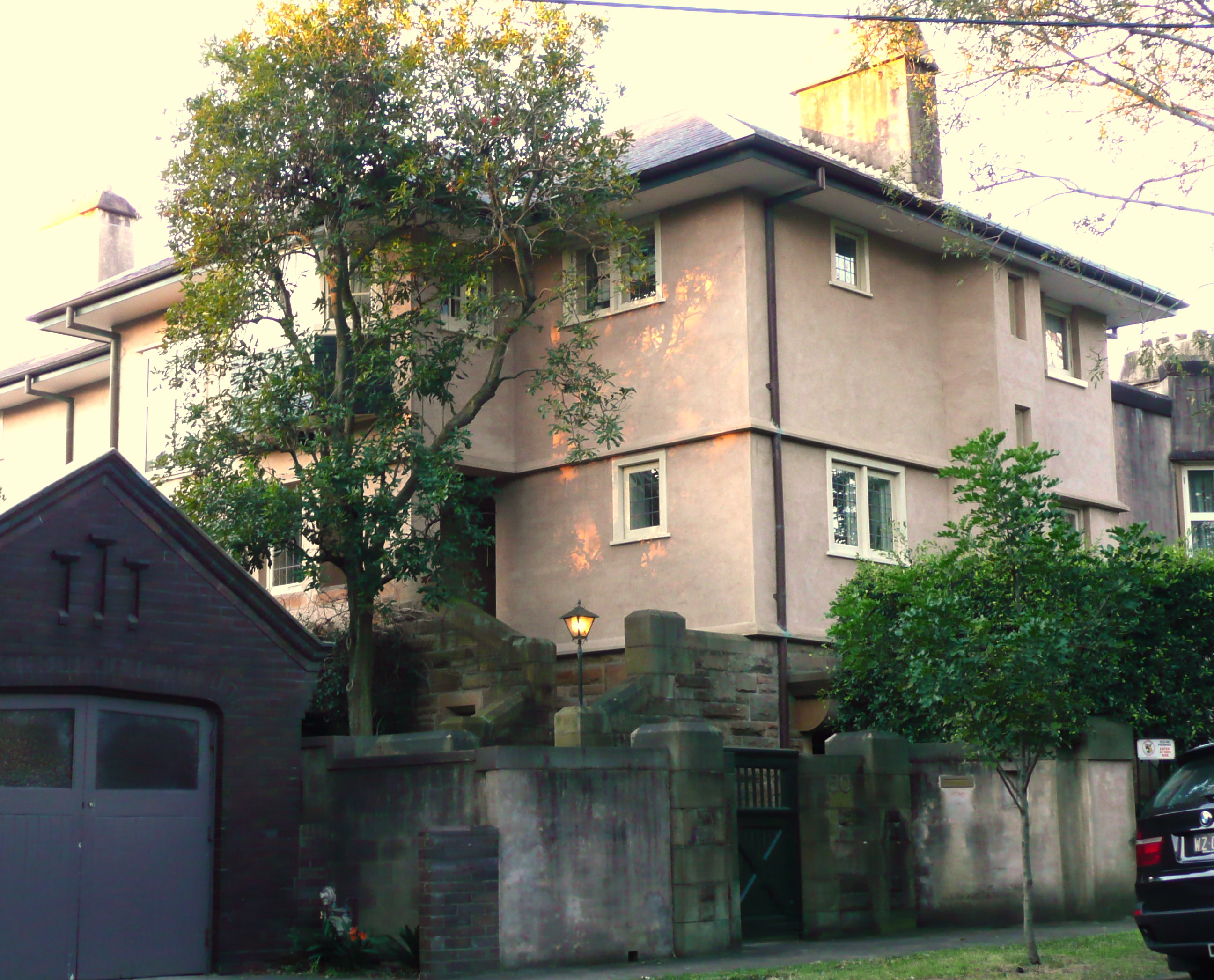
The Crossways, Martin Road

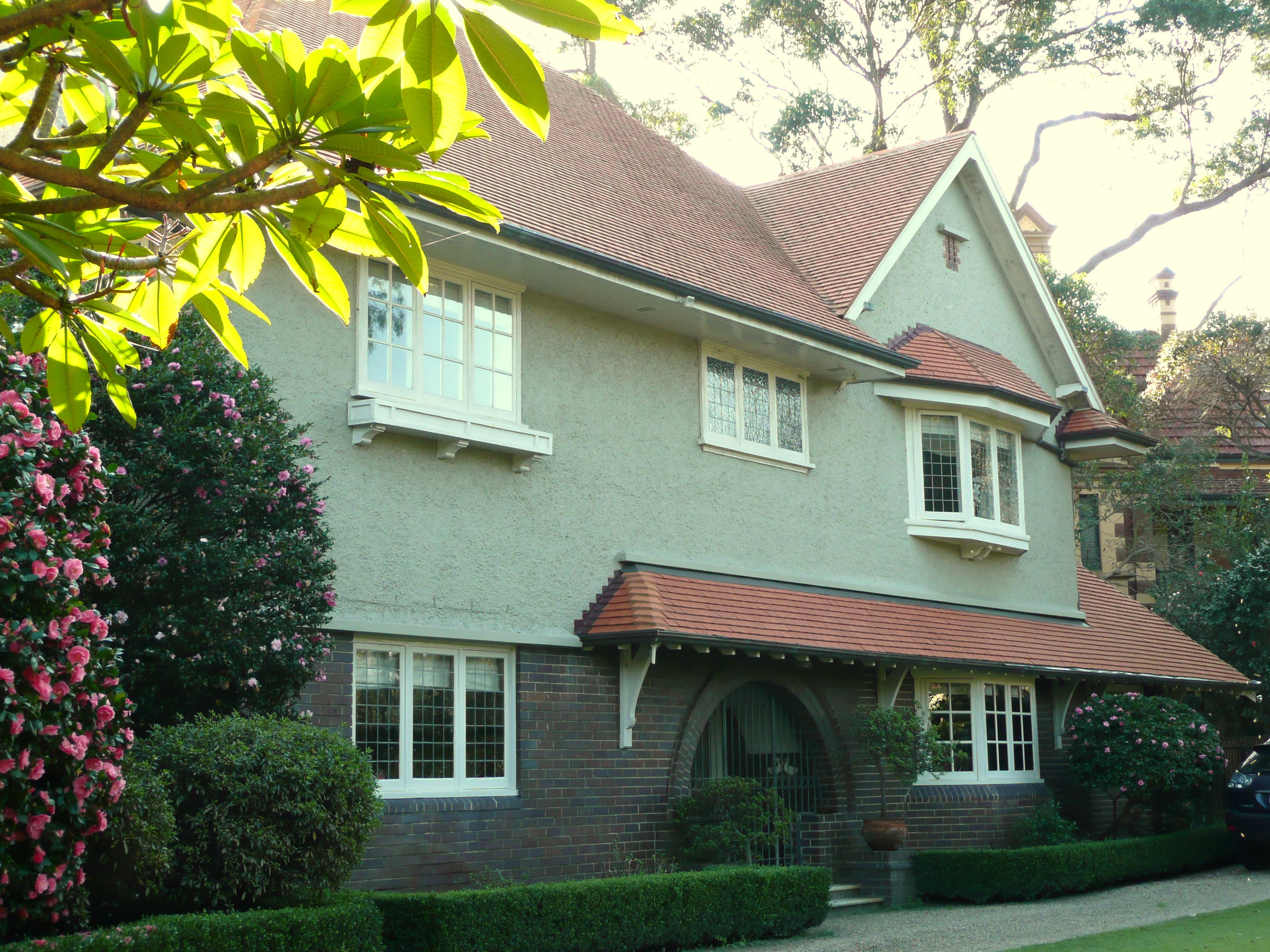
Devon, Martin Road

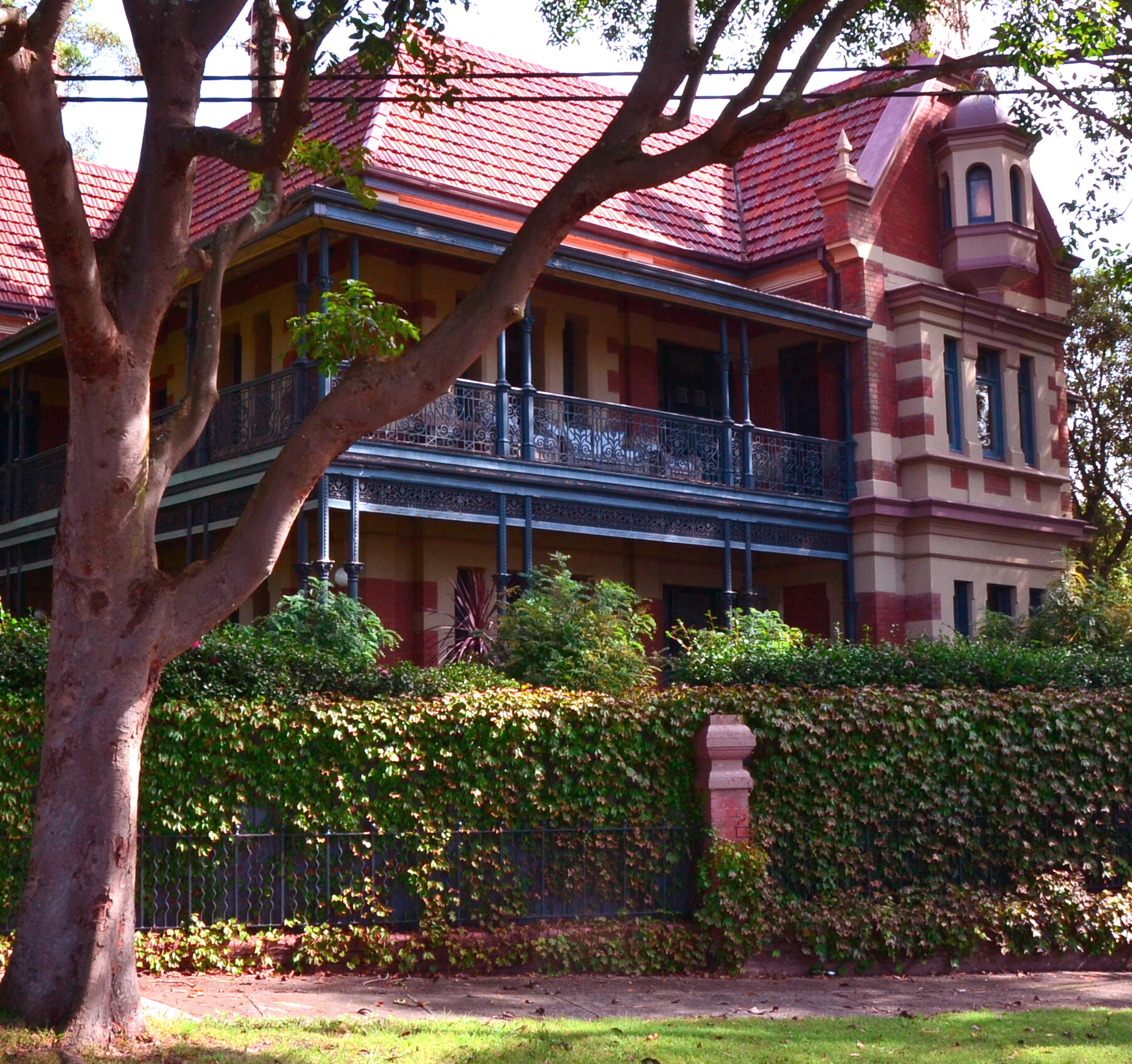
Murrulla, Martin Road

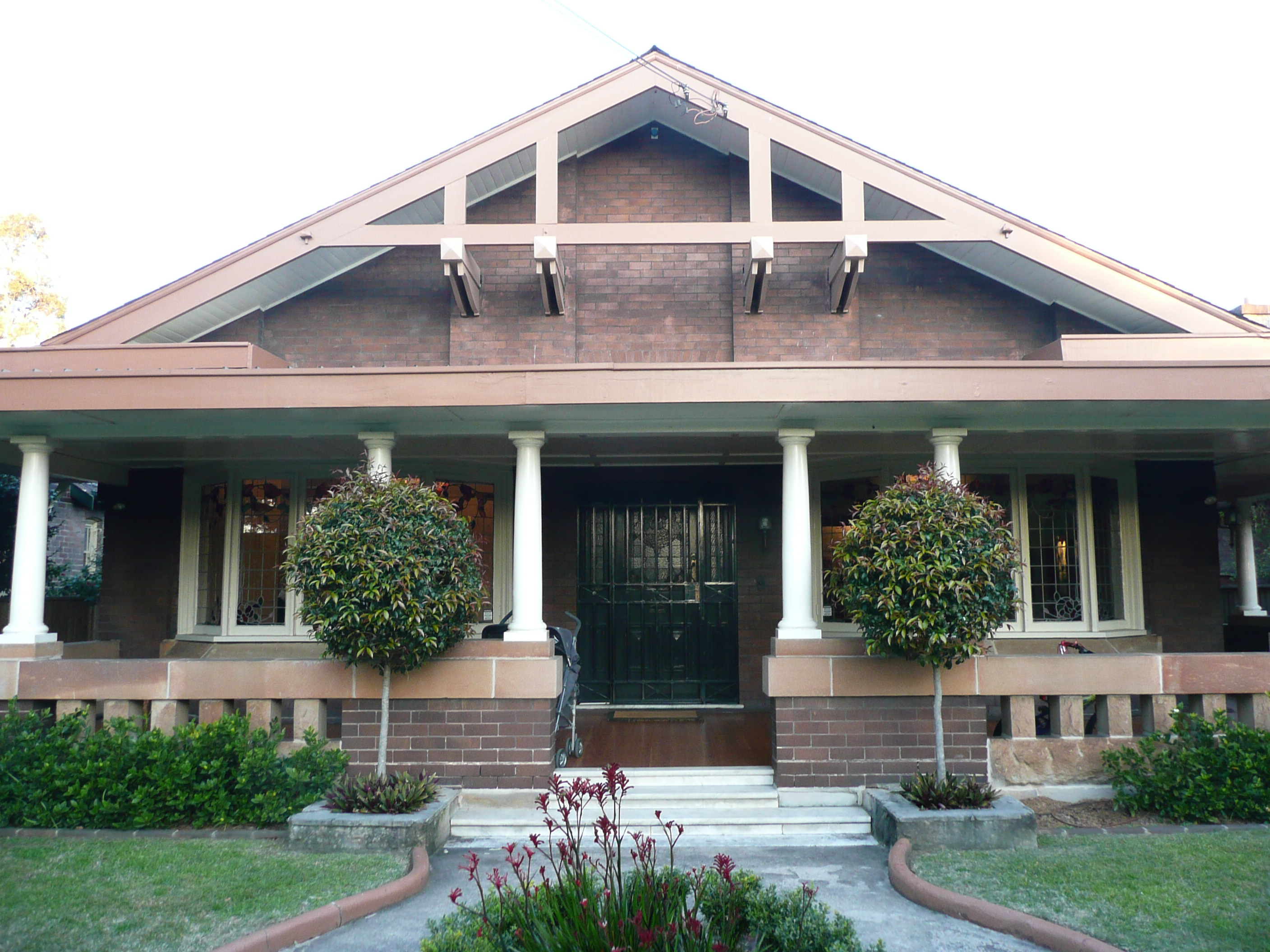
The Bungalow, Robertson Road

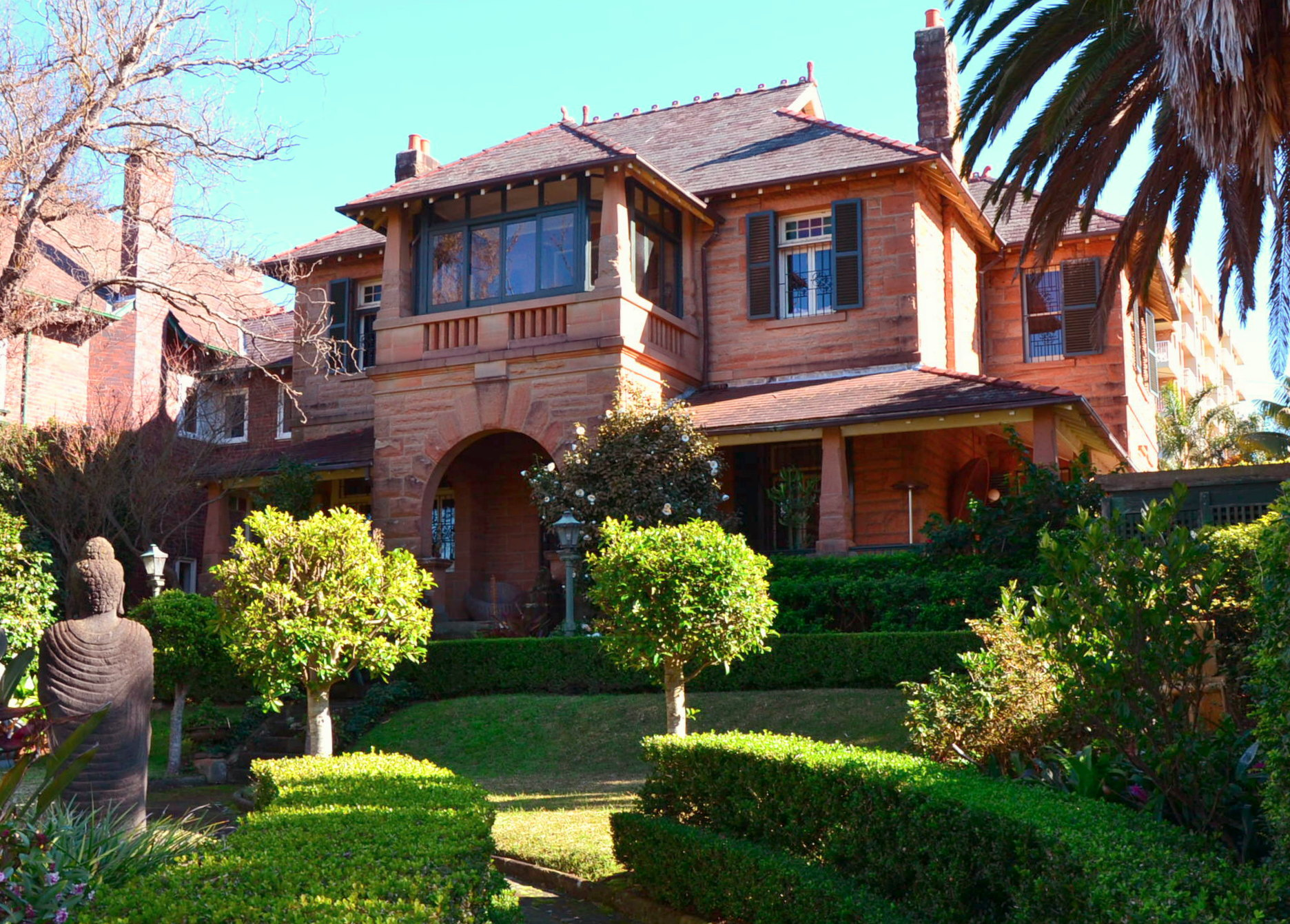
Devoncliffe, Lang Road

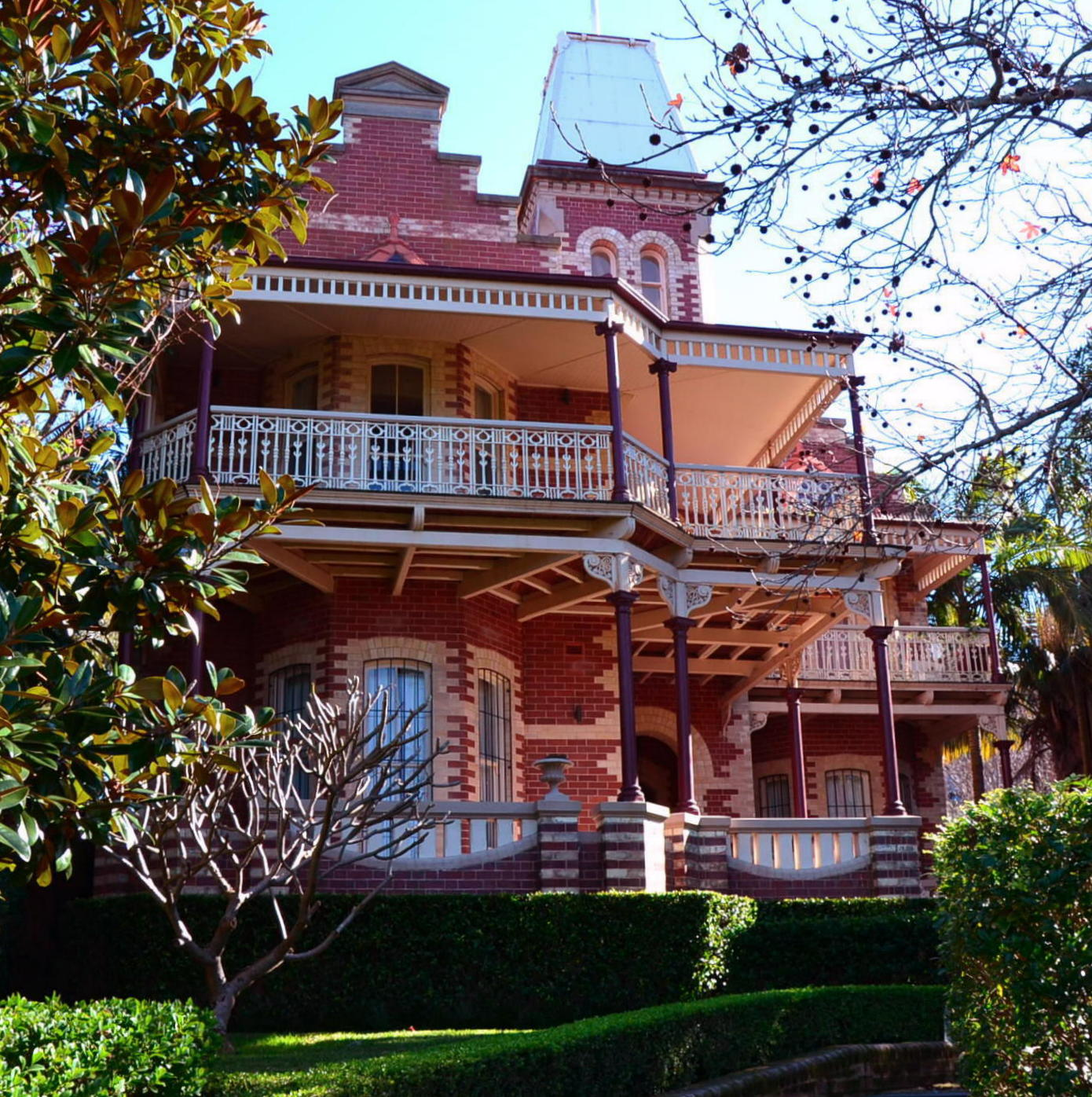
Walshome, Lang Road
