= Woollahra Reservoir =

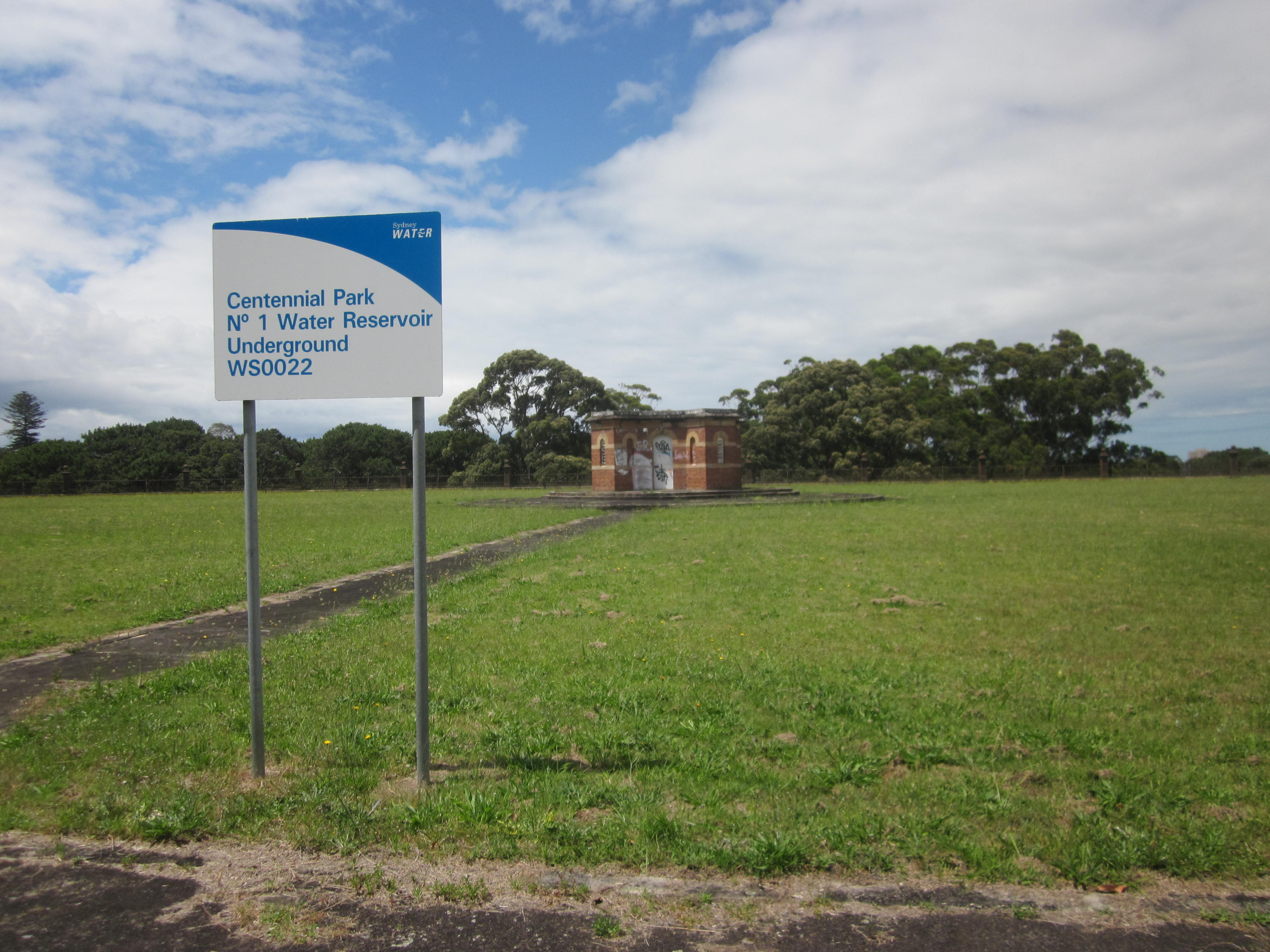
- Woollahra Reservoir

- Location within Sydney Location within Australia
- 33°53′25″S 151°14′28″E
- Location: 5R Oxford Street, Centennial Park, New South Wales, Australia

History
- Built: 1880

Site notes
- Architect: NSW Public Works Department
- Owner: Sydney Water

New South Wales Heritage Register
- Official name: Woollahra Reservoir WS022
- Type: State heritage (built)
- Designated: 18 November 1999
- Reference no.: 1356
- Type: Water Supply Reservoir/ Dam
- Category: Utilities – Water
- Builders: NSW Public Works Department

The Woollahra Reservoir or WS022 is a heritage-listed underground reservoir at 5R Oxford Street, Centennial Park, New South Wales, Australia. It was designed and built by the NSW Public Works Department. The property is owned by Sydney Water. A sign attached to a building on the site states that this is known as "Centennial Park number 1 Water Reservoir Underground WS0022". The reservoir is adjacent to Centennial Park Reservoir. This reservoir is closer to York Street than Centennial Park Reservoir. The area is enclosed by a high fence and a sign on the main gate states: WARNING KEEP OUT" and that trespassers may be prosecuted.

== History ==
The Centennial Parklands, as it stands today, represents 190 years of colonial history. The settlers had an immediate impact on the lives of the Gadi people whose clan territory takes in most of the Sydney peninsula. Gadi country extends between what is now Darling Harbour and South Head, and includes Centennial Park, Moore Park and Queens Park.

Close to where Centennial Park and Moore Park are today, an area that became known as the Kangaroo Ground was recorded on a map engraved by J. Walker in 1791 or 1793. This map shows the location of what the English called the Kangaroo Ground, in the clan territories of the Gadi. The richer soils and park like atmosphere observed here by Tench and others would almost certainly have been created through regular firing by the Gadi to keep the undergrowth clear and attract kangaroos and other large game to the area for hunting.

=== Sydney Common ===
Centennial Parklands, comprising Centennial Park, Moore Park and Queens Park, are part of the Second Sydney Common dedicated in 1811.

As the settlement of Sydney began to develop it became necessary to set aside common land on the outskirts of the town. On 5 October 1811 Governor Macquarie proclaimed the 200 hectares (490 acres) to the south of South Head Road as the Sydney Common, for use by the public. The common land contained a vital resource in the form of a constant supply of pure water due to the natural aquifers present in the Botany Sands system. In 1820, Macquarie set aside the water reserve in the east of the Sydney Common. Between 1827 and 1838, Lachlan Water Tunnel (Busby's Bore) was built providing a supply of freshwater to a terminal in Hyde Park. It remained Sydney Town's sole source of water supply until 1858, when it was supplanted by a scheme to pump water from the Botany Swamps, located further to the south.

=== Lachlan Swamps & water supply ===
The swamps, located within the Sydney Common, were naturally aquified and were an ideal source of water. In recognition of this precious resource, the Lachlan Water Reserve was founded in 1820. The Tank Stream supply of water for Sydney was inadequate and had a high level of pollutants, in 1825, the colonial government set up an enquiry into the use of the Lachlan Swamps to provide a water supply to Sydney. John Busby, a mineral surveyor, was appointed to design a water system to convey the water from the swamps to the town centre. Busby originally considered conveying the water using iron pipes, but assessed this would be too expensive. Finally he proposed a long tunnel be constructed, entirely through Crown Land.

=== Busby's Bore ===
The Lachlan Water Tunnel, better known as Busby's Bore, was Sydney's first piped water supply. The "Bore" or tunnel was, on average between 1.7 metres (5.5 ft) high by 1.4 metres (4.5 ft) wide and carried water from the Lachlan Swamps to Hyde Park. The whole length of the Tunnel was 3,700 metres (12,000 ft) and capable of holding 6.8 megalitres (1,500,000 imp gal) gallons and 15 days' supply of water.

Sydney Council took control of the Water Supply in 1842 and was responsible for the whole of the Lachlan Water Reserve. In 1861, it was decided that the whole of the Sydney Common did in fact belong to the people of Sydney. Common land was given to the authority of the Municipal Council. Moore Park was then laid out.

To meet increasing demands for water, portions of the Swamp were dammed in 1872, resulting in an embankment just below what is now known as Kensington ponds, and a series of seven dams throughout the swamp.

The first major development encroaching onto the Sydney Common was the siting of Victoria Barracks on Oxford Street on the north east of the common. Designed in 1838 and completed ten years later, the Barracks was strategically sited between Port Jackson and Botany Bay to prevent an enemy invasion. The soldiers soon established the Military Garden, and by 1852 they had added the Garrison Cricket ground and a rifle range on land to the south of the barracks. In 1866 the Sydney Common was given to the Municipal Council of Sydney for development under the Sydney Common Improvement Bill of 1866.

=== A public park ===
In the second half of the nineteenth century, parts of Sydney Common were made into parkland. Lord Carrington, the Governor of NSW 1885-1890, advocated the city of Sydney should have a large recreational space in the fashion of a "grand park". Sir Henry Parkes, the premier, recognized the potential of this proposal and facilitated its realisation.

Charles Moore JP, the Mayor of Sydney from 1867 to 1869, worked on developing a public park for the recreation of the people of Sydney. Allotments of land alongside Oxford Street were sold to fund the developments and soon Moore had overseen the construction of Randwick and Moore Park Roads and the creation of a public park incorporating the land around them. Charles Moore, Director of the Sydney Botanic Gardens, supplied the distinctive tree plantations.

=== Moore Park ===
In 1866 Sydney City Council dedicated 153 hectares (378 acres) of the north west section of Sydney Common as a recreation ground for the public to help alleviate growing pressures for outdoor activities, particularly organised sports. The area was named Moore Park in 1867 after Charles Moore, Mayor of Sydney City Council 1867-1869. Moore Park became the focus for major sporting events and entertainment facilities with the establishment of the Zoological Gardens in 1879, the Royal Agricultural Society Showground, and the first course of the Australian Golf Club in 1882.

=== Queens Park ===
Queens Park was created by the Centennial Celebration Act 1887. By 1895 it contained an eleven-hole golf course which was removed to Botany in 1899. Since the 1930s Queens Park has been used as a sports field by Christian Brothers College, Waverley and various local sporting groups.

=== Centennial Park ===
The Centenary Bill was presented to NSW Parliament on 27 June 1887 introducing the notion of a park that would be accessible to the whole mass of people down to the very poorest class of the community. It would also transform what was regarded as an unsightly area into a region of loveliness and beauty. Centennial Park was created by the Centennial Celebrations Act 1887 to commemorate the 100th anniversary of the colony. This Act, however, did not define the appropriate uses of the park.

The park was established to commemorate Australia's centenary in 1888 and was opened on 26 January 1888 by Sir Henry Parkes. He stated that "this grand park is emphatically the people's park, and you must always take as much interest in it as if by your own hands you had planted the flowers, the park will be one of the grandest adornments to this beautiful country."

The newly named "Centennial Park" became the focus for the Centenary celebration preparations. Frederick Franklin, an English civil engineer, appears to have prepared the original design of the park, although historically the preservation and development of the Reserve as Centennial Park is credited to Lord Carrington, Sir Henry Parkes and Charles Moore.

The layout and landscape design of the park is attributed to Charles Moore, the Director of the Botanic Gardens from 1848-96 (but no connection with Charles Moore, Mayor). Moore enlisted the labour of the unemployed to transform the native scrubland into an open expanse of public land. James Jones, head gardener of the Botanic Gardens became the General Overseer of Centennial Park and diary entries in his Day Book indicate that he played a significant part in its construction, although his desire to conserve the native flora of the area was not fulfilled.

=== Woollahra Reservoir (within Centennial Park) ===
Woollahra Reservoir (WS 144) was completed in 1880. Together with Crown Street Reservoir (WS 34) and Waverley Reservoir No.1 (Covered) (WS 0132), it is the only other service reservoir, still in use, which was originally supplied as part of the Botany Swamps Scheme, 1858-1886. It is the second oldest reservoir still functioning in Sydney. The Botany Swamps gave way to the Upper Nepean Scheme in 1888, with temporary supply provided by the Hudson Scheme between 1886 and 1888. Woollahra Reservoir (WS 144) was originally supplied by pump from Crown Street Reservoir and serves the higher parts of the Eastern Suburbs. It also now receives water from Centennial Park No.1 Reservoir by its associated pumping station.

== Description ==
Woollahra Reservoir (WS 144) is a rectangular covered reservoir. The roof is covered with fill and grassed over. An unusual feature is the puddled clay membrane on the exterior face of the brick walls, the clay being covered by earth embankment. The puddled clay has been a successful method of enhancing the watertight requirement of the walls. The reservoir is located in the north east corner of Centennial Park, and is unobtrusive in its setting.

== Heritage listing ==
As at 5 May 2005, one of only three service reservoirs, still in service, which were associated and dependent upon the Botany Swamps Scheme (1858-1886). It is also the second oldest reservoir still in service in the Sydney Water Supply System (Crown Street Reservoir (WS 34) being the oldest. The reservoir exemplifies the high standard of engineering practice available at the end of the 19th century, in particular puddled clay blanket, brick walls and roof. The Centennial Park Group of three reservoirs, including Woollahra Reservoir (WS 144), 1880, Centennial Park No. 1 (WS 22), 1899, and Centennial Park No. 2 (WS 23), 1925, demonstrate the development in construction technology for covered reservoirs, as well as the dramatic increase in demand in the growing Sydney suburbs. The group is unique in the SWC system, because of their size, design and level of architectural detailing. All covered reservoirs are highly significant within the SWC system, since all differ in construction technology, design and architectural detailing. All therefore contribute to our understanding of the development of covered reservoirs in NSW.

Woollahra Reservoir WS022 was listed on the New South Wales State Heritage Register on 18 November 1999 having satisfied the following criteria.

The place is important in demonstrating the course, or pattern, of cultural or natural history in New South Wales.

One of only three service reservoirs, still in service, which were associated and dependent upon the Botany Swamps Scheme (1858-1886). It is also the second oldest reservoir still in service in the Sydney Water Supply System (Crown Street Reservoir (WS 34) being the oldest). This reservoir demonstrates the high level of demand by a populous suburban community.

The place is important in demonstrating aesthetic characteristics and/or a high degree of creative or technical achievement in New South Wales.

The Centennial Park Group of three reservoirs, including Woollahra Reservoir (WS 144), 1880, Centennial Park No. 1 (WS 22), 1899, and Centennial Park No. 2 (WS 23), 1925, is unique in the SWC system, because of their size, design and level of architectural detailing. Woollahra Reservoir (WS 144) is notable for the unobtrusive way it fits into its setting.

The place has potential to yield information that will contribute to an understanding of the cultural or natural history of New South Wales.

The reservoir exemplifies the high standard of engineering practice available at the end of the 19th century, in particular puddled clay blanket, brick walls and roof. The Centennial Park Group of three reservoirs, including Woollahra Reservoir (WS 144), 1880, Centennial Park No. 1 (WS 22), 1899, and Centennial Park No. 2 (WS 23), 1925, demonstrate the development in construction technology for covered reservoirs, as well as the dramatic increase in demand in the growing Sydney suburbs. The group is unique in the SWC system, because of their size, design and level of architectural detailing. All covered reservoirs are highly significant within the SWC system, since all differ in construction technology, design and architectural detailing. All therefore contribute to our understanding of the development of covered reservoirs in NSW.

The place possesses uncommon, rare or endangered aspects of the cultural or natural history of New South Wales.

One of a small group of large covered reservoirs in brick or concrete, each demonstrating differences in construction, design and architectural detailing. It is one of only four reservoirs associated with the Botany Swamps Supply.
