= Centennial Park Reservoir =

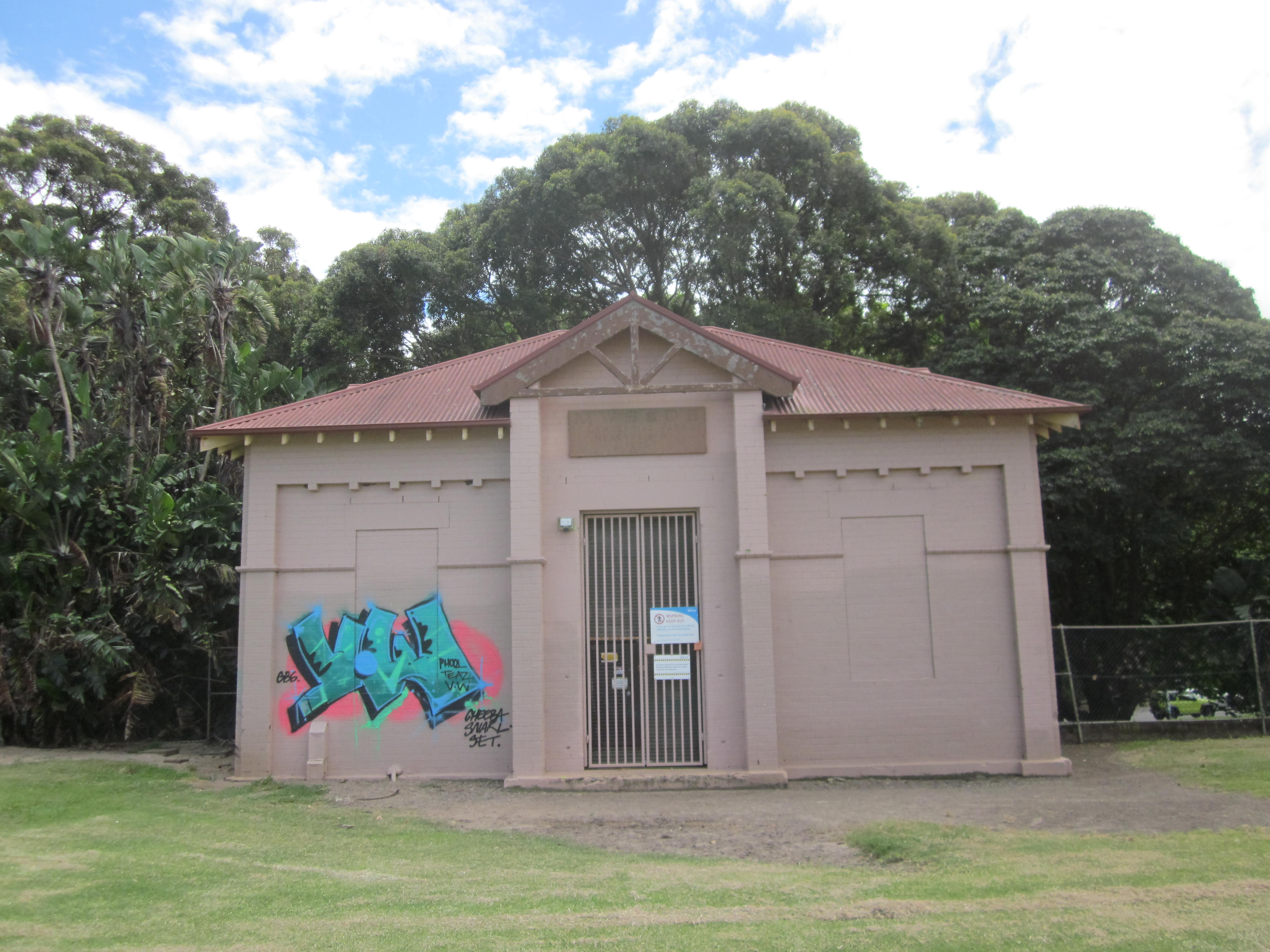
- Centennial Park Reservoir

- Location within Sydney Location within Australia
- 33°53′29″S 151°14′19″E
- Location: 3R Oxford Street, Centennial Park, New South Wales, Australia

History
- Built: 1896–1898

Site notes
- Architect: NSW Public Works Department
- Owner: Sydney Water

New South Wales Heritage Register
- Official name: Centennial Park Reservoir WS001
- Type: State heritage (built)
- Designated: 18 November 1999
- Reference no.: 1320
- Type: Water Supply Reservoir/Dam
- Category: Utilities – Water
- Builders: NSW Department of Public Works

The Centennial Park Reservoir is a heritage-listed underground reservoir at 3R Oxford Street, Centennial Park, New South Wales, Australia. It was designed and built by NSW Public Works Department from 1896 to 1898. The property is owned by Sydney Water.

A sign attached to a building on the site states that this is known as "Centennial Park Reservoir WS0023". The reservoir is adjacent to Woollahra Reservoir, which is closer to York Street. The area is enclosed by a wire fence but the enclosed area is accessible and in November 2022 a few people were walking dogs in the area. A playing field was marked out on part of the enclosed area.

== History ==
The Centennial Parklands, as it stands today, represents 190 years of colonial history. The settlers had an immediate impact on the lives of the Gadi people whose clan territory takes in most of the Sydney peninsula. Gadi country extends between what is now Darling Harbour and South Head, and includes Centennial Park, Moore Park and Queens Park

Close to where Centennial Park and Moore Park are today, an area that became known as the Kangaroo Ground was recorded on a map engraved by J. Walker in 1791 or 1793. This map shows the location of what the English called the Kangaroo Ground, in the clan territories of the Gadi. The richer soils and park like atmosphere observed here by Tench and others would almost certainly have been created through regular firing by the Gadi to keep the undergrowth clear and attract kangaroos and other large game to the area for hunting.

=== Sydney Common ===
Centennial Parklands, comprising Centennial Park, Moore Park and Queens Park, are part of the Second Sydney Common dedicated in 1811.

As the settlement of Sydney began to develop it became necessary to set aside common land on the outskirts of the town. On 5 October 1811 Governor Macquarie proclaimed the 200 hectares (490 acres) to the south of Old South Head Road as the Sydney Common, for use by the public. The common land contained a vital resource in the form of a constant supply of pure water due to the natural aquifers present in the Botany Sands system. In 1820, Macquarie set aside the water reserve in the east of the Sydney Common. Between 1827 and 1838, Lachlan Water Tunnel (Busby's Bore) was built providing a supply of freshwater to a terminal in Hyde Park. It remained Sydney Town's sole source of water supply until 1858, when it was supplanted by a scheme to pump water from the Botany Swamps, located further to the south.

=== Lachlan Swamps and water supply ===
The swamps, located within the Sydney Common, were naturally aquified and were an ideal source of water. In recognition of this precious resource, the Lachlan Water Reserve was founded in 1820. The Tank Stream supply of water for Sydney was inadequate and had a high level of pollutants, in 1825, the colonial government set up an enquiry into the use of the Lachlan Swamps to provide a water supply to Sydney. John Busby, a mineral surveyor, was appointed to design a water system to convey the water from the swamps to the town centre. Busby originally considered conveying the water using iron pipes, but assessed this would be too expensive. Finally he proposed a long tunnel be constructed, entirely through Crown Land.

=== Busby's Bore ===
The Lachlan Water Tunnel, better known as Busby's Bore, was Sydney's first piped water supply. The "Bore" or tunnel was, on average between 1.7 metres (5.5 ft) high by 1.4 metres (4.5 ft) wide and carried water from the Lachlan Swamps to Hyde Park. The whole length of the Tunnel was 3,700 metres (12,000 ft) and capable of holding 6.8 megalitres (1,500,000 imp gal) gallons and 15 days' supply of water.

Sydney Council took control of the Water Supply in 1842 and was responsible for the whole of the Lachlan Water Reserve. In 1861, it was decided that the whole of the Sydney Common did in fact belong to the people of Sydney. Common land was given to the authority of the Municipal Council. Moore Park was then laid out.

To meet increasing demands for water, portions of the Swamp were dammed in 1872, resulting in an embankment just below what is now known as Kensington ponds, and a series of seven dams throughout the swamp.

The first major development encroaching onto the Sydney Common was the siting of Victoria Barracks on Oxford Street on the north east of the common. Designed in 1838 and completed ten years later, the Barracks was strategically sited between Port Jackson and Botany Bay to prevent an enemy invasion. The soldiers soon established the Military Garden, and by 1852 they had added the Garrison Cricket ground and a rifle range on land to the south of the barracks. In 1866 the Sydney Common was given to the Municipal Council of Sydney for development under the Sydney Common Improvement Bill of 1866.

=== A public park ===
In the second half of the nineteenth century, parts of Sydney Common were made into parkland. Lord Carrington, the governor of NSW 1885–1890, advocated the city of Sydney should have a large recreational space in the fashion of a "grand park". Sir Henry Parkes, the premier, recognized the potential of this proposal and facilitated its realisation.

Charles Moore JP, the Mayor of Sydney from 1867 to 1869, worked on developing a public park for the recreation of the people of Sydney. Allotments of land alongside the South Head Road (Old South Head Road, now Oxford Street) were sold to fund the developments and soon Moore had overseen the construction of Randwick and Moore Park Roads and the creation of a public park incorporating the land around them. Charles Moore, Director of the Sydney Botanic Gardens, supplied the distinctive tree plantations.

=== Moore Park ===
In 1866 Sydney City Council dedicated 378 acres (153 ha) of the north west section of Sydney Common as a recreation ground for the public to help alleviate growing pressures for outdoor activities, particularly organised sports. The area was named Moore Park in 1867 after Charles Moore, Mayor of Sydney City Council 1867–1869. Moore Park became the focus for major sporting events and entertainment facilities with the establishment of the Zoological Gardens in 1879, the Royal Agricultural Society Showground, and the first course of The Australian Golf Club in 1882.

Queens Park was created by the Centennial Celebration Act 1887. By 1895 it contained an eleven-hole golf course which was removed to Botany in 1899. Since the 1930s Queens Park has been used as a sports field by Christian Brothers College, Waverley and various local sporting groups.

=== Centennial Park ===
The Centenary Bill was presented to NSW Parliament on 27 June 1887 introducing the notion of a park that would be accessible to the whole mass of people down to the very poorest class of the community. It would also transform what was regarded as an unsightly area into a region of loveliness and beauty. Centennial Park was created by the Centennial Celebrations Act 1887 to commemorate the 100th anniversary of the colony. This Act, however, did not define the appropriate uses of the park.

The park was established to commemorate Australia's centenary in 1888 and was opened on 26 January 1888 by Sir Henry Parkes. He stated that "this grand park is emphatically the people's park, and you must always take as much interest in it as if by your own hands you had planted the flowers, the park will be one of the grandest adornments to this beautiful country."

The newly named "Centennial Park" became the focus for the Centenary celebration preparations. Frederick Franklin, an English civil engineer, appears to have prepared the original design of the park, although historically the preservation and development of the Reserve as Centennial Park is credited to Lord Carrington, Sir Henry Parkes and Charles Moore.

The layout and landscape design of the park is attributed to Charles Moore, the Director of the Botanic Gardens from 1848-96 (but no connection with Charles Moore, Mayor). Moore enlisted the labour of the unemployed to transform the native scrubland into an open expanse of public land. James Jones, head gardener of the Botanic Gardens became the General Overseer of Centennial Park and diary entries in his Day Book indicate that he played a significant part in its construction, although his desire to conserve the native flora of the area was not fulfilled.

=== Water Supply for Sydney ===
Domestic water supply in Sydney has been a concern since the first European settlement. Prior to the 1850s, water had been supplied via natural water courses, or through Busby's Bore, which tapped the Lachlan Swamps in what is now Centennial Park. During the 1850s, the Botany swamps were tapped, with a pumping station transferring water to a new reservoir built in Crown Street, which in turn supplied Sydney's residents. Between 1859 and 1899, a series of five service reservoirs were built east of the city to supply water to Sydney and the developing eastern suburbs. The reservoirs were designed to act as regulating valves, balancing out the local supply and demand and also ensuring a satisfactory water pressure to the user. Centennial Park Reservoir No.1 was the last of the five nineteenth century city reservoirs to be constructed and was completed in 1899. In 1898, the Paddington Reservoir went out of service, as its function was taken over by the larger and more elevated Centennial Park Reservoir No.1. In 1925, the operation of Centennial Park Reservoir No. 1 was augmented by the construction of a second reservoir nearby. Circa 1930, the Tennis Pavilion, designed by architect Howard Jouriand, was relocated to Lane Cove National Park and it remained there until c. 1955. In 1974, defects in the walls led to the lowering of the FSL (Full Storage Level) by one metre until, in 1990–1992, part of the battered earth side wall was strengthened with concrete. The Reservoir is now operating at full capacity.

== Description ==
The main walls of the reservoir are of brick, with a typical gravity-retaining-wall cross section, supported in general by sloping rubble fill which is in turn covered with earth fill to give an overall slope of approximately 1 in 2 where the reservoir is in bank, and steeper where it is partly in excavation. The reservoir roof was originally covered with "coke dust" and grassed for public access, no doubt to provide Sunday afternoon strollers with an unimpeded view of the pleasant, gently undulating, Botany Valley and Centennial Lakes. The perimeter of the top of the reservoir is enclosed with a gated cast-iron fence manufactured by the Darlington Iron Works (Sydney). This, together with the central brick access tower, continues to bestow on the reservoir something of its former glory. The curtilage boundary is defined by Oxford Street and Carrington Street as the northern and southern boundaries; the west boundary is approximately a line along the projection southwards of Moncur Street and the east boundary is a line parallel to the west boundary, between the corner of Carrington Drive and Broome Avenue to Oxford Street.

The Reservoir is almost completely intact. The pavilion has been removed.

=== Modifications and dates ===
Tennis Pavilion, designed by architect Howard Jouriand, was relocated to Lane Cove National Park c. 1930 and remained there until c. 1955.

== Heritage listing ==
As at 21 April 2005, Centennial Park Reservoir No. 1 was the largest covered storage reservoir constructed in Australia at the time it was built and it remains very large even by present-day standards. It is a relic of the early development of the Upper Nepean Water Supply Scheme and the subsequent expansion of water reticulation throughout the suburban areas of Sydney. It is also associated with the rapid urban expansion of the eastern suburbs of Sydney in the late 19th century. The reservoir demonstrates exemplary engineering practices at the turn of the century in relation to design, construction methods and manual skills, particularly in regards to the vaulted arch roof. The reservoir has played a continuous, on-going role for over a century as an important facility of the water supply system, particularly for the eastern suburbs. The exterior of the Reservoir has aesthetic qualities which relate to its parkland environment and is a local landmark. The level of ornamentation evident in the structure demonstrates the importance placed upon the appearance of engineering structures in the era in which it was built. The Centennial Park Group of three reservoirs, including Woollahra Reservoir (WS 144), 1880, Centennial Park No. 1 (WS 22), 1899, and Centennial Park No. 2 (WS 23), 1925, demonstrate the development in construction technology for covered reservoirs, as well as the dramatic increase in demand in the growing Sydney suburbs. The group is unique in the SWC system, because of their size, design and level of architectural detailing.

Centennial Park Reservoir WS001 was listed on the New South Wales State Heritage Register on 18 November 1999 having satisfied the following criteria.

The place is important in demonstrating the course, or pattern, of cultural or natural history in New South Wales.

Centennial Park Reservoir No. 1 is a relic of the early development of the Upper Nepean Water Supply Scheme and the subsequent expansion of reticulation throughout the suburban areas of Sydney. It is associated with the rapid urban expansion of the eastern suburbs of Sydney in the late 19th century, following the provision of the tramway transport system and the breakup of the large estates. The reservoir demonstrates water engineering practice at the turn of the century in regard to design knowledge, construction methods and manual skills, particularly in regards to the arched roof, practices which have since been superseded by reinforced concrete. The reservoir has played a continuous, on-going role extending over 87 years as an important facility of the water supply system, particularly for the eastern suburbs.

The place is important in demonstrating aesthetic characteristics and/or a high degree of creative or technical achievement in New South Wales.

Centennial Park Reservoir No. 1 is an example of the nineteenth century practice of utilitarian enhancement with decorative presentation. The exterior of Centennial Park Reservoir No. 1 is a landscape area enclosed by decorative fencing. When empty, the forest of timber posts and vaulted arched roof is visible in the vast interior of the reservoir.

The place has a strong or special association with a particular community or cultural group in New South Wales for social, cultural or spiritual reasons.

Centennial Park Reservoir No. 1 was the site, in the early 1990s, of a public access program, instituted whilst the Reservoir was empty for refurbishment works, which attracted many thousands of members of the public, demonstrating a significant interest and value placed upon these structures by the public at large. Centennial Park Reservoir No. 1 is highly regarded by the public as represented by the National Trust of Australia (NSW), as evidenced by its identification in the National Trust Register.

The place has potential to yield information that will contribute to an understanding of the cultural or natural history of New South Wales.

Centennial Park Reservoir No. 1 contains representative examples of a range of construction techniques, materials and technologies of the late nineteenth century. It provides evidence of the expectations and planning context of the designers of the water supply system for Sydney.

The place possesses uncommon, rare or endangered aspects of the cultural or natural history of New South Wales.

Centennial Park Reservoir No. 1 is one of the few in-ground, covered water storage reservoirs of the nineteenth century surviving in Sydney.

The place is important in demonstrating the principal characteristics of a class of cultural or natural places/environments in New South Wales.

Centennial Park Reservoir No. 1 is a representative example of a large in-ground covered water storage reservoir of its period.
