= Crown Street, Sydney =

Street in Sydney, Australia

Crown Street, inner Sydney New South Wales
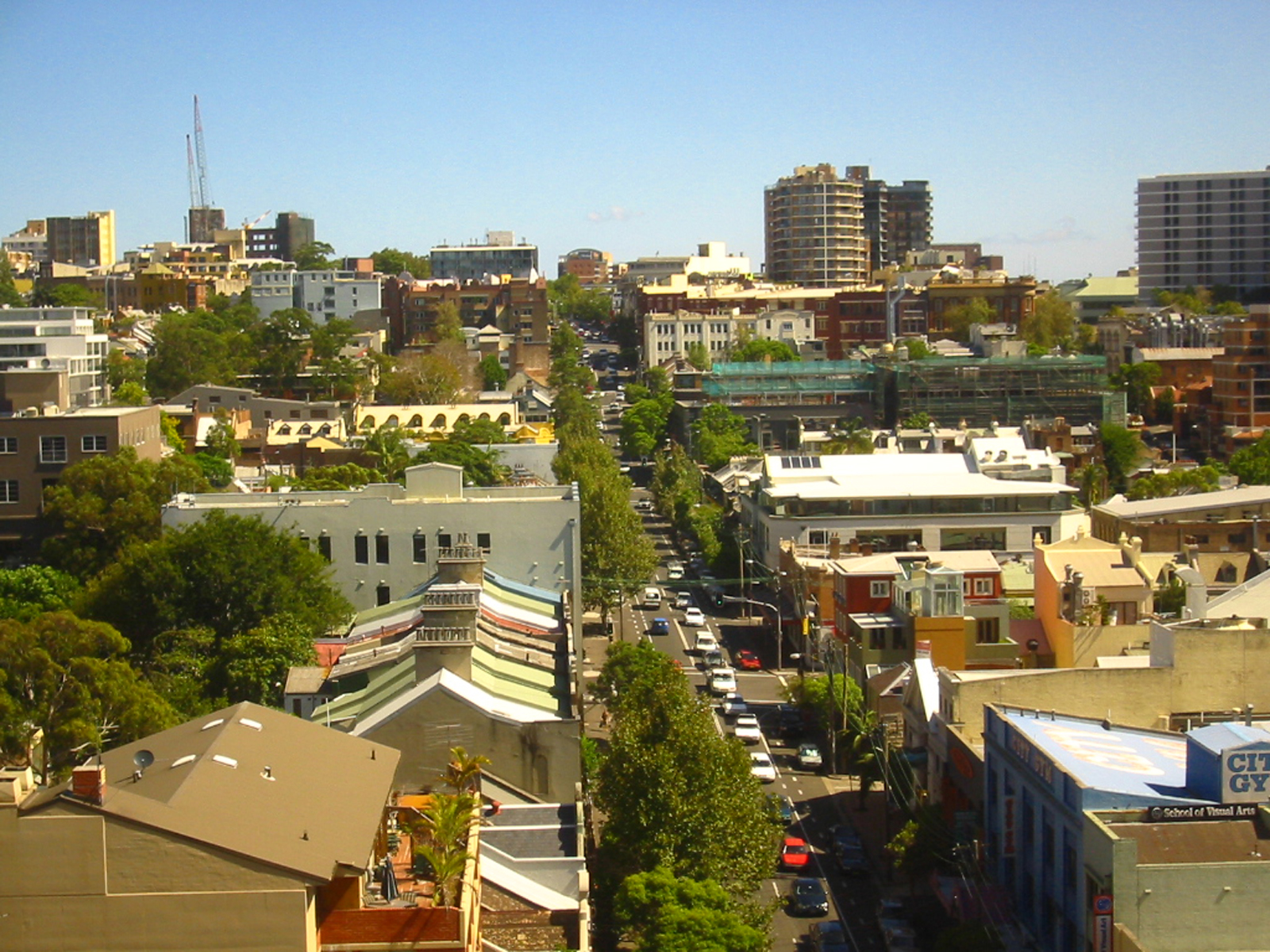
- Crown Street in East Sydney looking south
- Inner Sydney
- Coordinates: 33°52′16″S 151°13′01″E (North end); 33°53′30″S 151°12′46″E (South end)

General information
- Type: Street
- Length: 2.4 km (1.5 mi)
- Former route number: Metroad 1 (1993–1999); National Route 1 (1992–1993) (Darlinghurst–Woolloomooloo)

Major junctions
- North end: Sir John Young Crescent; Woolloomooloo
- William Street; Oxford Street; Campbell Street; Albion Street; Foveaux Street; Devonshire Street
- South end: Cleveland Street; Surry Hills

Location(s)
- LGA(s): City of Sydney
- Suburb(s): East Sydney, Darlinghurst, Surry Hills

Highway system
- Highways in Australia; National Highway • Freeways in Australia; Highways in New South Wales

Crown Street is a 2.3-kilometre (1.4 mi) street in the inner Sydney suburbs of Woolloomooloo, East Sydney, Darlinghurst and Surry Hills in New South Wales, Australia. The Surry Hills section is lined with restaurants and shops and includes the Crown Street Public School, the Surry Hills Library and Community Centre, and the White Horse Hotel.

Traffic volumes vary, depending on the segment of Crown Street. South of William Street in East Sydney, the average traffic movements in 2016 for north-bound vehicles was 5,690; while the movements for south-bound vehicles was 4,136.

== History ==
An electric tram service formerly ran down Crown Street from Oxford Street to Cleveland Street until its closure in the late 1950s. Until the opening of the Eastern Distributor in December 1999, Crown Street was a one way street in a southerly direction south of Campbell Street.

The now-closed Crown Street Women's Hospital was once the largest maternity hospital in Sydney. It opened in 1893, and was closed in 1983. The site has now been redeveloped as housing and mixed commercial use.

The Crown Street pumping station was established in 1859 to get water from the Botany Water Reserves, replacing Busby's Bore. It also pumped water up to the Paddington Reservoir, then the Centennial Park Reservoir before also supplying Waverley.
