= Kensington, New South Wales =

Suburb of Sydney, Australia

Kensington
- Suburb
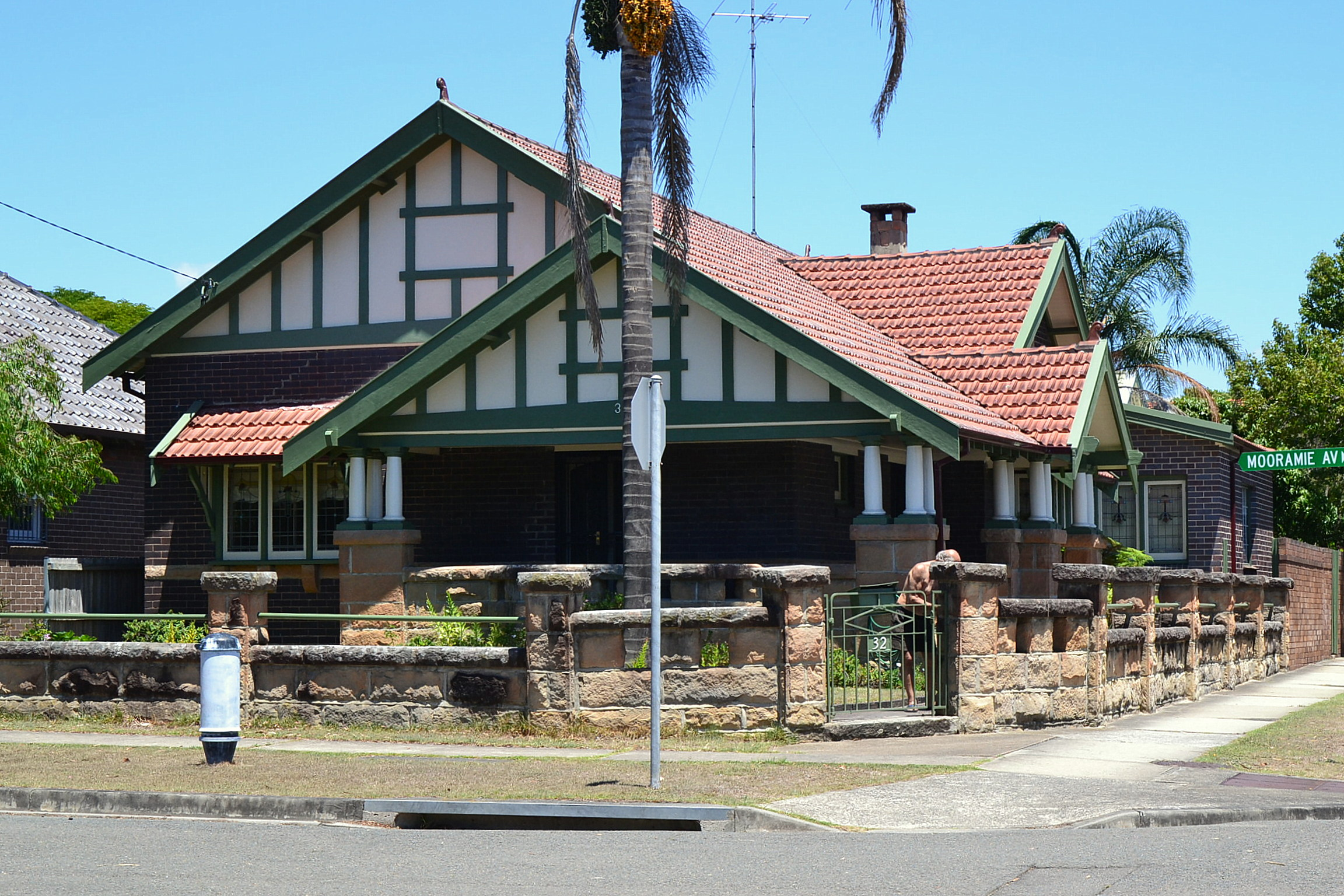
- A California bungalow in Kensington

- Interactive map of Kensington
- Country: Australia
- State: New South Wales
- City: Sydney
- LGA: City of Randwick
- Location: 4 km (2.5 mi) south-east of Sydney CBD

Government
  - State electorate: Heffron
  - Federal division: Kingsford Smith
- Elevation: 30 m (98 ft)

Population
  - Total: 11,927 (SAL 2021)
- Postcode: 2033
Suburbs around Kensington
| Waterloo | Moore Park | Centennial Park |
| Zetland | Kensington | Randwick |
| Rosebery | Kingsford | Kingsford |

Kensington is a suburb in the eastern suburbs of Sydney, New South Wales, Australia. It is located four kilometres south-east of the Sydney central business district, in the local government area (LGA) of the City of Randwick.

Kensington lies to the immediate south of Moore Park and west of Randwick Racecourse. The principal landmarks of the suburb are the main campus of the University of New South Wales, National Institute of Dramatic Art and the Australian Golf Club. Kensington is also a residential suburb close to the Sydney central business district.

== History ==
=== Indigenous inhabitants ===
Prior to European settlement, the area was inhabited by the Gadigal people, one of the salt-water clans of the Darug language group. The Cadigal people were known for their fishing skills and often travelled in canoes. The 1828 census showed some 50–60 clans of Cadigal people living by the Lachlan swamps of Kensington and surrounding areas. Swamps provided fruit, nectar, roots and tubers. Very few Aboriginals live in Kensington today.

=== European settlement ===
The suburb now known as Kensington was once called the "Lachlan Mills Estate", "Stannumville" and then "Epsom". It became Kensington in the late 1880s, starting life as an industrial suburb. Samuel Terry, the convict who became Australia's first millionaire, received a land grant in 1819. Daniel Cooper (1785–1853), also an ex-convict acquired land here in 1825 with his partner Solomon Levey, whom he later bought out. Cooper's nephew Daniel (1821–1902) planned to subdivide, but in 1865 all development was forbidden. Residential land was issued in the late 1880s, and Kensington was to be the equivalent of London's distinguished suburb, Kensington.

Kensington Racecourse opened in 1893 on the site of the current University of New South Wales. It did not compete with nearby Randwick Racecourse because it held midweek meetings, pony racing and related sports like polo. The course was also used to house troops and horses during the Boer War, World War I and World War II. Many of the first Anzacs trained at Kensington Racecourse in 1914 before leaving for Egypt and Gallipoli. It was a migrant hostel during the late 1940s. The land was resumed in 1950 to construct Sydney's second university.

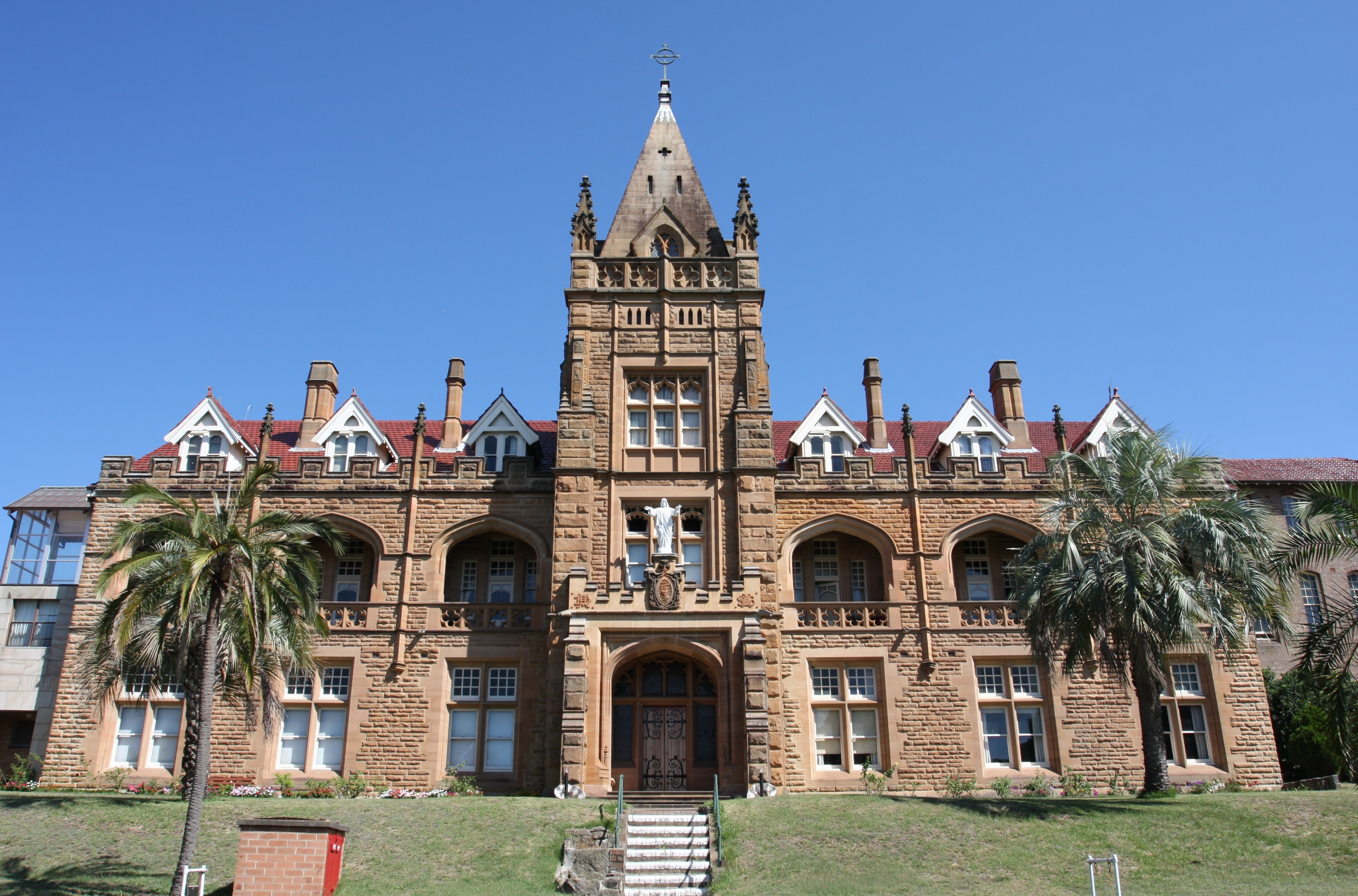
Sacred Heart Monastery

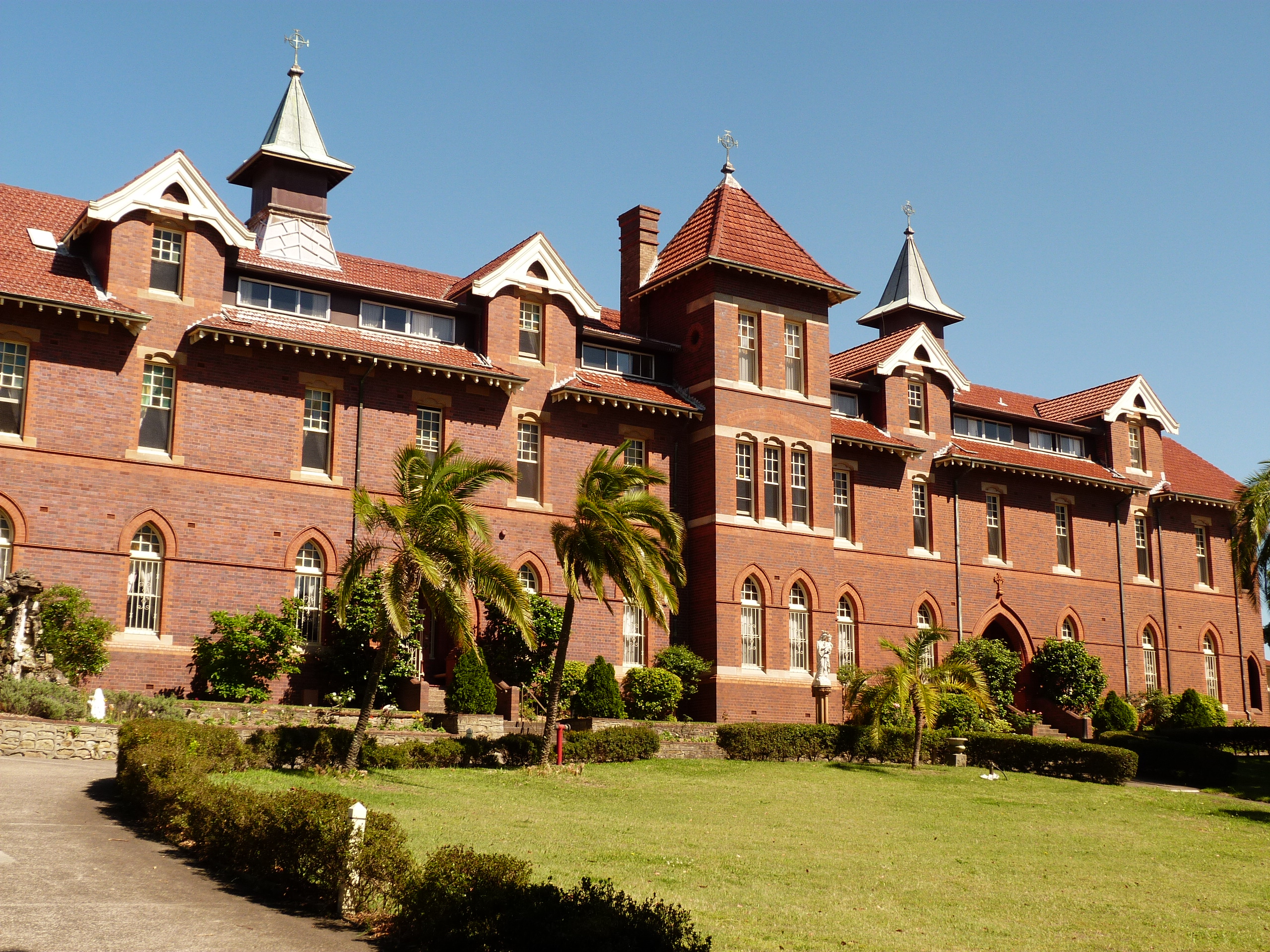
Our Lady of the Sacred Heart Convent

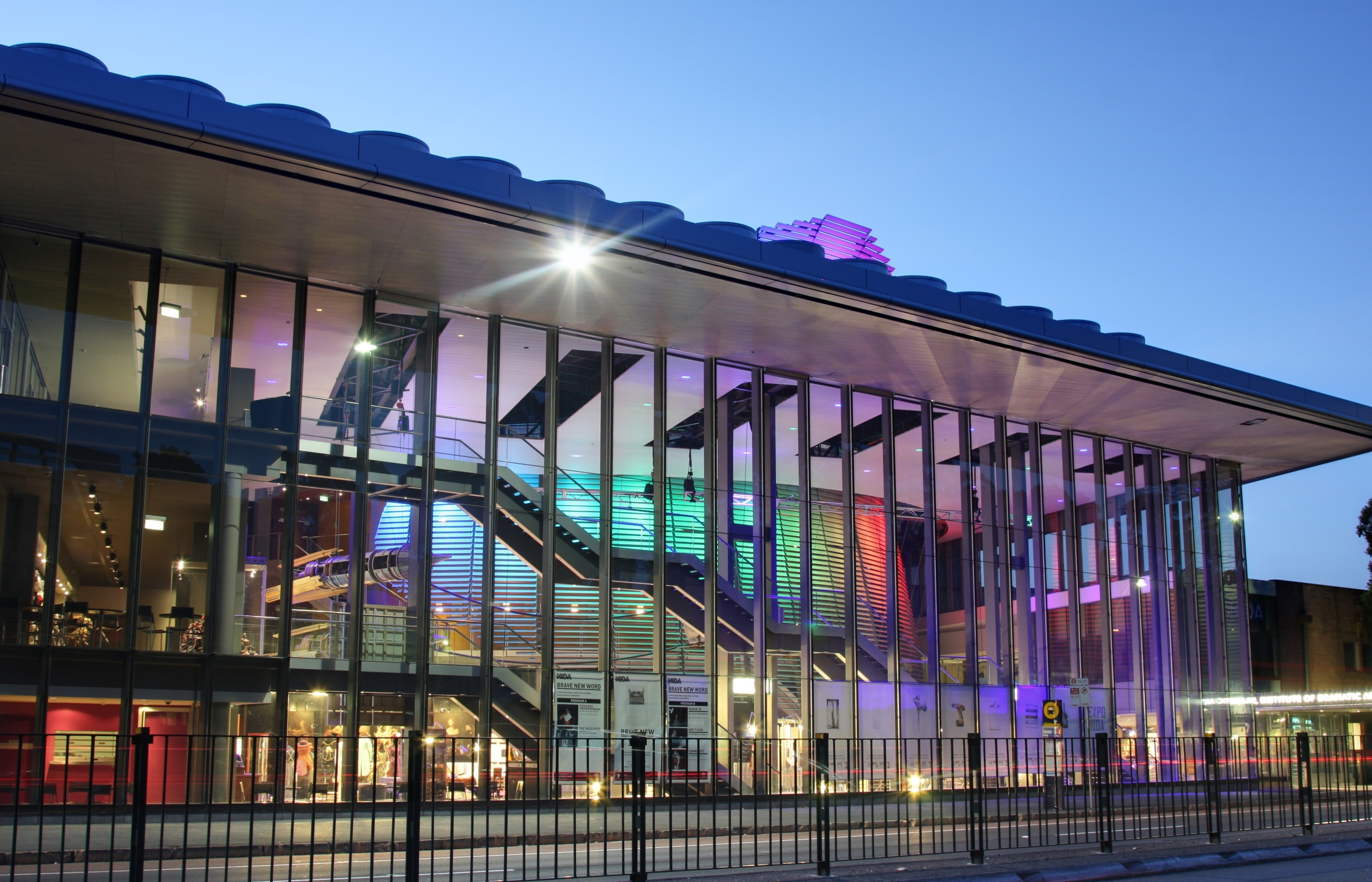
NIDA, Anzac Parade

The WD & HO Wills tobacco factory opened in Todman Avenue in 1902. The factory site also featured the Raleigh Park Social Club, an extensive sporting complex named after Sir Walter Raleigh who first introduced tobacco from North America to Europe. The factory closed in 1989 and was slowly converted into a residential neighbourhood by the Mirvac Group and Westfield in a joint venture known as Raleigh Park. The building used by the company is a two-storey brick building in the Georgian Revival style. It was designed by Joseland and Gilling and built c.1930. It was used by the Menzies Group of Companies as of 2013. It is heritage-listed.

Kensington's streets are named after local people, places in London and local flora. Some examples are:

- Balfour Lane – named after Arthur James Balfour, the first earl of Balfour, a British statesman and Prime Minister (1902–1905)
- Doncaster Avenue – named after Doncaster Racecourse in England
- Boronia Street – Boronia is a flowering shrub grown extensively in the area.

=== Sacred Heart Monastery ===
The hill that dominates West Kensington is occupied by the Sacred Heart Monastery, the Australian headquarters of the Catholic Missionaries of the Sacred Heart. The monastery was designed by Sheerin & Hennessy and built in 1895. It is a large stone building in the Gothic style and features an attic storey and a prominent central tower. It also includes a brick chapel in a Romanesque-Byzantine style which was designed by Mullane and built in 1939, and which is joined to the monastery by a matching brick cloister. The monastery is a prominent landmark which can be seen from various parts of Kensington and is now listed on the Register of the National Estate. In the mid-twentieth century, the monastery was the home of the anti-Communist organiser Dr P.J. ('Paddy') Ryan, the popular Catholic controversialist Dr Leslie Rumble, the former athlete Jim Carlton, the retired missionary Francis Xavier Gsell and the editor Fr Paul Stenhouse. The monastery published the long-running magazine Annals Australasia.

Adjacent to the monastery is the Our Lady of the Sacred Heart Convent, a brick building in Federation Gothic style, which was built in 1897. It was the original site for primary and secondary colleges that were established soon after the construction of the convent, but these soon outgrew the premises. It is now the base for OLSH Provincial House and St Joseph's Aged Care Facility, while Our Lady of the Sacred Heart College is situated next door. Across the road is Our Lady of the Rosary Church (built 1906), Jubilee Hall and the Our Lady of the Rosary Primary School, which complete a large religious complex. The convent and church are heritage-listed.

=== Tram history ===
The line from Surry Hills to West Kensington commenced as a steam powered system in 1881. At this point the line travelled along Crown Street as far as Cleveland Street. The line was then extended to Phillip Street in 1909, Todman Avenue in 1912, and then to its final terminus down Todman Avenue, West Kensington in 1937.

The line commencing from the city branched off from the tramlines in Oxford Street and ran down Crown Street to Cleveland Street in Surry Hills, then south along Baptist Street to Phillip Street, where it swung left into Crescent Street before running south along Dowling Street, tuning left into Todman Avenue where it terminated. Services operated full-time from Circular Quay, and to Railway Square in peak hours. The line down Crown Street closed in 1957, the remainder stayed open until 1961 to allow access to Dowling St Depot, (the current site of the Supa Centa Moore Park – Shopping Centre).

As well as servicing West Kensington, tram services also operated on Anzac Parade, servicing the Maroubra and La Perouse line.

Tay Park (bounded by Tay Street, Anzac Parade and Alison Road) is the site of the old Toll Bar where local maintenance revenue was collected from 1854 to 1894. The toll was 1 shilling for a four-wheeled wagon drawn by 2 horses.

== Commercial area ==
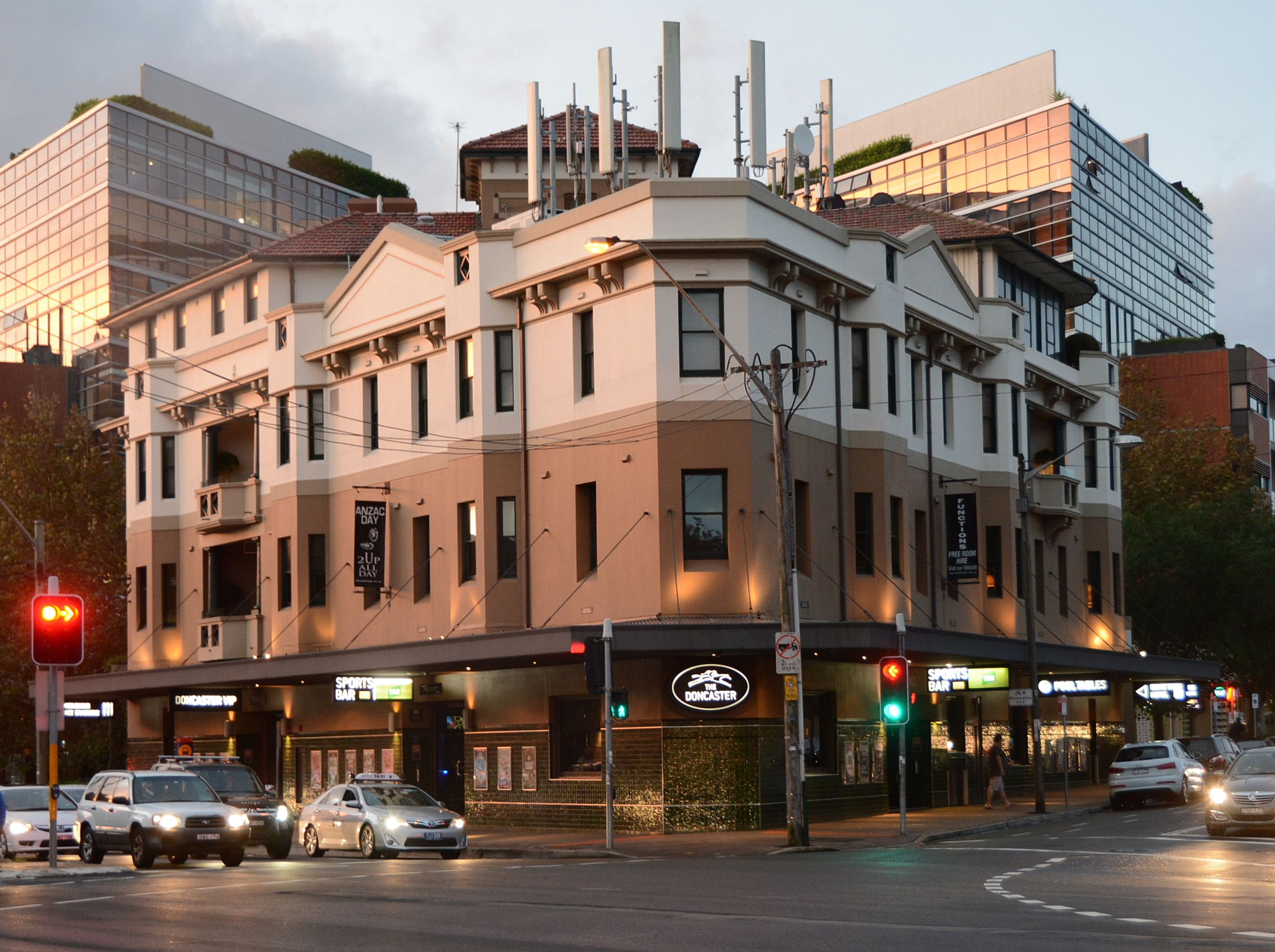
Doncaster Hotel

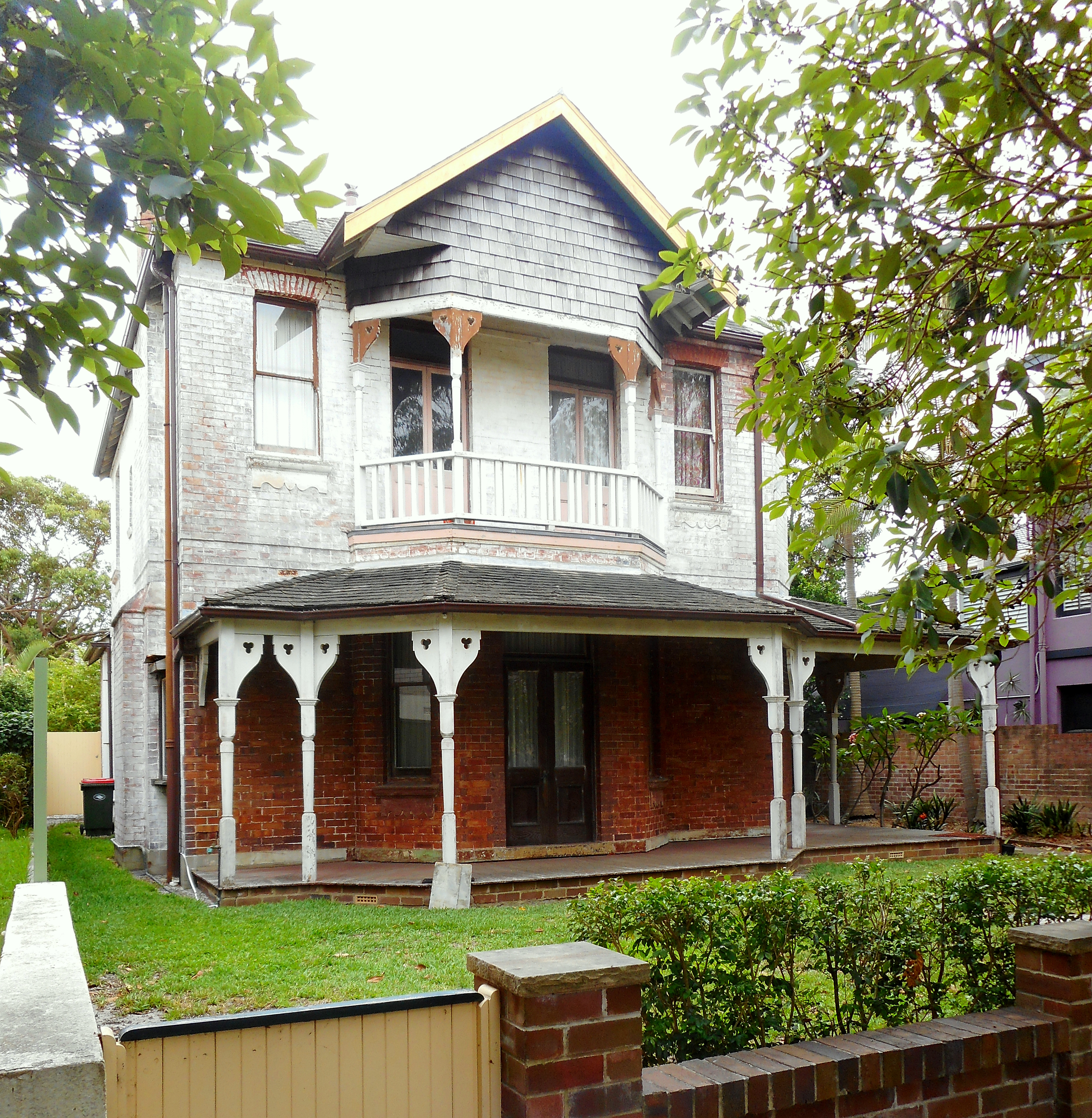
Federation house in Kensington

Kensington is heavily influenced by the University of New South Wales and the racing industry. It has a handful of cafes, restaurants and shops. Kensington has a shopping strip that extends most of the length of Anzac Parade and further south into Kingsford. Peters of Kensington is a well known retail store on Anzac Parade.

== Transport ==
Anzac Parade is the main road through Kensington. Numerous buses frequently service Kensington, linking it with the city and surrounding suburbs. A proposed extension of the Eastern Suburbs railway line to Kingsford was abandoned in 1976.

In April 2020, the CBD and South East Light Rail from Circular Quay opened.

== Geography ==
=== Topography ===
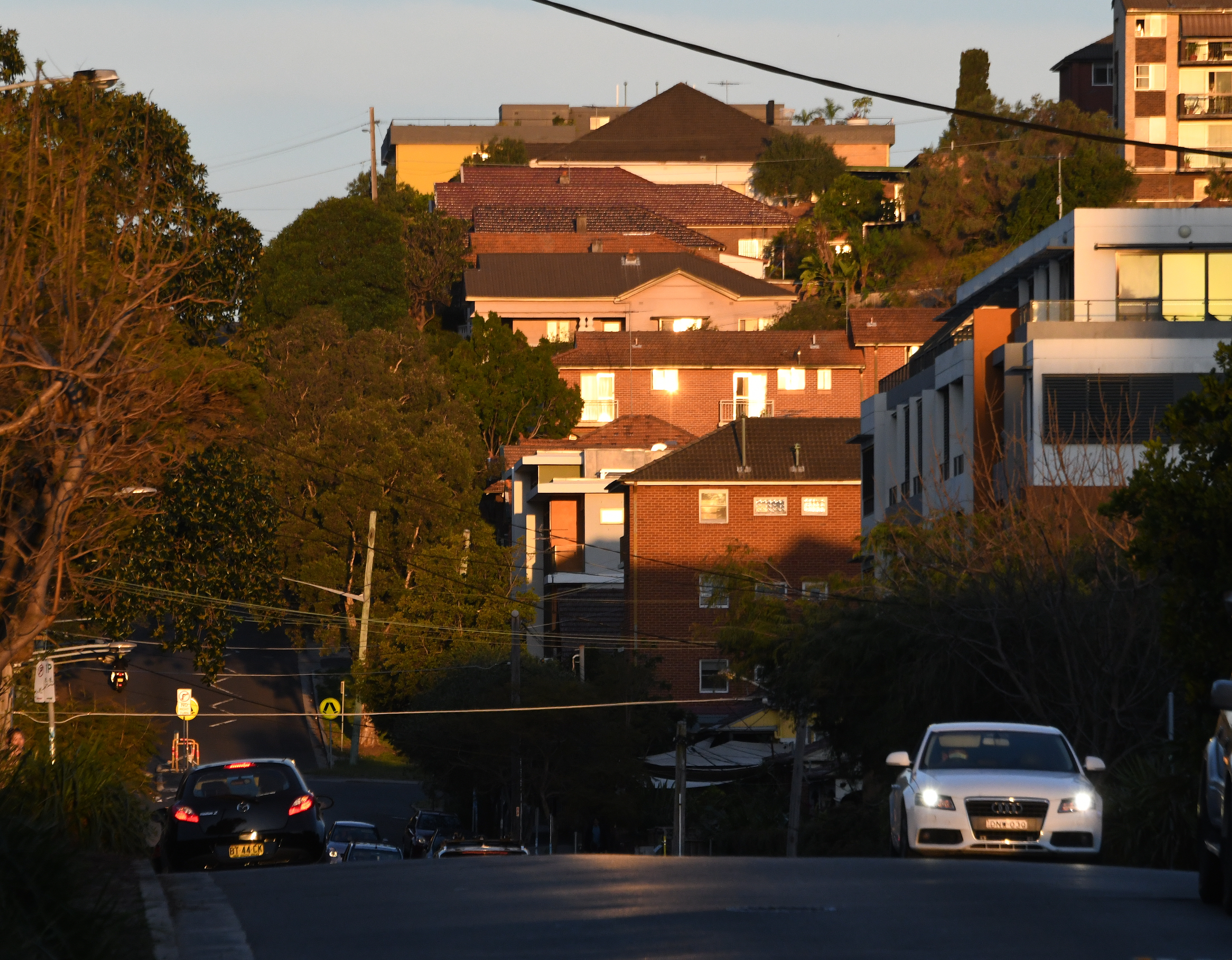
Barker Street: The terrain of Kensington is naturally rugged and hilly, but has been levelled over time.

Kensington is located in the geographic zone known as the Botany Lowlands. The sands beneath Kensington act as a large water reservoir. Originally, Kensington was quite rugged, consisting of hills, deep gullies and 768 acres (3.1 km²) of swamps, crossed by the Lachlan Stream. Evidence of the swamps can be seen in the south-west corner of the Royal Randwick Racecourse and the ponds of Centennial Park. After long periods of heavy rain some parts of Kensington are prone to flooding. Today Kensington has been levelled with hills cut down and voids filled with the excess soil from the hills.

=== Parks, flora and fauna ===
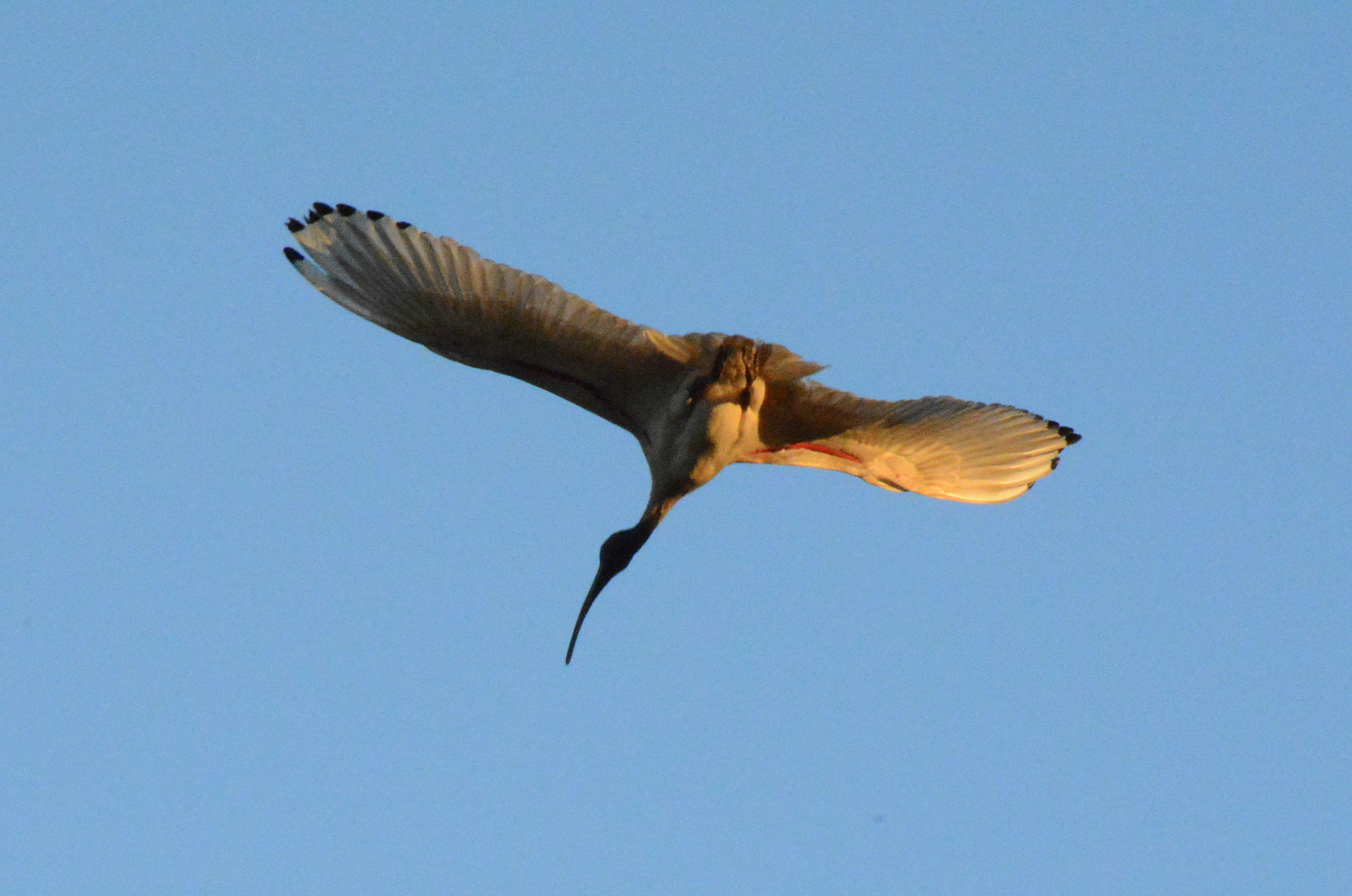
Ibis in Kensington Park

In the three square kilometres that cover Kensington, there are six parks. Banksia, Bottlebrush, Waratah, Wattles and Eucalypt are some of the approximately four hundred native plants found in Kensington. Randwick City Council has recorded approximately two hundred and fifty species of indigenous native vertebrates. Two hundred and six species of native birds have been identified since 1788. The largest park, Kensington Park, covers approximately 2.8 hectares and attracts a wide variety of birdlife, including galahs, crows, ibises and magpies.

Parks:

- Fitzpatrick Park, Day Avenue
- Ingram Street Reserve, Ingram Street
- Kokoda Park, Goodwood Street
- Raleigh Park, Brompton Road
- Wills Reserve, Duke Street
- Kensington Park, Edward Avenue

=== Water supply ===
Kensington has two natural water sources: the Lachlan Stream and an underground reservoir. Due to water restrictions and council initiatives, more residences are using bore water on their gardens. Others are installing tanks and using 'grey' water.

== Demographics ==
Historical population
| Year | Pop. | ±% |
|---|---|---|
| 2001 | 10,680 | — |
| 2006 | 10,849 | +1.6% |
| 2011 | 12,776 | +17.8% |
| 2016 | 15,004 | +17.4% |
| 2021 | 11,927 | −20.5% |

In the 2021 census, there were 11,927 people in Kensington. 49.4% of people were born in Australia; the next most common countries of birth were China (excluding Special Administrative Regions and Taiwan) 6.1%, India 2.9%, Indonesia 2.9%, England 2.8%, and Malaysia 1.8%. 55.4% of people only spoke English at home; other languages spoken at home included Mandarin 7.9%, Greek 3.8%, Cantonese 3.4%, Spanish 2.6%, and Indonesian 2.3%. The most common responses for religion in Kensington were No Religion 38.0%, Catholic 20.9, Eastern Orthodox 6.7%, and Anglican 6.3%; a further 7.2% of respondents elected not to disclose their religion.

Of occupied private dwellings in Kensington, 71.4% were flats or apartments, 21.0% were separate houses and 7.0% were semi-detached, row or terrace houses, townhouses etc.

== Politics ==
In local government, Kensington is in the West Ward of Randwick City Council. It is in the electorates of Coogee and Heffron for the State parliament; and the Kingsford-Smith electorate represented by Matt Thistlethwaite (Labor) for the Federal parliament.

== Schools and churches ==
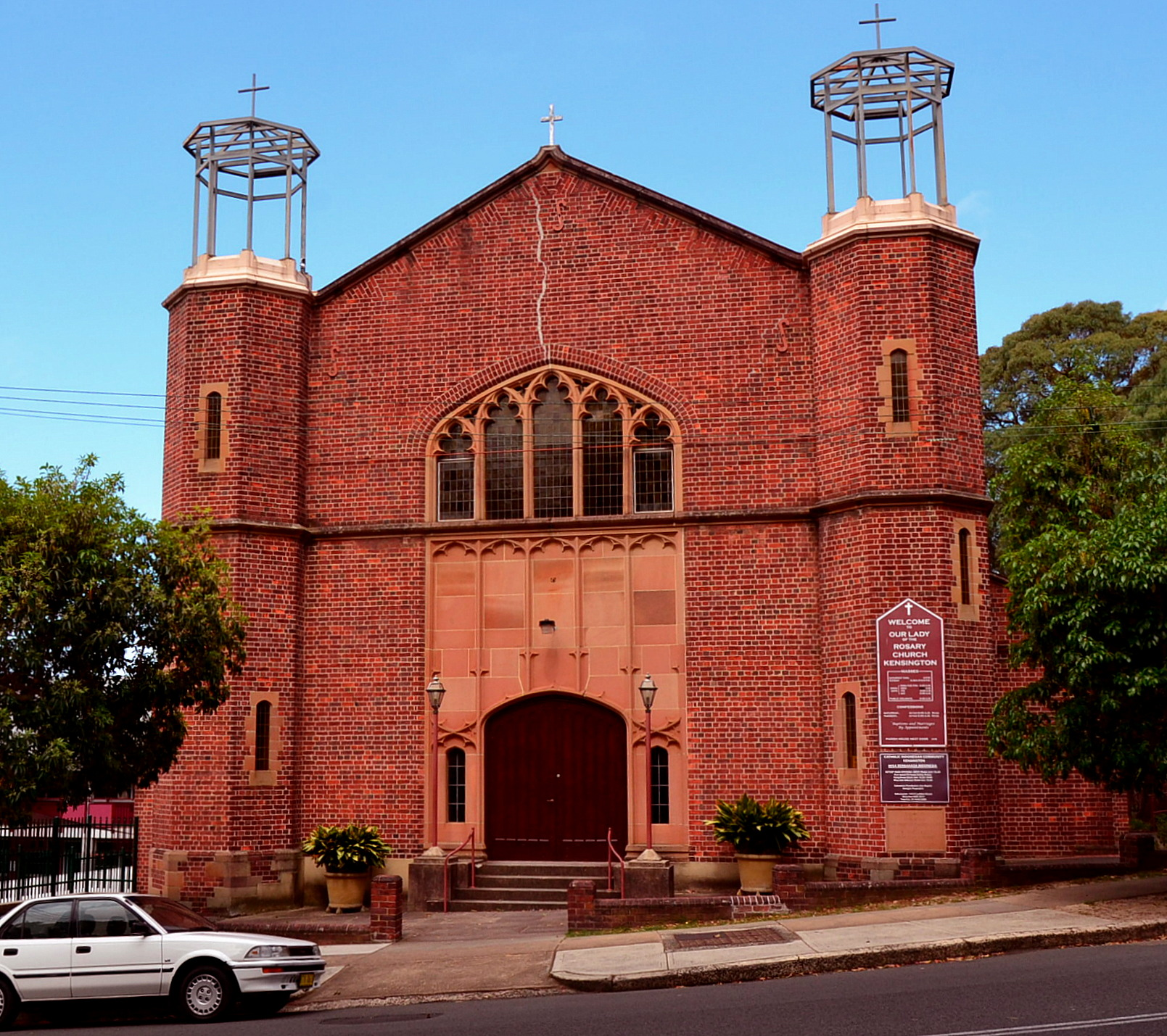
Our Lady of the Rosary Church

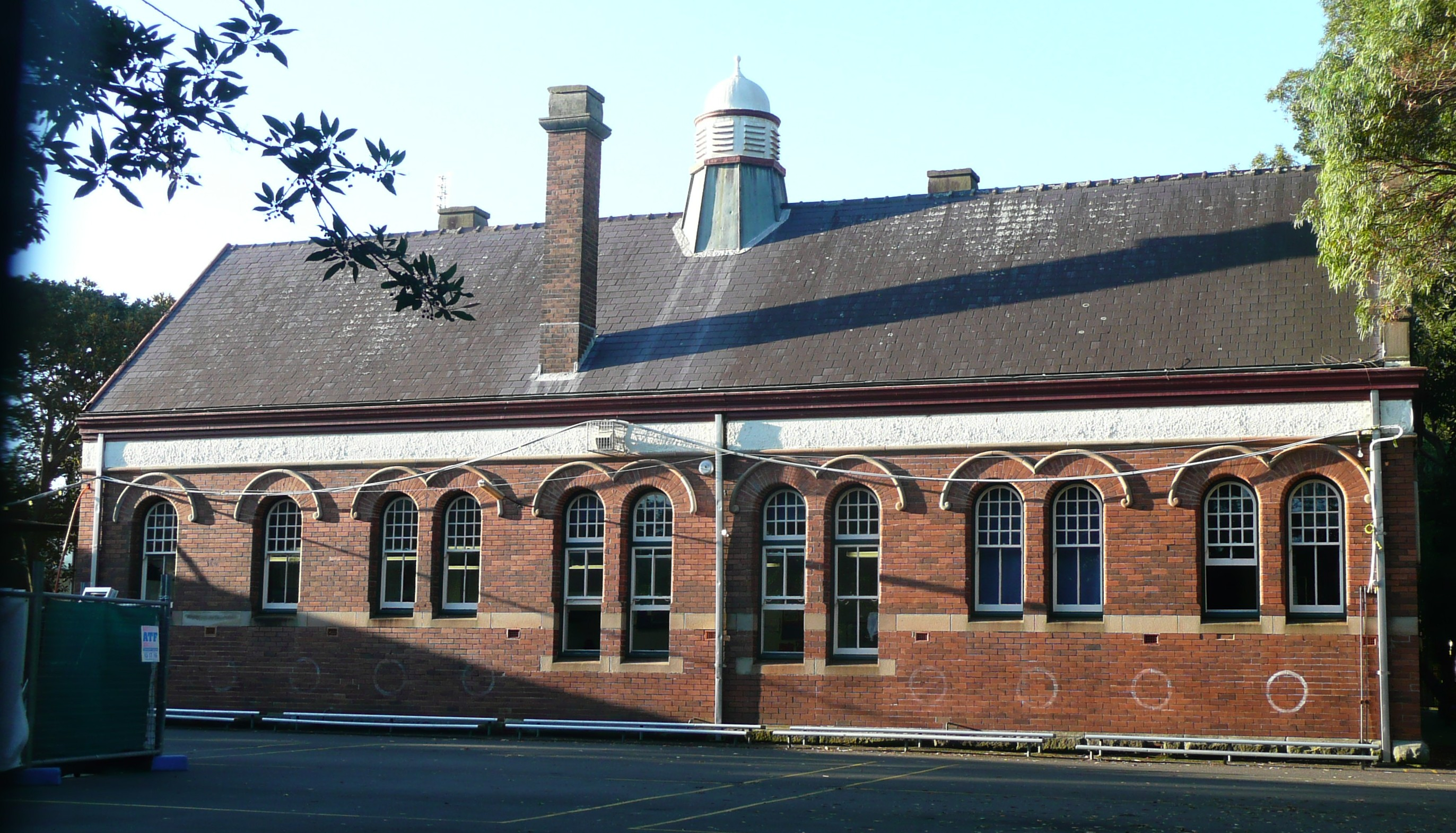
Kensington Public School, Doncaster Avenue

- Kensington Public School
- Our Lady of the Rosary Primary School
- Our Lady of the Sacred Heart College (high school)
- University of New South Wales
- The National Institute of Dramatic Art, located opposite University of New South Wales on Anzac Parade
- St Martin's Anglican Church
- Our Lady of the Rosary Catholic Church
- St George Coptic Orthodox Church
- FOCUS Indonesia Church (Gereja Focus Indonesia), UNSW Kensington Campus

== Heritage listings ==
Kensington has a number of heritage-listed sites, including:

- 85 Todman Avenue: Carthona, Kensington

Other heritage-listed buildings include:

- Sacred Heart Monastery, Roma Avenue
- Our Lady of the Sacred Heart Convent, Kensington Road
- Our Lady of the Rosary Catholic Church, Kensington Road
- Former WD & HO Wills Building, Todman Avenue
- Kensington Public School, Doncaster Avenue

== Notable people ==
- Monique Adamczak, tennis player
- Jack Aiken, politician
- John Beveridge, mayor of Redfern and businessman
- Lionel Bowen, politician
- Laurie Brereton, politician
- Patrick Dougherty, bishop
- Francis Xavier Gsell, bishop
- Brian Lawrance, bandleader and singer
- William McMahon, 20th prime minister of Australia
- Roy Rene, comedian
- Phillip Tahmindjis, speed skater
- Koru Tito, priest
- Mervyn Wood, rower and police officer
