= Archibald John Shaw =

Australian Catholic priest and radio pioneer

Father Archibald Shaw MSH

Personal life
- Born: 16 December 1872 Adelong, New South Wales, Australia
- Died: 26 August 1916 (aged 43) Melbourne, Victoria, Australia

Religious life
- Religion: Christian (Roman Catholic)
- School: Missionaries of the Sacred Heart
- Profession: Missionary
- Ordination: 1900

Senior posting
- Post: Procurator, Sacred Heart Monastery

Archibald John Shaw (16 December 1872 – 26 August 1916) was an Australian Catholic priest and radio pioneer.

== Early life ==
Shaw was born on 16 December 1872 in Adelong, New South Wales. He was the fourth child born to Catherine (née Scanlon) and Charles William Shaw. His father was born in Aberdeen, Scotland, and arrived in Australia in 1849. He initially worked as a miner and later ran a hotel in Adelong.

Shaw was orphaned as a child following the deaths of his father in 1876 and his mother in 1880. He and his siblings were raised by relatives and he attended the public school in Tumut. A childhood operation left him with a permanent limp. After leaving school he worked for periods at a timber mill and at the Goulburn Post Office.

== Missionary activities and priesthood ==
After unsuccessfully applying to join the Passionists, Shaw was sent to British New Guinea in 1894 as a lay missionary with the Missionaries of the Sacred Heart. He was stationed at the mission on Yule Island and taught English to Belgian, Dutch and French students at the seminary while undertaking his novitiate. He acted as personal secretary and translator for the mission's head Louis-André Navarre. He was formally admitted to the order in 1896, but returned to Sydney the following year to train for the priesthood under the tutorship of Francis Xavier Gsell.

Shaw was ordained as a Catholic priest in 1900 and was appointed assistant procurator under Gsell in the same year. One of his first tasks was to act as chaplain to Boer War soldiers camped at Randwick Racecourse awaiting departure to South Africa. He lived at the Sacred Heart Monastery in Sydney until 1908, when he moved to a house in Randwick. As assistant procurator he was responsible for "finding money not only to keep the three Pacific missions in food, clothing and medical supplies, but also to build convents, churches, presbyteries, dispensaries and schools".

== Radio work ==
Shaw became interested in radio as a way to raise funds for missionary activities. He may have been influenced by Father Joseph Slattery's activities at Bathurst. After studying and experimenting with wireless telegraphy for a number of years, Shaw never experimented with wireless, they priests had no money or apparatus. in 1910 he obtained a wireless experimentation licence. He subsequently constructed a 240 feet (73 m) radio tower in his backyard which was capable of transmitting messages over 2,000 miles (3,200 km).

Shaw himself wrote that he started experimenting with wireless in April 1910. He asked Kirkby to build one for him. When he started experimenting with wireless it was on the wireless set designed and constructed by Edward Hope Kirkby at his business premises at 222 Clarence St Sydney. There was no factory built at that time in the procure to manufacture anything.

Shaw's role as assistant procurator had allowed him to develop ties in Sydney's business community. He developed a friendship with Edward Hope Kirkby, who ran a business manufacturing wireless and X-ray and other medical apparatus and had patented world first fire protection apparatus manufactured by Wormald Bros. Kirkby had dissolved his partnership with Wormald Bros who were manufacturing his patented system of fire protection. Kirkby needed a factory, he asked Shaw whether they could build one, Shaw and the procurator Father Guis refused. Instead, they built it and rented it to Kirkby. Kirkby moved in with his men and his tools and began manufacturing there. In 1910 Kirkby, floated the Maritime Wireless Telegraph of Australasia with Shaw as president. The company was formed by Kirkby and his workers, Shaw held no shares. He was just the figurehead. Their factory at Randwick, known as the Randwick Wireless Works or Shaw Wireless Works, eventually had up to 170 employees. Kirkby had been studying electricity, magnetism and inductions since 1880, he had been manufacturing and demonstrating wireless since 1899. He employed other wireless experts to instal the wireless apparatus at the house Ascot. Marion Mulrony, the wireless operator on the ship Manuka trading between America and Australia, a wireless expert in his own right, and Reginald Wilkinson, who in 1910 had transmitted pictures by wireless.

The creation of Maritime Wireless coincided with the federal government's plans for a system of land-based wireless stations along the Australian coastline for shipping and defence purposes. In 1911, the Fisher government awarded Maritime Wireless contracts to establish 17 coastal wireless stations, favouring the local manufacturer over bids from the Marconi Company (represented by Ernest Fisk) and Telefunken. In 1912, Shaw was granted a patent for his airblast "spark gap" system. He was threatened with lawsuits by Marconi and Telefunken alleging patent infringement, and similar allegations from John Graeme Balsillie.

By 1914, Shaw's personal finances had become interwoven with those of the Sacred Heart mission and the Wireless Works. He soon faced a liquidity crisis, in part caused by his acceptance of payments in shares from creditors rather than cash. In response to the mission's financial difficulties, Pope Benedict XV despatched a special visitator, Robert Linckens, to investigate the situation. Linckens concluded that Shaw had technically embezzled money totalling £8,700 (equivalent to $1,200,000 in 2022) from the mission by using cheques from the Vatican to buy machinery for the Wireless Works, ultimately intending that the mission be repaid via dividends from Maritime Wireless.

With his authority from the Vatican, Linckens ordered Shaw to sell the mission's wireless assets – including the Wireless Works and Shaw's patents – in order to repay the funds he had embezzled. Shaw offered the assets to the Postmaster-General's Department for £60,000 (equivalent to $6,800,000 in 2022), but was unable to negotiate a deal. With assistance from Tasmanian senator James Long, he subsequently brokered a deal with navy minister Jens Jensen, whose department had assumed responsibility for wireless infrastructure following the outbreak of World War I. The Department of the Navy ultimately acquired the assets in July 1916 for £55,000 (equivalent to $6,300,000 in 2022).

== Death and aftermath ==
While visiting Melbourne, Shaw died of a cerebral haemorrhage on 26 August 1916, aged 43. He was buried at Randwick cemetery in Sydney.

After Shaw's death, the 1918 royal commission into defence administration during World War I found that Shaw had bribed Long to facilitate the government's acquisition of the wireless assets. Long admitted receiving a payment of £1,290 (equivalent to $100,000 in 2022) from Shaw for "services rendered" and subsequently resigned from the Senate. Jensen was also implicated in the scandal and dismissed from the ministry, although he denied receiving any payments.

== Legacy ==
Shaw Avenue in Kingsford, New South Wales, is named after Archibald Shaw.

== Sources ==
- Bartram, Graeme (2012). "Father Archibald Shaw: Australia's 'Wireless Priest'" (PDF). The Antique Wireless Association Review. 25: 101–124.
- Williams, Neville (1990). "Father Archibald Shaw and his pioneering radio factory" (PDF). Electronics Australia: 38–43.
