= Annals Australasia =

Annals Australasia was an Australian magazine of Catholic culture.

Originally titled Australian Annals of Our Lady of the Sacred Heart, the magazine was established in 1889 by the Missionaries of the Sacred Heart in Randwick, New South Wales. The first editor (though not fully acknowledged) was author and schoolteacher Mary Agnes Finn. By 2019 it was Australia's oldest continuously published magazine.

In the mid-twentieth century, it regularly provided information on Catholic missions to Aboriginal Australia, and a series of articles on "non-Catholic churches" by Dr Leslie Rumble The journal was renamed Annals Australia in the 1960s and Annals Australasia in the 1980s. It contained material on Catholic issues of a generally conservative focus, intended to appeal to students and teachers.

For most of the years from 1964 to 2019, it was edited by Fr Paul Stenhouse MSC. It was published by the Sacred Heart Monastery, Kensington.

Annals closed with the issue of December 2019, on the death of Paul Stenhouse.

A Papua New Guinea version of Annals was published from 1986, edited by Fr Adrian Meaney MSC.
