= Sacred Heart Monastery =

Sydney Catholic monastery and seminary

Coordinates: 33.9142°S 151.2203°E

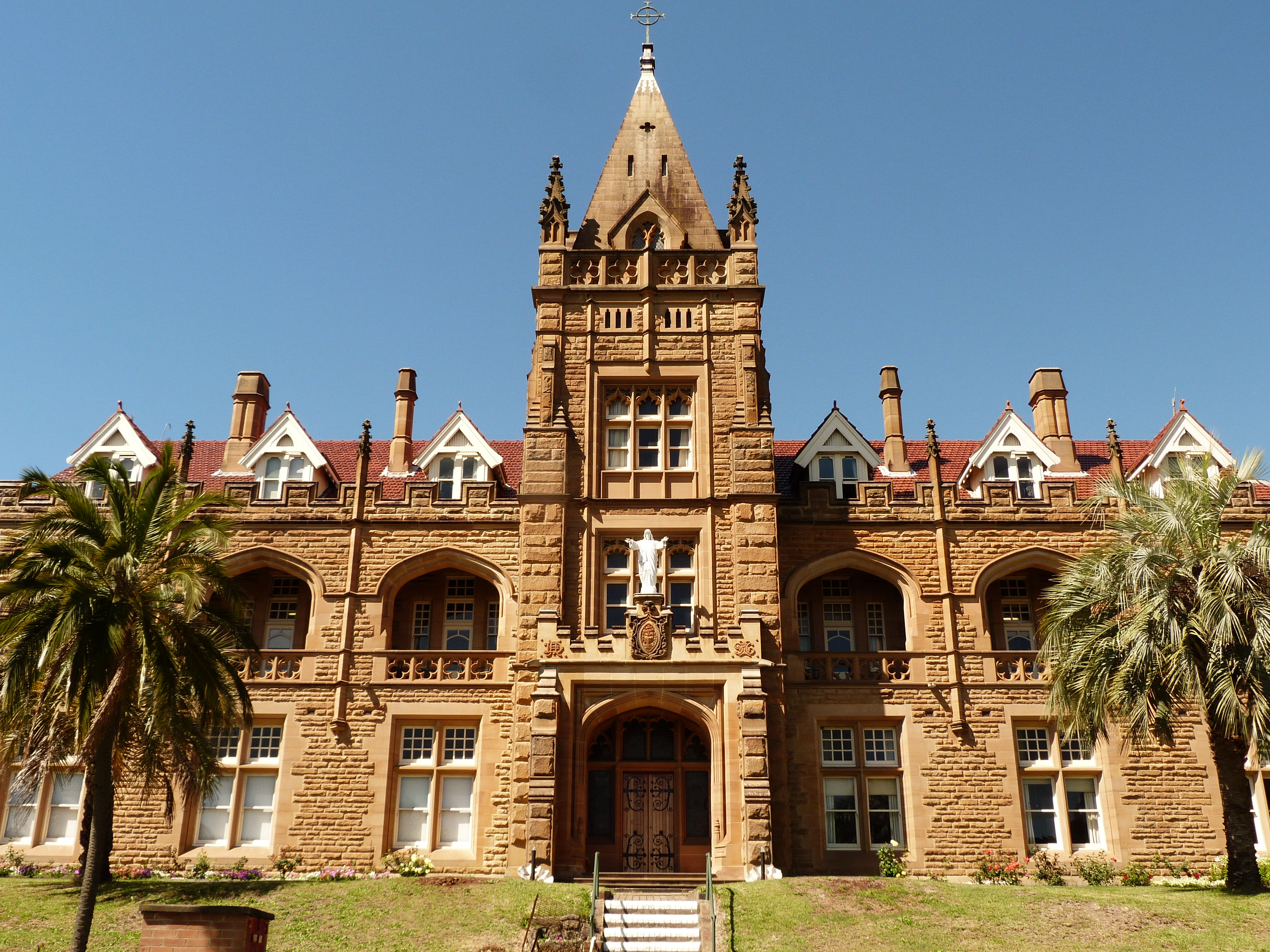
Sacred Heart Monastery, Kensington

The Sacred Heart Monastery in Kensington, New South Wales, is a monastery of the Catholic men's religious order, the Missionaries of the Sacred Heart (MSCs). Since its establishment in 1897 it has played a leading role in the Catholic life of Sydney.

== History ==
The French order of the Missionaries of the Sacred Heart had established a base in Sydney for missionary work in New Guinea in the 1880s. With the support of Cardinal Moran, they embarked on an ambitious building project on the hill that dominates West Kensington. The building was designed by Sheerin and Hennessy and completed in 1897. It is a large stone building in the Gothic style and features an attic storey and a prominent central tower. It also includes a brick chapel in a Romanesque-Byzantine style which was designed by Mullane and built in 1939, and which is joined to the monastery by a matching brick cloister. The monastery is a prominent landmark which can be seen from various parts of Kensington and surrounds and is now listed on the Australian Heritage Database.

The monastery suffered financial difficulties in the 1910s through the technically successful but financially disastrous efforts of Fr Archibald Shaw, the pioneer "radio priest" who set up a factory nearby to manufacture radios. The monastery authorities also came into conflict with their subordinate Fr Ted McGrath, who with Eileen O'Connor founded in 1913 Our Lady's Nurses for the Poor, an order committed to helping the sick poor in their own homes. Fr McGrath was temporarily expelled from the order.

The monastery acted as a headquarters, supply base and training establishment for the MSCs' far-flung missionary activities in Oceania, such as those of Fr F.X. (later Bishop) Gsell and Frank Flynn in the Northern Territory and Bishop Alain de Boismenu in Papua. Bishop Gsell retired to the monastery in the 1950s and wrote his memoir, The Bishop with 150 Wives (referring to his practice of "buying" young promised brides). The Nelen Yubu Missiological Unit published many reports and studies of the Australian missions, including the Nelen Yubu Missiological Journal (1978-2002).

From 1968 to 1998, the monastery was the site of St Paul's National Seminary for late vocations, which ordained 281 priests.

From 1998, the MSC Mission Office was established at the Monastery, reviving the work of decades earlier in supporting the MSC missions in Oceania and elsewhere. It was led for twenty years by Fr Adrian Meaney MSC.

== Personalities ==
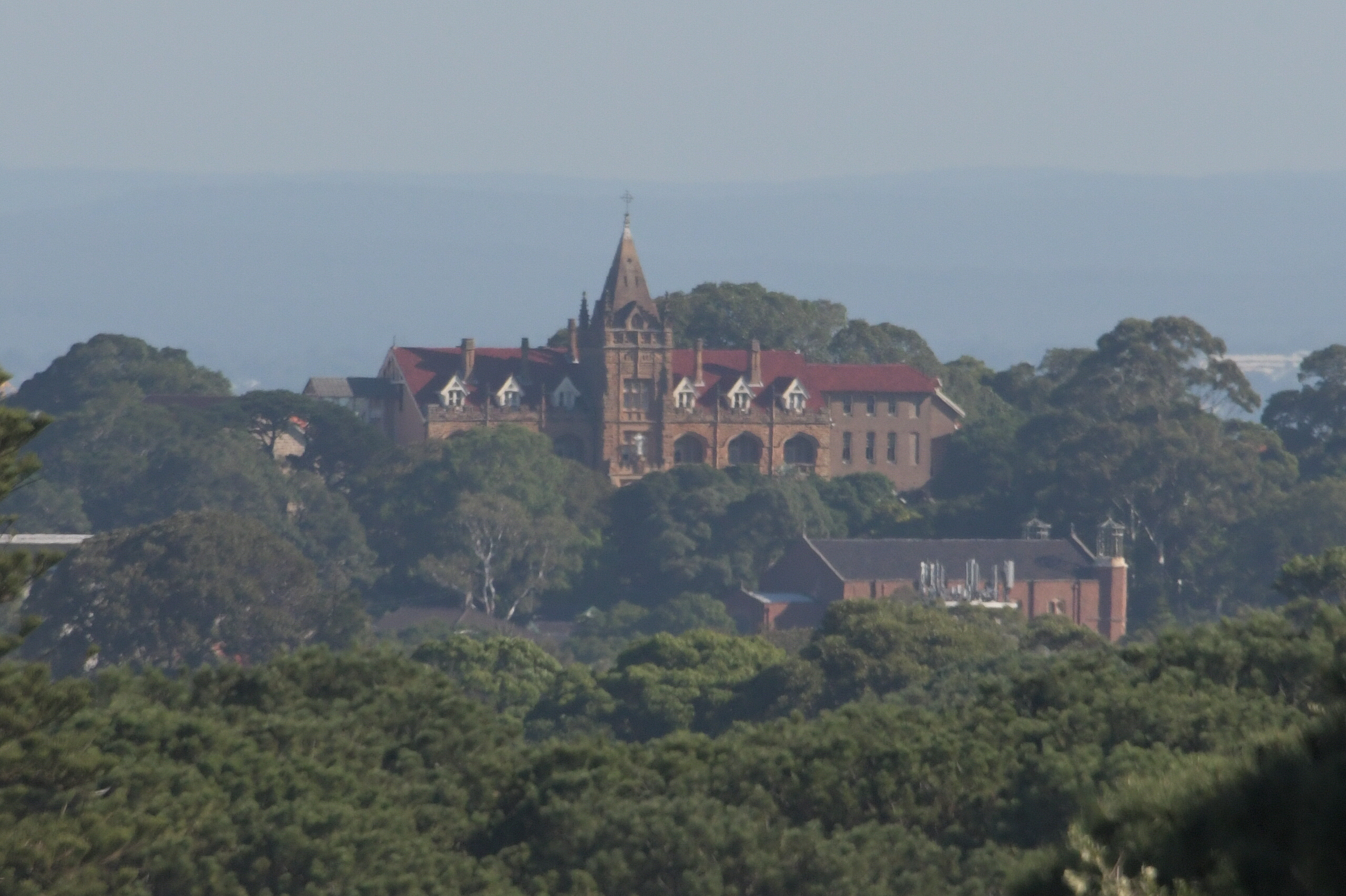
Sacred Heart Monastery, Kensington, from Centennial Park

In 1928 Dr Rumble, a theology lecturer at the monastery, began a popular Sunday evening radio programme, 'Question Box', answering queries about Catholicism. It continued until 1968 and written versions of his 'Radio Replies' sold millions of copies.

In 1932 the prominent athlete Jim Carlton entered the MSCs, forfeiting his opportunity to compete in the 1932 Olympics. He left the monastery and married in 1945.

In the 1940s and 1950s, the monastery's philosophy lecturer Dr P.J. ("Paddy") Ryan became a prominent speaker on the evils of Communism and leader in Sydney of the anti-Communist "Movement". After the Australian Labor Party split of 1955 he spoke at a large gathering of Movement members held at the monastery, successfully urging them to remain with the A.L.P. instead of joining the new Democratic Labor Party. His colleague Fr Leo Dalton also wrote against communism.

Fr Eugene James (Jim) Cuskelly, who joined the MSCs in 1941, became the Superior General of the order 1969-81 and a writer on spirituality. He was later Auxiliary Bishop of Brisbane.

Fr Barry Brundell is a leading scholar on Pierre Gassendi, while Fr Michael Fallon has published commentaries on all the books of the Bible.

Paul Collins, who as an MSC was a lecturer at St Paul's National Seminary in 1974-7, resigned from the priesthood in 2001 over a dispute with the Congregation for the Doctrine of the Faith concerning his 1997 book Papal Power. He is a prominent author and broadcaster.

== Annals Australasia ==
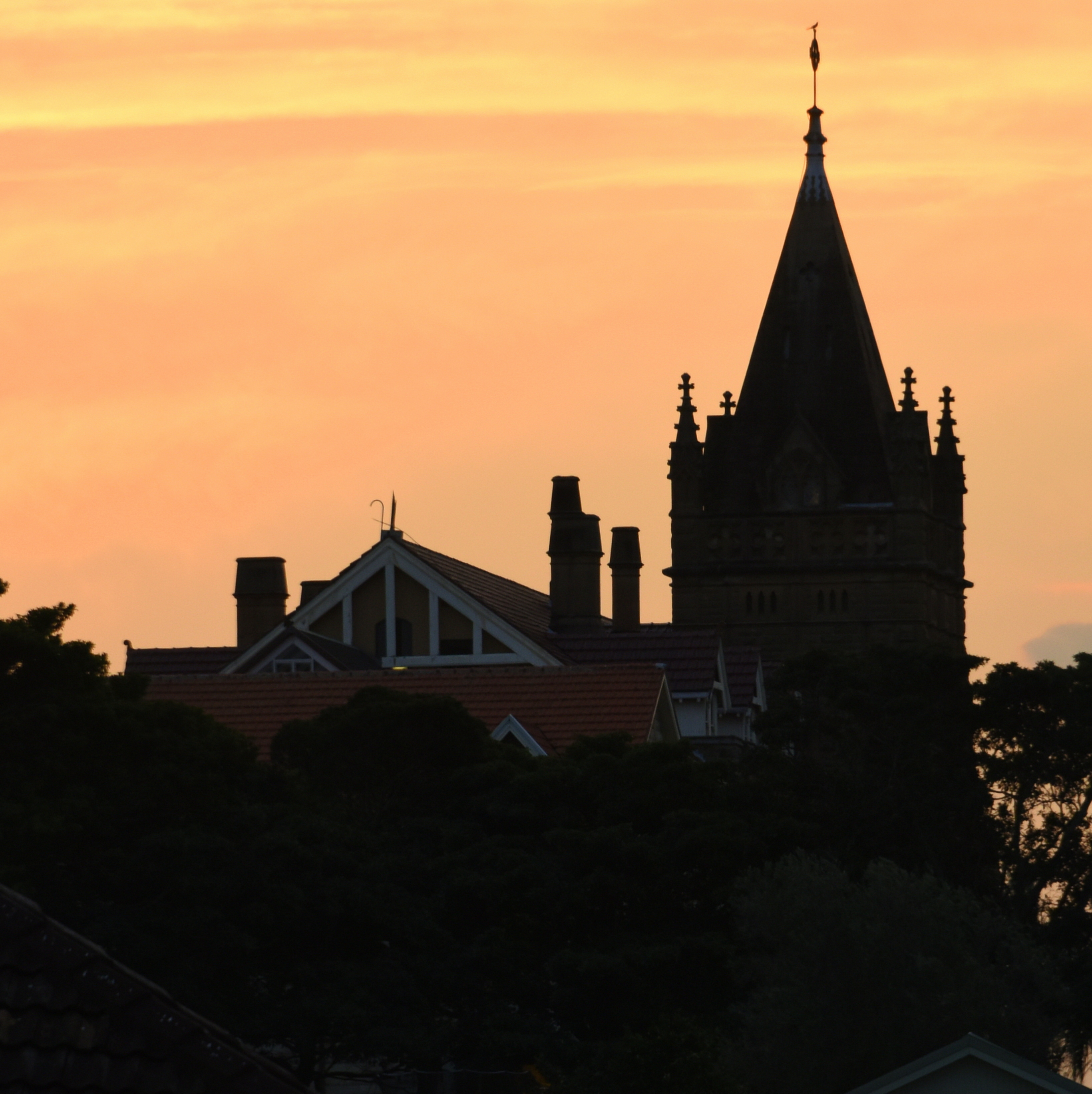
Sacred Heart Monastery, Kensington

Annals Australasia (originally Australian Annals of Our Lady of the Sacred Heart), a magazine of Catholic culture, was established in 1889 and for most of its life was published at the Sacred Heart Monastery. For most of the years from 1964 to 2019, it was edited by Fr Paul Stenhouse MSC.

Also published at the monastery was Compass Theology Review. Founded in Melbourne in 1967, it moved to Kensington in its later years before closing in 2016. Chevalier Press, located at the Monastery, has published a number of books by Australian MSCs.

== Bibliography ==
- Caruana, Anthony (2002). Monastery on the Hill: A History of the Sacred Heart Monastery Kensington, 1897-1997. Kensington NSW: Nelen Yubu Missiological Unit. ISBN 0958786941.
- Rumble, Leslie (2001). Radio Replies: Vol 1. Charlotte NC: TAN books. ISBN 9781505102598.
