= Patrick Joseph Ryan =

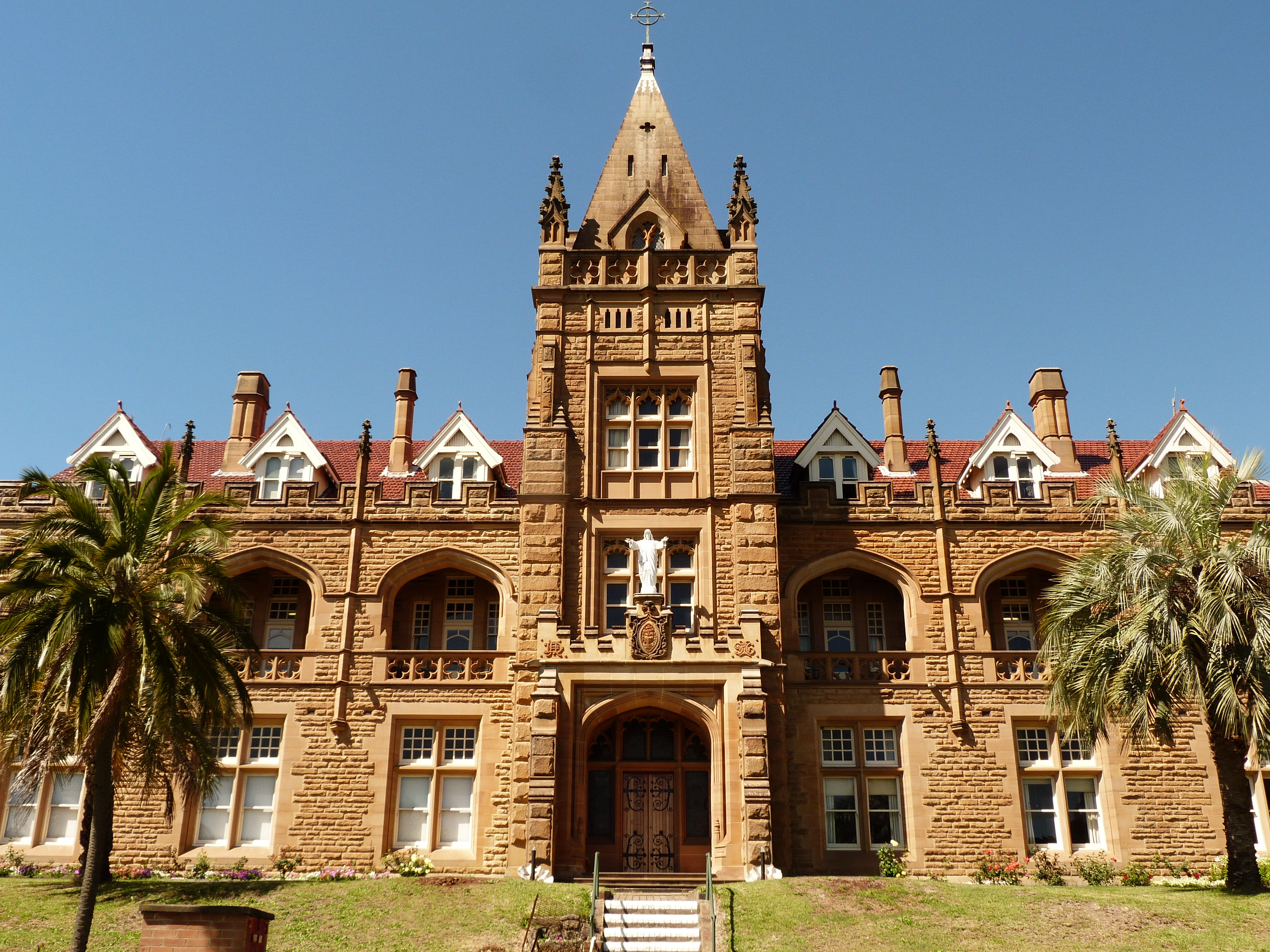
Sacred Heart Monastery, Kensington, New South Wales, where Ryan taught philosophy

Patrick Joseph "Paddy" Ryan (13 March 1904 – 18 January 1969), invariably referred to as Dr P. J. Ryan, was an Australian Catholic priest and anti-communist organiser.

Ryan was born in Albury, New South Wales in 1904 and ordained as a priest in the order of the Missionaries of the Sacred Heart in 1929. After gaining a doctorate in Rome, he returned to Australia and for many years taught philosophy at the order's seminary in Kensington, New South Wales. His philosophy was strictly neo-scholastic and he vigorously debated the atheist philosophers of Sydney University.

== Life and career ==
During 1940-01, he took over the Question Box program on radio 2SM while the regular presenter, his colleague Dr Rumble, was touring America.

He was the principal founder and head in Sydney of the `Movement', the semi-secret Catholic anti-communist organisation that struggled with communism for control of the union movement in the late 1940s and early 1950s, thus being the counterpart of B. A. Santamaria in Melbourne. After the Australian Labor Party split of 1955, however, he, like the majority of Sydney Labor supporters, followed the A.L.P. instead of the new Democratic Labor Party.

Ryan frequently engaged in polemics with Communists and Communist apologists. His most prominent public activity was a debate in 1948 in Sydney with Edgar Ross of the Communist Party of Australia on "Whether Communism is in the best interests of the Australian people." An audience of 30,000 heard a vigorous debate. Communist Party president Lance Sharkey replied to Ryan's attacks. Ryan's many anti-Communist speeches in the next few years helped create the strong Australian Catholic tradition of anti-communism.

He was vigorous in exposing organisations suspected of being Communist-led

1. Eureka Youth League
2. Union of Australian Women (formerly New Housewives Association)
3. Australian Russian Society (originally Friends of the Soviet Union)
4. Australian Peace Council (organisers of Communist Peace Drive in Australia)
5. League for Peace in the Pacific (formerly Committee Against Japanese Rearmament)
6. Democratic Rights Council (set up to counter the Communist Party Dissolution Bill. Its counterpart in Victoria was the Civic Liberties Association)
7. Fellowship of Australian Writers
8. Freelance Journalists Association
9. New Theatre League
10. Studio of Realist Art
11. Realist Film Association
12. Atlas Greek Club
13. Italia Libera — published Il Risveglio ("The Awakening")
14. Australia-China Association
15. Committee for Better Marketing
16. Gratuity Revaluation Committee
17. New Deal for Education (sponsored by the Teachers' Federation)

Also communist-controlled unions and the Queensland branch of the Legion of Ex-Servicemen

== Personal ==
In 1943 Ryan accidentally shot and killed a man he mistook for a rabbit; the coroner found he was blameless. He died in 1969.
