= Theresa (Cissie) McLaughlin =

Australian Catholic nun

Mother Theresa Anne McLaughlin BEM (1890-1965), usually called "Cissie", was an Australian Catholic religious sister who succeeded Eileen O'Connor as leader of the charitable society, Our Lady's Nurses for the Poor. She established the work on firm foundations as it expanded and secured for it formal recognition from the Church.

== Early life and education ==
Theresa McLaughlin was born in 1890 to a poor farming family in Sodwalls, in the Central West of New South Wales. In 1900 her father died and she and a sister were sent to board at Rosebank College in Sydney, run by the Sisters of the Good Samaritan, where their aunt was superior. After leaving school McLaughlin worked for a time in the Post Office.

== Work with Eileen O'Connor ==
In 1913 she met Eileen O'Connor, who with Fr Ted McGrath, was in the process of founding a society of women to look after the sick poor of Sydney in their own homes. She was very impressed with Eileen's holiness and devotion to the work for the poor and became the first woman to join the group. At the society's home in Coogee, McLaughlin became Eileen's closest companion. As Eileen was severely disabled and Fr McGrath clashed with his superiors with the result that he was temporarily expelled from his order, McLaughlin's practical skills became essential to the continuance of the work. When Eileen and Fr McGrath visited Rome in 1915 to appeal against his sentence, McLaughlin was left in charge of the work, and as Eileen's health failed, McLaughlin assumed more responsibilities.

== Superior of Our Lady's Nurses for the Poor ==
When Eileen died aged 28 in 1921, McLaughlin was executor of her will and was left as leader of the society. She retained that role until her death, overseeing the order's expansion and working tirelessly to gain official recognition from the church. She oversaw a new chapel in 1932 and major building additions in 1940. In 1953 Our Lady's Nurses for the Poor was recognised by Cardinal Gilroy as a Diocesan Religious Congregation. McLaughlin was elected superior and oversaw the expansion of the work to Brisbane (1956) and Newcastle (1962).

In later life she was remembered as "angelic, serene, very introspective". She died in 1965.

At the time of her death she was to be awarded a British Empire Medal.

== Books ==
- 2019, Jocelyn Hedley, Hidden in the Shadow of Love: The story of Mother Theresa McLaughlin and Our Lady's Nurses for the Poor, Strathfield, St Paul's, ISBN 9781925494372
