= Eileen O'Connor =

Australian Roman Catholic nun

Servant of God Eileen O'Connor
- Born: 19 February 1892; Richmond, Melbourne, Australia
- Died: 10 January 1921 (aged 28); Coogee, Australia

Eileen Rosaline O'Connor (19 February 1892 – 10 January 1921) was an Australian Roman Catholic and the co-founder of the Society of Our Lady's Nurses for the Poor, a religious congregation, also known as "the brown nurses", to provide free nursing services to the poor. Eileen suffered from a severe curvature of the spine and was – at best – 115 cm (3 ft 9 in) tall, although for much of her life she could not stand or walk. It is now known that she suffered from spinal tuberculosis (TB) and transverse myelitis (an inflammation of the spinal cord). It was through her own hardship that the idea of founding a nursing congregation for the poor came to mind. Both she and her fellow co-founder Fr Ted McGrath faced initial difficulties in recruiting others to the congregation but in the end managed to grow a congregation of religious sisters who were dedicated to their vision of care for the poor. But allegations of misconduct between McGrath and O'Connor – later quashed – prevented McGrath's return to Australia which left O'Connor in the position of leading the group of nurses.

O'Connor had been lauded as a saint in the decades after her death and there were calls for her beatification process to be introduced. Initial steps were taken in 1974 and additional steps in 2018 in order to launch the official investigation into her reputation for holiness.

== Life ==
Eileen Rosaline O'Connor was born in 1892 in the Richmond suburb of Melbourne to Charles Fergus O'Connor and Annie Kilgallin. She may have had TB from birth which is why she was still in a pram in 1895, which she fell out of, and her spine was damaged. This meant that she spent most of her life in a wheelchair. Despite several operations, no cure could be found to alleviate her constant pain. It was sometime later that radiologists discovered that her spine was at an abnormal angle that would prevent her from ever being able to walk again.

O'Connor attended the Richmond parish school on occasions when her condition allowed for it and had few friends growing up. In 1902 the O'Connors moved to Surry Hills, then Redfern in inner city Sydney. In 1911, Eileen's father died, forcing the family into a state of financial hardship. Soon after the family was introduced to Fr Timothy Edward McGrath from the Missionaries of the Sacred Heart, priest in charge for Coogee (which was not a parish at the time). McGrath noted O'Connor often lapsed into unconsciousness during intense bouts of pain and noted that he felt on some occasions she would die due to the sheer pain she experienced. O'Connor even claimed to have had a Marian apparition sometime in her teens in which the Virgin Mary encouraged her to accept her pain for the good of others.

O'Connor told McGrath of her reputed encounter with the Virgin Mary while McGrath shared with her his desire to found a congregation dedicated to the nursing of the poor. The two decided to see that vision achieved.

Despite her condition, O’Connor proved to be an indefatigable organiser and teacher whose love and faith-inspired her own and later generations of nurses. On 15 April 1913 in Coogee, the pair co-founded the Brown Nurses with the aim of that religious congregation being able to serve the sick and poor as well as the destitute in their homes and on the streets. The two launched the community at their rented house in Coogee but this venture did not prosper when all the recruits save for her left the house. But it soon expanded.

But great difficulties faced the pair going forward after some Sacred Heart Missionaries alleged that there existed an improper relationship between McGrath and herself. This led to McGrath being prevented from officiating as a priest. McGrath appealed to Rome and she – with the aid of a nurse – accompanied him there and to London in 1915 to support his case since she too was involved and named in the allegations. The pair also met Pope Benedict XV who ruled in McGrath's favour and reinstated him. But McGrath was not permitted to return to Australia for around three decades. McGrath was likewise ordered to cease involvement with the congregation while she herself was threatened with ex-communication if she proceeded with legal action for defamation.

O'Connor died in 1921 in New South Wales from spinal tuberculosis and her maternal uncle presided over her funeral. Her remains were interred in Randwick but were later exhumed and transferred in 1936 to her old bedroom that had been converted into a chapel; her remains were found in a state of perfect preservation after the sealed lead casket and the inner pine lid were removed. Her remains were found in a blue gown with her hair still intact though the skin appearing off-colour.

The work of the congregation was continued and expanded by O'Connor's successor, Theresa (Cissie) McLaughlin, and official recognition of Our Lady's Nurses for the Poor as a religious congregation came in 1953.

== Beatification process ==
In 1974, the congregation sent a letter to Cardinal James Freeman asking for approval to instigate proceedings for the beatification process of O'Connor. Freeman made no move to launch the cause but Cardinal Edward Bede Clancy in 1990 allowed for initial work to be done that could contribute to the cause. On 21 March 2018, the Archbishop of Sydney Anthony Fisher appointed the Roman priest Anthony Robbie as postulator for the cause. On 10 October 2019, Archbishop Fisher published his edict to petition the cause of beatification. Calling upon any and all of the faithful of Sydney who may have useful information regarding the Servant of God, to bring such information to his attention. On 20 February 2020, the Mass to officially open the cause for beatification was held at St Mary's Cathedral in Sydney. Documentation was delivered to Rome in late 2024.

== Books ==
- Boland, T P (1991). Eileen O'Connor: For the poor and the poor only. Homebush NSW: St Paul's. ISBN 1875570004.
- Oswin McKinney (1992). A Remarkable Life: Eileen Rosaline O'Connor 19.2.1892 – 10.1.1921. Coogee NSW: Our Lady's Nurses for the Poor.
- McMahon, John F (1996). Eileen O'Connor and Our Lady's Nurses for the Poor. Waverley NSW: Waverley Press. ISBN 0731631528.
- Hosie, John (2004). Eileen: The Life of Eileen O'Connor, Foundress of Our Lady's Nurses for the Poor. Strathfield NSW: St Paul's. ISBN 1876295805.
- O'Connell, Mary (2009). Our Lady of Coogee: Eileen O'Connor and the founding of Sydney's Brown Nurses. Darlinghurst NSW: Crossing Press. ISBN 9781876906054.
- Hedley, Jocelyn (2011). And Here Begin the Work of Heaven: The spirituality of Eileen O'Connor, co-founder of Our Lady's Nurses for the Poor. Strathfield NSW: St Paul's. ISBN 9781921472862.
- Hedley, Jocelyn (2019). Hidden in the Shadow of Love: The story of Mother Theresa McLaughlin and Our Lady's Nurses for the Poor. Strathfield NSW: St Paul's. ISBN 9781925494372.
- Ditesa, Rob (1999) updated (2018). Eileen O'Connor – A Saintly Inspiration. Randwick NSW. News Diary ISBN 978-0-646-59765-2
- Lightbody, Dolores (2021). Eileen O'Connor – Little Mother from Down Under. Strathfield St Paul's. ISBN 978-1-925494-67-9
