= Ted McGrath =

Australian Catholic priest and cofounder of religious order

Timothy Edward McGrath (1881–1977) was an Australian Catholic priest and with Eileen O'Connor the founder of Our Lady's Nurses for the Poor religious order.

== Early life ==
McGrath was born in Bungeet near Benalla in north-east Victoria in 1881 to a poor rural family of Irish descent. Both his parents died by the time he was seven and his education was severely limited. Despite this background he was accepted into the Missionaries of the Sacred Heart order and ordained a priest by Cardinal Moran in 1909. He was appointed the first priest in charge of the new parish of Coogee in Sydney's eastern suburbs.

== Work with Eileen O'Connor ==
He met a young woman, Eileen O'Connor, who was severely physically disabled by spinal problems, and was deeply impressed with her holiness. Together they determined to found a group of religious women who would care for the sick poor in their own homes. On 15 April 1913 in Coogee the pair co-founded Our Lady's Nurses for the Poor. McGrath acted as chaplain and organiser since at this time O'Connor could not walk.

Following allegations of scandal, McGrath's superiors at the Sacred Heart Monastery, Kensington, ordered him to break off contact with O'Connor. He refused and was expelled from the order. He and O'Connor travelled to Rome in 1915 to appeal the decision. He was readmitted to the order but forbidden to return to Australia.

Despite these difficulties the order was firmly established by the time of O'Connor's death in 1921.

== Later life ==
McGrath served as a chaplain with the British Army on the Western Front in 1918. On 28 September, near Wailly-Beaucamp in northern France, he went forward under heavy fire to rescue a wounded officer in no-man's-land. He was awarded a Military Cross.

After serving in Wichita and elsewhere in the US and Europe, he was finally allowed by his superiors to return to Australia in 1941. In 1969 he retired to Our Lady's Home in Coogee and died there in 1977, aged 95.

== Bibliography ==
- Hosie, John (2010). A Lonely Road: Fr Ted McGrath M.S.C.: A Great Australian. Hindmarsh SA: ATP Press. ISBN 9781921511899.
- McGrath, Ted (1988). O'Hea, Ruth (ed.). The Collected Poems of Timothy Edward McGrath M.S.C. Coogee: Our Lady's Nurses for the Poor. ISBN 0731643593.
