= John Farrell (Australian poet) =

Australian poet, brewer and journalist

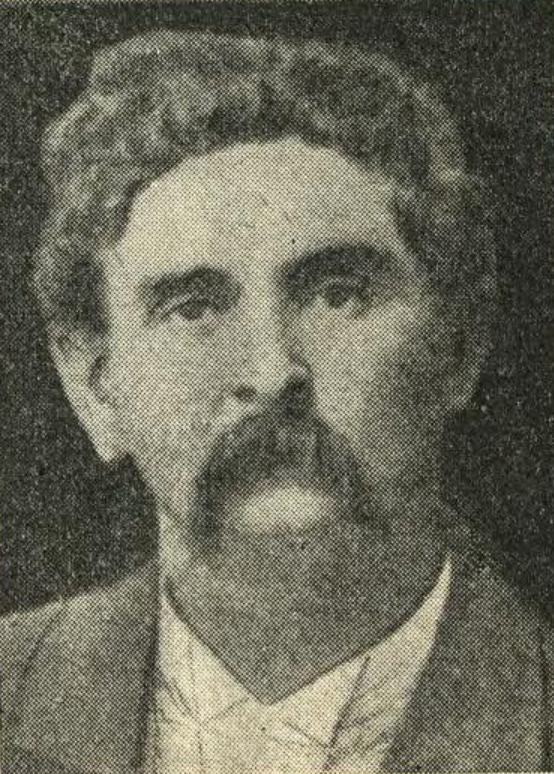
- Born: 18 December 1851; Buenos Aires, Argentina
- Died: 8 January 1904 (aged 52); Sydney, New South Wales, Australia
- Occupations: poet and editor
- Writing career
- Language: English
- Years active: 1878–1904

John Farrell (18 December 1851 – 8 January 1904) was an Australian poet and journalist.

== Early life ==
Farrell was born in Buenos Aires, Argentina, third son of Andrew Farrell, a chemist, and his wife Mary née Parley. His parents left Dublin, Ireland in 1847 and settled in Buenos Aires, end eventually moved to Victoria (Australia).

Farrell spent some time in Darwin, Northern Territory, gold-digging and then travelled around Australia for some time, working as a brewer again, spending time as a farmer or brewer for several years.

== Literary career ==
In 1878 Farrell published, using the name John O'Farrell, Ephemera: An Iliad of Albury, a small pamphlet of verse, and a rare Australian publication. Two Stories, a Fragmentary Poem was published in Melbourne in 1882.

== Late life and legacy ==
Farrell continued to be a regular contributor to the Telegraph until 1903 due to Bright's disease on 8 January 1904. Farrell had married in November 1876 Elizabeth Watts, who survived him with four sons and three daughters. In 1904 a memorial edition of Farrell's poems was published with a memoir by the critic Bertram Stevens under the title of My Sundowner and other Poems. It was re-issued in 1905 as How He Died and other Poems. The contents differ substantially from the 1887 volume of the same name. Farrell's gravestone is inscribed with:

Sleep Heart of Gold! 'Twas not in vain
You loved the struggling and the poor,
And taught, in sweet and strenuous strain
To battle and endure.
The lust of wealth, the pride of place,
Were not a light to guide thy feet,
But larger hopes and wider space
For hearts to beat.

== Bibliography ==
- Two Stories : A Fragmentary Poem (1882)
- How He Died and Other Poems (1887)
- My Sundowner and Other Poems (1904)
- An Iliad of Albury and Other Poems (2002)

== Biography ==
- Stenhouse, Paul, John Farrell: Poet, journalist and social reformer, 1851-1904, North Melbourne: Australian Scholarly Publishing, ISBN 9781925801279;
