= Campion College =

Roman Catholic college in Sydney, Australia

Campion College Australia
- Motto: Educare ad Aeternitatem
- Motto in English: Educating for Eternity
- Type: Liberal arts college
- Established: 2006; 20 years ago
- Religious affiliation: Roman Catholic Church in Australia
- Chairman: Rev Deacon Adam Walk
- President: Dr Paul Morrissey
- Dean: Dr Stephen McInerney
- Students: ~180
- Undergraduates: ~110
- Postgraduates: ~70
- Location: Austin Woodbury Place, Toongabbie, Western Sydney, New South Wales, Australia; 33°47′4″S 150°57′54″E
- Campus: Suburban: 4.0 hectares (10 acres)
- Patron: Saint Edmund Campion
- Newsletter: Campion's Brag
- Colours: Maroon and gold
- Website: campion.edu.au
- Location in greater metropolitan Sydney Campion College (Australia)

Campion College Australia is a Roman Catholic tertiary educational liberal arts college located at Austin Woodbury Place, Toongabbie in the western suburbs of Sydney. Named in honour of Saint Edmund Campion, Campion College offers undergraduate studies in the liberal arts and postgraduate studies in Religious Education. The college welcomed its first intake of students in February 2006.

== Courses ==
All undergraduate students at Campion College study a single, integrated degree – a Bachelor of Arts in the Liberal Arts – which focuses on the development of Western culture. The course brings together four key disciplines – history, literature, philosophy and theology – with the option to study additional units in Latin and Greek. The program is structured (loosely) chronologically: with students studying the ancient world in first year, the Middle Ages and Enlightenment in second and finishing with modernity and postmodernity in the third and final year.

Students may undertake a fourth year of study as part of the Honours program. Those who wish to exit the undergraduate program after the first year of study are eligible to graduate with a Diploma of Liberal Arts – Foundations of the Western Tradition. Students who complete eight languages units concurrently with their Bachelor units are eligible to graduate with an additional Diploma of Classical Languages.

In 2020, Campion launched its first postgraduate course, a Graduate Certificate in Religious Education (Primary). The course serves as professional development for individuals currently teaching Religious Education in primary schools. The Graduate Certificate in Religious Education (Secondary) for individuals teaching Religious Education in secondary schools was introduced in 2025.

Campion College is classed as a Non-Self-Accrediting Institution. Its registration as an institution, and accreditation of courses, are completed through the Tertiary Education Quality and Standards Agency (TEQSA). Accreditation is completed in accordance with the Australian Qualifications Framework. Approval was granted by NSW Department of Education & Training in April 2006 to enrol international students in the Bachelor of Arts. The college is also approved by the Australian Government as a Higher Education provider and as such, eligible students have access to FEE-HELP loans for tuition fees. In 2011, the college had an external quality audit by the Australian Universities Quality Agency (AUQA), with commendations received in relation to the academic and quality culture that have been established.

== History ==
The college's origins lie in a lay movement from the early 1970s – the Fellowship of John XXIII (later the Campion Fellowship) – which sought to renew Catholic intellectual and educational life in Australia, and this in turn led to the founding of Campion College (opened in 2006) as an independent institution offering a classical liberal-arts programme grounded in Catholic faith and the Western intellectual tradition.

Campion College publishes a quarterly newsletter, Campion's Brag. The Campion College Student Association (CCSA) publishes a quarterly magazine called The Sextant.

In 2011, the college established the Centre for the Study of Western Tradition to encourage critical reflection and research on the history, literature, languages, philosophy and theology that characterise Western civilisation and culture, to raise the profile of these vital disciplines in Australian tertiary education. The Centre holds conferences and symposia relating to its central research themes.

== Campus ==
The college's 4-hectare (10-acre) campus and grounds had been a Marist Fathers seminary which was dedicated to, and at one time held relics of, Saint Peter Chanel. The campus houses a chapel, library, accommodation, lecture and tutorial rooms, kitchens, and student areas. In 2018, the college constructed two new residential houses on-site, providing accommodation for an additional 34 students. In 2020, the college received funding and approval to construct a new academic centre on campus, including a new library, lecture theatres, tutorial rooms and dining hall.

Over the years, Campion College has named several of its buildings in honour of donors, supporters, and figures associated with Catholic education. Two new residential buildings were opened in August 2018, with one named after Queensland Jesuit Fr Greg Jordan SJ. In August 2023, the college opened four additional residential halls and a new academic wing that includes classrooms, a lecture theatre, a grand hall, the Parousia Media Room, and the Gina Rinehart Library. Two of the residential halls have been named in honour of Fr Paul Stenhouse MSC and the charitable legacy of Sue Ryder and Leonard Cheshire. In March 2025, the college named the George Cardinal Pell Grand Hall, supported by a donation from an anonymous benefactor. Other rooms on campus have been named in honour of G.K Chesterton, Christopher Dawson, the Right Reverend James Edward Bromley, Reverend Dr Leo W. Kelly, Maria Fernanda de Carvahlo, Fr Julian Tenison-Woods, James and Peggy Power, and the Perez de la Sala family.

== Controversies ==
In 2025 two professors of the college, Dr Stephen McInerney and Dr Stephen Chavura, came under scrutiny following involvement in the March for Australia rally. McInerney has also argued that the White Australia policy did not go far enough and that white Australians may need to live separately from other Australians. Chavura has established a club to celebrate Anglo-celtic culture whose members seek to protect "pro Australia" rallies. In response, the college rejected the premise and conclusions of the media reports, describing them as misleading, while reiterating its commitment to academic freedom and respectful debate. President Paul Morrissey stated that the comments attributed to the two academics had been made in a personal capacity and that there was no evidence of misconduct or unfair treatment of students. The college affirmed its values of free inquiry and the dignity of every person, emphasising that genuine freedom of speech must include the expression of unpopular or controversial views.

In November 2025, The Guardian reported that the Tertiary Education Quality and Standards Agency had launched a compliance process with Campion College into the remarks made by Chavura and McInerney.

== See also ==
- Catholic education in Australia
- Tertiary education in Australia
