= Church of Christ the King, Tennant Creek =

Church in Northern Territory, Australia

Coordinates: 19°38′45″S 134°11′17″E

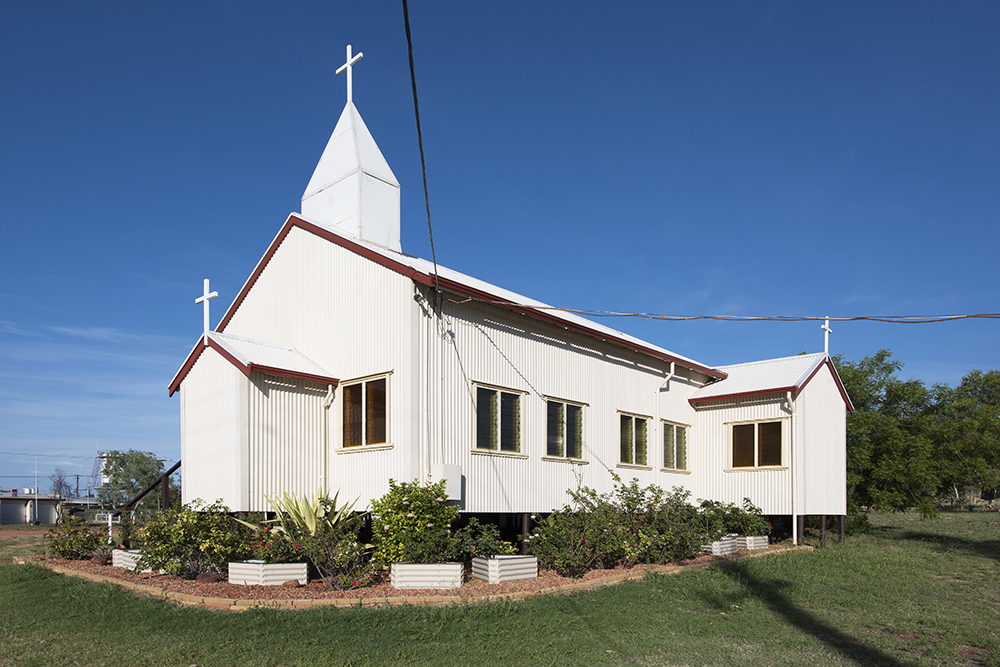
Tennant Creek Catholic Church

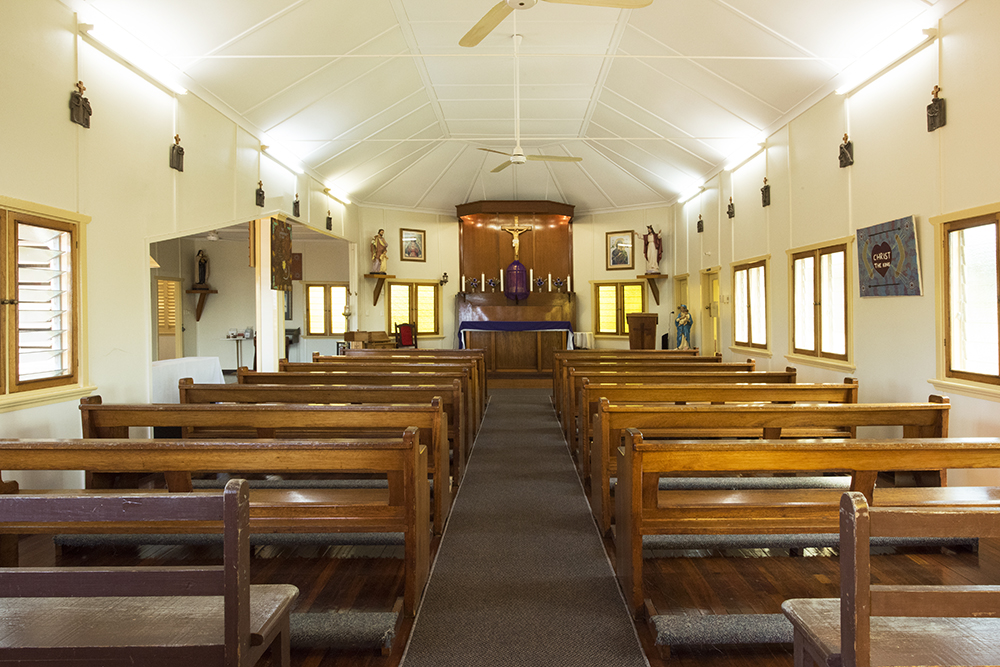
Interior of the Tennant Creek Catholic Church

The Church of Christ the King is located in Tennant Creek in the Northern Territory of Australia. The church was relocated from the historic mining town of Pine Creek. With parts of the church spread between the two towns during the move, it was once known as the "longest church in Australia".

== History ==
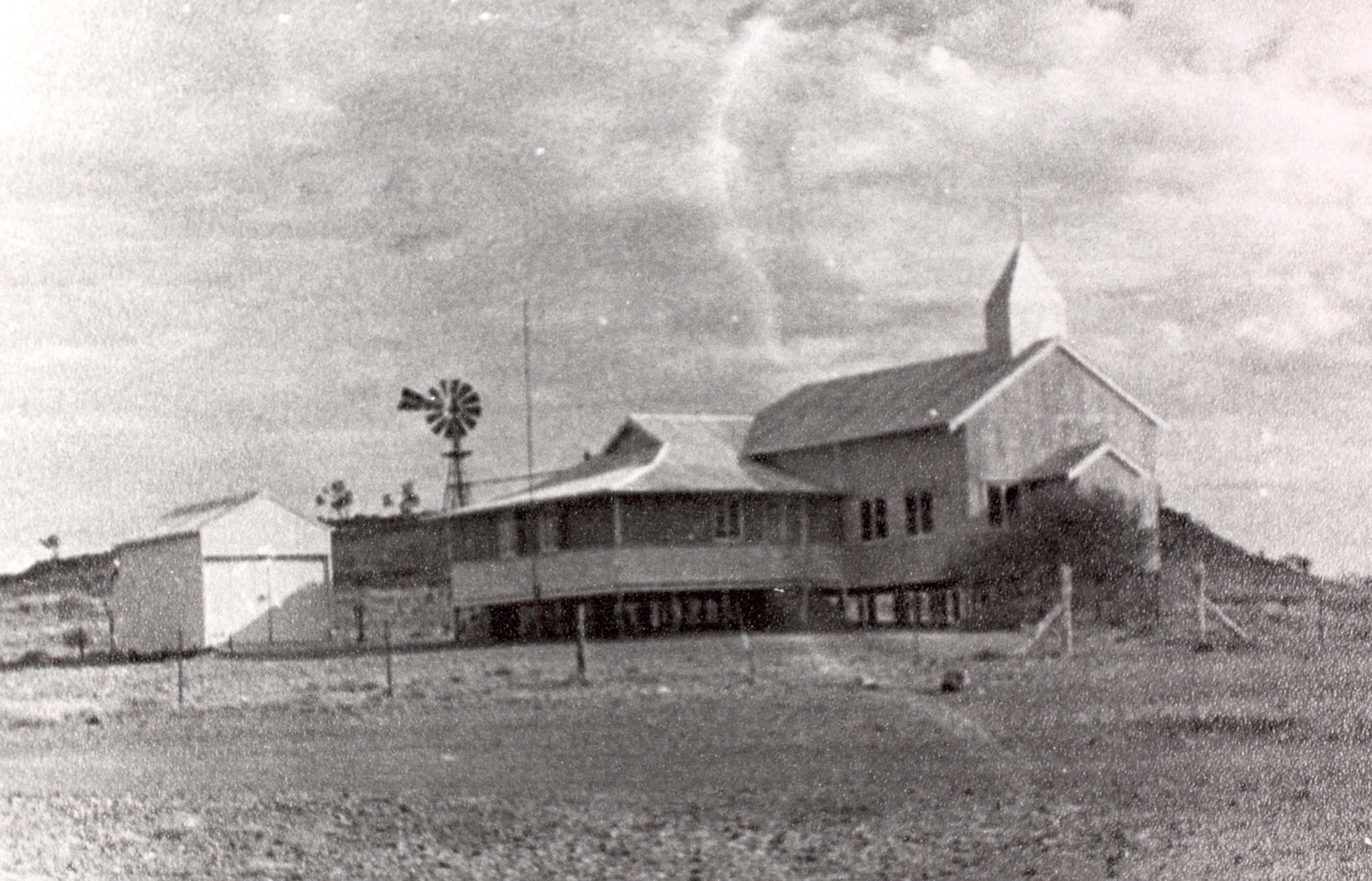
Tennant Creek Catholic Church, date unknown

During the 1930s Tennant Creek was in the midst of a gold mining boom. In 1934, to cater to the growing non-Aboriginal population, approval was granted for the establishment of a Catholic Mission Station in the Tennant Creek area.

The church building was originally constructed in 1904 in Pine Creek, (Note: There are discrepancies between sources about the initial construction date of the church in Pine Creek. Secondary sources outlined in the Background Historical Information document listed as part of the church's heritage application suggest alternative construction dates of 1906 and 1911.) which is 760 km north of Tennant Creek, but by the mid-1930s the church had fallen into disrepair. In 1935 Reverend Father W.J. Dew, M.S.C. of the Darwin Parish, was asked by Bishop Francis Xavier Gsell to assess the needs of the Tennant Creek parishioners, who numbered approximately 300. Dew later wrote:

I was appointed to Tennant Creek in 1935. I went to Darwin in 1936 and discussed the whole situation with Monsignor Gsell. He suggested me taking the P.C. (Pine Creek) church to T.C. (Tennant Creek). So there and then I arranged for Brother Andrew Smith M.S.C. (skipper of our Mission Boat serving Bathurst Island and Port Keats) to come with me to Pine Creek for a fortnight and managed in that time to dismantle the Church that was there.

Father Dew undertook fundraising for the project in Adelaide and was reportedly frustrated by the lack of generosity he encountered there, particularly on one occasion when a wealthy woman replied to his request for a donation by simply saying, "Give my love to the miners".

The dismantled church was railed to Birdum and then trucked the remaining distance. The trucks carrying the dismantled church were caught in floods at Daly Waters and parts of the loads were left on the roadside. Spread out along the route for some time, it became known as the "longest church in Australia". While the church was reconstructed, mass was held "in the residence of some local Catholic". The relocation was expensive, and by the time it was opened on 21 November 1937 by Bishop Raible (Note: Many sources claim the church opened in October 1936. This is incorrect. The Background Historical Information listed as part of the church's heritage application indicates that diaries kept by men of the AIM Club for the period in question confirm that the opening occurred in 1937. Furthermore Father Dew only left Darwin at the end of September 1937.) had cost "many hundreds of pounds". The church was reconstructed in a different layout that in its original location. An office and verandahs were later built "on two sides to serve as accommodation for the priest".

During World War II the church became a social centre for troops travelling the north-south road. Father Dew stayed in Tennant Creek throughout the war and was Chaplain to the 55 Australian Camp Hospital in 1944.

Prior to the official proclamation of the town in 1954 it was mandatory for all those who wished to hold land in Tennant Creek to hold a miner's right. This posed difficulties for the church, but it managed to obtained a miner's right in June 1941.

A Sidney Williams hut adjacent to the church was erected sometime after August 1948 as a hall. A wind-driven generator was used to light up the cross at night in 1953 during the tenure of Father Dallas Cox.

== Recent history ==
The longest-serving priest was Father Taylor who held the post from 1957 to 1970. The church played a role in assisting evacuees from Darwin after Cyclone Tracy. In 1978 the Sidney Williams hut was occupied by the Society of Saint Vincent de Paul until it moved to new premises in Thompson Street in 1979.

In 1980, the church was listed on the now-defunct Register of the National Estate.

The church's fame grew in 1985 when the Blessed Teresa of Calcutta, now Saint Teresa of Calcutta, paid a visit on her Australian tour. She attended a Virgil Mass at the church on Saturday 16 February. A shrine to the saint remains in the church.

The church and the adjacent Sidney Williams hut were listed on the Northern Territory Heritage Register in August 2007. Father John Kennedy is the current priest.
