= James Carlton (athlete) =

Australian sprinter (1909–1951)

Jim Carlton
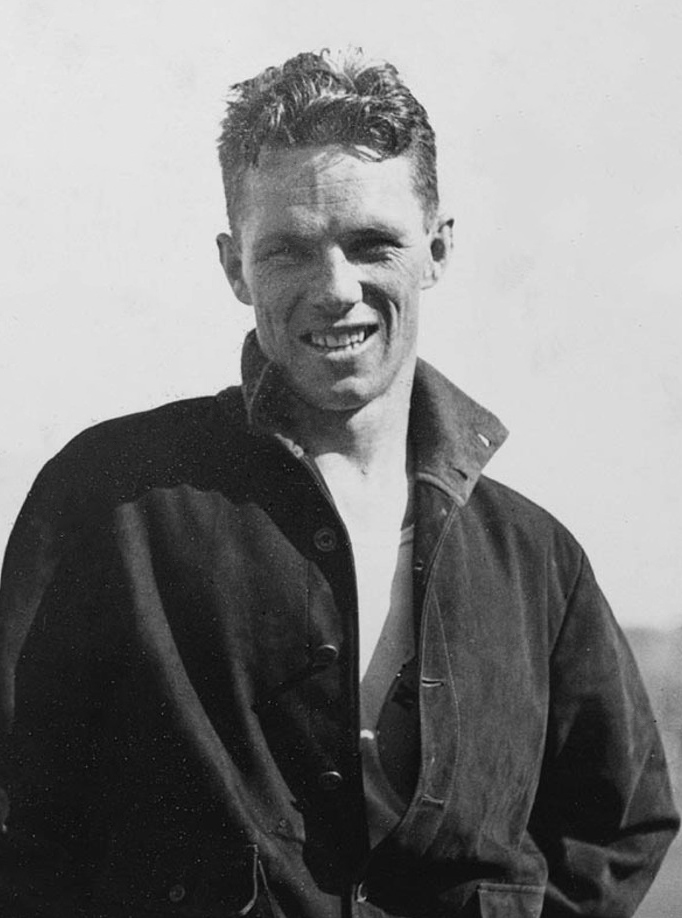
- Carlton in 1932

Personal information
- Full name: James Andrew Carlton
- National team: Australia
- Born: 10 February 1909 Lismore, New South Wales, Australia
- Died: 4 April 1951 (aged 42) Waitara, New South Wales, Australia
- Spouse: Enid Alison Symington

Sport
- Country: Australia
- Sport: Sprint
- Club: Botany Harriers, Sydney

Achievements and titles
- Olympic finals: 1928
- National finals: national 100 m and 200 m titles (1931–33)
- Personal bests: 100 yd – 9.6 (1930); 200 m – 20.5 (1932); 400 m – 48.3 (1931)
- Updated on 22 January 2016

James Andrew Carlton (10 February 1909 – 4 April 1951) was an Australian sprinter. He competed in 100yd and 220yd events at the 1928 Summer Olympics, and was eliminated in quarter finals.

== Schoolboy star ==
Carlton was born in South Lismore and was educated at Marist Brothers schools in Lismore, Darlinghurst Sydney and then at St Joseph's College, Hunters Hill where he was a schoolboy and GPS sprint champion. In both years 1925 and 1926 he won the New South Wales Amateur Athletic Association 120 handicap yd handicap event, the Catholic schools championship and the New South Wales junior title.

In his three senior years at the St Joseph's College from 1925 to 1927, he set GPS records in the 440yds (three successive records and three victories); the 220yds (two successive records and three victories) and the 100yds (one record and three victories). Carlton first came to the sporting public's notice as a schoolboy in 1927 running the 100 yds in 10.0 s and the 220 yds in 21.8 s both those records stood for twenty-nine years. In March 1927 just turned eighteen, he won the New South Wales senior state titles for 100 and 220 yds.

== Senior athletic career ==
At the end of 1927 and just out of school, Carlton ran as the New South Wales representative at an Australasian Games in Wellington and won the 100yd and 200yds events. He joined the Botany Harriers Athletics Club in Sydney and then won three successive national championship sprint doubles (100 yds and 200 yds) in 1928, 1930 and 1932 when the championships were only held every two years. He competed at the 1928 Olympics in Amsterdam but was run out in the quarter-finals, his form affected by illness (quinsy). Though selected for the 1930 British Empire Games, Carlton did not run.

In 1931 Carlton equalled Eddie Tolan's world record for 100 yards of 9.4s but the record was disallowed as the time had only been taken on two stop watches. His 9.6 national record, set in 1930, stood for twenty-three years.

His 20.6s run to win the 220 yards national championship at the Sydney Cricket Ground in 1932 created a sensation, smashing the world record (then 21.0s), and was controversially judged as wind assisted. The judge reportedly used a piece of wood to ascertain the wind speed and his decision was disputed by observers present at the time. The Carlton's time was surpassed only after the Second World War.

== Priesthood ==
In 1932 Carlton retired from athletics and entered the Missionaries of the Sacred Heart seminary in order to become a priest; a move that meant he could not compete at the 1932 Olympics.

== Marriage ==
Carlton left the Sacred Heart Monastery and the priesthood in 1945. He married Enid Alison Symington, of Chatswood, a stenographer, at Chatswood on 10 April 1945. They had two children: Mike (born 1946), the well-known Sydney radio broadcaster, and Peter (born 1950), who became a human resource manager.

== Later life ==
Carlton then worked as a school teacher at Barker College and in 1948 was appointed as a selector and coach for the New South Wales Amateur Athletic Association. In parallel he wrote sports articles for the Sydney Morning Herald.

== Death ==
Carlton died of asthma on 4 April 1951, aged 42, at his home in Waitara, Sydney.
