= Frank Flynn =

Australian ophthalmologist and Catholic priest (1906 – 2000)

The Reverend Frank Flynn AC FRACO

Personal details
- Born: Francis Stanislaus Flynn; 6 December 1906 Sydney, New South Wales, Australia
- Died: 29 July 2000 (aged 93)

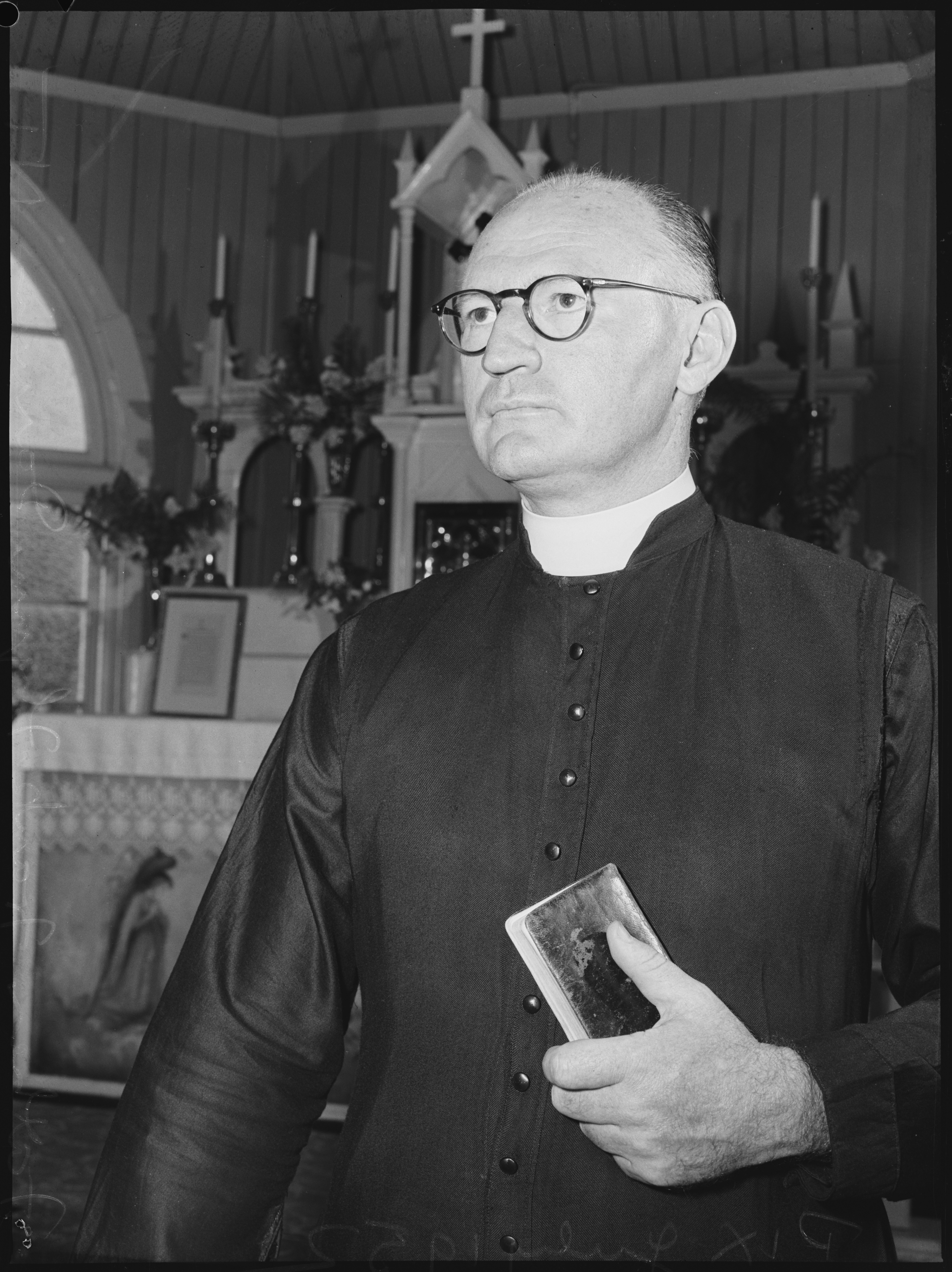
Father Frank Flynn, Darwin. N.T., July 1952

Francis Stanislaus Flynn (6 December 1906, Sydney – 29 July 2000) was a Northern Territory-based Australian medical doctor (ophthalmologist), author and missionary priest. He is notable for his contributions to religion, medicine and Aboriginal welfare.

He was born on 6 December 1906 and educated in Sydney, receiving MB BS with 1st class honours in 1930. In 1931 he sailed to England and in 1931 and 1933–1934 studied and worked at the Royal Ophthalmic Hospital (Moorfields) in London. Prior to World War II he had made several important contributions to the study of eye disease, including the introduction of a new drug which he named Mydriciane, and the design and patenting of a machine used in operating on detached retinas.

He returned to Sydney in 1934 and joined the Missionaries of the Sacred Heart (Missionnaires du Sacré-Coeur) (MSC) in December 1935. He was ordained a priest in March 1942 and, with advice from the pioneering missionary Bishop Gsell, was sent to the Northern Territory. From 1942 to 1945 worked with Army Hospitals. From 1946 to 1968 he was consulting ophthalmologist to the Northern Territory Department of Health. His activity as a consulting ophthalmologist to the Northern Territory Trachoma and Eye Health Programme continued until 1992.

From 1944 to 1946 he studied anthropology with Professor Elkin and gained Diploma of Anthropology at University of Sydney with the intention of gaining "a wider knowledge and appreciation of Aboriginal culture and genealogy, and academic methods of field research".

As early as 1942 maybe he had identified and officially reported that there was an appallingly high level of trachoma amongst the Australian Aboriginal people in the Northern Territory. In 1957 he made a full report on his findings in The Medical Journal of Australia. In 1976 an official Australian-wide survey on trachoma amongst Australian Aboriginals was started under the direction of Professor Fred Hollows, who was mentored by Flynn.

In 1967 Flynn was transferred to Port Moresby as Administrator of the Cathedral and Director of Catholic Health Services in Papua New Guinea. In 1970 the Medical Faculty at the University of Papua New Guinea was founded.

He returned to Darwin in 1977 and was still active in the 1990s; for example, in 1995 he worked with Army medical eye service units which travelled to isolated Aboriginal communities in the Northern Territory.

== Recognition ==
At one stage his full list of titles read: MSC, AC, MB, BS (Syd), DOMS RCP&S (Eng), Dip Relig Studies (Rome), Dip Anthrop (Syd), FACTM (Townsville), MD (hc) (Syd), DSc (hc) (NTC), which led to a young friend writing, "Mum is worried about the number of letters after your name".

- 1969 - appointed a Foundation Fellow of the Australian College of Ophthalmologists.
- 1979 - appointed Officer of the Order of Australia (AO).
- 1981 - awarded Doctorate of Medicine Honoris Causa University of Sydney.
- 1985 - elected Foundation Member International Society of Dakryology.
- 1990 - conferred with the Papal Apostolic Diploma, together with the Cross Pro Ecclesia et Pontifice.
- 1993 - appointed Companion of the Order of Australia (AC).
- 1993 - awarded Honorary Doctor of Science, NTC
- 1994 - appointed Fellow of the Australasian College of Tropical Medicine.
- 1996 - appointed an Honorary Life Member of the Royal Australian and New Zealand College of Ophthalmologists.

== Publications ==
- 1947 Distant Horizons
- 1963 Northern Gateway
- 1964 The Living Heart (with Keith Willey)
- 1968 Northern Frontiers (with Keith Willey)
