= Paul Stenhouse =

Australian Catholic priest and editor (1935–2019)

- Born: Paul Francis Lester Stenhouse; 9 December 1935; Casino, New South Wales, Australia
- Died: 19 November 2019 (aged 83); Sydney, Australia

Paul Francis Lester Stenhouse OAM (9 December 1935 – 19 November 2019) was an Australian Catholic priest and editor. A member of the Missionaries of the Sacred Heart, he was a scholar, linguist, expert on Samaritan studies, writer, historian, and editor of the longest lasting journal in Australia's history, Annals Australasia: Journal of Catholic Culture.

== Early life and education ==
Paul Francis Lester Stenhouse was born on 9 December 1935, in Casino, northern New South Wales. His father, Richard, was born in New Zealand but later moved to Australia. He married Paul’s mother, May Kathleen Huntley Skinner in 1933 in Camden, NSW. Soon afterwards, the Stenhouses moved to Casino. Paul's father had obtained work as a journalist in Casino but was forced to change his line of work to do painting. Paul was born during this time. Not long afterwards his father died from complications of pneumonia. So Paul and Richard (Paul's elder brother) and May Stenhouse moved back to Camden, to the area near where she had grown up.

His early schooling was at home because of poor health. Later he attended St Paul’s Convent School in Camden, run by the Sisters of St Joseph. He left school after only a few years in high school and took a job as a journalist with the Camden Times and other local newspapers.

In 1953 he entered the minor seminary of the Missionaries of the Sacred Heart at Douglas Park and he then completed his Novitiate for the priesthood there. He took vows on 26 February 1957, and then went to the MSC Seminary in Croydon in Melbourne. He was ordained a priest on 20 July 1963.

== Editing career ==
After his ordination, Fr Stenhouse was appointed Business Manager of the Catholic journal popularly known as the Annals which was produced at the Sacred Heart Monastery. He was then appointed editor, and apart from some breaks, was editor of the Annals for 51 years. After his graduation and a period in Rome, Fr Stenhouse resumed editorship of Annals in 1981. His scholarship and journalistic flair boosted its circulation. Apart from investigative reports from various parts of the world where the church was persecuted, he formed a team of writers who wrote on subjects as varied as history, computing, literature, theology, philosophy, psychology, politics, science and art history. Its circulation rivalled that of the Bulletin at times. The Annals achieved the distinction of being the longest lasting journal in Australian history.

== Samaritan studies ==
Fr Stenhouse began a Bachelor of Arts course at the University of Sydney, majoring in Modern Hebrew and Arabic and graduating with Honours in 1972. While enmeshed in his studies of Hebrew and Arabic Fr Stenhouse had become fascinated by the Samaritans. He was influenced in this by Professor Alan Crown, who taught in the Semitic Studies Department at Sydney University, who became a lifelong friend. His Honours thesis was entitled: "A Critical Edition of the historical sections of the Samaritan Hebrew Hilukh" and Fr Stenhouse's interest in the Samaritans was extended into a doctoral thesis. He became proficient at many languages including Arabic, Hebrew, Aramaic, Syriac, Greek, Latin, German, Italian, French and Croatian.

In 1980, he returned to Australia with the doctorate finally completed and waited for it to be assessed and when it was, he obtained his PhD from the University of Sydney, graduating in 1982. His thesis was a critical edition of the middle Arabic Samaritan text, the Kitab al Tarikh of Abu'l-Fath.

== Pastoral work ==
From the beginning of his priesthood, Father Stenhouse reached out to a wide network of friends in many communities. He was especially helpful to many Asian students studying in Australia, helping them with practical needs and being a mentor to them.

He worked on the Board for Aid to the Church in Need (ACN) with Phillip Collignon who was its director for 27 years. Fr Stenhouse and Phillip travelled to Ukraine, East Timor and China, among other places, giving readers of Annals and ACN News eyewitness accounts of how the church was surviving there. He also worked with Karl Schmude in the early phases of setting up Campion College in Sydney (established in 2006). Fr Stenhouse gave regular lectures there and gave his last public lecture there on 19 October 2019 one month before his death. Fr Stenhouse was awarded Doctor of the University (honoris causa) of the Australian Catholic University in 2015, "in recognition of his significant contributions to knowledge and the life of learning in Australia and internationally, to higher education, to journalism and Catholic culture, and to priestly service and pastoral care of the Catholic community."

== Final years ==
Fr Stenhouse suffered from cancer in his final years, though continuing to work while sick. He finally was moved to the Sacred Heart Hospice Sydney several weeks before he died.

Fr Stenhouse died on 19 November 2019. Archbishop Anthony Fisher said at his funeral that with the death of Fr Paul Stenhouse, "a light has been extinguished in our world, even if for him it has merely been a change of address." He was posthumously awarded the Medal of the Order of Australia on 26 January 2021.

== Books by Paul Stenhouse ==
- 1985, The Kitab al-Tarikh of Abu 'l-Fath, Sydney: Mandelbaum, ISBN 0949269751
- 1988, Catholic Answers to "Bible" Christians, Kensington, NSW: Chevalier Press, ISBN 0731695704
- 1992, Annals Almanac of Catholic Curiosities, Kensington, NSW: Chevalier Press, ISBN 0869401041
- 2003, The Conquest of Abyssinia, by Shihab al-Din Ahmad bin 'Abdu 'l Qader bin Salem bin Uthman, Hollywood CA: TSEHAI Publishers, ISBN 9780972317252
- 2008, John Farrell: Poet, Journalist and Social Reformer, 1851-1904, North Melbourne: Australian Scholarly Publishing, ISBN 9781925801279
- 2019, Islam: Context and Complexity, North Melbourne: Australian Scholarly Publishing (Pamphleteer series, Issue 8) ISBN 9781925801897.

== Books about Paul Stenhouse ==
- 2020, Peter Malone, Paul Stenhouse: A Distinctive and Distinguished Missionary of the Sacred Heart, North Melbourne, Australian Scholarly Publishing, ISBN 9781922454034
- 2021, Wanda Skowronska, Paul Stenhouse MSC: A Life of Rare Wisdom, Compassion and Inspiration, ISBN 9781922449443
