= 2SM =

Radio station

- Sydney, New South Wales; Australia
- Frequency: 1269 kHz

Programming
- Format: News talk

Ownership
- Owner: Broadcast Operations Group; (Radio 2SM Pty Ltd)
- Sister stations: Dance Super Digi; Fun Super Digi; Gorilla Radio; Zoo Digital

History
- First air date: 24 December 1931
- Former frequencies: 1270 KHz AM (1931–1978)
- Call sign meaning: St Marys Cathedral

Technical information
- Licensing authority: ACMA
- Power: 5kW
- Transmitter coordinates: 33.8336°S 151.0700°E

Links
- Public licence information: Profile
- Website: 2sm.com.au

2SM is an Australian radio station, licensed to and serving Sydney, broadcasting on 1269 kilohertz on the AM band. It is owned and operated by Broadcast Operations Group. The SM call sign is taken from the initials of Saint Mary's.

2SM's programs are heard across the 2SM Super Radio Network in regional New South Wales, the Northern Territory and Queensland, consisting of over 60 AM and FM stations.

2SM unveiled its denim zipper logo in 1975. Although the logo is inextricably linked to 2SM, it was, according to radio historian Wayne Mac, actually created for Brisbane pop station 4IP by a company called Eagle Marketing and subsequently adopted by other stations including 2SM, 3XY and 2NX.

== History ==
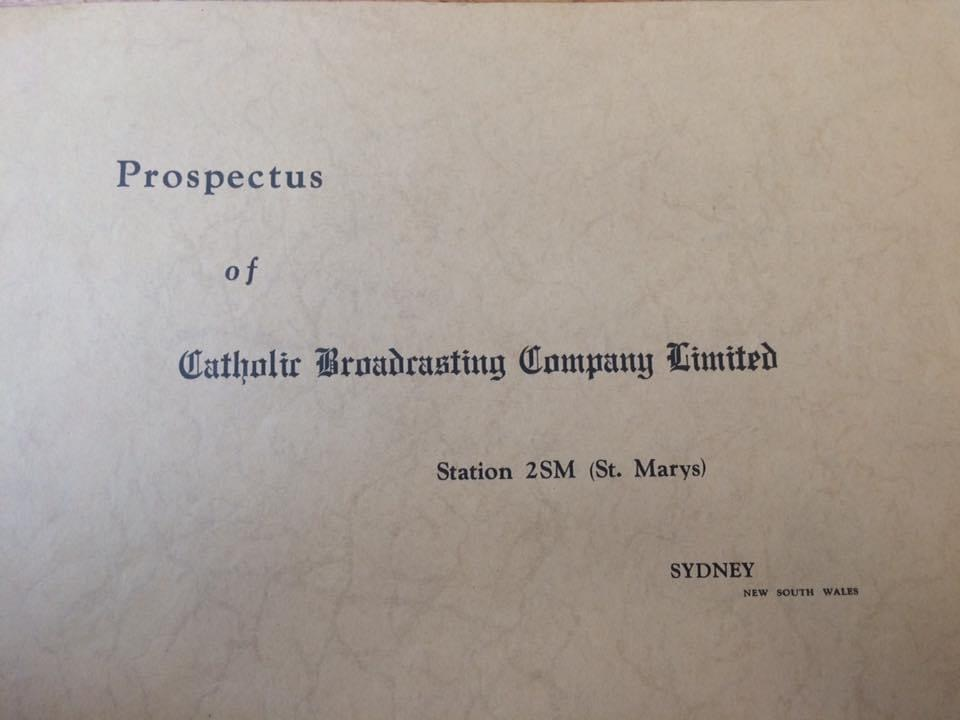

James Meany, a parish priest at St Mark's Drummoyne, raised funds to allow Archbishop Michael Kelly to form the Catholic Broadcasting Co. Ltd, and it obtained a licence for radio 2SM in 1931. The station, owned by the Roman Catholic Church, was opened by Kelly on 24 December 1931. Apart from the regular Question Box program of Dr Rumble, religious content was, for most part, not its focus; but for most of its life 2SM followed a conservative line in its programming, and it was promoted as "The Family Station".

In 1958 2SM moved to premises at 257 Clarence Street, Sydney, maintaining its style. At the time, the station was run by General Manager Bill Stephenson, who started his radio career at 2UE in the 1940s before moving to 2SM in the 1950s. In September 1963 Stephenson oversaw a radical overhaul of 2SM's format. It started 24-hour service, and was relaunched as a Top 40 station. It had Australia's first team of disc jockeys, dubbed "The Good Guys"—a US-radio inspired format subsequently copied by 3AK, 5KA, 6PR and others. It relied heavily on adaptations of formulaic programming strategies sourced from American commercial radio.

Then in early 1967 2SM became the first station in the country to adopt the new "talkback" technology which enabled presenters for the first time to broadcast phone conversations with members of the public. In November 1968 2SM reverted to an all music format. In 1969 2SM aggressively fought to regain the youth audience it had lost to 2UW. During 1970 2SM established itself as one of the most promotionally active and innovative commercial stations. Rod Muir successfully transplanted the American "More Music" format to Sydney, making minor adaptations for the Australian market. With stringent format policies applying to music flow, commercial content, what announcers said and the placement of jingles, 2SM redefined the whole premise of music based radio in Australia. Key to the More Music philosophy was a strictly limited, high rotation play list of around 30 songs and which at peak times reputedly included as few as 15 songs in one three-hour shift. The new format had several significant effects. First and foremost, it brought to an abrupt end the days of the true "personality" DJs, as exemplified by 2UW's Ward "Pally" Austin and 3XY's legendary Stan "The Man" Rofe. The rigid formatting restricted the on-air presentation, replacing it with a highly affected, American-style presented by a largely faceless and interchangeable roster of "rock jocks". But even more significantly, the "More Music" format took programming decisions out of the hands of DJs and put them into the hands of consultants and back room programming executives.

In December 2024, Chris Smith was announced as the replacement for John Laws on the 2SM Mornings Program. Ron Wilson was also announced as the new host of 2SM Breakfast.

In mid-2025, Tim Webster replaced Ron Wilson on 2SM Breakfast. Wilson had been in the slot for 6 months.

In October 2026 after 24 years on air, 2SM Drive Program, Talkin' Sport was axed.

== Rock of the 80s ==
From around 1970 until the mid-1980s, 2SM dominated Sydney commercial radio. At its peak in the late-1970s it was the highest rating and most profitable station in the history of Australian radio. It epitomised and defined commercial AM Top 40 radio practice around the country for fifteen years and long after 2SM itself lost popularity, its successful programming formula was still influencing its FM band successors.

The introduction of new AM station, 2WS in 1978, and FM stations 2Day and Triple M at the start of the 1980s saw 2SM's glory days slowly come to an end. In the early 1980s the station retained reasonable ratings with contemporary music formats and slogans such as "Rock of the 80s", "More Music" and "The Power".

Ian Grace who was the drive announcer in the early 80s, became the Program Director (and eventually went on to become the Group Program Director of the Triple M Network in the 1980s/90s). The on-air line-up at 2SM Rock of the 80s in 1984 included: By this stage its studios were at 186 Blues Point Road, McMahons Point.

Time	Show name
6:00 am – 9:00 am	Phil Lentz
9.00 am - 12.00 pm	Dan Craig
12.00 pm - 3,00 pm	Frank Fursey
3:00 pm – 7:00 pm	Ian Grace
7.00 pm - 10.00 pm	Charlie Fox

From 1980 until 1984, 2SM owned a 34% shareholding in Brisbane television station TVQ.

In 1988 the station dropped its Top 40 format as well as the 2SM brand when it became "Lite & Easy 1269". Its final rating as a Top 40 station had been 6.9%. The years since have seen its format undergo numerous changes, including easy listening and country formats (KICK AM). The ratings never again surpassed 4%.

== The 1990s ==
In the 1990s, the station regained its original callsign (2SM) and recorded some of the lowest ratings ever by a Sydney commercial radio station. In February 1992 a commercial syndicate headed by John Brown attempted to purchase the station. In July the station was finally sold to Wesgo, who sacked the entire on-air staff and put the station into automation. Wesgo relaunched the station with a country music format in October. With the station still last place in the ratings, it went back to easy listening in May 1994, adopting the new name Gold 1269 and by Survey 8 1994 hit the heights of 7.1%. In late 1994 Wesgo was purchased by Australian Provincial Newspapers, who later purchased the Australian Radio Network in March 1995, requiring some stations to be sold due to media ownership rules. The station was sold to Kick Media, headed by former INXS manager, Chris Murphy. It was rebranded Kick AM in mid-October with a format comprising country, rock and blues. RG Capital bought a 40% stake in February 1996. By the end of 1996 the station still had low ratings, causing the owners to relaunch it on Christmas Eve 1996 as The New 2SM, with a format of hits from the 60s to 80s.

In 2002 the night time show, hosted by Graeme Gilbert, scored a rating of just 0.1%, the lowest rating ever recorded for a commercial program in a metro market in Australia. 2SM subsequently withdrew from the Sydney radio ratings.

== Current Station Lineup ==
5:00AM - 9:00AM: The Tim Webster Breakfast Show

9:00AM - 12:00PM: Chris Smith Across Australia

12:00PM - 3:00PM: Brent Bultitude

3:00PM - 6:00PM: David Wright

6:00PM - 8:00PM: Sportsday

8:00PM - 12:00AM: The Nightline with Cheralyn Darcey

12:00AM - 5:00AM: Gary Stewart
