= Leslie Rumble =

Australian Catholic priest and religious controversialist

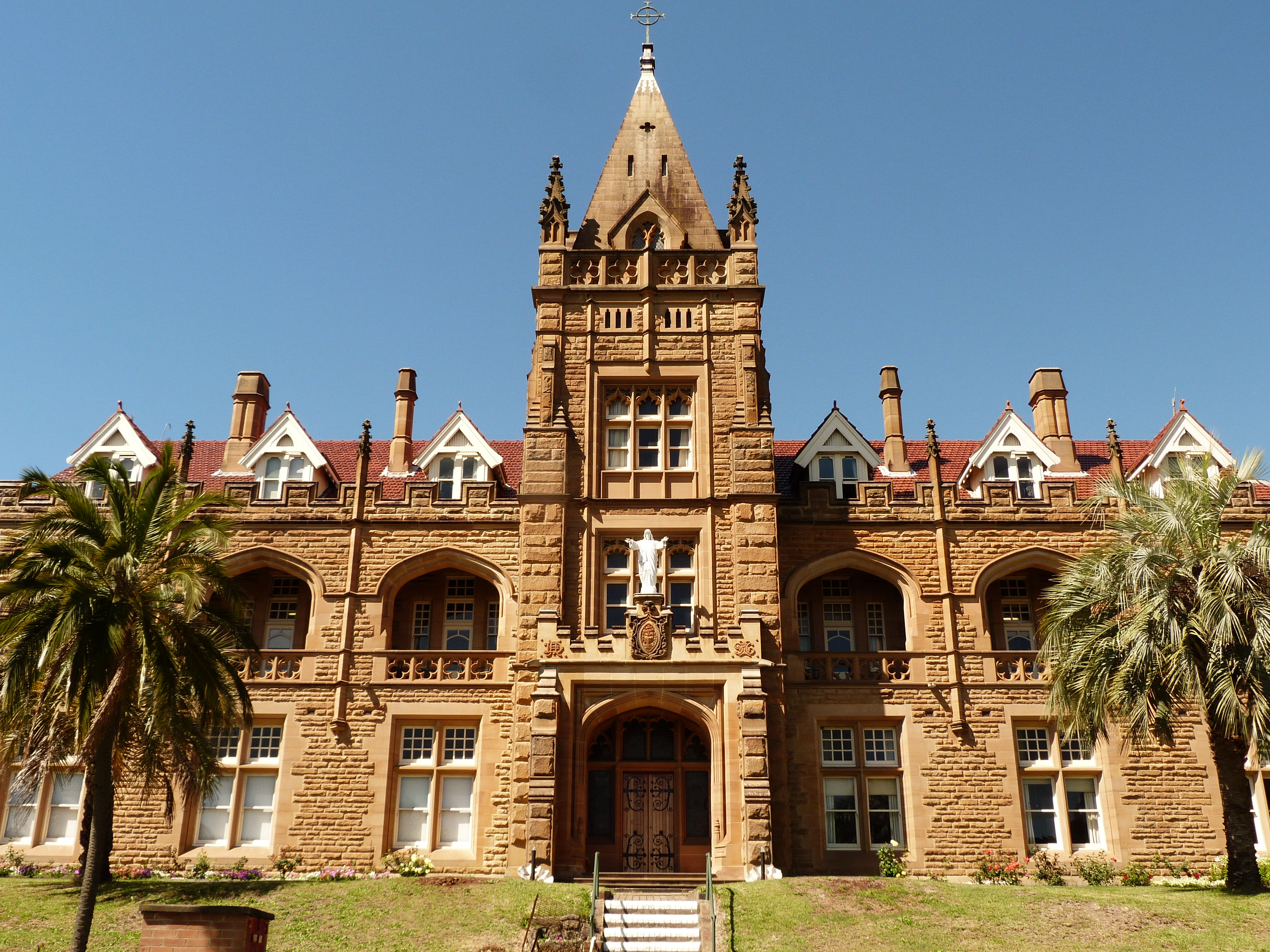
Sacred Heart Monastery, Kensington, New South Wales, where Dr Rumble taught theology

Leslie Audoen Rumble, MSC (1892–1975), usually known as "Dr Rumble", an Australian Catholic priest and religious controversialist, was born in Enmore, New South Wales in 1892. His family was mostly Anglican but he converted to Catholicism. He was ordained as a priest in the order of the Missionaries of the Sacred Heart in 1924. After gaining a doctorate at the Angelicum University in Rome studying with such teachers as Reginald Garrigou-Lagrange, he returned to Australia in 1927 and for many years taught theology at the order's seminary in Kensington, New South Wales. He worked closely with his colleague, philosophy lecturer Dr P. J. Ryan.

== Work in radio and print ==
In 1928 Dr Rumble began a Sunday evening programme on radio-station 2UE, answering queries about Catholicism. Dr Rumble's 'Question Box' was transferred to the Catholic station 2SM and continued until 1968. It became "the most famous religious program on Australian radio." It answered questions sent in by listeners, often hostile ones from Protestants. He treated inquirers as honest seekers for the truth and answered in a very logical style "in a voice like worn sandpaper". He criticised the "puritan element" as well as the "Godless secularism" of Australian society.

Written versions of his Question Box program were popular in the United States (where he toured successfully in 1940-41) as well as Australia and were said to have sold seven million copies.

During the federal election campaign of 1949 Rumble suggested that the Labor Party was too committed to socialisation for Catholics to vote for. Rumble's views were attacked by Arthur Calwell and Archbishop Mannix.

Rumble was unhappy about many of the changes in the Church following the Second Vatican Council. He died in 1975.

== Bibliography ==
- Rumble, Leslie (1929). Cobblestones and Catholicity. Sydney: Pellegrini.
- Rumble, Leslie (2001). Radio Replies: Vol 1. Charlotte NC: TAN books. ISBN 9781505102598.
- Rumble, Leslie (1953). Reply to the Anglican Bishops of Australia. Kensington NSW: Annals Office.
- Rumble, Leslie (1975). Questions People Ask About the Catholic Church. Kensington NSW: Chevalier Press.
- Littleton, Jim (2011). Defender of the Catholic Faith: Dr Leslie Rumble MSC. ISBN 9780980858839.
