= Francis Xavier Gsell =

Roman Catholic bishop

Francis Xavier Gsell MSC
- Bishop of Darwin
- Church: Catholic Church
- Diocese: Diocese of Darwin
- In office: 29 March 1938 – 10 November 1948
- Predecessor: Rosendo Salvado
- Successor: John Patrick O'Loughlin
- Other post: Titular Bishop of Paros (1948-1960)
- Previous post: Apostolic Administrator of Victoria–Palmerston (1906-1938)

Orders
- Ordination: 30 May 1896
- Consecration: 5 June 1938 by Giovanni Panico

Personal details
- Born: 30 June 1872 Benfeld, Imperial Territory of Alsace–Lorraine, German Empire
- Died: 12 July 1960 (aged 88) Sydney, New South Wales, Australia, British Empire

Francis Xavier Gsell, OBE (30 June 1872 – 12 July 1960) was a German-born Australian Roman Catholic bishop and missionary, known as the "Bishop with 150 wives" for his work freeing girls from arranged marriages.

== Early life ==
He was born at Benfeld, Alsace in 1872, the son of Laurent Gsell, spinner, and his wife Josephine. He grew up in Sainte-Croix-aux-Mines, where he sought to follow in his father's footsteps and began to apprentice as a cotton-spinner.

At 15, he moved to Issoudun where he studied for six years at Le Petit-Oeuvre, an Apostolic school run by the Missionaries of the Sacred Heart to educate and inspire a priestly vocation in young men from poorer backgrounds who otherwise couldn't afford it. He entered the Society and took vows in 1892. He was sent to Pontifical Roman Athenaeum Saint Apollinare to study theology and philosophy, where his colleagues included Eugene Pacelli, the future Pope Pius XII.

== Priesthood ==
He was ordained as a priest for the Missionaries of the Sacred Heart on 30 May 1896 in Rome.

He was sent to Sydney in 1897, arriving in Australia in October 1897. He taught in the Order's motherhouse at Kensington.

He began active missionary work in Papua in 1900, then in 1906 re-established the Catholic Church in Palmerston (now Darwin), Northern Territory. He established an Aboriginal mission on Bathurst Island in 1910 and worked there until 1938. The local Tiwi people called him Parrakijiyali. On 23 April 1906, he was appointed Apostolic Administrator of Diocese of Victoria-Palmerston, which had been without a bishop since 1888.

Though unsuccessful in converting adults, he persisted with children's education and "bought" many girls promised in marriage to older men according to tribal custom. He became known as the "Bishop with 150 wives" (also the title of his autobiography) for his activities in freeing girls from such arranged marriages, thus making it possible for them to marry men of their own age. He defended the policy against criticism by Communist leader Tom Wright, and argued that "the natives are a race committing suicide" who "cannot stand the clash with modern civilisation".

Gsell was made an Officer of the Order of the British Empire (OBE) in 1935.

In 1936, Gsell was involved with establishing the Tennant Creek Catholic Church, which was dismantled and moved from its previous location at Pine Creek.

== Episcopate ==
On 29 March 1938, Gsell was appointed Bishop of Darwin by Pope Pius XI. He was consecrated a bishop at Our Lady of the Sacred Heart Church, Randwick by Archbishop Giovanni Panico.

As bishop, he was influential in founding Aboriginal missions at Port Keats and Arltunga. His collaboration with government promoted assimilation policies. As Bishop of Darwin he was in charge of the Catholic Church's share of the policy of child removals of children of mixed parentage now known as the Stolen Generations. He defended the practice, writing "if they had families, and if they were surrounded by that love and affection family life offers to the young even amongst primitive peoples, it might be cruel. But these creatures roam miserably around the camps and their behaviour is often worse than that of native children. It is an act of mercy to remove them as soon as possible from surroundings so insecure."

In 1946, the Commonwealth government sought to resume all freehold land in Darwin, and attempted to remove the Catholic cathedral and school to another site. Gsell fought the move and won.

In 1947, he visited Rome and had a private audience with Pope Pius XII where he detailed the plight of the Aboriginal people and the Church in Darwin. On 10 November 1948, Gsell's retirement was accepted by Pope Pius XII, after almost 50 years serving in the Northern Territory.

He retired to the Sacred Heart Monastery in the Sydney suburb of Kensington. In 1950, was awarded the Legion of Honour. During retirement, he also penned his autobiography The bishop with 150 wives, which was published in French in 1954 and English in 1955. In 1951 Pope Pius XII created him bishop assistant at the pontifical throne. He died in 1960 at the age of 87.

== Book ==
- F.X. Gsell, The Bishop with 150 Wives: Fifty years as a missionary, London, 1955.
