= Missionaries of the Sacred Heart =

Roman Catholic religious congregation

- Abbreviation: MSC
- Formation: 8 December 1854; 171 years ago
- Founder: Jules Chevalier
- Type: Catholic religious congregation
- Location: Rome, Italy
- Superior General: Mario Abzalón Alvarado Tovar

The Missionaries of the Sacred Heart of Jesus (MSC; Latin: Missionarii Sacratissimi Cordis; French: Missionnaires du Sacré-Coeur) are a missionary congregation in the Catholic Church. It was founded in 1854 by Jules Chevalier at Issoudun, France, in the Diocese of Bourges.

The motto of the Missionaries of the Sacred Heart is: May the Sacred Heart of Jesus be loved everywhere! The priests, deacons and brothers of the Missionaries of the Sacred Heart are known as MSCs (from the Latin, Missionarii Sacratissimi Cordis). The international headquarters is in Rome with numerous communities throughout the world.

== History ==
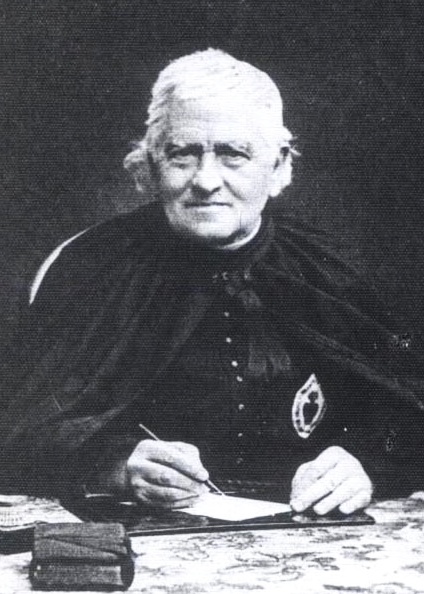
Jules Chevalier

Jules Chevalier founded the Archconfraternity of the Sacred Heart in 1864. In 1867 it opened its first school in Chezal-Benoît in the Centre region of France.

Three missionaries from Barcelona founded the first overseas mission in 1882 near Rabaul on the island of New Britain in Papua, where the order began a mission at Yule Island in 1885.

In 1885, a supply base for the Papua New Guinea mission was founded in Sydney, Australia and the Australian Province was established in 1905. Bishop Gsell and other Australian MSCs such as ophthalmologist Fr Frank Flynn were active in missionary work to Aboriginal Australians. In the mid-twentieth century, the imposing monastery at Kensington, New South Wales was the home of the anti-Communist organiser Dr P.J. ('Paddy') Ryan and the popular Catholic controversialist Dr Leslie Rumble, and published the long-running magazine of Catholic culture Annals Australasia, edited for many decades by Fr Paul Stenhouse MSC.

The Congregation established provinces in the Netherlands (1894), the United States (1939), Spain (1946), Ireland (1952), Indonesia (1971) and the Dominican Republic (1986).
