= Randwick Boys High School =

Location
- Rainbow Street and Avoca Street; Randwick, New South Wales, 2031; Australia; 33°55′30.10″S 151°14′18.51″E

Information
- Type: Public secondary day school
- Mottoes: 'Guiding young men to success' 'Labore et Honor ' (Work and Honour)
- Established: 1882 (public school); 1944 (junior high school); 1949 (high school)
- Closed: 2024
- Principal: Lance Raskall (Former) / Belinda Conway (Transition principal)
- Years offered: 7–12
- Gender: Boys-only
- Enrolment: 855 (7–12)
- Campus: Rainbow and Avoca Streets
- Houses: Vikings; Spartans; Titans; Romans
- Colours: White and bottle green

Randwick Boys High School (RBHS) was a boys high school located in Randwick, Sydney, Australia, between Rainbow Street and Avoca Street. Operated by the New South Wales Department of Education with students from years 7 to 12, the school was established in 1944 as a junior high school, gaining full high school status in 1949. The history of the school can be traced back to 1883 with the establishment of Randwick Public School. In 2025, the school amalgamated with the adjoining Randwick Girls' High School to form 'Randwick High School' as a single co-educational campus.

== History and Campus ==
The history of Randwick Boys dates back to 1883, when Randwick Public School was established by the NSW government. The school, to accommodate 200 students, was built on land at the top of Avoca Street, Randwick, with Mr. E.M. Grant as the first Headmaster.

From that time it grew steadily and frequent building additions were made, transforming the original construction into the present school now occupied by Randwick Primary and Infants School and the Randwick North High School. One of the most notable headmasters during this period was Alfred Godwin Alanson, who was Headmaster from 1907 to 1928. During his tenure, the school's reputation enabled it to be upgraded to Randwick Superior Public School in 1913, providing a commercial secondary course, and then to an "intermediate high school" in 1920.

Alanson's successor from 1929, E. Nettleship, put forward the idea in 1930 that Randwick Intermediate should be made into a full five-year high school. The first version of the school badge was designed in this year. The School motto "Labore et Honore" (Work and Honour) is credited to have been devised by a Latin/English teacher, Harry Kresner, around 1948. The headmaster from 1941, F. Purnell, led the push that resulted in the school being further upgraded to the independent Randwick Boys Junior High School in 1944. This later led to the establishment of a full high school in 1949, thus giving Randwick equal status with all other full high schools in New South Wales. Purnell thus became the first headmaster of Randwick Boys High School.

By the early 1950s there were calls to relocate the school to a new site recently obtained by the Department of Education, on the corner of Rainbow and Avoca Streets. A few temporary buildings were being erected at this time. Norman Taylor, who had become headmaster in 1952, led the move of the school, with 1956 seeing the first year of full occupation by students. The school was officially opened on 11 March 1959 by Robert Heffron, then the NSW Minister for Education, including the dedication of The W.M. Gollan Assembly Hall after the former Minister and long-serving Member for Randwick, William Gollan, who had assisted in the process leading to the establishment of Randwick Boys, and the R.J. Heffron Library.

In 1962 the Waratah Shield, the state knockout competition for rugby, was introduced and was won by Randwick in its first year, and again in 1975, 1978 and 1982. The cadet unit was also reformed in 1963, only to be disbanded again in the mid-1970s following the end of federal funding for cadet units. Due to the implementation of the Wyndham Scheme from 1962 to 1968, which created an extra year at school, overcrowding became a major problem and a new building scheme was initiated to deal with this problem. As a result, several new buildings and a library were completed, which were opened on 19 August 1976 by the Member for Coogee, Michael Cleary. Since the 1990s, Randwick Boys has participated in the Rock Eisteddfod Challenge (or The Show) jointly with its sister school, Randwick Girls' High School. Many places have been gained by the combined team, first reaching the finals in 1995, being a regular finalist since that time and winning the Premier Division in 2001, 2002, 2003, 2006 and 2007. It was nicknamed "The Show" and "Rock Eisteddfod".

== Amalgamation with Randwick Girls’ High School ==
In September 2023, it was announced that adjoining sites of Randwick Boys and Randwick Girls' High School would amalgamate into a single co-educational secondary school campus at a cost of $42 million, following pressure from parents.

== Notable alumni ==
- Alan Abadee AM RFD QC – Justice of the Supreme Court of New South Wales (1990–2000)
- Daryl Braithwaite – Australian pop singer best known as the lead vocalist of Sherbet
- Richard Butler AC – Australian diplomat and former Governor of Tasmania
- David Dale – writer, journalist, and ABC Radio broadcaster
- Robert Dewley – Member of NSW Parliament for Drummoyne (1947–1953)
- Mike Gallacher – former Member of NSW Legislative Council and Minister
- Alexander Glazer – Chairman of Molecular and Cell Biology at University of California, Berkeley. Elected to US National Academy of Sciences.
- George Glinatsis – Councillor of the City of Botany Bay (1991–2016) and Deputy Mayor (1995–2015)
- Andrew Robert Korda AM – obstetrician, gynaecologist, academic and medical administrator
- Stephen Kai Yim Lee AM – dermatologist, academic and medical administrator
- Air Marshal Sir Harold Martin KCB DSO DFC AFC – RAF officer, pilot and ADC to the Queen
- Max Metzker – Australian Olympic swimmer
- Bruce Notley-Smith – former Mayor of Randwick and Former Member of NSW Parliament for Coogee (2011–2019)
- George Souris – former Member of the NSW Parliament for Upper Hunter (1988–2015), former Leader of NSW National Party.
- Ray Stehr – Australian rugby league footballer
- Henri Szeps OAM – Australian film and theatre actor
- Joseph Tawadros AM – international Oud virtuoso performer
- Cyril Towers – Australian rugby union player
- Reece Robinson – Australian rugby league player
- Dick Thornett – Australian representative in rugby union, rugby league and water polo. Member of Sport Australia Hall of Fame.
- David Warner – Australian cricket player

== Houses ==
Randwick Boys has four representative houses that students are in by position from 2011:

- Vikings (green)
- Spartans (red)
- Titans (yellow)
- Romans (blue)

== See also ==
- List of government schools in New South Wales
- Rock Eisteddfod Challenge results (Australia)
