= Randwick =

- Suburb
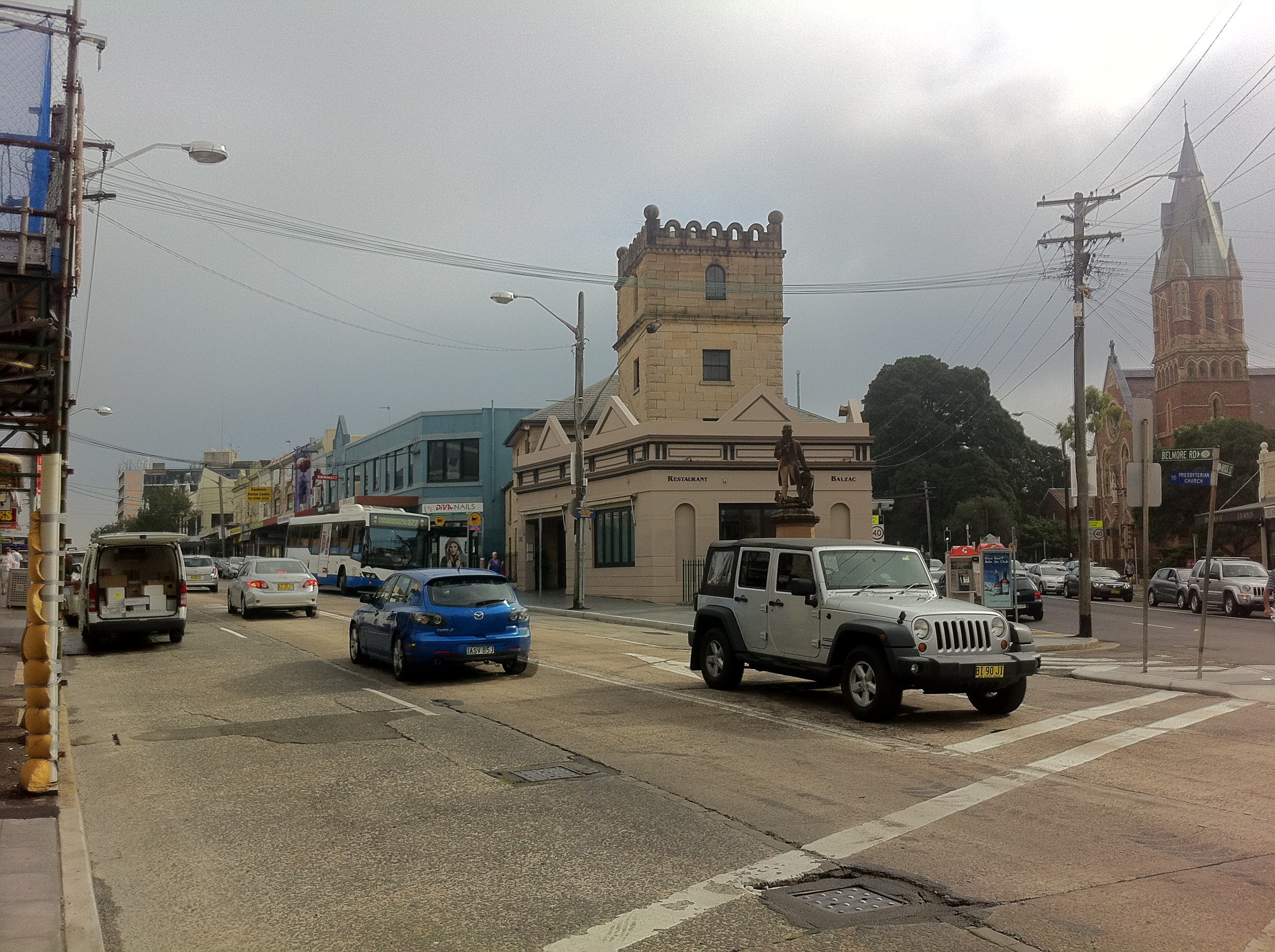

- Interactive map of Randwick
- Country: Australia
- State: New South Wales
- City: Sydney
- LGA: City of Randwick
- Location: 6 km (3.7 mi) south-east of Sydney CBD

Government
  - State electorates: Coogee; Heffron
  - Federal divisions: Kingsford Smith; Wentworth
- Elevation: 76 m (249 ft)

Population
  - Total: 28,943 (2021 census)
- Postcode: 2031
Suburbs around Randwick
| Centennial Park | Queens Park | Waverley |
| Kensington | Randwick | Coogee |
| Kingsford | Maroubra | South Coogee |

Randwick is a suburb in the Eastern Suburbs of Sydney, in the state of New South Wales, Australia. Randwick is located 6 kilometres south-east of the Sydney central business district and is the administrative centre for the local government area of the City of Randwick.

== History ==
Randwick was named after the village of Randwick, Gloucestershire, England, birthplace of Simeon Henry Pearce, who became Mayor of Randwick six times. Simeon, who migrated to Australia in 1842, and his brother James who arrived in 1848, were responsible for the founding and early development of Randwick. Simeon built the first stone house in the area in 1848, called Blenheim House, which can still be seen in Blenheim Street. It was neglected for some time in the mid-1900s, but was eventually acquired by Randwick City Council and restored.

Proclaimed as a Municipality in February 1859, and as a City in 1990, Randwick has a rich history and a number of heritage buildings. Another Mayor of Randwick, George Kiss, lived in the house known as Ventnor in the 1870s. A two-storey sandstone house, Ventnor was built by Alderman Edward Dawson in 1859, and is situated on Avoca Street, overlooking Coogee. It is now owned by the nearby Our Lady of the Sacred Heart Church (built 1888). Other buildings of note include the St Jude's Church group, also on Avoca Street. Originally designed by Edmund Blacket, (who also designed St. Andrew's Cathedral, Sydney and the University of Sydney), the church was completed in 1865. It was modified by H.M. Robinson in 1889. The rectory next door was built in 1870. The Verger's Residence, designed by Thomas Rowe and completed in 1862, was the original Randwick Municipal Chambers. This distinctive building, with its Gothic touches, was followed by the present Randwick Town Hall, which was built further north in Avoca Street in 1881. The church group and Ventnor are listed on the Register of the National Estate.

Further south down Avoca Street is the sandstone building with a tower, built in 1859 as an investment property by William Ellis, one of Randwick's first six elected aldermen. After briefly being used as the 'Star and Garter' Inn by Mrs Elizabeth Shipway, it was later the home of Captain Thomas Watson, who was responsible for commissioning the 1874 statue of Captain James Cook, sculpted by Walter McGill, which still stands at the south side of the building. Captain Watson also heightened the square tower, thus ensuring another distinctive landmark feature of the area. Close by is another even more imposing building in Randwick's heartland - the Prince of Wales Hospital, which started life as the Randwick Asylum for Destitute Children. Opened in 1858, it was partly financed by the legacy of Dr. Cuthill, whose name is commemorated by the adjacent Cuthill Street. The southern wing was added in 1863, by which time over 800 children were being cared for. In 1915, the Asylum buildings were finally deemed unsuitable as premises in which to provide a realistic home life for children, and they were then adapted for WWI use as a military and repatriation hospital. In 1953 the complex was officially renamed as the Prince of Wales Hospital, which continues to grow as a renowned medical facility.

Other noteworthy buildings include private homes like Ilfracombe, Clovelly and Torquay in Avoca Street, and Venice, in Frenchmans Road. The latter was built 1884–84 on part of St Mark's Glebe. The land had been leased in 1880 for 99 years to S.Holmes and J.Parsons. The house features Tudor and Gothic elements and has stained glass windows. It has been described as a "comparatively rare and distinctive example of late Victorian Gothic architecture retaining most of its detailing intact." It has a New South Wales heritage listing.

Another notable home was Sandgate, located in Belmore Road. This sandstone house was built circa 1870 on Crown land purchased by Simeon Pearce in 1853. It was bought by the Federal Government in the 1920s; it was then used as a Red Cross facility for First World War veterans. It was saved from demolition in 1978 and restored by Randwick Council.

The last Gothic mansion left in Randwick is Nugal Hall, located in Milford Street. It was designed by Mortimer Lewis and the southern portion of the house was built in 1853 for Alexander McArthur, a shipping merchant. The house features a staircase with glass dome above; the staircase was built of Mauritius mahogany and cedar. The coach house building at the front was originally a lodge for horse-drawn vehicles. The northern portion of the house was completed by Dr Fred Tidswell who owned the Coogee Bay Hotel. The architect of the northern portion is thought to have been Mortimer Lewis's son, Oswald. The Tidswell family owned the house from c. 1880–1903. Frederick Squire Tidswell (1831–1898) and his wife Mary Ann (1836–1912) had nine children including the microbiologist Dr Frank Tidswell (1867–1941) and architect Thomas Tidswell (1870–1950).

== Heritage listings ==
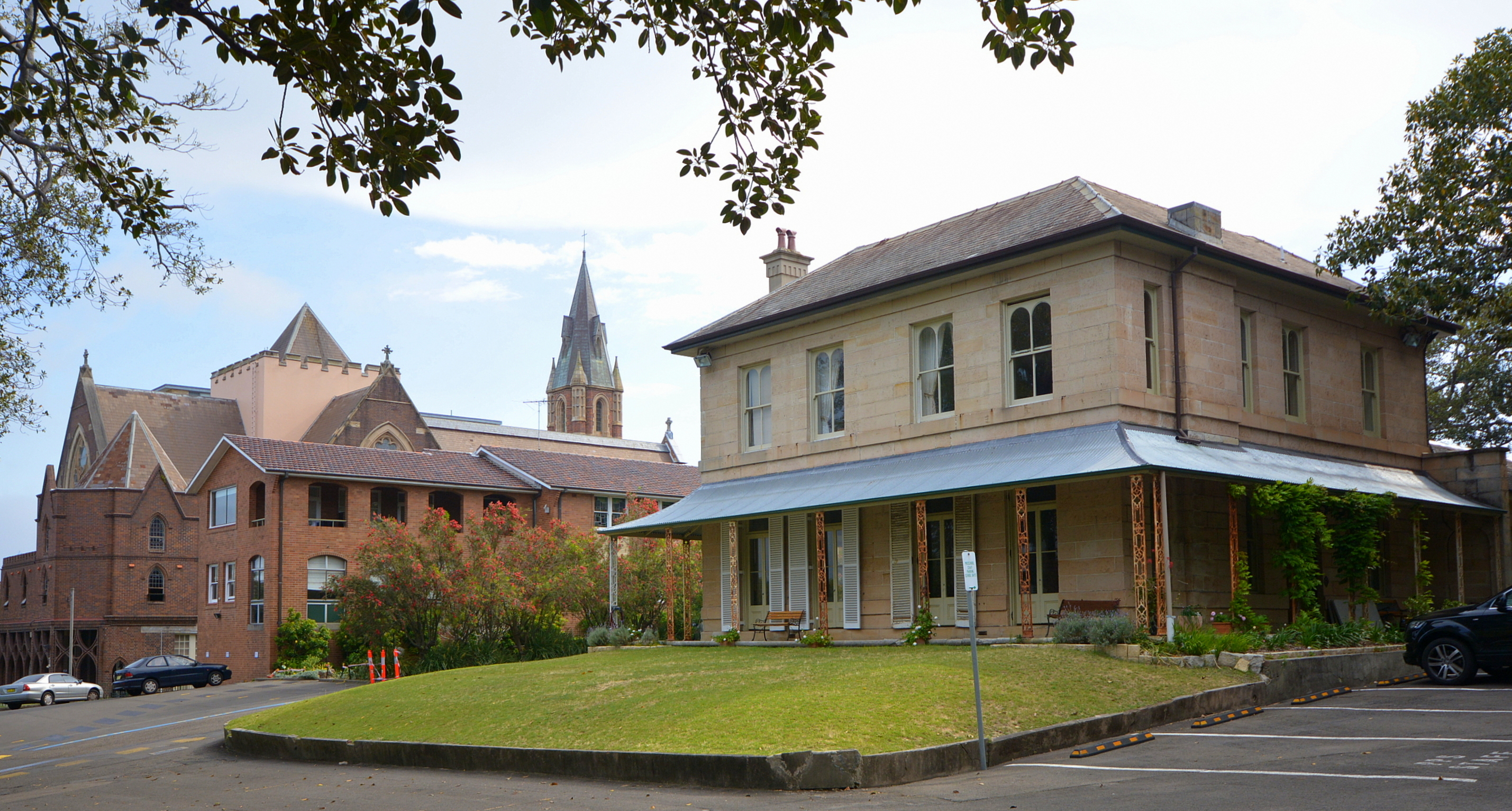
Ventnor, Avoca Street

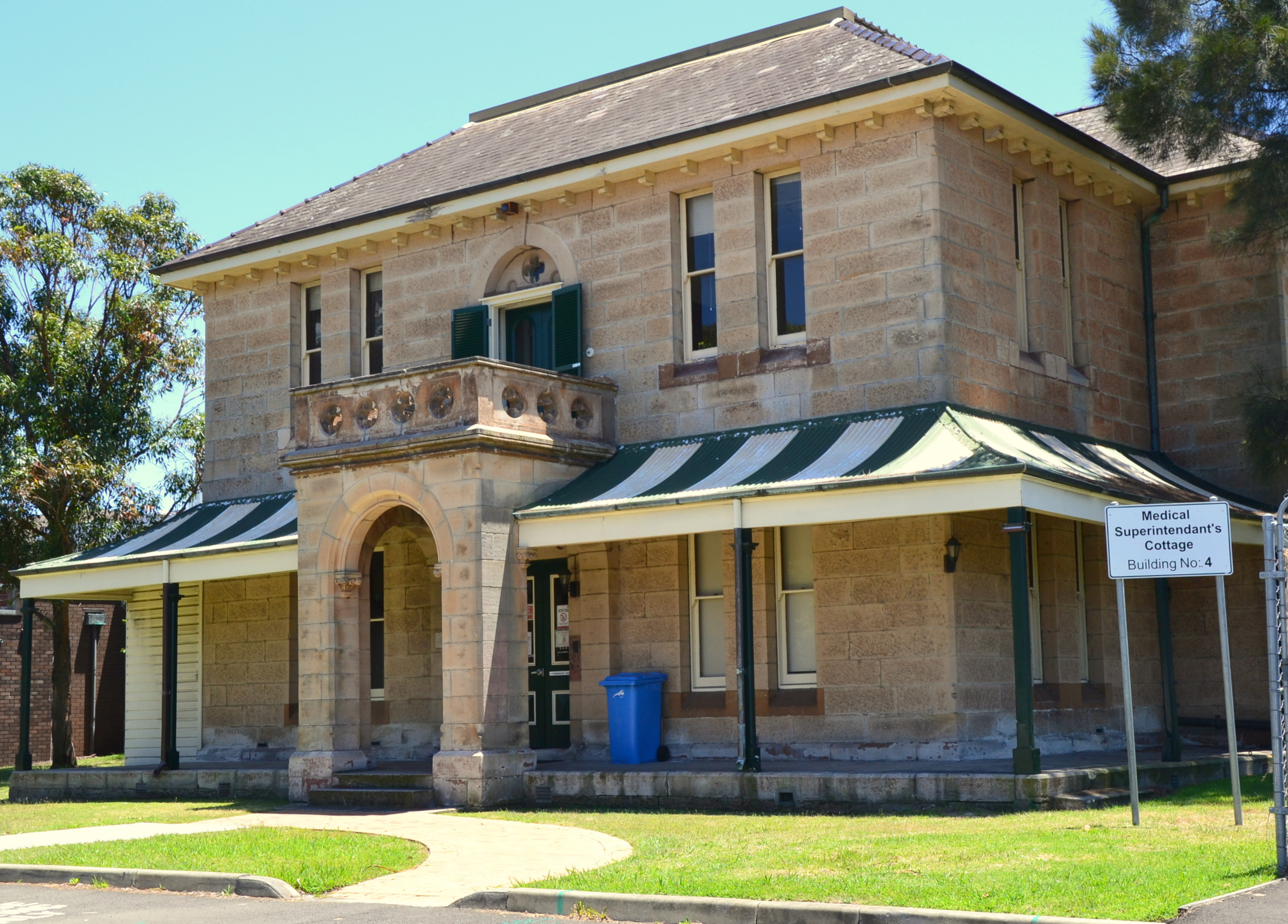
Superintendent's Cottage, Prince of Wales Hospital

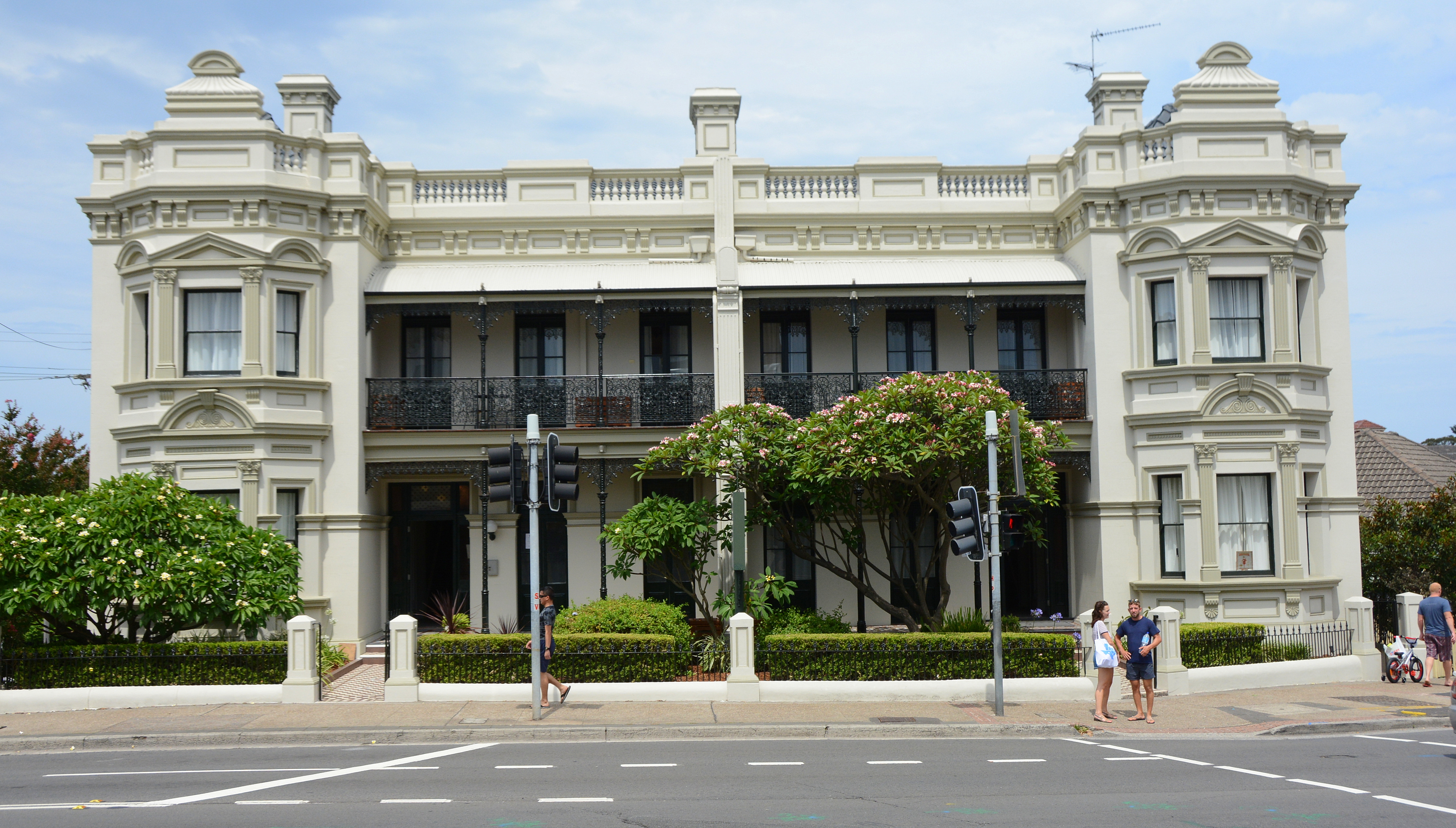
Corana and Hygeia, also known as Randwick Lodge, Avoca Street

Randwick has a number of heritage-listed sites, including the following sites listed on the New South Wales State Heritage Register:

- 124 Alison Road: Randwick Post Office
- 162 Alison Road: Randwick Presbyterian Church
- 102–108 Avoca Street: St Jude's Church, Randwick
- 211–215 Avoca Street: Corana and Hygeia
- 128 Belmore Road: Sandgate, Randwick
- 60 Bundock Lane: Electricity Substation No. 341
- 66 Frenchmans Road: Venice, Randwick
- 17 Gilderthorpe Avenue: Hooper Cottage
- 16–18 Milford Street: Nugal Hall
- 2S Frances Street: Electricity Substation No. 349
- 43 St Marks Road: Rathven, Randwick
- 43 St Pauls Street: Ritz Cinema, Sydney
- 18–20 Stanley Street: Emanuel School, Australia
- 26–42 The Avenue: Avonmore Terrace
- 29–39 Young Street: Big Stable Newmarket

The following structures are listed on the (now defunct) Register of the National Estate (unless stated otherwise), or the heritage schedule of Randwick Council's Local Environment Plan; the latter list includes approximately four hundred items.

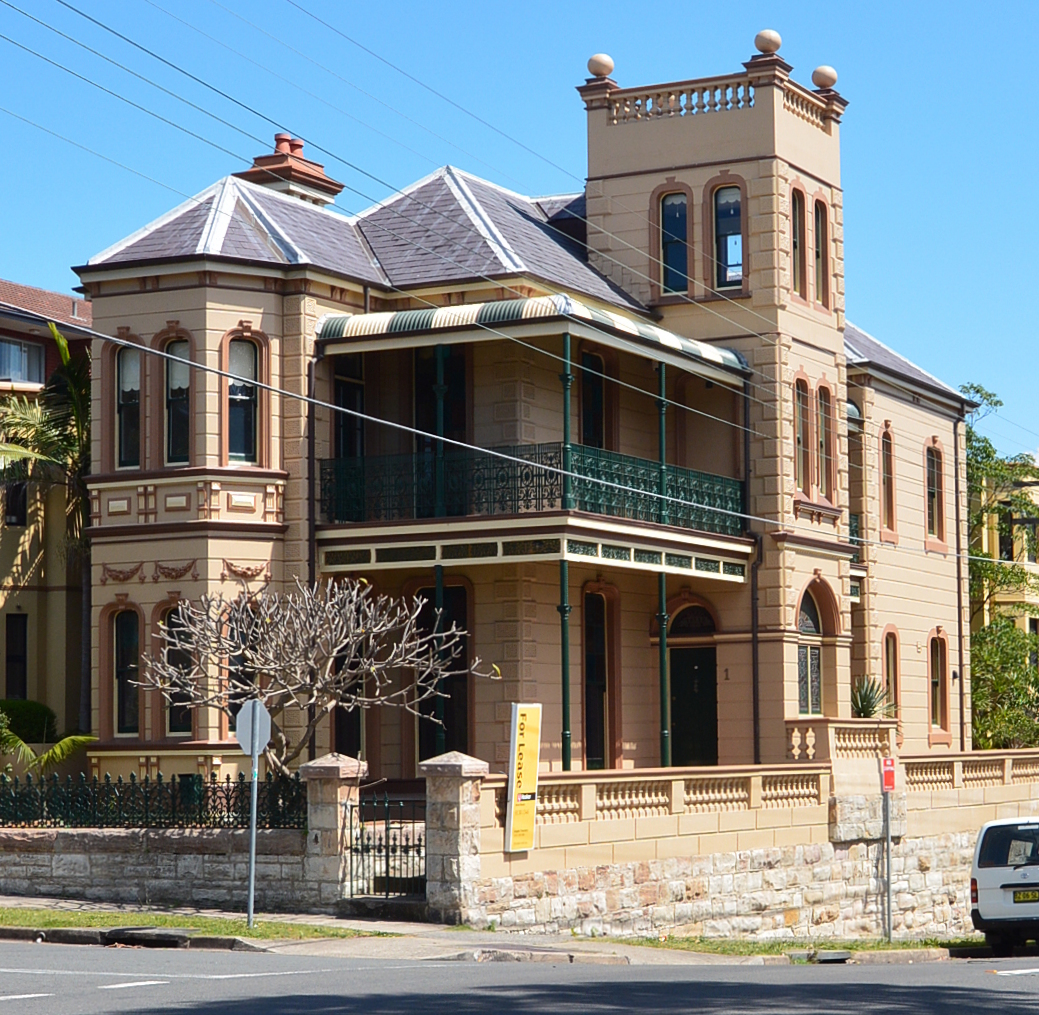
Tayar, The Avenue

- Ventnor
- Original Randwick Borough Chambers
- Goldring House and Attached Residence
- Prince of Wales Hospital Group
- Our Lady of the Sacred Heart Church
- The Park, Avoca and Cuthill Streets
- Ilfracrombe, Avoca Street, (circa 1906)
- Torquay, Avoca Street, (circa 1906)
- Clovelly, Avoca Street, (circa 1906)
- Newmarket House and The Big Stable, Barker and Young Streets
- Captain James Cook Statue, corner Belmore Road and Avoca Street
- Hannan's Butcher Shop (former Star and Garter Inn), Belmore Road
- Former Randwick Police Station, Coogee Bay Road
- Peckham, Cowper Street
- Essex, Cuthill Street
- House, 11 Cuthill Street
- Royal Hotel, Cuthill Street
- Shaldon, Darley Road
- Swan Isle, Darley Road
- Gordon Terrace, Gordon Street
- Members' Stand, Randwick Racecourse
- Busby Bore (Tunnel from Lachlan Swamp to Hyde Park, City)
- Tayar, The Avenue
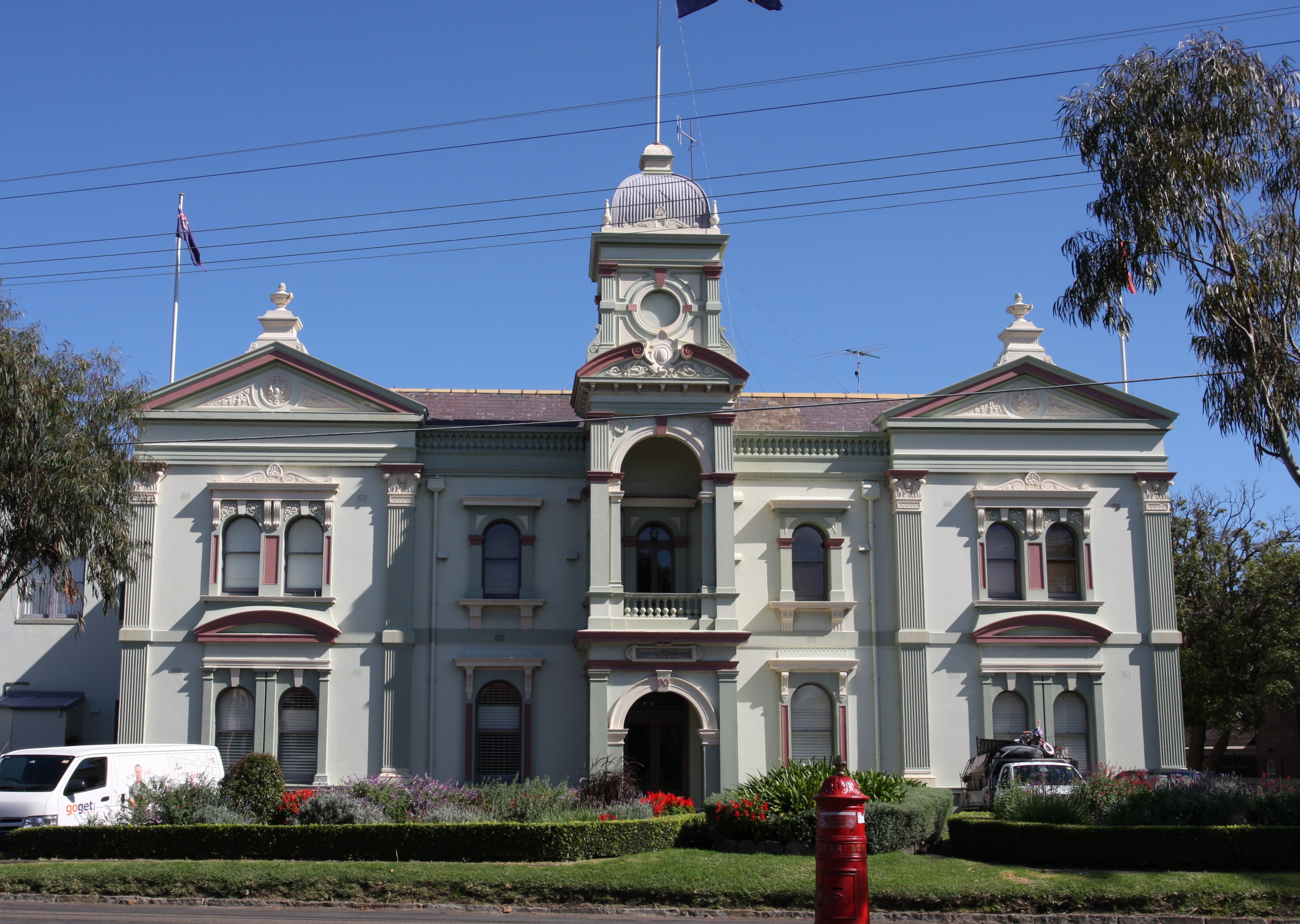
Randwick Town Hall

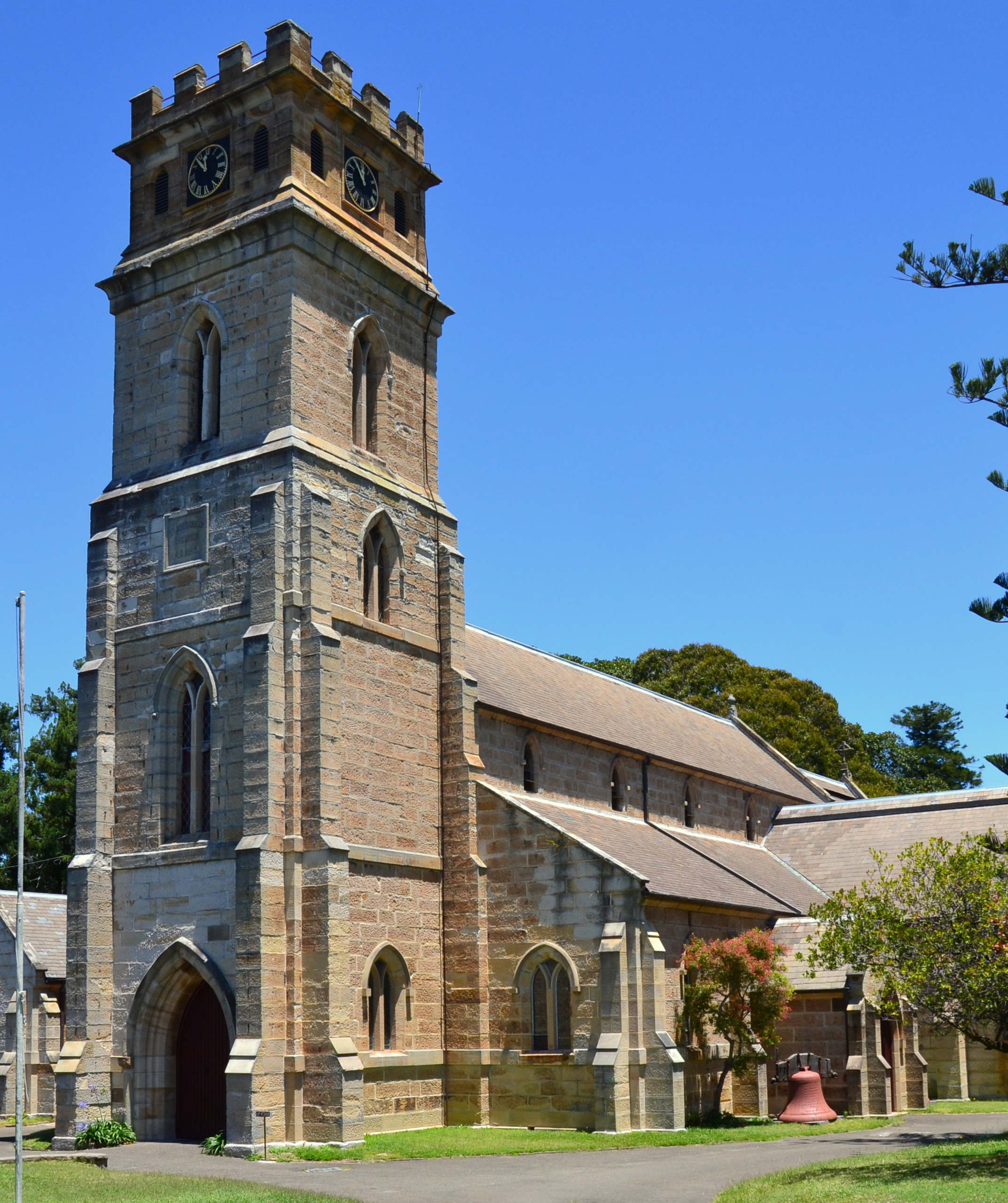
St Jude's Church, Avoca Street

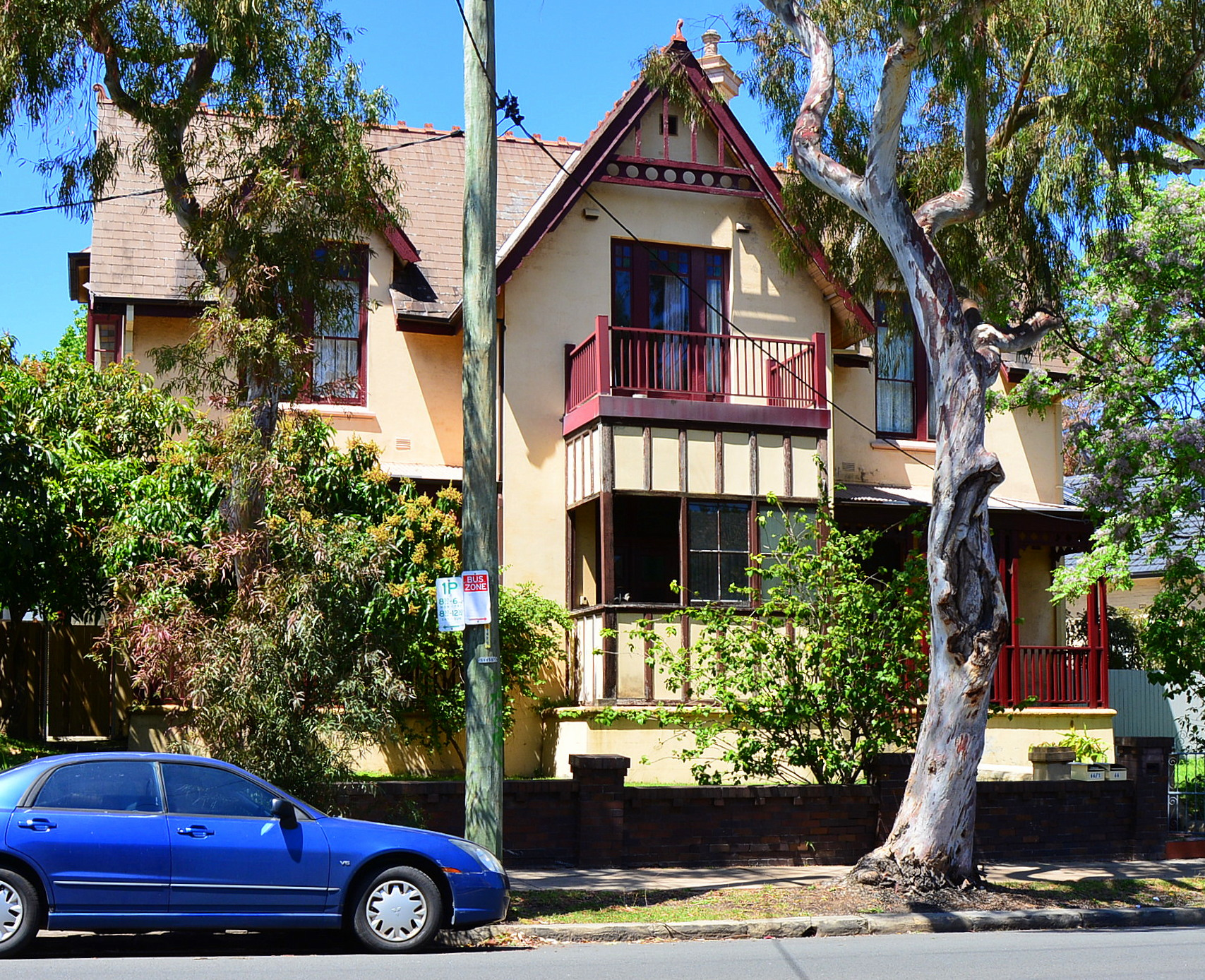
Venice, Randwick

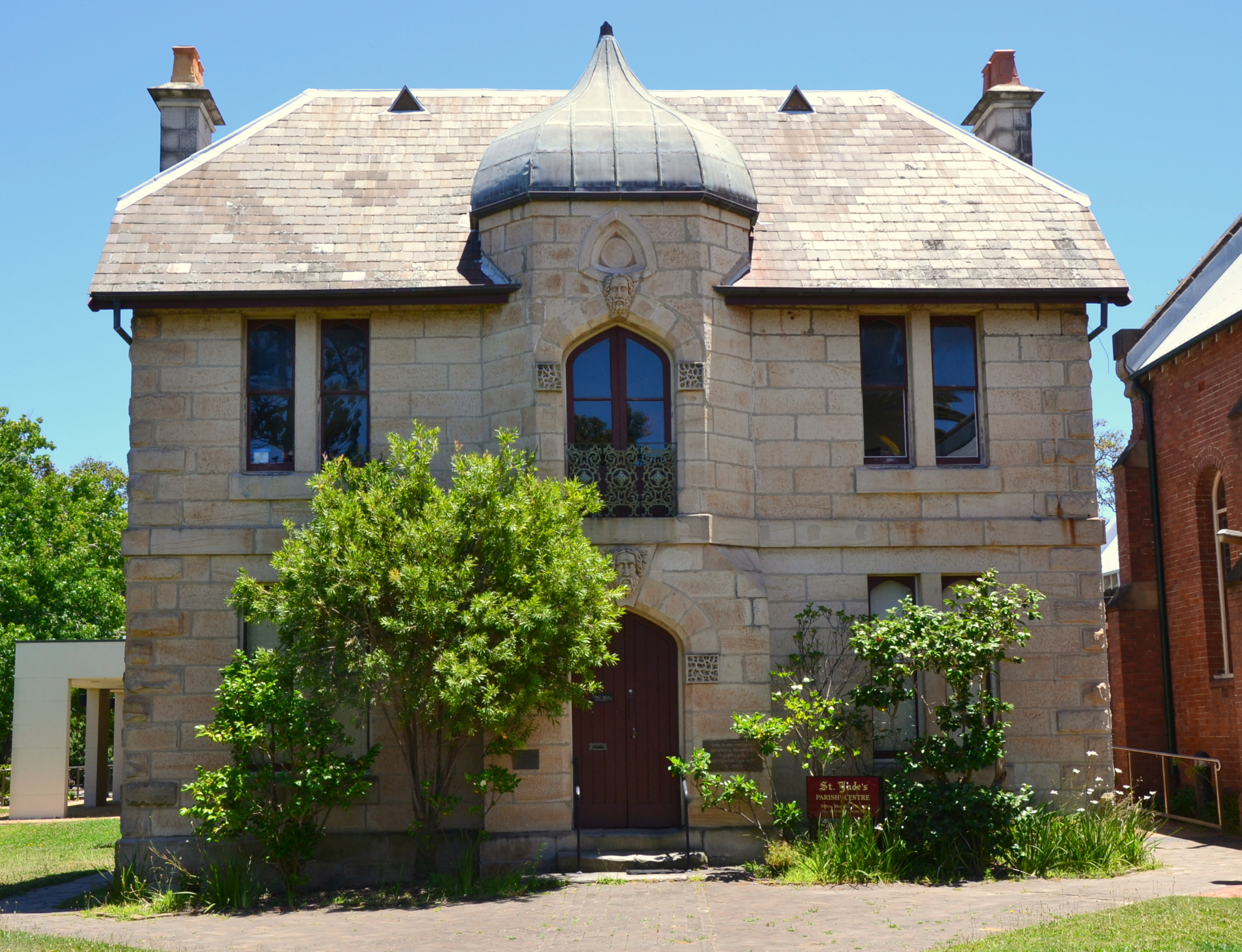
Randwick Borough Chambers

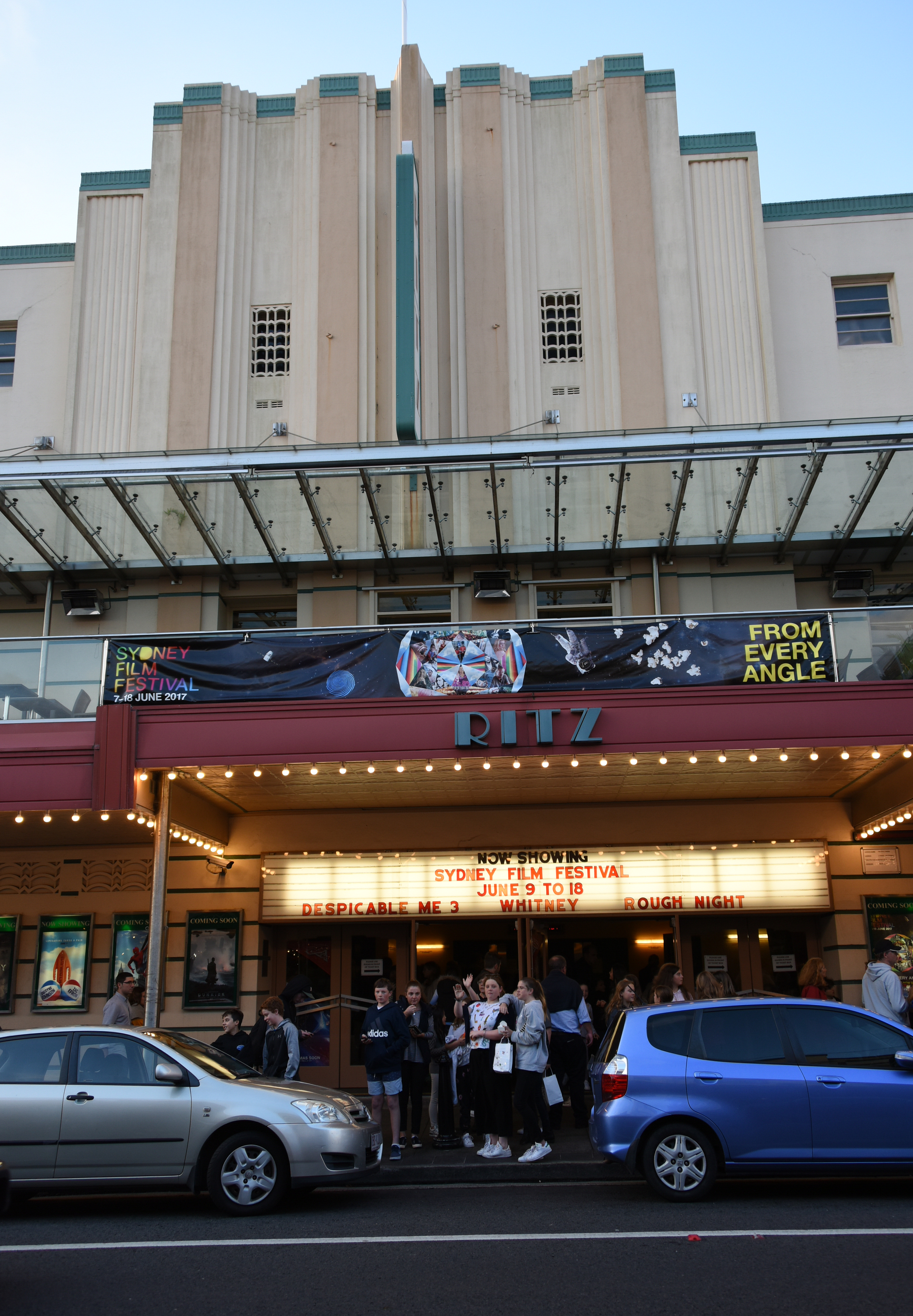
Ritz Cinema

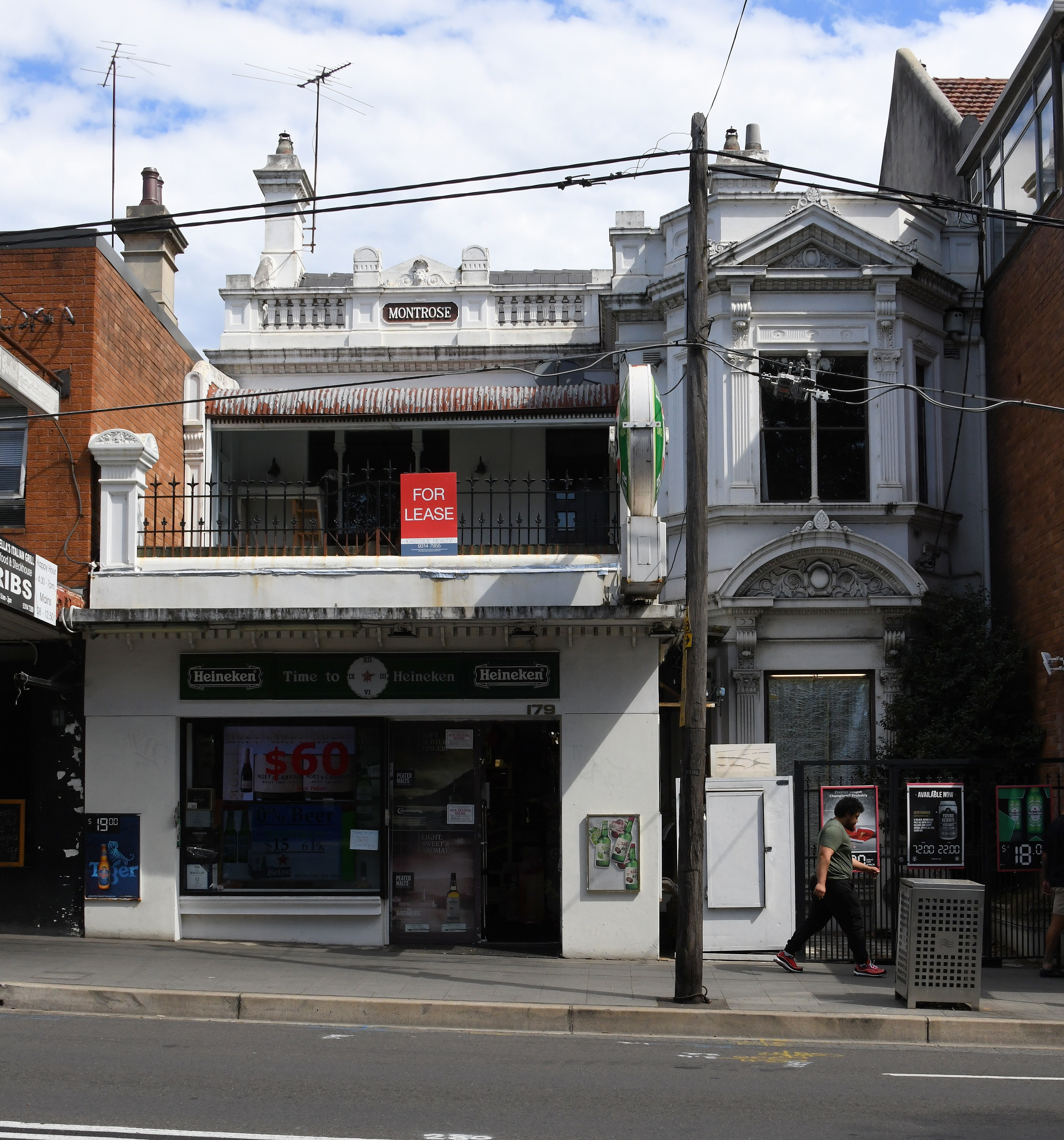
Montrose

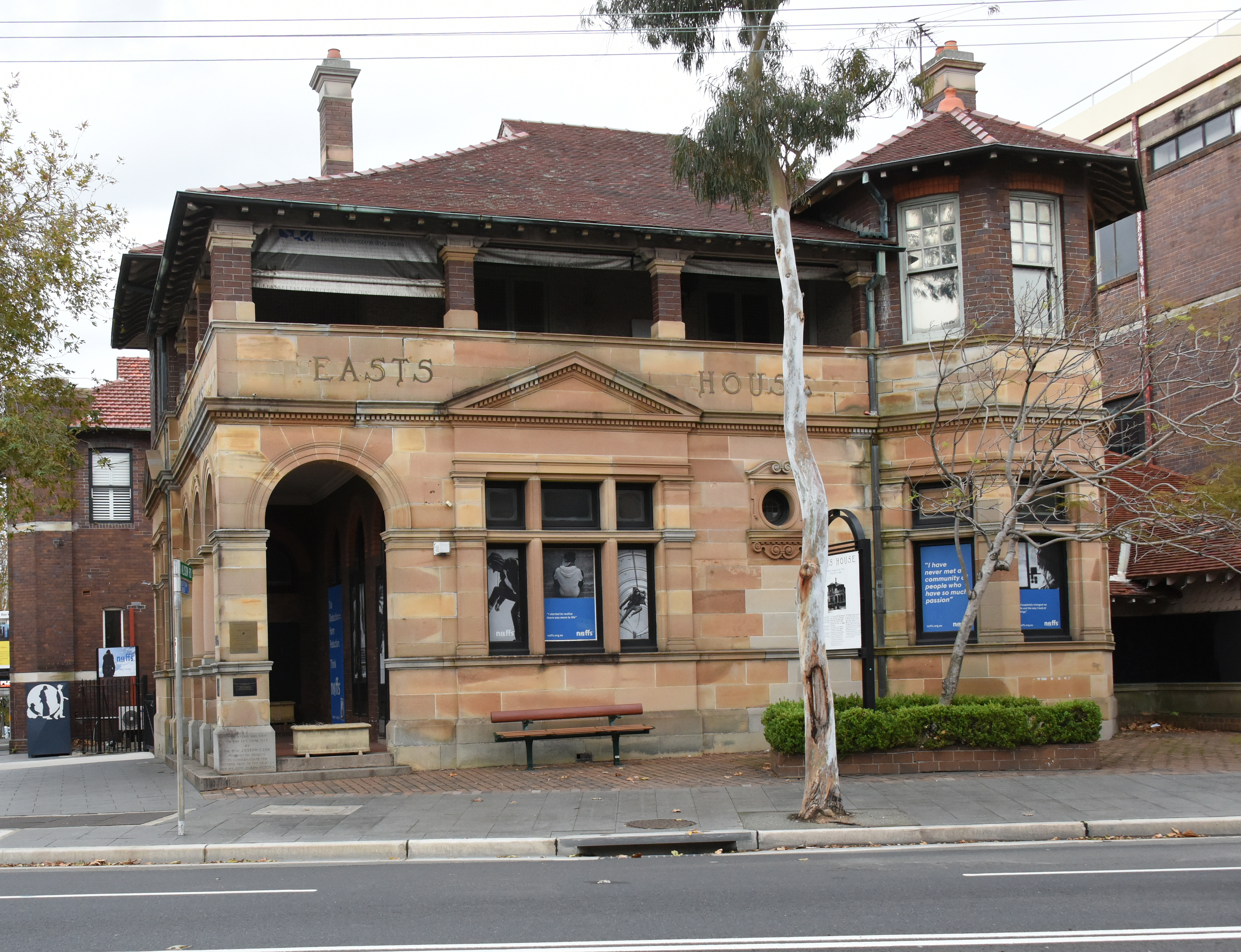
Former Randwick Post Office

== Demographics ==
In the 2021 Census, there were 28,943 people in Randwick, of which 52.9% were female and 47.1% were male. The most common ancestries in Randwick were 31.1% English, 22.2% Australian and 17.8% Irish. 73.5% of people only spoke English at home. Other languages spoken at home included 2.4% Mandarin, 1.9% Spanish, 1.5% Greek, 1.4% Portuguese and 1.3% French. The most common responses for religion were 41.0% no religion, 26.0% Roman Catholicism, 8.1% Anglicanism and 4.9% Judaism. The median weekly household income in Randwick was $2,442, which was 28.5% higher than the national median.

== Commercial area ==
Randwick is primarily a residential area. The Randwick Racecourse takes up a large portion in the north-west corner of the suburb. The Prince of Wales Hospital, Royal Hospital for Women, Sydney Children's Hospital and the Prince of Wales Private Hospital together occupy the Randwick Hospitals' Campus, a large contiguous campus bounded by Barker Street, Avoca Street, High Street and Hospital Road. A number of teaching and research facilities are also located on the campus. The campus is being expanded under a major project called the "Randwick Campus Redevelopment" project, which will see it expand west to the suburb boundary with Kensington and Kingsford. Prince Henry Hospital is also in Randwick.

The main commercial area is centred on Belmore Road. A range of retail stores are located at Belmore Road along with two shopping centres (Royal Randwick Shopping Centre, owned by Dexus and Randwick Plaza, which contains a Coles Supermarket) on eitherside of Belmore Road. Avoca Street is also quite popular for commerce, there is the 150-year-old Coach and Horses Hotel. Where the two busy streets meet is the gourmet Cookhouse, a heritage sandstone building with a statue of Captain Cook outside and High Cross Park, with a war memorial. Within one kilometre, Coogee is another retail precinct offering good food services while enjoying the great view of the beach. St Pauls Road junction also wins good fame for its popular restaurants, cafés and recreational facilities. Randwick's main entertainment district is The Spot, located in the suburb's south-east, which contains the Randwick Ritz cinema, a famous art deco cinema which dates from the 1930s and numerous cafes, bars and restaurants.

== Churches ==
- Our Lady of the Sacred Heart Catholic Church
- St Jude's Anglican Church
- East Sydney Community Christian Church
- Randwick Presbyterian Church
- Canvas Church
- Rhema Church of God

== Sport and recreation ==
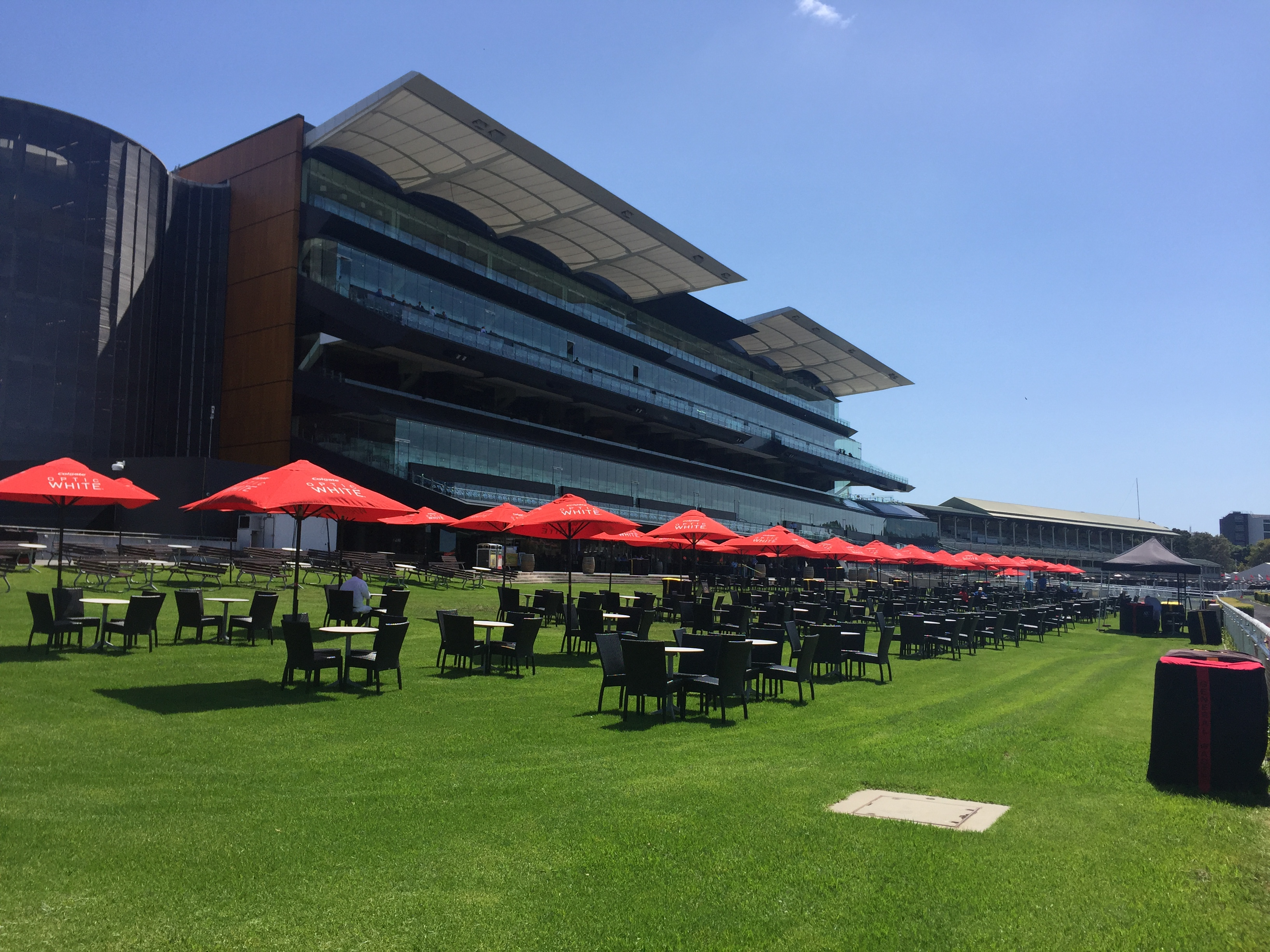
Royal Randwick Racecourse

In the NRL Randwick has been represented by the Sydney Roosters since the formation of the league and the original articles of association in 1908. Despite some junior league teams being shifted over time, at representative level the suburb is still classified as being represented by the Sydney Roosters.

Just 6 kilometres east of Sydney's CBD, the City of Randwick, once known as the 'Sports Coast' is home to some 29 km of coastline, 10 beaches and bays and many major recreation facilities. Randwick City is one of the most visited tourist areas outside central Sydney, attracting some 13 million visits each year. The city is home to the Coastal Walkway, Randwick Racecourse, Coogee and Maroubra Beaches, Botany Bay National Park, Centennial Parklands (which includes Queens Park and Moore Park), several top class golf courses and major institutions including the University of New South Wales and the Prince of Wales Hospitals.

A number of well-known sporting teams represent the local area. Since 1882 the Randwick District Rugby Union Football Club nicknamed the 'Galloping Greens' or 'The Wicks' have represented the district in the Sydney premier grade rugby competition, the 'Shute Shield' and play their home games at the picturesque Coogee Oval. The local cricket team Randwick Petersham Cricket Club plays in the Sydney Grade Cricket domestic competition and was formed through a merger between Randwick and Petersham Cricket Clubs.

The former Randwick Post Office building in the centre of Randwick Junction (corner of Alison Road and Avoca Street) is known as Easts House. The building is owned by the Sydney Roosters (Eastern Suburbs Rugby League Club), which has donated the building for use by the Ted Noffs Foundation, for the purpose of providing assistance to troubled youth in the district. There are numerous community or corner parks like Alison Park, Randwick Peace Park, Frank Doyle Park, Fred Hollows Reserve and Writtle Park in the locality of Randwick used for recreational and sporting purposes.

== Schools ==
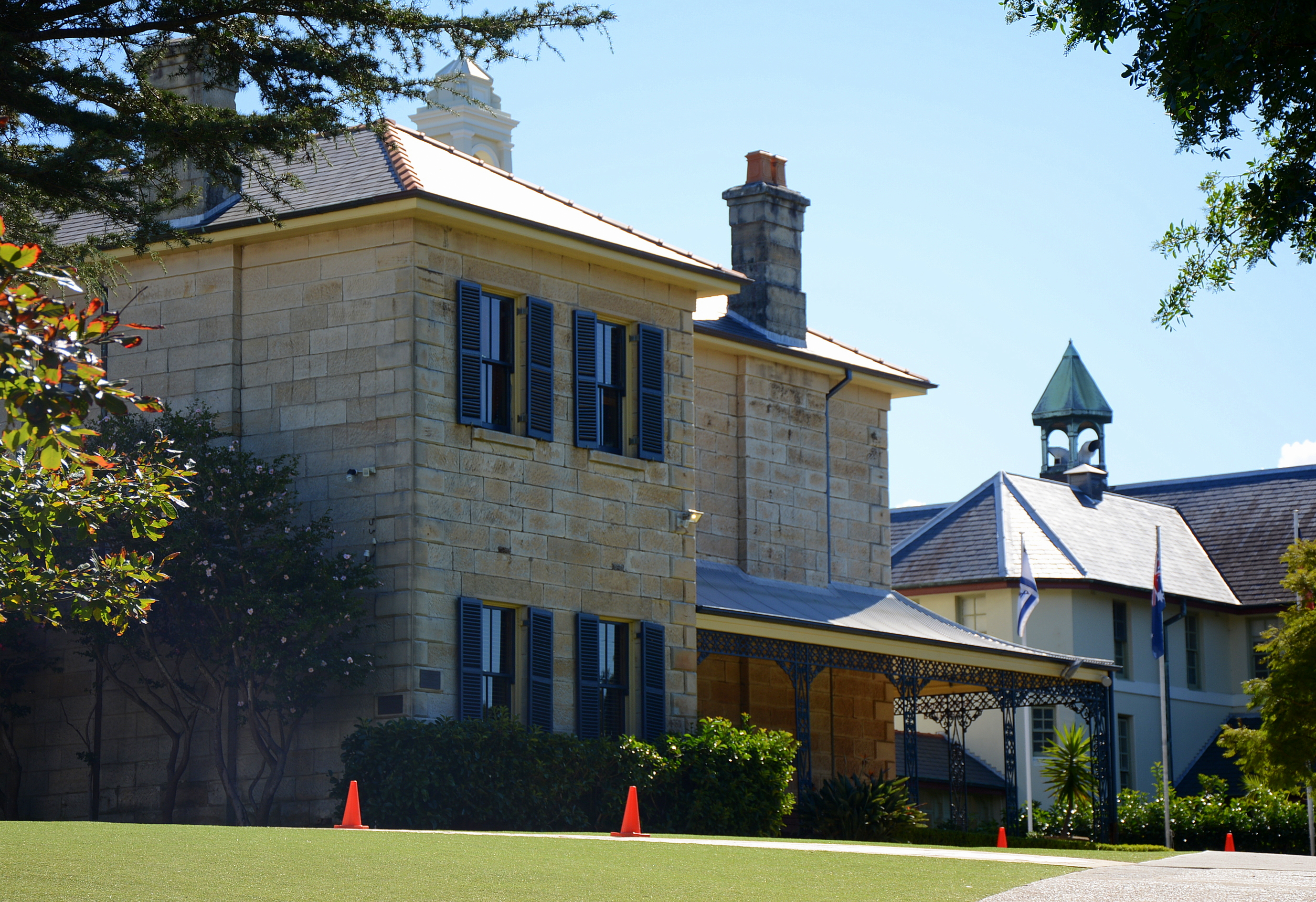
Emanuel School

Primary schools in the area include Our Lady of the Sacred Heart, Coogee Public School, Claremont College, Randwick Public School, Coogee Preparatory School, and Rainbow Street Primary. Secondary schools include two systemic Catholic schools, Brigidine College and Marcellin College, a Jewish day school Emanuel School and three state schools, Randwick Boys High School, Randwick Girls' High School, and the Open High School. Randwick North High School was closed in 2001 and the site was divided between Open High School and Randwick Public School.

There are branch campuses of the University of New South Wales and Sydney Institute of TAFE located on King Street, between the Racecourse and Centennial Park.

== Transport ==
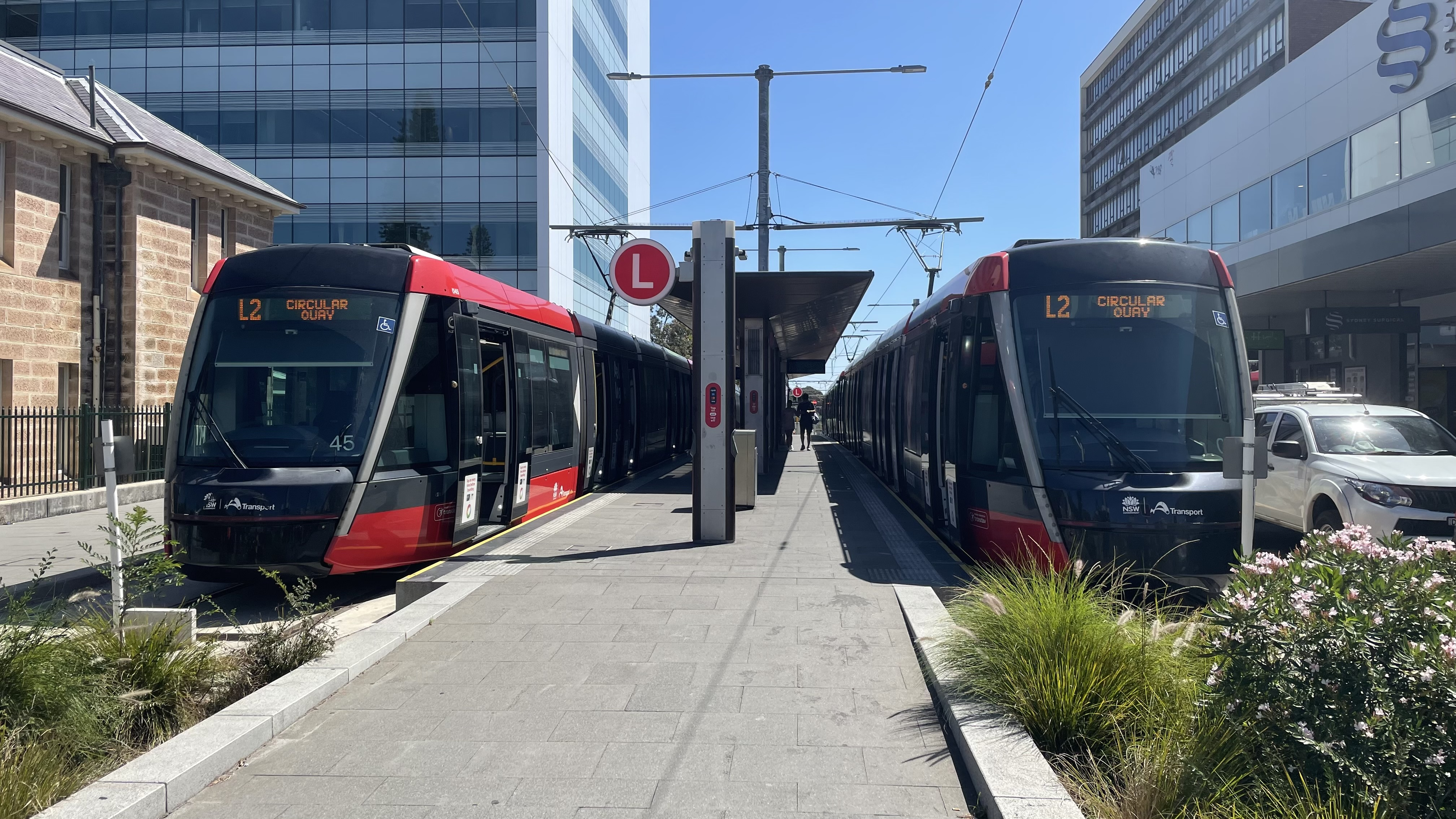
Randwick light rail stop

Until December 2019, Randwick was only served by buses. The main bus corridor is Belmore Road with buses to Bondi Junction, Coogee, Eastgardens, Maroubra, Sydney Airport and Sydney CBD.

The Randwick Line of Sydney's light rail network terminates in the suburb at Randwick station.

== Notable people ==
The following people are residents or former residents of Randwick.

- Amy Vera Ackman – hospital administrator
- Len Allmond – rugby league player
- Doug Ayres – Australian rules footballer
- Thomas Barkell – flying ace
- John Baxter – author and journalist
- Henry Bland – public servant
- Kevin Brennan – actor
- Henry Burrell – naturalist
- Bruce Caldwell – rugby union player
- Esma Cannon – actress
- John Carrick – politician
- Michael Cleary – rugby league and union player
- Dylan Collard – soccer player
- Bill Cosgrove – Australian rules footballer
- Frederick Crouch – politician
- Geoff Davies – cricketer
- John Earnshaw – engineer and inventor
- Reg Ellis – cricketer and Australian rules footballer
- Lauryn Eagle – boxer and water skier
- Reg Farnell – rugby league player
- William Patrick Fitzgerald – Lord Mayor of Sydney
- Doug Freeman – cricketer
- Clifford Grant – singer
- Sandy Harbutt – actor and director
- Dean Hawkins – rugby league player
- Mirrie Hill – composer
- Jacques Hilling – actor
- Fred Hollows – ophthalmologist
- Bob Hornery – actor
- Sarah Hynes – botanist and teacher
- Peter Garrett – musician and politician
- Syd Gregory – cricketer
- Lauri Kennedy – cellist
- Antony Kidman – psychologist and academic
- Edward Hope Kirkby – watchmaker
- Col Loughnan – musician
- Raecene McGregor – rugby league player
- Frederick Menkens – architect
- Paulini – singer
- John Peden – jurist and politician
- Dick Persson – public servant
- Oliver Puflett – soccer player
- Tom Mead – politician
- Patrick Rowe – cricketer
- Jason Sangha – cricketer
- Gabi Simpson – netballer
- John Solomon – rugby union player
- Ryan Teague – soccer player
- Mary Tindale – botanist
- Jessica Thornton – sprinter
- Quinton Tidswell – artist
- Frank Wall – doctor and politician
- Colin Windon – rugby union player and soldier
- Keith Windon – rugby union player
- Mervyn Wood – rower and police officer
- Tom Wright – rugby union player
