= Stephen Kai Yim Lee =

Chinese-Australian dermatologist (1948–2023)

Stephen Kai Yim Lee AM
- Born: 1948; China
- Died: 2023 (aged 74–75)
- Education: Randwick Boys High School
- Alma mater: University of Sydney
- Occupations: Dermatologist; academic; medical administrator
- Employer: University of Sydney
- Spouse: Theresa Lee

Stephen Kai Yim Lee AM (1948–2023) was a Chinese-Australian dermatologist, clinical professor, and medical administrator.

== Early life and education ==
Lee was born in 1948 in mainland China and moved to Hong Kong as an infant. After his mother's death when he was four years old, he was raised by his father, and was educated at the Randwick Boys High School.

At age 16, Lee relocated to Sydney through an educational sponsorship. He attended the University of Sydney, graduating with first-class honours in medicine in 1974.

== Career ==
In 1981, Lee became a Fellow of the Australasian College of Dermatologists and established a dermatology practice in Sydney's inner west. He held senior roles at Royal Prince Alfred Hospital and Concord Hospital, serving as the head of department at Concord.

Lee also served as honorary secretary of the Australasian College of Dermatologists beginning in 2001, and was the first dermatologist elected to the Federal Council of the AMA, where he advocated for ethical medical practice and social justice. Lee taught extensively in Australia, China, and Hong Kong, and was appointed clinical professor at the University of Sydney and an honorary professor at the Chinese University of Hong Kong. In 2009, he was appointed as a Member of the Order of Australia (AM) for service to medicine.
