= Petersham Girls High School =

Information
- Established: 1878
- Closed: 1989
- Authority: New South Wales Department of Education
- Years: 7–12
- Gender: Female
- Language: English

Petersham Girls High School was a girls high school in the suburb of Petersham, Sydney, Australia. It closed in 1989.

== History ==
The school was located at 35 West Street, Petersham and is now the NSW School of Languages. It opened in 1878, and was merged with Newtown Boys High School to form the Newtown High School of the Performing Arts in 1990.

== Notable alumni ==
- Sandra Nori, NSW politician and government minister

== See also ==
- List of government schools in New South Wales: G–P
