= Andrew Korda =

Australian obstetrician and gynecologist

Andrew Robert Korda AM
- Occupations: Medical Doctor, Surgeon, Gynecologist
- Years active: 1967-present
- Known for: Pelvic floor dysfunction research

Andrew Robert Korda AM is an Australian obstetrician and gynecologist. He is a subspecialist in urogynaecology and in 2011 became a Member of the Order of Australia for his outstanding contributions to medicine.

== Early life ==
Andrew Robert Korda was born to parents Tibor and Tereze Korda, who immigrated to Australia from Hungary in 1957. He attended Randwick Boys High School from 1957 - 1959 where he is listed as a notable alumnus.

== Career ==
Following graduation in Medicine (MBBS) from the University of Sydney, Korda undertook his specialist training in Obstetrics and Gynaecology at the Royal Prince Alfred Hospital in Sydney, with further training in Oxford, United Kingdom and New York City. During his career as a specialist Obstetrician and Gynaecologist, he has held positions as Senior Surgeon, Chairman, Senior Gynaecological Reviewer for Sentinel and Critical Events, Head of Department and Consultant Emeritus at leading hospitals, as well as treating patients in his own private practice and being an expert witness. He has also held senior research and teaching positions at universities and hospitals in several countries, including the position of Chief Examiner in Urogynaecology of the Royal Australian and New Zealand College of Obstetricians and Gynaecologists, Foundation Professor in Obstetrics and Gynaecology at Western Sydney University and is a Fellow of the Royal College of Obstetricians and Gynaecologists.

After studying at the Beth Israel Medical Center Urodynamic Unit, Professor Korda approached the administration at Royal Prince Alfred Hospital and received funding to set up a urodynamic unit, which he co-ordinated with the Departments of Urology and Radiology. This was the first urodynamic Unit set up outside Richard Millard's unit, operating from the X-ray department of what was then King George V Memorial Hospital.

As part of the Urodynamic Unit at Royal Prince Alfred Hospital in 1981, he became an accredited subspecialist in pelvic floor muscle disorder and reconstructive pelvic surgery in 1989. By recognising the prevalence of bladder and pelvic floor issues amongst women, and the importance of treatment based on specific and accurate diagnosis, Korda became a founding partner of the Sydney Urodynamic Centre in 1980.

He has received master's degrees in both art and health law from the University of Sydney and is currently a guest speaker, Consultant Emeritus at the Royal Prince Alfred Hospital, Trustee of the Australian Bladder Foundation and Conjoint Professor in Obstetrics and Gynaecology at Western Sydney University.

== Awards ==
- Member of the Order of Australia
- Mabel Elizabeth Leaver Prize for Obstetrics
- Aisling Memorial Society Prize
- Chenhall Travelling Fellow in Gynaecology
- Searle Travelling Fellowship

== Personal life ==
Korda has an interest in classical music and is a patron of the Sydney Symphony Orchestra.

== Selected publications ==
Korda has contributed substantially to education and training and is the author of 104 original articles

Some examples are listed below:

- Korda, Andrew R., et al. "Assessment of possible luteolytic effect of intra-ovarian injection of prostaglandin F 2α in the human." Prostaglandins 9.3 (1975): 443-449.
- Korda, Andrew, et al. "The value of clinical symptoms in the diagnosis of urinary incontinence in the female." Australian and New Zealand Journal of Obstetrics and Gynaecology 27.2 (1987): 149-151.
- Korda, Andrew, Brian Peat, and Peter Hunter. "Experience with silastic slings for female urinary incontinence." Australian and New Zealand Journal of Obstetrics and Gynaecology 29.2 (1989): 150-154.
- Kesby, Gregory J. & Andrew R. Korda. "Migration of a Filshie clip into the urinary bladder seven years after laparoscopic sterilisation." BJOG: An International Journal of Obstetrics & Gynaecology 104.3 (1997): 379-382.
- Dietz, Hans Peter & Andrew Korda. "Which bowel symptoms are most strongly associated with as rectocele?." Australian and New Zealand journal of obstetrics and gynaecology 45.6 (2005): 505-508.
- Korda, Andrew. "Where to with treatment of pelvic organ prolapse in 2014?."Medicine Today 14.5 (2014): 63-67.
