= David Dale (author) =

Australian journalist (1948–2025)

- Born: 27 March 1948; Sydney, New South Wales, Australia
- Died: 6 August 2025 (aged 77)
- Education: University of Sydney
- Occupations: Author; journalist; travel writer; television commentator; lecturer; international correspondent; political reporter; radio broadcaster

David Dale (27 March 1948 – 6 August 2025) was an Australian Walkley Award-winning author, journalist and travel writer, television commentator, lecturer, international correspondent, political reporter and radio broadcaster.

== Early life and education ==
Dale was born in Sydney, New South Wales, the son of psychologist Keith Dale and his wife university secretary Leigh Dale and grew up in the Eastern Suburbs of Sydney. He attended Coogee Primary School and then Randwick Boys High School. He graduated from Sydney University with an honours degree in psychology before pursuing journalism.

== Career ==
Dale wrote on travel, food and popular culture for newspapers The Sydney Morning Herald and The Age, did media commentary for the ABC and taught media at the University of New South Wales, Sydney.

He created the humorous column "Stay in Touch" for The Sydney Morning Herald in 1981 and edited it for four years before being appointed the paper's New York correspondent in 1986. He wrote "The Tribal Mind" media column for 20 years. He won a Walkley Award in 1984 for a feature called "The Italian Waiters Conspiracy". He has also served as a political reporter for The Australian, a sub-editor for General Practitioner (London), features editor of The Sydney Morning Herald, editor of The Bulletin and broadcaster for ABC radio and 2GB Sydney. He was also a journalism lecturer at the University of Technology in Sydney.

== Death ==
Dale died on 6 August 2025, at the age of 77.

== Bibliography ==
- Coastline – The shared food of Mediterranean France, Italy and Spain. Murdoch Books. 2017. ISBN 978-1-74336-734-6.
- Anatolia – Adventures in Turkish Cooking. Murdoch Books. 2015. ISBN 978-1-74336-081-1.
- The Art of Pasta. Penguin. 2011. ISBN 978-1-921382-28-4.
- The Little Book of Australia – A snapshot of who we are. Allen & Unwin. 2010. ISBN 978-1-74237-211-2.
- Buon Ricordo: How to make your home a great restaurant. Allen & Unwin. 2009. ISBN 978-1-74175-727-9.
- Lucio's Ligurian Kitchen: The food of the Italian Riviera. Allen & Unwin. 2008. ISBN 978-1-74175-077-5.
- Soffritto: A delicious Ligurian memoir. Allen & Unwin. 2007. ISBN 978-1-74175-076-8.
- Who We Are – A snapshot of Australia today. Allen & Unwin. 2006. ISBN 978-1-74175-087-4.
- The Perfect Journey. Pan Macmillan. 2001. ISBN 0-330-36280-1.
- The 100 Things Everyone Needs to Know about Italy. Pan Macmillan. 1998. ISBN 0-330-36083-3.
- The 100 Things Everyone Needs to Know about Australia. Pan Macmillan. 1997. ISBN 0-330-36054-X.
- Essential Places. Pan Macmillan. 1996. ISBN 978-0-330-35858-3.
- The Obsessive Traveller, or Why I don't steal towels from great hotels any more. Angus and Robertson. 1991. ISBN 0-207-16991-8.
- An Australian in America: First Impressions & Second Thoughts on the World's Strangest Nation. Salem House Publishers. 1989. ISBN 0-318-41611-5.
- The Official Foodie Handbook – Australian edition. Doubleday. 1985. ISBN 0-86824-165-2.
