= Randwick North High School =

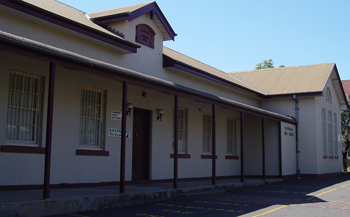
- Former school administration block

Location
- Randwick, New South Wales; Australia; 33.9106°S 151.2432°E

Information
- Type: Public, secondary, co-educational, day school
- Motto: Latin: Fidem Petamus (Confidence in ability.)
- Established: January 1966
- Status: Closed
- Closed: 2001
- Principal: Lex Howarth; Ed Deadman; Tom Hobson
- Grades: 7–12
- Campus: Avoca and Cowper Streets
- Colours: Prussian blue and white

Randwick North High School was an Australian co-educational high school which operated from 1966 to 2001 in the suburb of Randwick, New South Wales. The site is now home to Randwick Public School and Centennial Park School.

== History ==
The history of Randwick North High dates back to 1883, when Randwick Public School was established by the NSW Government. The school, to accommodate 200 students, was built on land at the top of Avoca Street, Randwick in 1886. This building was to form part of Randwick North High School. The senior functions of the school became a Superior Public School in 1913, a Junior High School in 1944 and finally split between Girls and Boys High Schools in 1949, who eventually moved further south down Avoca street. The primary school operated from their buildings on Cowper Street which was completed in 1924, which grew steadily and frequent building additions were made.

To accommodate increasing student enrolments in the Randwick area in the 1950s-60s, a new co-educational high school was planned for the former site of Randwick High School in between Randwick Town Hall and Public School. This became Randwick North High School, which was opened in 1966. During the 1970s, the school staff included executive members of the New South Wales Teachers Federation Rosemary Child and Don Hayward. The school staff were at the forefront of industrial action to secure better conditions for students. In the late 1970-80s it was also the location of the Open High School which became NSW School of Languages.

Randwick North was closed in 2001 and the site was divided between the Open High School Sydney and Randwick Public School. In 2018, the Open High School moved to Petersham (as the NSW School of Languages). The Randwick site is now shared by Randwick Public School and Centennial Park School.

== Notable alumni ==
- Corey Adams – rugby league player and lifeguard
- Jennifer Betts – magistrate of the Local Court of New South Wales
- Scott Benjamin Gracie – author
- Sujata Bose Sinha – assistant professor of Rust College
- Simon Bouda – television journalist for Nine News Sydney
- Greg Hilder – author
- Mark Maclure – Australian football player
- Theo Onisforou – lawyer, property developer and multimillionaire
- Karin Sowada – former Australian Democrats Senator

=== Former staff ===
- Barry Collier OAM – former Member for Miranda
- Russell Fairfax – rugby union and rugby league player and coach
- Bob Outterside – rugby union international player and coach
- Jane Zemiro – academic and author, mother of Julia Zemiro
