= Electricity Substation No. 349 =

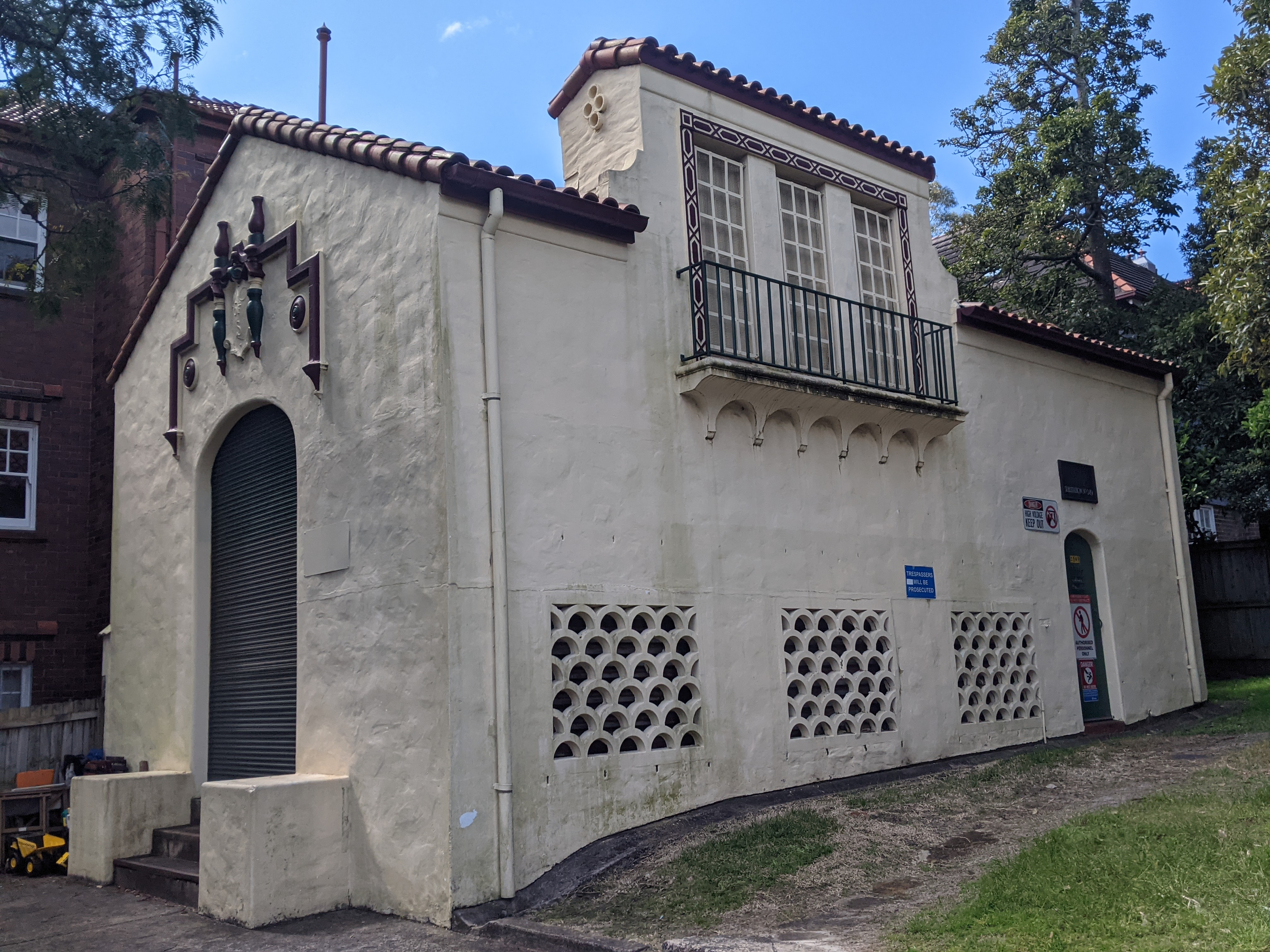
- Electricity Substation No. 349

- Location within Sydney Location within Australia
- 33°54′37″S 151°14′12″E
- Location: 2S Frances Street, Randwick, New South Wales, Australia

History
- Built: 1930

Site notes
- Architects: Walter Frederick White; City Architect's Department; Municipal Council of Sydney
- Architectural style: Interwar Mediterranean
- Owner: Ausgrid

New South Wales Heritage Register
- Official name: Electricity Substation No. 349; #349 Princes Street substation
- Type: state heritage (built)
- Designated: 2 May 2008
- Reference no.: 1792
- Type: Electricity Transformer/Substation
- Category: Utilities – Electricity
- Builders: J Rutherford

The Electricity Substation No. 349 is a heritage-listed electrical substation at 2S Frances Street, Randwick, New South Wales, Australia. It was designed by Walter Frederick White, City Architect's Department and Municipal Council of Sydney and built during 1930 by J Rutherford. It is also known as #349 Princes Street substation. The property is owned by Ausgrid. It was added to the New South Wales State Heritage Register on 2 May 2008.

== History ==
=== Electricity supply ===
Electricity substation No. 349 is a purpose designed and built structure dating from c. 1930, constructed by the Municipal Council of Sydney to supply power to consumers in the Randwick area. From the late 1920s on there was enormous expansion in electricity provision within the Sydney region, driven by the suburban growth of the 1920s and 1930s. Under this impetus, dozens of electricity substations were built annually to service demand.

=== Historical documentation ===
- "Erected by J Rutherford on tender for the Municipal Council of Sydney which was the electricity authority before the Sydney County Council took over in 1935. The Council decided to purchase the land in 1929 from the Railway commissioners (being part of the tramway land) for A£600. The tender for £1,180 by J Rutherford was accepted in September 1930."
- Vol 19:
- 13/8/30 p27 – tenders called for construction
- 27/8/30 p38 tender for substation 349 Prince Street awarded to J Rutherford for £1,180.

=== Electricity provision in Sydney, 1904 to present ===
In 1904, the year in which the first power station in Sydney commenced operations, the Municipal Council of Sydney (MCS) was formed to produce and distribute electric light and power to central Sydney. From 1904 until 1935 the MCS, as both an electricity generation and distribution authority, constructed hundreds of small distribution substations throughout Sydney, many of which are still in service. The MCS supplied electricity to retail customers around the inner city, inner west and lower north shore and provided bulk power to outer western and northern suburbs such as Penrith, Hornsby and Manly.

The MCS initially competed against a number of private electricity supply companies. These were mostly small-scale operations, which the MCS had acquired by 1914. The exception was the Electric Light and Power Supply Corporation (ELPSC), established in 1909, which was the one major private player in the Sydney electricity market until 1955 when it was nationalised by the Electricity Commission of NSW.

In 1935 the functions of the MCS Electricity Department were taken over by the Sydney County Council (SCC) with broad responsibility for electricity supply across the Sydney region. There was rapid expansion in the electricity distribution network with 40-50 substations constructed annually. The scale of SCC's operations consistently made it the largest local authority in Australia throughout the second half of the 20th century.

In 1991 the SCC was reconstituted as Sydney Electricity (a statutory authority). In 1996 Sydney Electricity merged with the Hunter regional electricity authority Orion (formerly Shortland Electricity) and was corporatised as EnergyAustralia.

=== Substation design, 1904 to present ===
Electricity distribution substations were generally built as modest 1 or 2 storey buildings, with Zone Substations considerably larger in scale. The style and nature of substation construction became progressively more standardised as the electricity network expanded. While the earliest substations tended to be large, well-ornamented public buildings, as they became more commonplace, substations became smaller and simpler. This reflected the need for cost-effective construction methods, the reduction in size of electrical equipment and the speed with which substations needed to be constructed to keep pace with demand. While early substations were often purpose-designed and built for a specific location, by the late 1920s the trend was for standardised designs built to a similar size and generally designed to fit on a standard suburban subdivision block, typically 100–200 square metres (1,100–2,200 sq ft).

Designs did keep pace with architectural trends and it is possible to identify a number of different and distinct architectural styles of substations. One-off designed substations did continue to be built well into the mid-20th century thought these tended to be restricted to what the SCC referred to as "high class" suburbs in Sydney's east.

The number of substations constructed in the Sydney region exploded from the late 1920s, with dozens of substations being constructed in any one year to cope with expanding demand. While in the early years of network construction many substations had unique characteristics and were sited in response to a particular need, from the late 1920s standardised designs were generally used and expansion was based on a need to establish and expand the electricity grid rather than in response to localised or site-specific issues. By the 1950s the trend towards architecturally designed and detailed substations was exhausted. From that point on, the freestanding metal kiosk-style substation was progressively introduced, while buildings, where they were constructed, tended towards strictly functional unadorned brick enclosures. Substation design was also influenced by the general changes in Australian building construction in the mid-20th century. The trend towards larger steel and concrete buildings saw "chamber"" style substations incorporated directly within new buildings. In such circumstances the electricity provider had little or no input into the architectural style of the substation chamber, merely supplying technical requirements which influenced the location and size of the substation within the new building. This trend also saw smaller older-style substations demolished in some areas and replaced with new chamber substations incorporated into a new development. This style of construction is commonplace today, particularly in high density urban areas.

EnergyAustralia's older substations range from very finely detailed to very plain and functional.

The early government-run electrical authorities were aware of the need to make substations in residential areas attractive and in keeping with the surroundings, and an architect joined the substation design area of Sydney County Council in 1936. By contrast, the modern trend is to make substations essentially invisible, through incorporating them into larger buildings, placing them wholly underground or within anonymous small steel boxes which tend to be ignored in urban environments. The exception to this continues to be the zone substations and high voltage switchyards, which continue to require large buildings or areas of land to house equipment.

Historically, better quality buildings tended to be reserved for what the MCS referred to as "high class" suburbs (particularly Woollahra and Mosman) while middle- and working-class suburbs generally received much simpler, functional buildings. Designs tended to be reused, sometimes with only minimal variation. There are also marked stylistic differences between substations constructed by government as opposed to those constructed by the Electric Light and Power Supply Corporation (ELPSC) throughout the first half of the 20th century. The ELPSC substations tend to be functionalist brick boxes with only the slightest degree of architectural detailing or ornamentation, whereas the substations constructed by municipalities, while often reusing the same underlying design with minor variation, tend to be more finely detailed and in many instances are designed to match the architecture of the surrounding area. This may reflect the different nature of the competing priorities of a private as opposed to a government enterprise. A number of former ELPSC structures exist within the EnergyAustralia network.

== Description ==
Electricity Substation No. 349 is an Interwar Mediterranean style building with an element of Spanish Mission style. It is a single gable roofed building with a symmetrical gable wall which has a single large arched doorway surmounted by an elaborate plaster ornament. One side wall has a personnel door and a raised gable roofed ventilation turret with simulated windows, balcony and ornamental ironwork, and decorative arch motifs forming the supporting brackets. The ventilation panels are formed by curved concrete or ceramic blocks set into what are window spaces for metal louvres in other similar designs. The substation is constructed in load-bearing brick and finished with a smooth layer of stucco. The roof is curved ceramic tile. Curved ceramic or concrete blocks form ventilation panels in the side walls.

=== Condition ===
As at 18 October 2007, the condition of the building was generally good. Downpipes discharge to ground. The exterior is architecturally intact. Internal equipment has been completely altered.

=== Modifications and dates ===
Gutters and downpipes replaced. Modern chain wire fences.

== Heritage listing ==
As at 25 October 2007, Electricity Substation No 349, Randwick, is significant at state level as an aesthetically distinctive, finely detailed, unusually large, and highly intact example of an Interwar Mediterranean style substation with elements of Spanish Mission style.

The substation was designed by the City Architect's Office of the Municipal Council of Sydney and built c. 1930 to distribute power to consumers in response to the strong residential growth in the surrounding suburbs in the 1920s and 1930s.

It is a fine example of the high standard of work of the City Architect's Office of the Sydney Municipal Council, which was conscious of the need to erect substations suitable to the urban environment of the time. It demonstrates the Council's express policy of constructing finely designed buildings in areas it considered to be "high class" suburbs and is testament to the past creative endeavour of electricity providers in applying architectural values to utilitarian structures.

It is the largest and most intact of this style of distribution substation and remains in service for its original purpose.

Electricity Substation No. 349 was listed on the New South Wales State Heritage Register on 2 May 2008 having satisfied the following criteria.

The place is important in demonstrating the course, or pattern, of cultural or natural history in New South Wales.

Electricity Substation No. 349, Randwick, is significant at the local level both for its association with a significant historical phase, in the major expansion of electricity provision to Sydney's rapidly developing eastern suburbs in the 1920s and 1930s, and in demonstrating the continuity of historical activity in the provision of electricity. Substation No. 349, Randwick is historically important as a component of the electricity distribution network which delivered electrical power to consumers in Sydney's rapidly developing eastern suburbs. As at 2007, the substation continued to serve its original function within Sydney's electricity network.

The place has a strong or special association with a person, or group of persons, of importance of cultural or natural history of New South Wales's history.

Electricity substation No. 349, Randwick is significant at state level for its association with the work of Walter Frederick White (ARIA), City Architect's Office, Municipal Council of Sydney and its successor organisation, Sydney County Council, where White worked between c. 1924 and c. 1947. It is the best known example to date (2007) of White's design for electrical substations. White is known to have been responsible for the substantial and sympathetic 1929 extensions to the Interwar Art Nouveau/Art Deco styled Auburn Zone Substation No. 167 and for the design of the Waverley Zone Substation No. 269, Bondi (1928) which is also in the Interwar Mediterranean/Spanish Mission styles and is the largest substation (and only zone substation) to be designed in this style. Further research should reveal additional surviving substations built by the Municipal Council of Sydney and Sydney County Council that can be attributed to W. F. White.

The place is important in demonstrating aesthetic characteristics and/or a high degree of creative or technical achievement in New South Wales.

Electricity substation No. 349, Randwick, is significant at state level as an aesthetically distinctive, unusually large, unusually well detailed and rare example of a purpose-designed and built Interwar Mediterranean/Spanish Mission style substation. The substation is a fine example of the high standard of work of the City Architect's Office of the Sydney Municipal Council, which was conscious of the need to erect substations suitable to the urban environment of the time. It demonstrates the Council's express policy of constructing finely designed buildings in areas it considered to be "high class" suburbs and is testament to the past creative endeavour of electricity providers in applying architectural values to utilitarian structures. It is similar in design to the larger, less detailed Waverley Zone Substation No. 269, Bondi. Both substations were designed by the WF White, City Architect's Office, Municipal Council of Sydney in the Mediterranean/Spanish Mission style. Electricity Substation No. 349, Randwick, is the most intact of the Spanish Mission styled substations in Sydney.

The place has a strong or special association with a particular community or cultural group in New South Wales for social, cultural or spiritual reasons.

The site does not meet this criterion.

The place has potential to yield information that will contribute to an understanding of the cultural or natural history of New South Wales.

The site does not meet this criterion. Internal equipment has been completely altered over the life of the building.

The place possesses uncommon, rare or endangered aspects of the cultural or natural history of New South Wales.

Electricity Substation No. 349, Randwick, is significant at state level as the only distribution substation built in the Interwar Mediterranean/Spanish Mission styles with such a fine level of detail that also remains intact, in original condition, and retains all of its architectural detail (which is often missing on substations from this period). Electricity Substation No. 349, Randwick, shares stylistic similarities with the following four distribution substations (all in Sydney's eastern suburbs) that were built by the Municipal Council of Sydney (MCS) or Sydney County Council (SCC) between 1929 and 1939:

- No. 300, Clovelly (c. 1929, Interwar Spanish Mission, MCS)
- No. 314, Vaucluse (1930, Interwar Mediterranean, MCS)
- No. 364, Bellevue Hill (1931, Interwar Mediterranean, MCS)
- No. 592, Watsons Bay (1939, Interwar Mediterranean, SCC).

These four substations are assessed on EnergyAustralia's section 170 Heritage and Conservation Register 2007 as being significant at the local level. They are all smaller, less detailed and less intact structures than Electricity Substation No. 349, Randwick.

The place is important in demonstrating the principal characteristics of a class of cultural or natural places/environments in New South Wales.

Electricity Substation No. 349, Randwick, is significant at state level as typical, in terms of function, within the electricity network. It is, however, unusually large and well detailed for a distribution substation.

== See also ==
- Australian non-residential architectural styles
- Ausgrid
