= Edward Hope Kirkby =

Australian jeweler (1853–1915)

Edward Hope Kirkby (31 December 1853 – 28 July 1915) was a jeweler watchmaker in Williamstown, Victoria who eventually became a manufacturing electrician making systems of fire protection. He is best known for his early X-ray experiments and later wireless experiments, among the earliest in Australia first reported at Footscray in 1899. He experimented on his own account and George Augustine Taylor always used Kirkby, and the wireless made by him, in his lectures. There are no primary references to George Taylor experimenting with wireless telegraphy himself. Kirkby was the technical genius behind Father Archibald Shaw and his Australasian Wireless ventures.

== Early life and family ==
Kirkby was born on 31 December 1853 aboard the ship Hope, en route to Melbourne, Victoria. His family settled in Sandhurst (now Bendigo), where his father ran a soft drink business. Kirkby trained as a jeweller and watchmaker and later studied electricity and magnetism at the Bendigo School of Mines.

He married Jane Gill in Melbourne, and they lived in Sandhurst before moving to Williamstown around 1882, where he opened a shop and had four sons. In 1888, he patented a timekeeping system for football matches, followed by an 1893 patent for a street fire alarm system adopted by the Melbourne Fire Brigade.

In 1901, he moved to Melbourne's city centre to manufacture fire protection systems and X-ray equipment, and later pursued wireless telegraphy. By 1907, he relocated to Sydney, where he continued his work in fire protection and medical apparatus.

After a dispute with business partners, Kirkby leased a factory in Randwick through a Catholic order and produced fire systems and wireless equipment. He died of a heart attack on 28 July 1915, two days after his wife's death. They are buried at Waverley Cemetery.

== Professional career ==
Edward Hope Kirkby was a jeweler watchmaker in Williamstown who eventually became a manufacturing electrician making systems of fire protection, in 1908 he invented and patented the first automatic sprinkler alarm.

=== X-ray experiments ===
He is first recorded as experimenting with X-ray in September 1896 This is only 9 months after Roentgen presented his discovery of X-rays. He is reported as experimenting with the medical staff at Williamstown Hospital later that year In 1900 Dr Clenndinnen was party to demonstrating X-ray at Bendigo School of Mines using a Kirkby manufactured X-ray coil, said by him that it was an excellent one. Kirkby eventually moved to Sydney in 1907 where he set up business manufacturing wireless, X-ray and other medical apparatus and consulting with the medical profession

=== Wireless experiments ===
He was first recorded practically demonstrating wireless telegraphy along with X-ray in 1899

He was demonstrating experiments in X-ray and wireless at the Federal Exhibition and Palace of Amusements in 1903

In early 1905, the use of wireless telegraphy in Europe had increased to the extent that there was much concern by the British Admiralty about mutual interference between neighbouring operators, particularly nearby ships using different transmission systems. This concern was reflected in Australia. The Australian Postmaster-General's Department was not considered a reliable source for comment and an Australian reporter chose to interview Kirkby an expert on the subject. Kirkby correctly identified syntony (as it was then known) or frequency selective transmission and reception as the technological solution to the problem.

Again in January 1905, the highly mobile Kirkby he conducted a demonstration of wireless perhaps better attributed to quackery rather than wireless experimentation, where "on the occasion of the installation of a high frequency electrical apparatus at Elsinore, Glebe Road, Glebe Point. In the darkened room, Mr. Kirkby, who erected the apparatus to the order of Mrs. Clark, showed the visitors the wonders of the high frequency system by which the electric fluid permeates the whole body appearing in jets at all points from the head to the toe of the boot. With all its force the current can be applied to infants, and its curative agency is now established among leading physicians." However later he did undertake some more traditional wireless experiments and we hear no more of such unfortunate diversions.

Kirkby continued to lecture and demonstrate wireless telegraphy and X-rays. In February 1905, at a meeting of the Accountants and Clerks' Association in Melbourne, it was reported: "After the completion of other routine business, Mr. E. H. Kirkby, electrician, was introduced, and delivered a lecture on Some of the Latest Phases of Electrical Science, illustrated by experiments, which included wireless telegraphy, X-rays and other wonders of this science, which were highly appreciated by all present. A vote of thanks to the lecturer concluded the meeting."

In a visit to Adelaide, South Australia in August 1907, a city which was otherwise dormant to wireless telegraphy following the passing of the Wireless Telegraphy Act 1905, Kirkby is reported demonstrating the technology to a local reporter: "At the U.S.A. depot, Gawler-place, yesterday, a representative of "The Advertiser" was shown a complete model of the wireless telegraphic apparatus by the manager, Mr. H. E. Kirby (sic). The instrument is of a kind used on the large Liverpool American mailboats. It consists of a transmitter, and a receiver, fitted with all the necessary parts, including the tapping key, batteries, spark-inductor, coherer, relay electric bell, connecting peg, batteries, connector for Morse writing apparatus, and air wire. The machine works accurately at a distance of 17 to 20 yards, and with more powerful batteries would doubtless transmit messages to a greater distance. Mr. Kirby first of all started the bell ringing on the receiver when the two parts were in the same room, but to demonstrate the principle more fully he carried the receiver into the next shop, a thick wall dividing the rooms, and then operated again, the bell responding to every touch upon the tapping key.

Kirkby participated as an operator of one of the two wireless stations established by Australian land military forces at their annual Easter encampment. With his equipment manufactured by Kirkby. The experiment was widely reported (with apologies for the language of the day): "The present Heathcote camp may be an historical one, since it has witnessed the first recorded successful use of a wireless telegraph installation in the Commonwealth under military conditions. The recent formation of the Wireless Institute enabled Lieut. G. A. Taylor, A.I.C., to make the arrangements in conjunction with Captain Cox-Taylor, of the Garrison Artillery, who watched the experiment closely, and interestedly with a view to the possible future military development of wireless telegraphy in the Commonwealth. Conditions which would most probably be met with on active service were scrupulously observed by those in charge of the operating stations; indeed, in the determination to impart the utmost realism to the undertaking discomforts innumerable were cheerfully faced by the corps. The surrounding district was depended upon for the supply of most of the paraphernalia. For the masts to support the aerials three saplings were lashed together in each instance, giving an altitude of some 50 or 60 feet. The aerial wires at A station were conveyed to a military tent where the operating appliances were installed, and at station B, to a cave under the crest of the hill beneath the line of targets, some four miles to the south-west. The latter position was of very great interest, inasmuch as on the rocks flanking the cave some queer aboriginal carvings and a deep V cut in a sandstone, used evidently by ancient black warriors to sharpen their implements of war, were discovered. A coincidence was actually established between the ancient, barbarous, warlike messages and the most modern means of communication between fighting forces. The outlying station was in charge of Mr. Reginald Wilkinson, and at the main station Mr. Kirkby operated, while the enthusiastic hon. secretary, of the Wireless Institute, Mr. W. H. Hannam, supervised the apparatus. Considerable time was spent in getting connection between the stations, and the call letter V was continually flashing throughout Saturday and Sunday, until it was at last picked up by the head station, in the small hours of Monday morning. Tuning being now consonant, signals were continually exchanged. The University Scouts took deep interest in these experiments, and lent valuable assistance."

Still promoting the patriotic benefits of wireless, in July 1910, Kirkby and Taylor lectured and demonstrated wireless at a meeting of the United Service Institution in Sydney: "Some very interesting experiments were shown last evening by Lieutenant G. A. Taylor and Mr. Kirkby, whose apparatus was commended by Dr. Bell as the equal of any in the world. At the conclusion of a lecture by the former a button was pressed, and by means of wireless a flag was run up, a breeze set blowing, a gun fired, and a gramophone played God Save the King." The lecture was so well received that Taylor and Kirkby responded with a repeat of the lecture and demonstration at King's Hall, Phillip St, Sydney on 31 August 1910, with proceeds going to the Sydney Hospital radium fund.

Taylor only lectured, Kirkby manufactured the equipment and demonstrated it, Taylor was the publisher of the magazine Construction for the Master Builders Association. The only reference to Taylor's wireless experimentation without any citations or references was by his biographer Giles in 1954. This may have kept Florence, Taylor's wife, happy as she had commissioned the article that appeared as a supplement to the magazine.

=== Father Shaw and Australian Wireless Co ===
Wormalds Bros manufacturers of fire protection equipment were getting rich at his expense. and he dissolved his partnership with them. He was looking for a place to manufacture his apparatus. He was friends with a Catholic priest Father Archibald Shaw MSC. He and his superior, Father Guis, built a factory for Kirkby on their land at the procure where Kirkby began manufacturing his fire systems of fire protection. The procure was always short of money, and Shaw asked Kirkby to make wireless for him. He did and they became very successful. Kirkby formed a company, the Maritime Wireless Telegraph Company of Australasia, he was the majority shareholder. Shaw had no pecuniary interests and was nominated as the figurehead president.

== Artifacts ==
- Museums Victoria Telegram from Jenvey to Chambers, advising major improvement in signals, 1900 Museums Victoria

== Publications ==
- Jenvey, H. W. Practical telegraphy : a guide for the use of officers of the Victorian Post and Telegraph Department. vol. 1 (2nd edition Melbourne, 1891) Trove
