= NSW School of Languages =

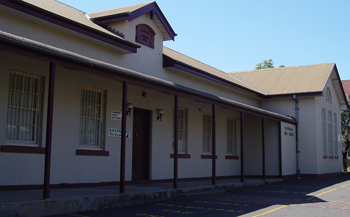
- Former main building

Location
- 35 West Street, Petersham; Inner Western Sydney, New South Wales; Australia; 33°53′42″S 151°09′03″E

Information
- Former name: New South Wales Correspondence School; Open High School
- Type: Public
- Motto: Learn Locally. Communicate Globally
- Established: 1991; 35 years ago (as New South Wales Correspondence School)
- Specialist: Languages
- Principal: Teresa Naso
- Enrolment: 2,416 (2021)
- Campus: Suburban
- Colours: Blue and white
- Website: nswschoollang.schools.nsw.gov.au

NSW School of Languages (previously the Open High School) is a public specialist coeducation secondary school, with speciality in teaching languages via distance education, located in West Street, Petersham, an inner-western suburb of Sydney, New South Wales, Australia.

The school is operated by the New South Wales Department of Education.

== History ==
In 1991, the New South Wales Correspondence School, which catered for preschool to Year 12 students, was decentralised into 19 distance education centres located in schools across the state. At this time the Learning Materials Production Centre was formed to produce learning materials for all these centres and Open High School was established to teach languages by distance to students across the state. In 2017, Open High School changed its name to NSW School of Languages.

The school was previously located in the grounds of the former Randwick North High School. In 2018, NSW School of Languages moved to its current and permanent location in Petersham, in the grounds of the former Petersham Girls High School.

== Enrolment ==
Enrolment is available to students in years 9–12 currently enrolled in secondary or central schools, both government and non-government, located in New South Wales or approved Australian Capital Territory or Papua New Guinea secondary or central schools.

The main purposes of the school are to assist students to extend their curriculum options and maintain continuity of study, e.g. when transferring between schools.

To enrol, students must satisfy published enrolment criteria. The maximum enrolments from schools are determined by a quota system; e.g. a school with 600 students is allowed up to six new distance education enrolments each year.

Currently courses are offered in Chinese, French, German, Indonesian, Italian, Japanese, Korean, Latin, Modern Greek, Portuguese, Russian, and Spanish.

NSW School of Languages operates in a distance education mode. Teachers provide students with rich and engaging learning experiences which are designed to meet their individual needs. Some of the strategies employed involve the use of:

- an online LMS (Canvas and Moodle)
- printed materials
- CD/DVD materials
- online lessons
- face-to-face individual and group lessons
- computer-assisted communication

== Achievements ==
NSW School of Languages has a history of high achievement by students sitting HSC examinations. NSW School of Languages students often top the state in their HSC language courses.

== See also ==
- List of government schools in New South Wales
- Education in Australia
