= Randwick Public School =

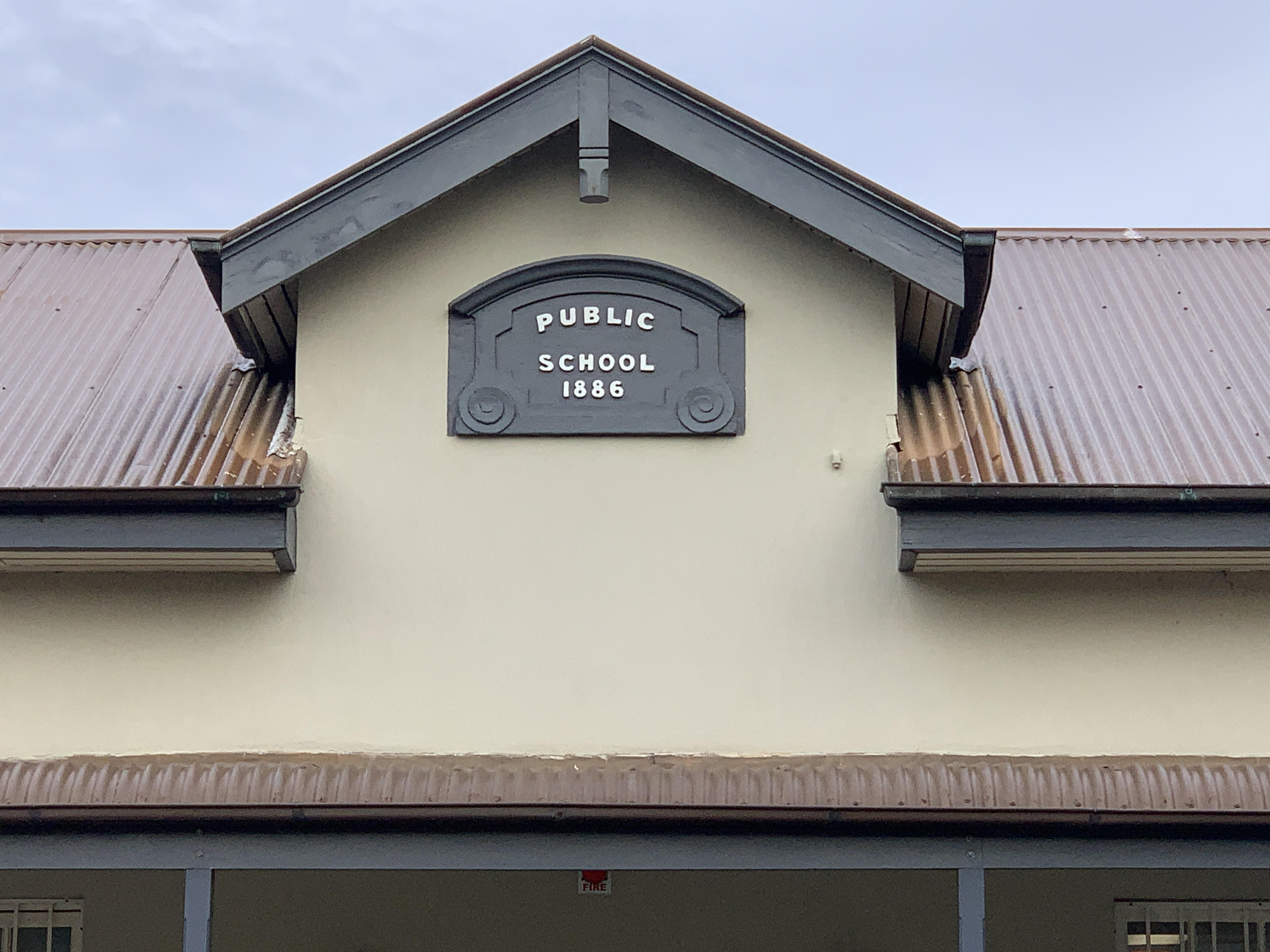
- Front of Randwick PS

Location
- 78 Avoca St; Randwick, New South Wales, 2031; Australia; 33°54′36″S 151°14′35″E

Information
- Type: Public Primary school day school
- Mottoes: Endeavour
- Established: 1883 (public school)
- Principal: Tiona Raad
- Years offered: Kindergarten to 6
- Gender: Coeducational
- Enrolment: >1000 (K–6)
- Campus: Cowper Street
- Colours: Black and gold
- Website: randwick-p.schools.nsw.gov.au

Randwick Public School is a comprehensive public school located in Randwick, New South Wales, Australia operated by the New South Wales Department of Education. It goes from Kindergarten to Year 6. There are over 1000 students enrolled. It offers standard curriculum alongside music, sport, religion/ethics classes and after school care.

== Location ==
The school is located just north of central Randwick and takes up most of the space between Avoca St, Cowper St, Frances St and The Avenue. Other buildings in this block include the Randwick Town Hall & City Council buildings, the local Fire Station and Bowling Club.

Just to the South (over Frances St) is the St Jude's Church and Cemetery. The church is famous for being the source of the "Randwick Bells" in the song by Paul Kelly. The children at school can hear the Randwick Bells chime during their days at school.

== Indigenous Culture ==
The school is located on the traditional lands of the Cadigal people. It is an important part of pupil education to teach students about the traditional culture of the original inhabitants and owners of the grounds of the school. A new sport uniform was created in 2021 which features Indigenous design that students wear in inter- or intra-school sport that celebrates the art of Indigenous people.

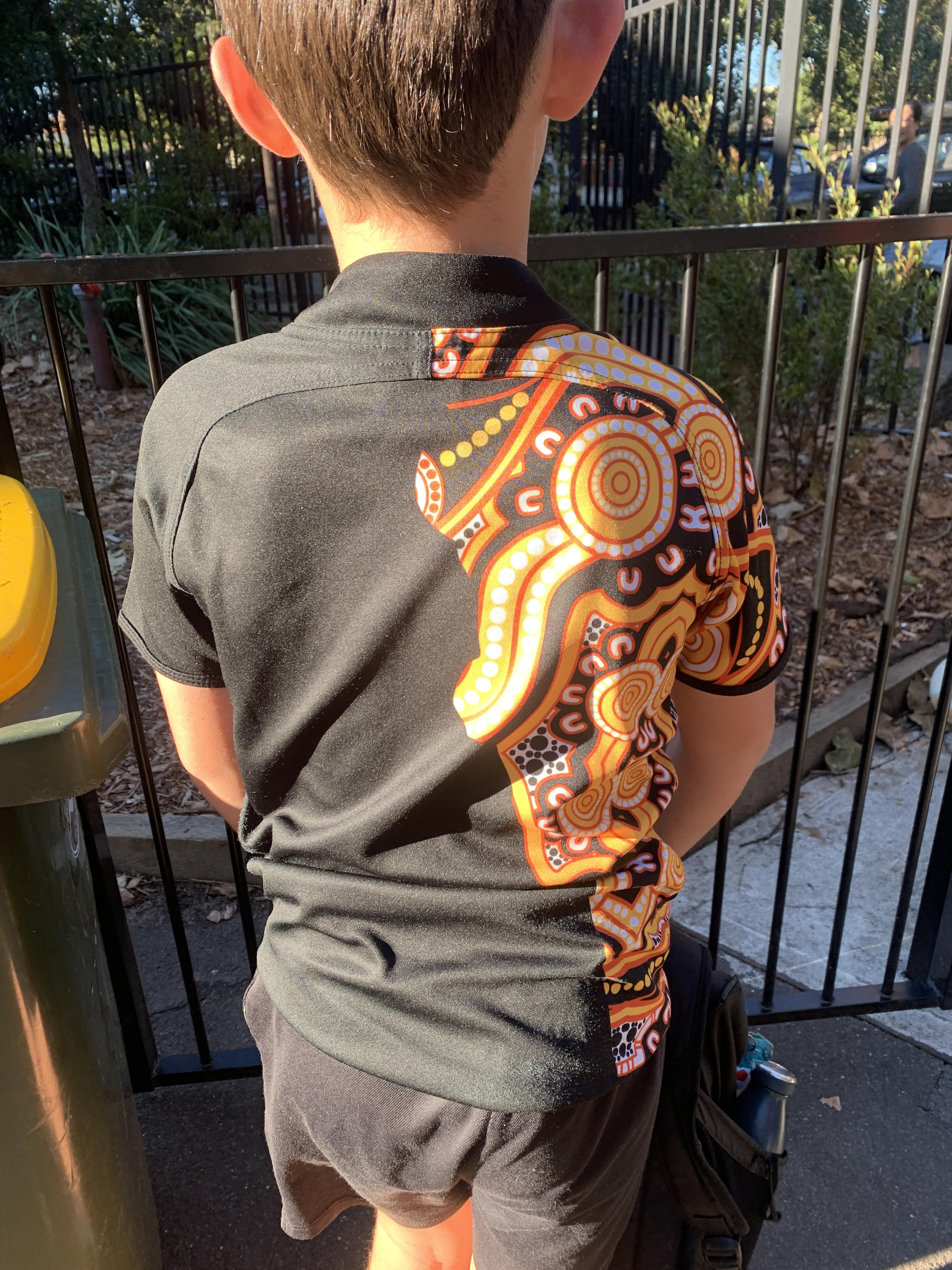
Randwick PS sports uniform

== History ==
The school was originally established in 1883, one of 228 State Schools established as a consequence of the Public Instruction Act of 1880. The Act was to make education free, compulsory and secular.

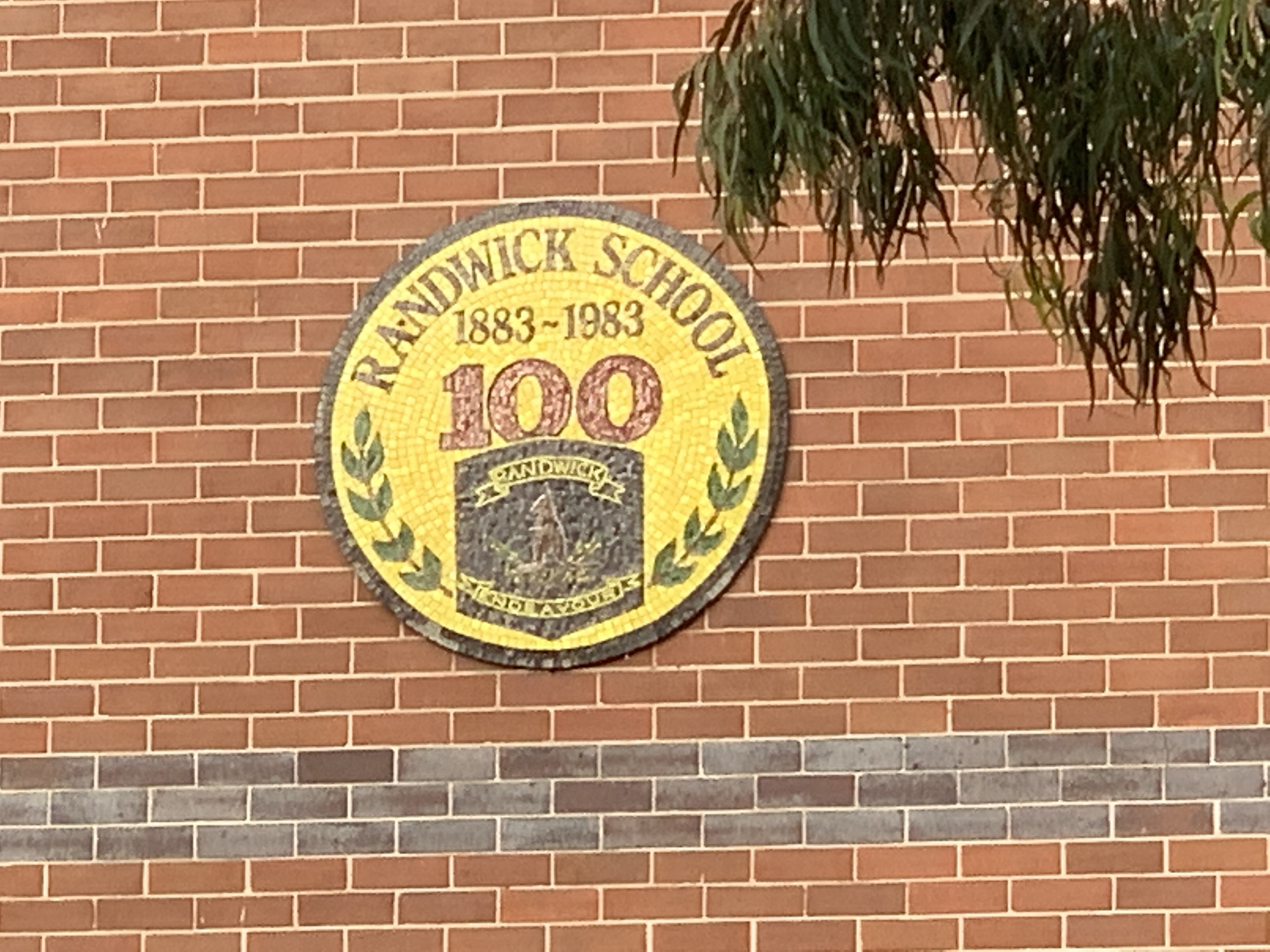
The 100 year anniversary of Randwick Public School was celebrated in 1983

The nucleus of the School grew from an established church school, St. Judes, Randwick, and the buildings were completed in 1887. In 1913, the School became a "Superior" Public School, catering for older students, but returned to being a primary school in 1959.

=== Sydney trams ===
The current school grounds on the Western side encompass land which was previously part of the old Sydney Tram Network. The Cross Country Line (Bondi Junction to Coogee, route 19) travelled down Frenchmans Rd and Cowper St and turned south through a route which is now part of the Randwick Public School cricket nets and the "Forest" to meet Frances St and then Cook St. A double row of trees in the Forest part of the current playground shows the previous route of the tram line.

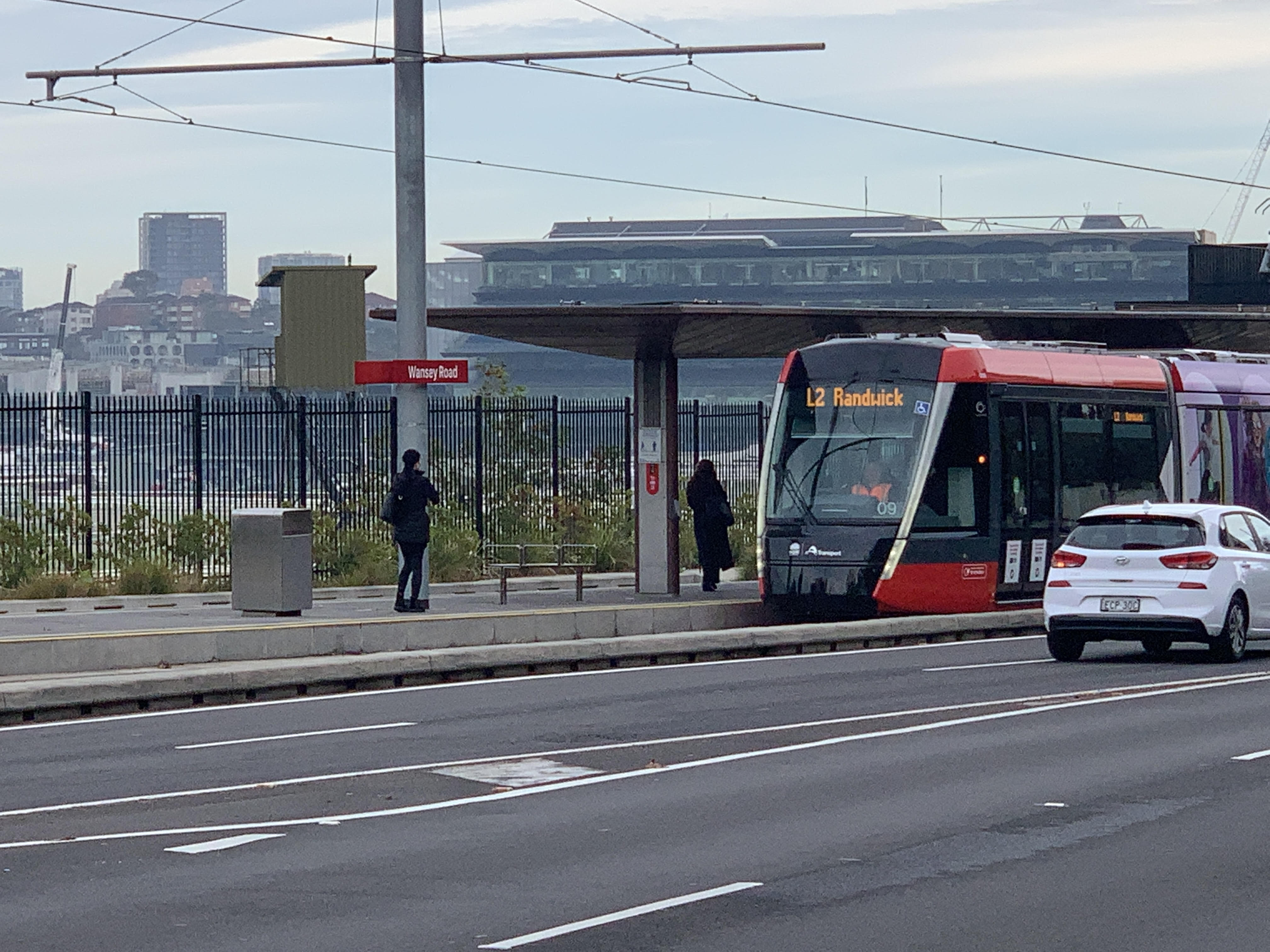
Wansey Road light rail stop

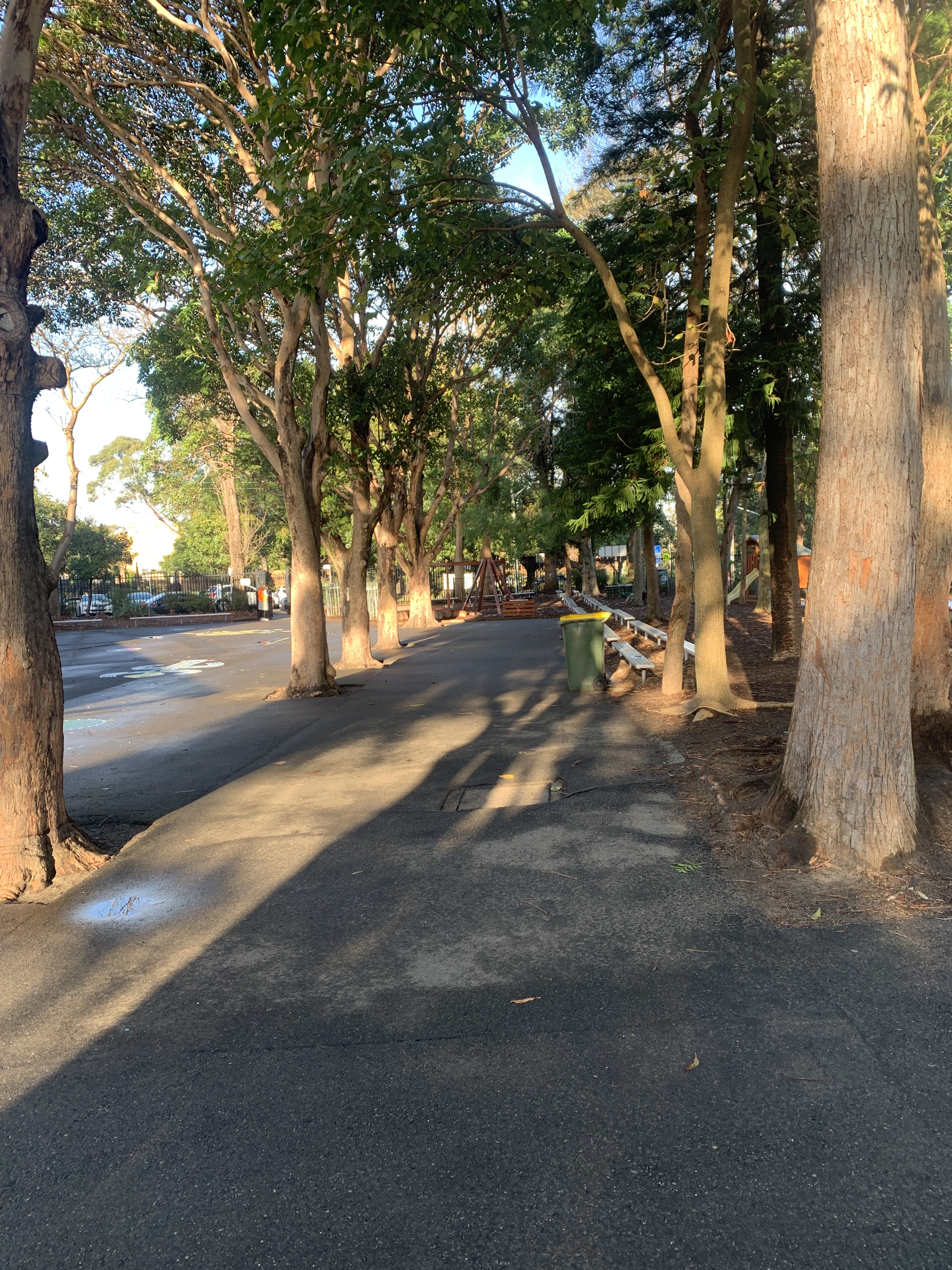
Previous route of the old Sydney no 19 tram, through current grounds of Randwick Public School

The new L2 Sydney Light Rail line (opened December 2019) now also reaches Randwick. The closest stop to Randwick Public School is Wansey Rd, on the corner of Alison Rd, about 400m from the school.

=== Upgrades in 2018–19 ===
In 2015 it was announced that Randwick Public School would receive a major funding increase to cater for school expansion in all of catchment area, size of the school and expanse of the grounds. It was announced that the nearby Open High School would be demolished and the grounds would be taken over by the footprint of Randwick Public School.

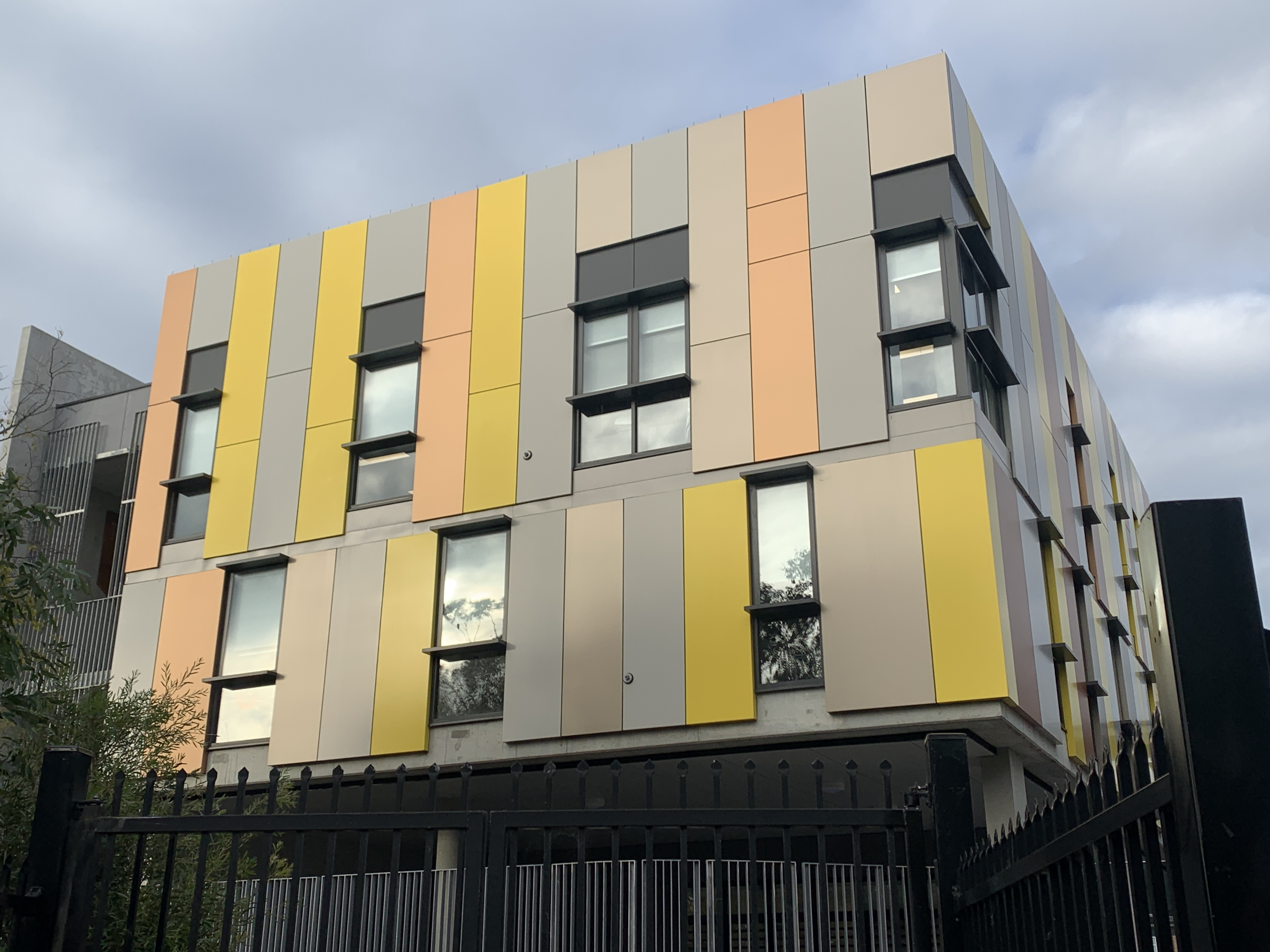
The Beehive building, completed 2019

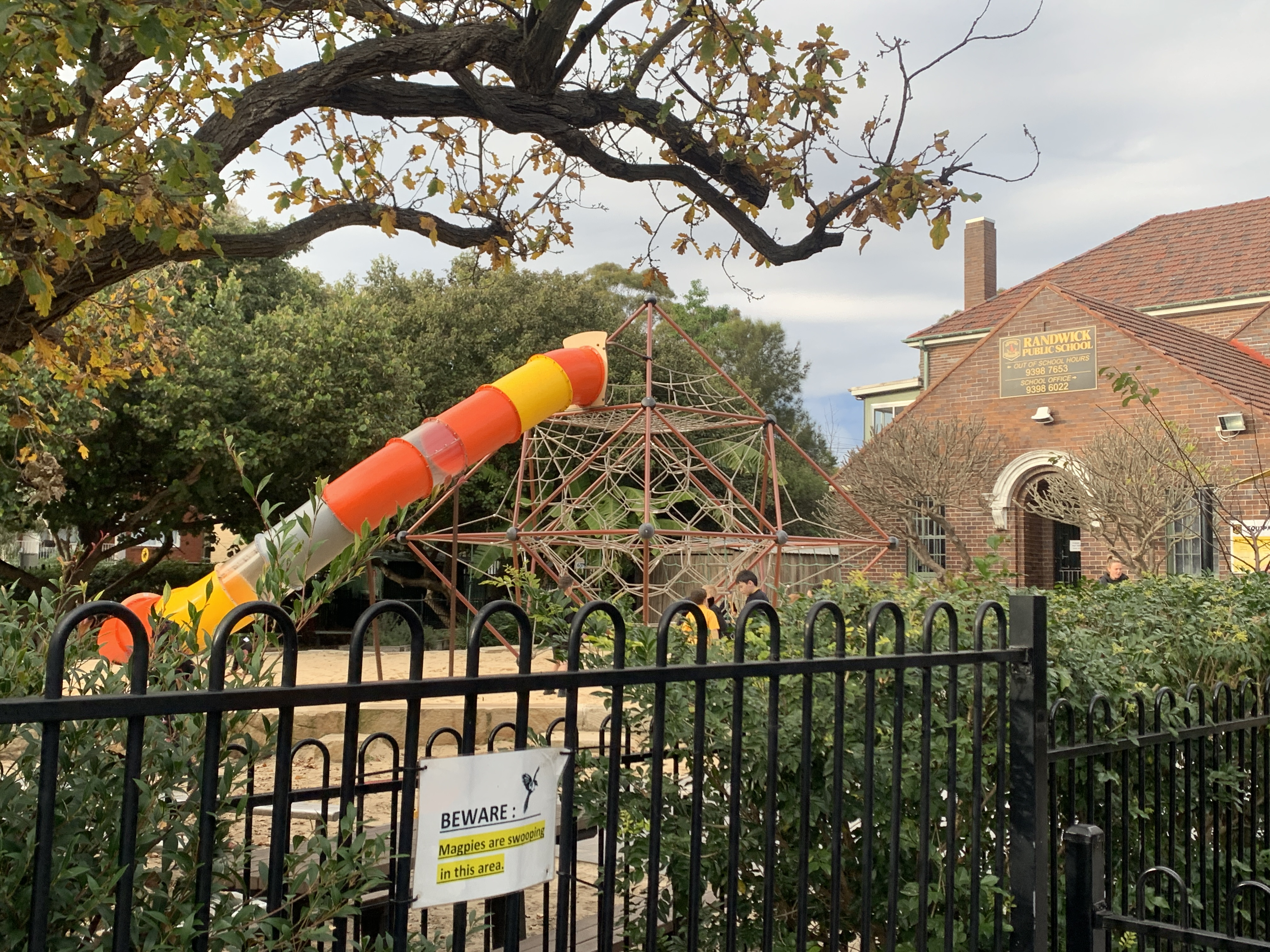
2019 new playground area for after school care

The works were completed in April 2019, with the new feature classroom building dubbed "The Beehive".

=== Recent history ===
Randwick Public School was visited by the NSW Premier Dominic Perrottet on 6 December 2021, when he was campaigning for reform in the Education System.
