= Randwick (disambiguation) =

Randwick is a suburb in Sydney.

Randwick may also refer to:

== Australia ==
- City of Randwick, a local-government area in Sydney
- Randwick Racecourse
- Randwick DRUFC, a rugby-union club in Randwick, New South Wales

== New Zealand ==
- Randwick Kingfishers, a rugby-league club based in Lower Hutt

== United Kingdom ==
- Randwick, Gloucestershire, a village
