= Sandgate, Randwick =

Sandgate
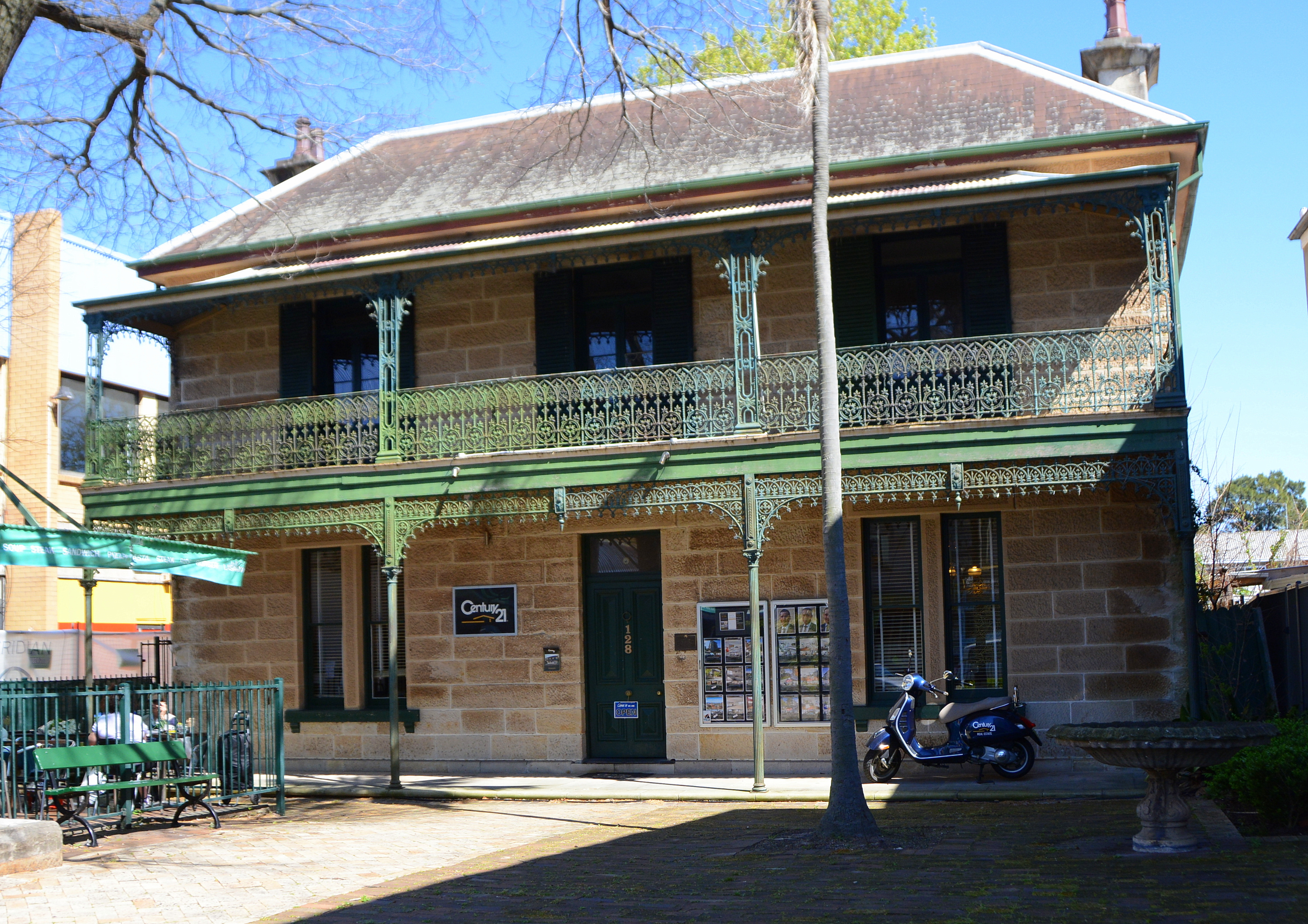
- Sandgate, pictured in 2016.

- Location within Sydney Location within Australia
- 33°54′58″S 151°14′25″E
- Location: 128 Belmore Road, Randwick, City of Randwick, New South Wales, Australia

History
- Built: 1879

Site notes
- Architectural style: Victorian Filigree
- Owner: Randwick City Council

New South Wales Heritage Register
- Official name: Sandgate; Kilkerran; Felton
- Type: State heritage (built)
- Designated: 2 April 1999
- Reference no.: 67
- Type: House
- Category: Residential buildings (private)
- Builders: Simeon Pearce

Sandgate is a heritage-listed former residence, repatriation hospital and heritage centre at 128 Belmore Road, Randwick, City of Randwick, New South Wales, Australia. It was built during 1879 by Simeon Pearce. It is also known as Kilkerran and Felton. The property is owned by Randwick City Council. It was added to the New South Wales State Heritage Register on 2 April 1999.

== History ==
=== Indigenous history ===
Pre-1780s, the local Aboriginal people in the area used the site for fishing and cultural activities; rock engravings, grinding grooves and middens remain in evidence. In 1789 the Governor Arthur Phillip referred to "a long bay", which became known as Long Bay. Aboriginal people are believed to have inhabited the Sydney region for at least 20,000 years. The population of Aboriginal people between Palm Beach and Botany Bay in 1788 has been estimated to have been 1500. Those living south of Port Jackson to Botany Bay were the Cadigal people who spoke Dharug, while the local clan name of Maroubra people was "Muru-ora-dial" (City of Sydney webpage, 2003). By the mid nineteenth century the traditional owners of this land had typically either moved inland in search of food and shelter, or had died as the result of European disease or confrontation with British colonisers.

=== Colonial history ===
One of the earliest land grants in this area was made in 1824 to Captain Francis Marsh, who received 12 acres bounded by the present Botany and High Streets, Alison and Belmore Roads. In 1839 William Newcombe acquired the land north-west of the present town hall in Avoca Street.

Randwick takes its name from the town of Randwick, Gloucestershire, England. The name was suggested by Simeon Pearce (1821–86) and his brother James. Simeon was born in the English Randwick and the brothers were responsible for the early development of both Randwick and its neighbour, Coogee. Simeon had come to the colony in 1841as a 21-year-old surveyor. He built his Blenheim House on the 1.6 hectares (4 acres) he bought from Marsh, and called his property "Randwick". The brothers bought and sold land profitably in the area and elsewhere. Simeon campaigned for construction of a road from the city to Coogee (achieved in 1853) and promoted the incorporation of the suburb. Pearce sought construction of a church modelled on the church of St. John in his birthplace. In 1857 the first St Jude's stood on the site of the present post office, at the corner of the present Alison Road and Avoca Street.

Randwick was...slow to progress. The village was isolated from Sydney by swamps and sandhills, and although a horse-drawn omnibus was operated by a man named Grice from the late 1850s, the journey was more a test of nerves than a pleasure jaunt. Wind blew sand over the track, and the bus sometimes became bogged, so that passengers had to get out and push it free. From its early days Randwick had a divided society. The wealthy lived elegantly in large houses built when Pearce promoted Randwick and Coogee as a fashionable area. But the market gardens, orchards and piggeries that continued alongside the large estates were the lot of the working class. Even on the later estates that became racing empires, many jockeys and stablehands lived in huts or even under canvas. An even poorer group were the immigrants who existed on the periphery of Randwick in a place called Irishtown, in the area now known as The Spot, around the junction of St.Paul's Street and Perouse Road. Here families lived in makeshift houses, taking on the most menial tasks in their struggle to survive.

In 1858 when the NSW Government passed the Municipalities Act, enabling formation of municipal districts empowered to collect rates and borrow money to improve their suburb, Randwick was the first suburb to apply for the status of a municipality. It was approved in February 1859, and its first Council was elected in March 1859.

Randwick had been the venue for sporting events, as well as duels and illegal sports, from the early days in the colony's history. Its first racecourse, the Sandy Racecourse or Old Sand Track, had been a hazardous track over hills and gullies since 1860. When a move was made in 1863 by John Tait, to establish Randwick Racecourse, Simeon Pearce was furious, especially when he heard that Tait also intended to move into Byron Lodge. Tait's venture prospered, however and he became the first person in Australia to organise racing as a commercial sport. The racecourse made a big difference to the progress of Randwick. The horse-drawn omnibus gave way to trams that linked the suburb to Sydney and civilisation. Randwick soon became a prosperous and lively place, and it still retains a busy residential, professional and commercial life.

Today, some of the houses have been replaced by home units. Many European migrants have made their homes in the area, along with students and workers at the nearby University of NSW and the Prince of Wales Hospital.

=== Sandgate ===
Sandgate, at 128 Belmore Road, was built around 1870 by Simeon Pearce as part of a row of investment properties along Belmore Road. The first tenant was Edwin T. Penfold, a friend of Pearce.

Simeon Pearce was a prominent Randwick citizen, civil servant and successful land speculator. He was born on 27 January 1821 at Randwick, Gloucestershire, England. He and his cousin Samuel arrived as bounty immigrants in Sydney on Christmas Day 1841 aboard the Lady Clarke. By 1854 he had bought 81 hectares (200 acres) of land at both Manly and French's Forest, and over 81 hectares (200 acres) in parcels around Randwick and the St George area which were subdivided and sold profitably after the promotion of Randwick as a fashionable residential area. He was a leading campaigner for the incorporation of Randwick and was its Mayor in 1859 and held this position a total of six times.

It was known as Kilkerran when occupied by James Cullen, an importer, in 1885 and later by Henry Hinton, wine merchant who lived there from 1886 to 1890. In 1903 Timothy Fahey took up residence and renamed the house 'Felton.' In 1918 it was acquired by the Australian Government and together with the house next door, it became the "Woodville Red Cross Home", a facility for World War I veterans. In 1928 Sandgate passed into the hands of Catherine and Harold Tippler. The Tipplers owned the house until September 1966 when it changed ownership three times within a week.

In the late 1970s ownership of Sandgate was transferred to the developers of the neighbouring Coles New World Supermarket. In October 1978 the Heritage Branch received representations from the Randwick and District Historical Society concerned about proposals to develop a shopping centre on land at the corner of Belmore Road and High Street Randwick. The proposal involved the demolition of Sandgate. As a result, a Section 130 order was placed over Sandgate on 3 November 1978. On 8 November the owner of Sandgate gave notice of its proposed demolition. Negotiations between the owner and the Heritage Branch resulted in an acceptable re-design of the proposed shopping centre that retained the building in situ. An Interim Heritage Order was placed over Sandgate on 15 December 1978. On 13 March 1981 a Permanent Conservation Order was placed over the property. As a condition of consent associated with the development of the neighbouring Randwick Plaza, Sandgate was transferred to Randwick Council in 1982.

During the 1980s the building was restored and in September 1987 the then mayor of Randwick, Ald. John Scullion presented the keys of the cottage to Randwick Historical Society's president Mrs Kate Schlink. It was leased to the Randwick and District Historical Society, becoming its museum and heritage centre from 1987 until 1992 when Randwick Council commenced leasing it to commercial interests.

On 2 April 1999 Sandgate was transferred to the State Heritage Register.

== Description ==
Sandgate is a substantial two storey residence. It retains its original character and detailing including elaborate wrought iron verandahs and columns, ornate plaster cornices and friezes and full cedar joinery.

== Heritage listing ==
As at 8 September 2011, Sandgate constructed c. 1879 is a two-storey sandstone residence. It is associated with Simeon Pearce and the Pearce family who were prominent in the early society and politics of Randwick Municipality. It was designed as a 'Gentleman's residence' and the house retains its original character.

Sandgate was listed on the New South Wales State Heritage Register on 2 April 1999.

== See also ==
- Australian residential architectural styles
