= Venice, Randwick =

Venice
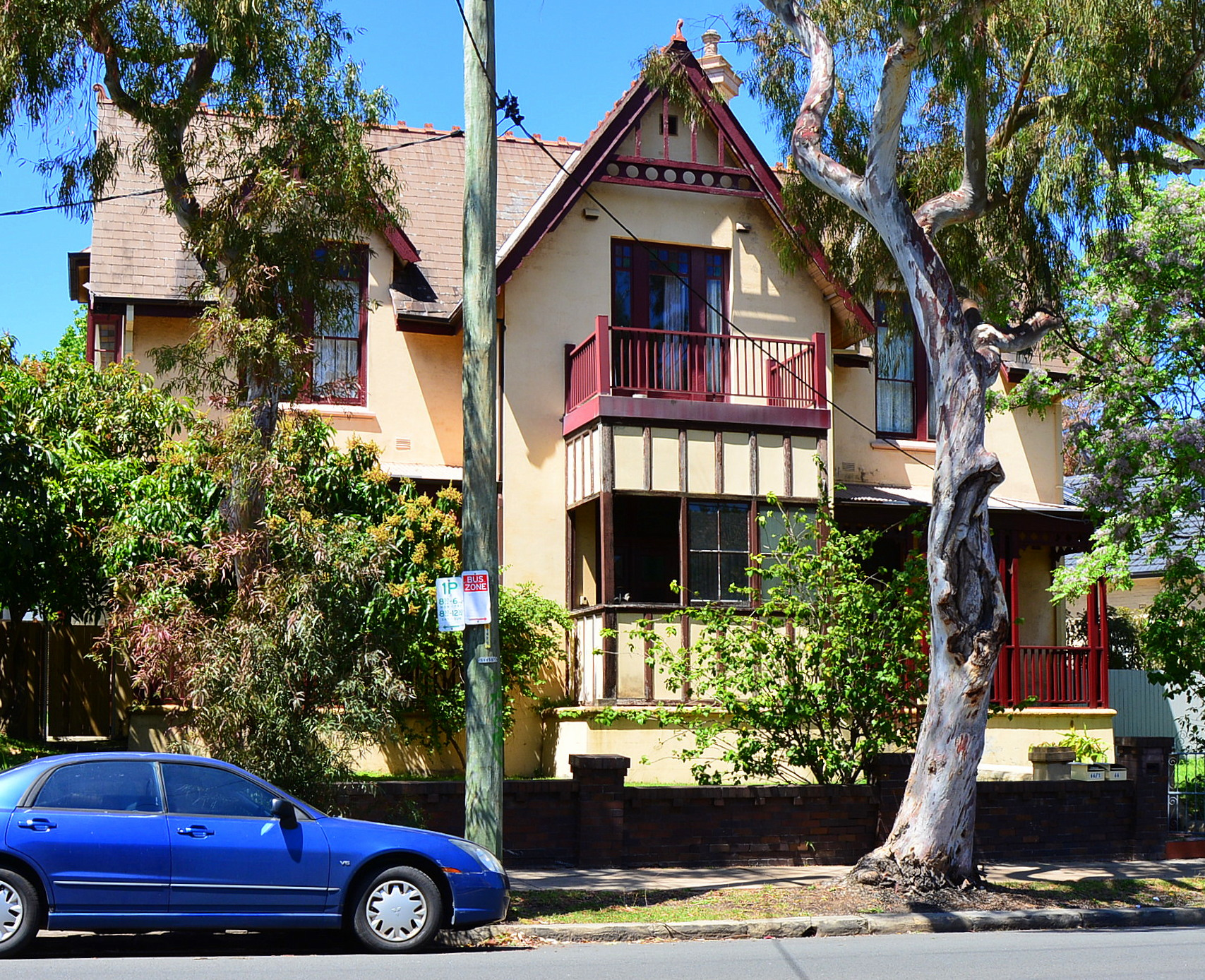
- Venice, Randwick, in October 2014

- Location within Sydney Location within Australia
- 33°54′27″S 151°14′58″E
- Location: 66 Frenchmans Road, Randwick, City of Randwick, New South Wales, Australia

History
- Built: 1884–1885

Site notes
- Architectural style: Gothic Revival

New South Wales Heritage Register
- Official name: Venice
- Type: State heritage (built)
- Designated: 2 April 1999
- Reference no.: 175
- Type: House
- Category: Residential buildings (private)
- Builders: Stephen Gee

Venice is a heritage-listed apartment building and residence in Randwick, City of Randwick, New South Wales, Australia. It was built from 1884 to 1885 by Stephen Gee. It was added to the New South Wales State Heritage Register on 2 April 1999.

== History ==
=== Indigenous history ===
Pre-1780s the local Aboriginal people in the area used the site for fishing and cultural activities; rock engravings, grinding grooves and middens remain in evidence. In 1789 the Governor Arthur Phillip referred to "a long bay", which became known as Long Bay. Aboriginal people are believed to have inhabited the Sydney region for at least 20,000 years. The population of Aboriginal people between Palm Beach and Botany Bay in 1788 has been estimated to have been 1500. Those living south of Port Jackson to Botany Bay were the Cadigal people who spoke Dharug, while the local clan name of Maroubra people was "Muru-ora-dial". By the mid nineteenth century the traditional owners of this land had typically either moved inland in search of food and shelter, or had died as the result of European disease or confrontation with British colonisers.

=== Colonial history ===
One of the earliest land grants in this area was made in 1824 to Captain Francis Marsh, who received 4.9 hectares (12 acres) bounded by the present Botany and High Streets, Alison and Belmore Roads. In 1839 William Newcombe acquired the land north-west of the present town hall in Avoca Street.

Randwick takes its name from the town of Randwick, Gloucestershire, England. The name was suggested by Simeon Pearce (1821–86) and his brother James. Simeon was born in the English Randwick and the brothers were responsible for the early development of both Randwick and its neighbour, Coogee. Simeon had come to the colony in 1841as a 21 year old surveyor. He built his Blenheim House on the 4 acres he bought from Marsh, and called his property "Randwick". The brothers bought and sold land profitably in the area and elsewhere. Simeon campaigned for construction of a road from the city to Coogee (achieved in 1853) and promoted the incorporation of the suburb. Pearce sought construction of a church modelled on the church of St. John in his birthplace. In 1857 the first St Jude's stood on the site of the present post office, at the corner of the present Alison Road and Avoca Street.

Randwick was slow to progress. The village was isolated from Sydney by swamps and sandhills, and although a horse-drawn omnibus was operated by a man named Grice from the late 1850s, the journey was more a test of nerves than a pleasure jaunt. Wind blew sand over the track, and the bus sometimes became bogged, so that passengers had to get out and push it free. From its early days Randwick had a divided society. The wealthy lived elegantly in large houses built when Pearce promoted Randwick and Coogee as a fashionable area. But the market gardens, orchards and piggeries that continued alongside the large estates were the lot of the working class. Even on the later estates that became racing empires, many jockeys and stablehands lived in huts or even under canvas. An even poorer group were the immigrants who existed on the periphery of Randwick in a place called Irishtown, in the area now known as The Spot, around the junction of St.Paul's Street and Perouse Road. Here families lived in makeshift houses, taking on the most menial tasks in their struggle to survive.

In 1858 when the NSW Government passed the Municipalities Act, enabling formation of municipal districts empowered to collect rates and borrow money to improve their suburb, Randwick was the first suburb to apply for the status of a municipality. It was approved in February 1859, and its first Council was elected in March 1859.

Randwick had been the venue for sporting events, as well as duels and illegal sports, from the early days in the colony's history. Its first racecourse, the Sandy Racecourse or Old Sand Track, had been a hazardous track over hills and gullies since 1860. When a move was made in 1863 by John Tait, to establish Randwick Racecourse, Simeon Pearce was furious, especially when he heard that Tait also intended to move into Byron Lodge. Tait's venture prospered, however and he became the first person in Australia to organise racing as a commercial sport. The racecourse made a big difference to the progress of Randwick. The horse-drawn omnibus gave way to trams that linked the suburb to Sydney and civilisation. Randwick soon became a prosperous and lively place, and it still retains a busy residential, professional and commercial life.

Today, some of the houses have been replaced by home units. Many European migrants have made their homes in the area, along with students and workers at the nearby University of NSW and the Prince of Wales Hospital.

=== Venice ===
The site on which Venice stands was originally part of a 12 hectares (30 acres) 3 rods and 9 Perches Crown Grant to the Church of England and Ireland. In 1882 the Church began sub-dividing the land under the name of St Marks Glebe. A Sydney solicitor, Thomas James Dickson leased Lots 1 and 2 Section 1 for the term of 99 years. The rent was A£13 per annum and the lessee was expected to build a solid house on the land, maintain it, pay the rates and taxes. No noxious trades were allowed for example boiling down works, slaughter house or beer house.

In 1884 Dickson sold the residue of his lease to Stephen Gee a builder of Sydney for the sum of £20. This amount indicates that some type of building would have been erected, most probably the stables. The deed indicates 'the parcel of land as described together with...all houses buildings, ways, paths etc...for the remainder now to come and unexpired of the said term of 99 years.' In 1889 Gee sold the residence of his lease for these 2 lots to Joseph Jonathon Dakin for the sum of £120] an increase of 600% which indicates undoubtedly that Gee built this "gentlemans" residence. The annual rent fixed by the Church of England remained at £13 per year. Dakin was a builder from Randwick.

The Sydney Water Board map of 1891 shows water connections to all completed houses in this area of Randwick. An outline of Venice and two small buildings to the rear is shown. Also shown is a "fountain" marked on the north side of Venice to which a water connection appears.

The Sands Directory of 1893 contains the first listing of a resident for No. 66 is a Mrs Nicholson and the next year a Mrs. Maquire for the next two years. It is interesting to note that the building does not appeared to have been lived in by Stephen Gee for more than six years.

From 1897 to 1906 the name Venice appears in the Sands Directory with resident G.H. Holmes. It is possible that Holmes was a lessee during these 9 years. From 1909 to 1919 a number of different names are listed as residents for the ten years. In 1920 Venice is referred to for the first time in the Directory as Venice Flats with four residents listed. During this time it was altered considerably during its conversion to four self-contained units.

In 1979 Venice is purchased by Dr H. M. Kalmath and his wife Kasturi Kalmath for a family home and restoration is commenced in the 1980s. Following representations by the Randwick Historical Society expressing concern over the dilapidated condition of Venice an Interim Heritage Order was made over the property on 27 July 1979.

At its meeting of 7 May 1981 the Heritage Council of NSW resolved to recommend that a Permanent Conservation Order should be made over the property. On 10 July 1981 the then Minister for Planning and Environment the Hon. Eric Bedford MP approved the making of a Permanent Conservation Order. An objection to the proposed Order was subsequently lodged and a Commission of Inquiry was set for 11 February 1982. Following further discussions, the objector withdrew their objection to the making of the Permanent Conservation Order. A Permanent Conservation Order was made over the property on 15 May 1982 and it was transferred to the State Heritage Register on 2 April 1999.

In 2009 funding was provided through the NSW Heritage Grants program for conservation works.

== Description ==
Venice is an impressive and substantial two storeyed Late Victorian gentleman's residence designed in the Gothic Revival style. The house contains a symmetrical front facade incorporating a central projecting entry bay flanked by gablets and one storey verandahs featuring elaborate timber fretwork.

In plan the house is also symmetrical with a centrally placed hallway of generous proportions incorporating a grand staircase, behind which is located an intricately patterned stained glass window.

The ground floor reception rooms are located either side of the hallway while to the rear right-hand side is sited the service wing.

Period detailing is of a high standard throughout with diagonal chimneys, tessellated tiled path and hallway, leadlight front door, bay windows, timber wainscoting, fireplaces and elaborately moulded cornices, ceilings and roses.

The resultant design is very distinctive and there is no similar house design within the Municipality of Randwick.

The quality of the detailing and design suggest the use of an architect, although no conclusive evidence is available to substantiate this view.

=== Modifications and dates ===
- 1884/1885 constructed
- 1920 converted to flats

== Heritage listing ==
As at 19 September 2011, Venice is a comparatively rare and distinctive example of late Victorian Gothic architecture retaining most of its period detailing intact. The house and remaining garden make a notable contribution to the Frenchman Road streetscape and the early historical identity of Randwick. The house is of architectural significance to Randwick and to New South Wales.

Venice was listed on the New South Wales State Heritage Register on 2 April 1999.
