= Carthona =

Carthona may refer to:

In Australia

- Carthona, Darling Point
- Carthona (Kensington)
