= Rathven, Randwick =

Heritage-listed building in Randwick, Sydney, Australia

Rathven
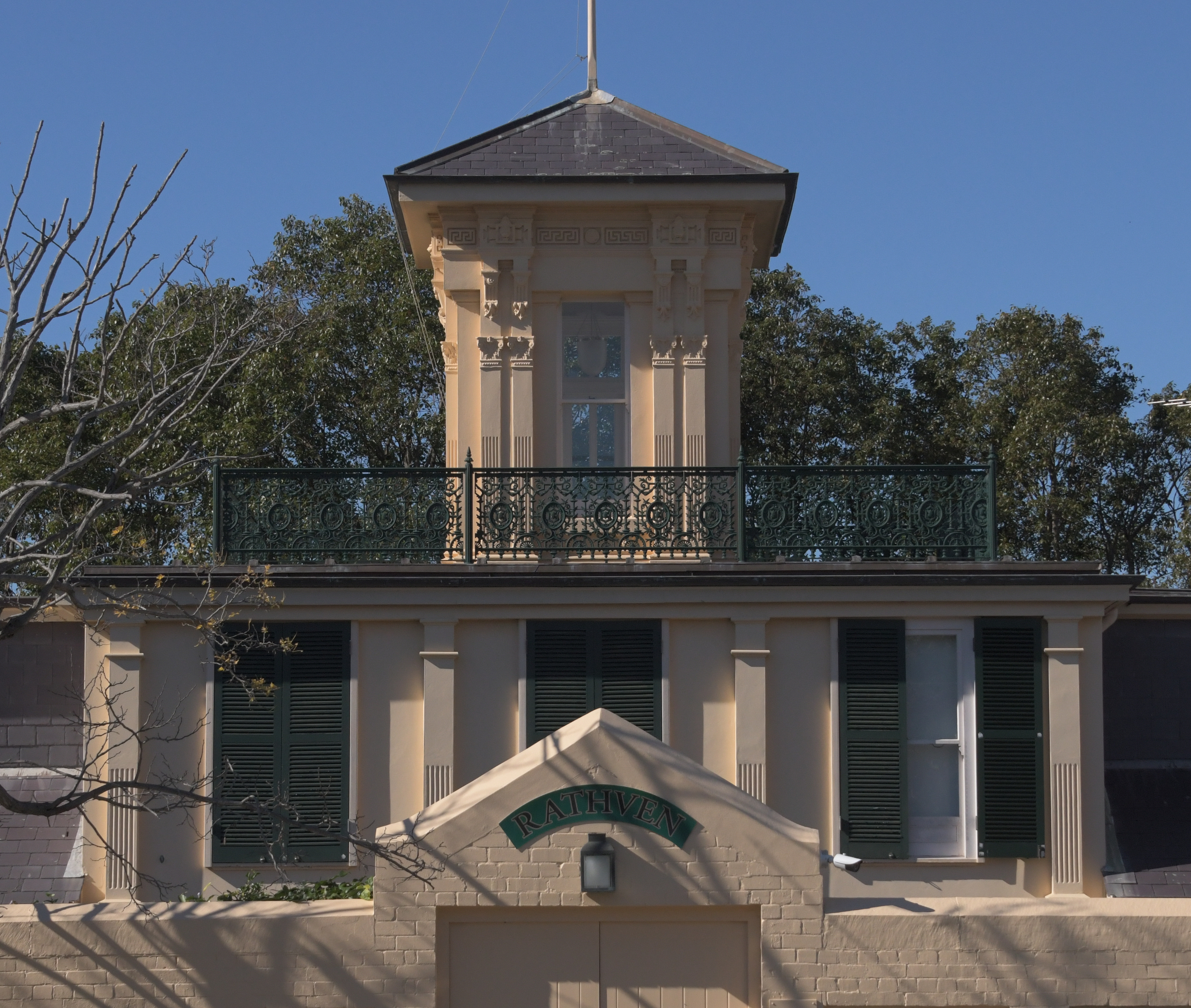
- Rathven

- Location within Sydney Location within Australia
- 33°54′39″S 151°14′50″E
- Location: 43 St Marks Road, Randwick, City of Randwick, New South Wales, Australia

History
- Built: 1887

Site notes
- Architect: George Raffan
- Architectural style: Victorian

New South Wales Heritage Register
- Official name: Rathven
- Type: State heritage (complex / group)
- Designated: 2 April 1999
- Reference no.: 139
- Type: Villa
- Category: Residential buildings (private)
- Builders: George Raffan

Rathven is a heritage-listed former private residence and boarding house for school and private residence in the Sydney suburb of Randwick in the City of Randwick local government area of New South Wales, Australia. It was designed and built by George Raffan during 1887. It was added to the New South Wales State Heritage Register on 2 April 1999.

== History ==
=== Colonial history ===
One of the earliest land grants in this area was made in 1824 to Captain Francis Marsh, who received 4.9 hectares (12 acres) bounded by the present Botany and High Streets, Alison and Belmore Roads. In 1839 William Newcombe acquired the land north-west of the present town hall in Avoca Street.

Randwick takes its name from the town of Randwick, Gloucestershire, England. The name was suggested by Simeon Pearce (1821–86) and his brother James. Simeon was born in the English Randwick and the brothers were responsible for the early development of both Randwick and its neighbour, Coogee. Simeon had come to the colony in 1841 as a 21 year old surveyor. He built his Blenheim House on the 1.6 hectares (4 acres) he bought from Marsh, and called his property "Randwick". The brothers bought and sold land profitably in the area and elsewhere. Simeon campaigned for construction of a road from the city to Coogee (achieved in 1853) and promoted the incorporation of the suburb. Pearce sought construction of a church modelled on the church of St. John in his birthplace. In 1857 the first St Jude's stood on the site of the present post office, at the corner of the present Alison Road and Avoca Street.

Randwick was slow to progress. The village was isolated from Sydney by swamps and sandhills, and although a horse-drawn omnibus was operated by a man named Grice from the late 1850s, the journey was more a test of nerves than a pleasure jaunt. Wind blew sand over the track, and the bus sometimes became bogged, so that passengers had to get out and push it free. From its early days Randwick had a divided society. The wealthy lived elegantly in large houses built when Pearce promoted Randwick and Coogee as a fashionable area. But the market gardens, orchards and piggeries that continued alongside the large estates were the lot of the working class. Even on the later estates that became racing empires, many jockeys and stablehands lived in huts or even under canvas. An even poorer group were the immigrants who existed on the periphery of Randwick in a place called Irishtown, in the area now known as The Spot, around the junction of St.Paul's Street and Perouse Road. Here families lived in makeshift houses, taking on the most menial tasks in their struggle to survive.

In 1858, when the NSW Government passed the Municipalities Act, enabling formation of municipal districts empowered to collect rates and borrow money to improve their suburb, Randwick was the first suburb to apply for the status of a municipality. It was approved in February 1859, and its first Council was elected in March 1859.

Randwick had been the venue for sporting events, as well as duels and illegal sports, from the early days in the colony's history. Its first racecourse, the Sandy Racecourse or Old Sand Track, had been a hazardous track over hills and gullies since 1860. When a move was made in 1863 by John Tait, to establish Randwick Racecourse, Simeon Pearce was furious, especially when he heard that Tait also intended to move into Byron Lodge. Tait's venture prospered, however and he became the first person in Australia to organise racing as a commercial sport. The racecourse made a big difference to the progress of Randwick. The horse-drawn omnibus gave way to trams that linked the suburb to Sydney and civilisation. Randwick soon became a prosperous and lively place, and it still retains a busy residential, professional and commercial life.

Today, some of the houses have been replaced by home units. Many European migrants have made their homes in the area, along with students and workers at the nearby University of NSW and the Prince of Wales Hospital.

=== Rathven ===
Rathven was constructed c. 1887 by George Raffan as a residence on land that extended to the bottom of Glebe Gully, with its gardens featuring Norfolk Island pines (Araucaria heterophylla), huge bamboos (probably Bambusa balcooa) and two Port Jackson fig trees (Ficus rubiginosa).

George Raffan was a prominent Sydney businessman and grazier. He was a northern Scot, born in the county of Banffshire and arrived in New South Wales in 1874. After his arrival he had a shop on Bridge Street, Sydney near the Tank Stream. He commenced business as a building contractor, and within five years became one of the leading contractors of Sydney. He pioneered the cement industry and became a pastoralist, owning Lue and Cooyal stations at Mudgee. He died suddenly in Sydney in 1915.

The following information is from the Sands Directory:

- 1888 – G Raffan – Builder
- 1889–1912 – same entry as above
- 1913 – G Raffan J.P – Contractor
- 1915 – Gordon Dixon
- 1918 – Gordon Dixon
- 1921 – J.N. Silk
- 1925 – Abraham M Loewenthal

After its 1927 sale by Abraham M. Loewenthal, Rathven operated as a boarding school for Sydney Grammar School until 1976. During this period a large two-storey classroom wing was added and the billiard room demolished. The school vacated the property in 1977/78 and was sold to a developer in 1979.

In January 1979 community representations were received from the Randwick and Districts Historical Society, Randwick Residents Action Group and the Randwick Glebe Gully Preservation Group concerned that Rathven was to be demolished as part of a proposed development of the Glebe Gully. An Interim Heritage Order placed over the property on 4 May 1979. A Permanent Conservation Order under the NSW Heritage Act was placed on the property on 23 October 1981 by then Minister for Planning, Paul Landa, after 72 residential apartments were proposed for the site.

It was purchased in 1982 by Terry Bolin and his wife Robin who with the financial assistance of the Heritage Council Heritage Incentives Programme completed a considerable schedule of works conserving and restoring Rathven. It was transferred to the State Heritage Register on 2 April 1999.

== Description ==
Rathven is a large two-storey house of high Victorian domestic architecture. The roof has an unusual mansard and dormer design with a central tower, which is not part of the perimeter walls, with surrounding 'widow's walk'. In elevation the house is asymmetrical with a rounded projecting bay on the southern end.

Rathven's interior details includes cornices, ornate ceilings and fine joinery remaining intact and in good condition.

It is set on a 2,117-square-metre (22,790 sq ft) site with landscaped grounds in-ground swimming pool, spa, tennis court, lawn area, mature trees and shrubs. The house has six bedrooms, six bathrooms, double garage, formal living, dining rooms, reception and study.

=== Condition ===
As at 22 September 2011, the physical condition is good.

=== Modifications and dates ===
- 1980s – conservation and restoration.
- 1980s – sold in derelict condition. A double garage was built, later a swimming pool, spa and tennis court.
- 2007 – install door to double garage built in the late 1980s to provide pedestrian access.

== Heritage listing ==
As at 8 September 2011, Rathven constructed c. 1887 is a large two-storey house of high Victorian domestic architecture. It is associated with George Raffan who was a prominent Sydney businessman and grazier. He pioneered the cement industry and is associated with Portland Cement. The house and its features are unique in the Randwick area.

Rathven was listed on the New South Wales State Heritage Register on 2 April 1999.

== See also ==
- Australian residential architectural styles
