= Hooper Cottage =

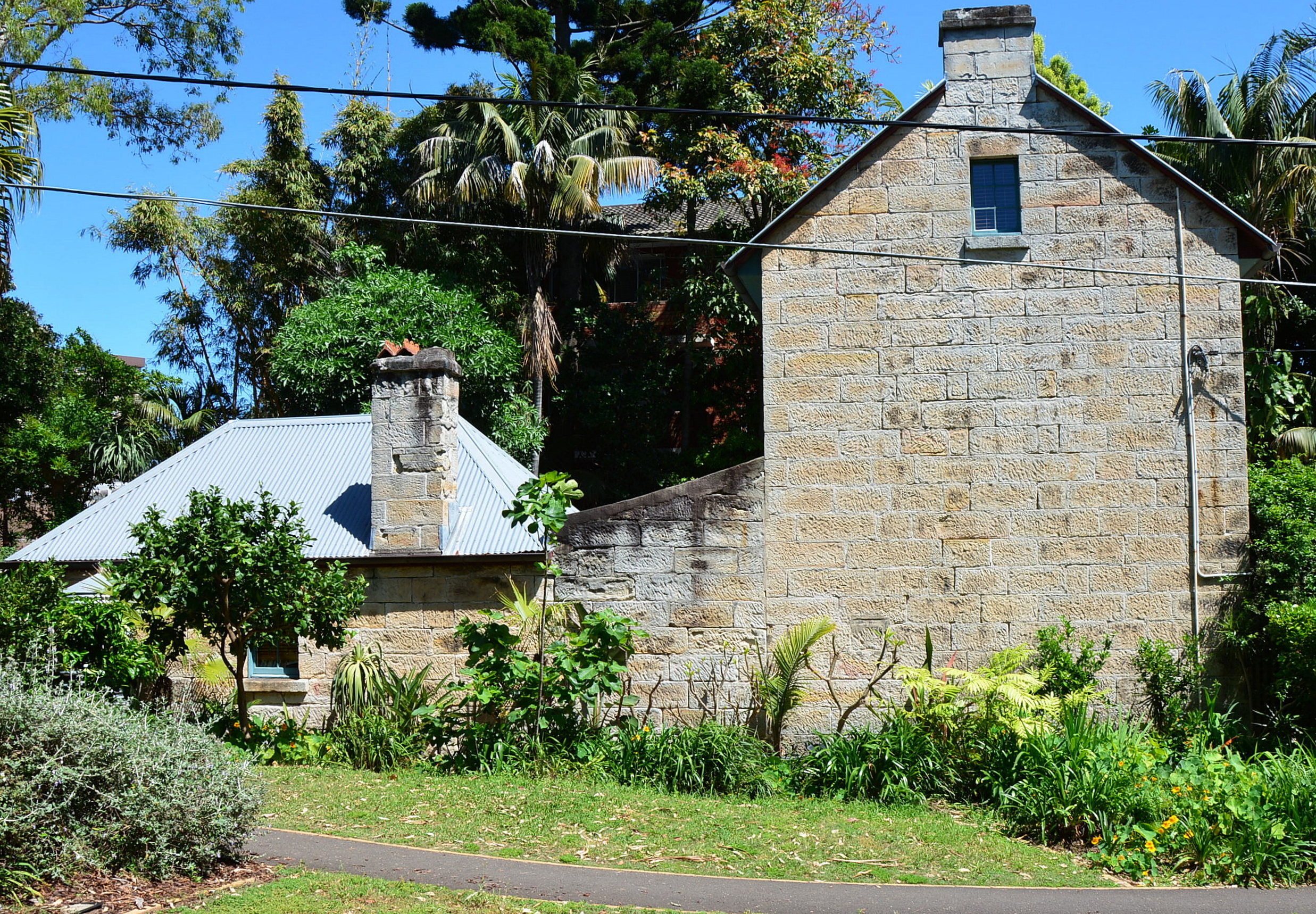
- Hopper Cottage, pictured in 2014

- Location within Sydney Location within Australia
- 33°54′22″S 151°14′51″E
- Location: 17 Gilderthorpe Avenue, Randwick, City of Randwick, New South Wales, Australia

History
- Built: 1847–1848

Site notes
- Architectural style: Victorian Georgian

New South Wales Heritage Register
- Official name: Hooper Cottage
- Type: State heritage (built)
- Designated: 2 April 1999
- Reference no.: 87
- Type: Cottage
- Category: Residential buildings (private)

Hooper Cottage is a heritage-listed residence at 17 Gilderthorpe Avenue in the Sydney suburb of Randwick, New South Wales, Australia. It was built from 1847 to 1848. It was added to the New South Wales State Heritage Register on 2 April 1999.

== History ==
=== Indigenous history ===
Pre-1780s - local Aboriginal people in the area used the site for fishing and cultural activities; rock engravings, grinding grooves and middens remain in evidence. In 1789 Governor Arthur Phillip referred to "a long bay", which became known as Long Bay. Aboriginal people are believed to have inhabited the Sydney region for at least 20,000 years. The population of Aboriginal people between Palm Beach and Botany Bay in 1788 has been estimated to have been 1500. Those living south of Port Jackson to Botany Bay were the Cadigal people who spoke Dharug, while the local clan name of Maroubra people was "Muru-ora-dial". By the mid nineteenth century the traditional owners of this land had typically either moved inland in search of food and shelter, or had died as the result of European disease or confrontation with British colonisers.

=== Colonial history ===
One of the earliest land grants in this area was made in 1824 to Captain Francis Marsh, who received 4.9 hectares (12 acres) bounded by the present Botany and High Streets, Alison and Belmore Roads. In 1839 William Newcombe acquired the land north-west of the present town hall in Avoca Street.

Randwick takes its name from the town of Randwick, Gloucestershire, England. The name was suggested by Simeon Pearce (1821–86) and his brother James. Simeon was born in the English Randwick and the brothers were responsible for the early development of both Randwick and its neighbour, Coogee. Simeon had come to the colony in 1841 as a 21 year old surveyor. He built his Blenheim House on the 1.6 hectares (4 acres) he bought from Marsh, and called his property "Randwick". The brothers bought and sold land profitably in the area and elsewhere. Simeon campaigned for construction of a road from the city to Coogee (achieved in 1853) and promoted the incorporation of the suburb. Pearce sought construction of a church modelled on the church of St. John in his birthplace. In 1857 the first St Jude's stood on the site of the present post office, at the corner of the present Alison Road and Avoca Street.

Randwick was slow to progress. The village was isolated from Sydney by swamps and sandhills, and although a horse-drawn omnibus was operated by a man named Grice from the late 1850s, the journey was more a test of nerves than a pleasure jaunt. Wind blew sand over the track, and the bus sometimes became bogged, so that passengers had to get out and push it free. From its early days Randwick had a divided society. The wealthy lived elegantly in large houses built when Pearce promoted Randwick and Coogee as a fashionable area. But the market gardens, orchards and piggeries that continued alongside the large estates were the lot of the working class. Even on the later estates that became racing empires, many jockeys and stablehands lived in huts or even under canvas. An even poorer group were the immigrants who existed on the periphery of Randwick in a place called Irishtown, in the area now known as The Spot, around the junction of St.Paul's Street and Perouse Road. Here families lived in makeshift houses, taking on the most menial tasks in their struggle to survive.

In 1858 when the NSW Government passed the Municipalities Act, enabling formation of municipal districts empowered to collect rates and borrow money to improve their suburb, Randwick was the first suburb to apply for the status of a municipality. It was approved in February 1859, and its first Council was elected in March 1859.

Randwick had been the venue for sporting events, as well as duels and illegal sports, from the early days in the colony's history. Its first racecourse, the Sandy Racecourse or Old Sand Track, had been a hazardous track over hills and gullies since 1860. When a move was made in 1863 by John Tait, to establish Randwick Racecourse, Simeon Pearce was furious, especially when he heard that Tait also intended to move into Byron Lodge. Tait's venture prospered, however and he became the first person in Australia to organise racing as a commercial sport. The racecourse made a big difference to the progress of Randwick. The horse-drawn omnibus gave way to trams that linked the suburb to Sydney and civilisation. Randwick soon became a prosperous and lively place, and it still retains a busy residential, professional and commercial life.

Today, some of the houses have been replaced by home units. Many European migrants have made their homes in the area, along with students and workers at the nearby University of NSW and the Prince of Wales Hospital.

=== Hooper Cottage's land ===
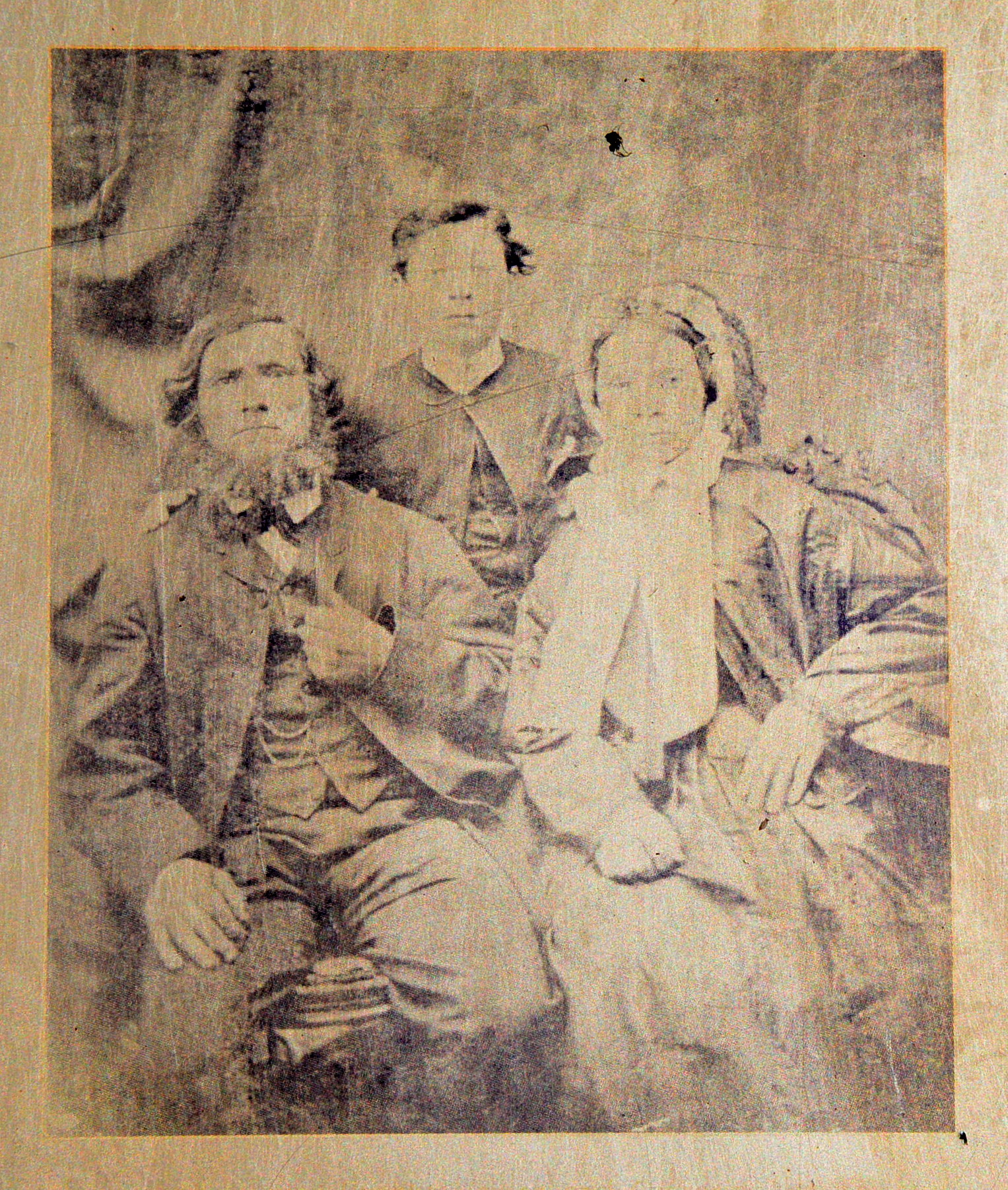
19th century image of George and Mary Hopper, and son.

Land originally a Crown grant to Captain Marsh in 1824. In 1847 Alderman, Council auditor and one of area's first residents, market gardener George Hooper bought the 26 hectares (65 acres) of land for orchards and market gardens, and built the first (single storey) cottage in the same year on about 5.3 hectares (13 acres) as a farmhouse. In 1848 Hooper builds vernacular two-storey Georgian house with courtyard, and converts original cottage to kitchen/servants' quarters. c. 1860 the name Figtree Avenue first appears on a map (street to west of cottage). In 1864 George Hooper leaves for Queensland, making Simeon Pearce his trustee. The estate and house left in trust to Hooper's wife Mary. Pearce was actively trying to entice wealthy residents to the Randwick area, and Hooper was a friend of the Pearce family. George's brother, James Hooper, worked as a market gardener on Randwick Road in 1858–59 (Sands Directory), and from 1865 to 1880 James was listed as living in Orange Street; name changed to Gilderthorpe Avenue sometime after 1925.

In the 1840-80 period of market gardens and orchards in area, supplying close by City Markets. Occupants of Hooper's cottage were market gardeners. 1887 the cottage was bought by Catherine Hooper, widow of James Hooper, and her daughter Mary Ann McQuigan. In the mid-1880s subdivisions and public sales in Randwick area. "Hooper's garden" or "Garden Estate" titles. The 1890s sale of land around Hooper's cottage. Orange Street renamed Gilderthorpe Avenue and Clovelly Road (cottage is on northern side of this road, on western side of Figtree Avenue). In c. 1925 Orange Street renamed Gilderthorpe Avenue.

In the 1930s urbanisation of area complete. Hooper Cottage on existing sized block. c. 1940s 19 Hill's figs (Ficus hillii) planted along Figtree Avenue, including two near Hooper's Cottage.

The northern verandah fell off c. 1968 and was rebuilt 1980. During 1978 Randwick Council tried to purchase the cottage to preserve it, but the family of the former owner refused to sell to Council. During 1979 the cottage (deceased estate of Elizabeth Aveline McGuigan) was put on the market for sale and the Heritage Council of NSW received representations from the Randwick and District Historical Society and Randwick Council seeking a conservation order.

On 4 January 1980 an Interim Conservation Order was placed over the property. On 12 February a Permanent Conservation Order was placed over the property. In 1985 Randwick Council closes off southern end of Figtree Avenue and makes road closure park, 2 Hill's figs (Ficus hillii) in park outside Hooper's Cottage date from c. 1930–40. On 2 April 1999 the property is transferred to the State Heritage Register.

== Description ==
Vernacular two storey Victorian Georgian cottage, rectangular plan, small roof span, symmetrical chimneys, windows, doors. Rear facade faces Gilderthorpe Avenue (formerly Orange Street). Orientation clearly shows it was part of a much larger estate of 26 hectares (65 acres).

Skillion verandah at rear (main facade to north). Has a rare insurance plaque above top middle window on north facade. Detached rear single storey sandstone kitchen / servants' quarters (was probably Hooper's original c. 1847 cottage, later converted once he built his 1848 vernacular Georgian house). Open courtyard between.

=== Modifications and dates ===
- 1860s Orange Street renamed Gilderthorpe Avenue
- c. 1860 the name Figtree Avenue first appears on a map.
- c. 1868 Northern verandah fell off c. 1968 and was rebuilt 1980.
- 1889 Water Board map shows:
  - kitchen and main house separate
  - kitchen has bread oven extension (North side, towards house)
  - outside WC in NW corner of property
  - No verandah on kitchen
- 1994 Works completed by mid 1994: (cost $45,000; 30,000 provided as low interest loan by NSW Heritage Assistance Program).
  - Kitchen verandah rebuilt and extended along the full length of the western kitchen wall. Roofs replaced, gutters, downpipes, stormater system installed to minimise rising damp problem. Plumbing in bathroom and kitchen replaced, bathroom window installed to match original kitchen window.
  - Kitchen: removed old defective existing structure, built brick pier foundations, timber posts, timber roof structure to detail of original verandah, new c/iron roof, galv.steel traditional downpipe and gutter.
  - Kitchen roof: removed old defective existing roofing, built timber fascia boards, internal timber lining, insulation foil, gal.c/iron roof sheeting, three clear corrugated sheets for skylights, gal. steel box gutter for link roof between two buildings, gal. steel traditional gutters and downpipe, lead flashing around chimney.
  - Main house roof: removed old defective roofing material, original shingles still under roofing iron, existing batons badly termite affected. Shingles removed to replace batons. Built timber fascia boards, batons, aluminium insulation foil, gal. c/iron sheeting, gal. steel gutters and downpipes, lead flashings around chimneys.
  - Bathroom – kitchen – stone work.
  - Replaced 6 badly eroded sandstone blocks next to door to kitchen, built stone window sill for bathroom window, stone fill to narrow down window to match original kitchen window.

== Heritage listing ==
As at 14 September 2011, Hooper Cottage has historic significance as the second-oldest building remaining, the oldest farmhouse building and the only remaining building illustrative of working class cottages in the Randwick Municipal Area in what was once a rural setting. Hooper Cottage has the ability to demonstrate a way of life in early Randwick and Sydney through its role in housing market gardeners who supplied the city's markets.

The cottage has social significance for its ability to illustrate 19th century lifestyles and perceptions. The contrasts in scale and finishes between the kitchen area to the rear (which may have been servant's quarters) and the vernacular Georgian house market gardener George Hooper built illustrate perceptions of social status in the 19th century. Architecturally and aesthetically significant as an increasingly rare sandstone worker's cottage which was converted to servant's quarters/kitchen block, and an intact example of vernacular Georgian domestic architecture.

Hooper Cottage was listed on the New South Wales State Heritage Register on 2 April 1999.

== See also ==
- Australian residential architectural styles
