= Randwick Presbyterian Church =

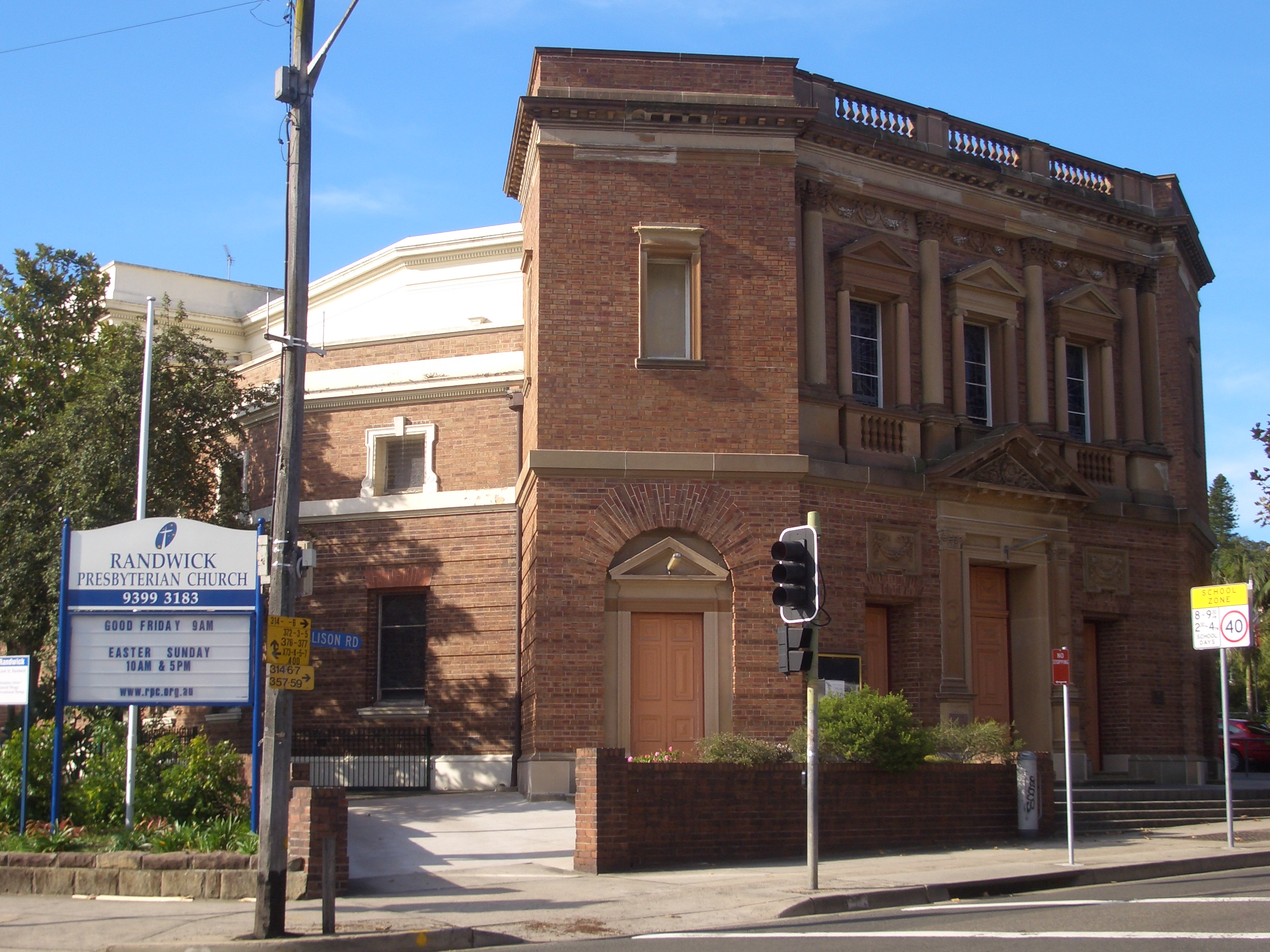
- Randwick Presbyterian Church, in 2007.
- Randwick Presbyterian Church
- 33°54′45″S 151°14′23″E
- Location: 162 Alison Road, Randwick, New South Wales
- Country: Australia
- Denomination: Presbyterian
- Website: www.rpc.org.au

History
- Status: Church
- Founded: 9 March 1889
- Founder: Henry Clarke
- Dedicated: 16 March 1890

Architecture
- Functional status: Active
- Architect: Sir John Sulman
- Architectural type: Church
- Style: Victorian Academic Classical
- Years built: 1889–1890
- Construction cost: A£5,790

Administration
- Division: New South Wales
- Parish: Randwick

New South Wales Heritage Register
- Official name: Randwick Presbyterian Church
- Type: State heritage (built)
- Designated: 8 May 2008
- Reference no.: 1777
- Type: Church
- Category: Religion
- Builders: George Gale

The Randwick Presbyterian Church is a heritage-listed Presbyterian church located at 162 Alison Road in the Sydney suburb of Randwick, New South Wales, Australia. The church was designed by Sir John Sulman and built from 1889 to 1890 by George Gale. The property is owned by the Randwick Presbyterian Church and was added to the New South Wales State Heritage Register on 8 May 2008.

== History ==
=== Indigenous history ===
Pre-1780s the local Aboriginal people in the area used the site for fishing and cultural activities; rock engravings, grinding grooves and middens remain in evidence. In 1789 Governor Arthur Phillip referred to "a long bay", which became known as Long Bay. Aboriginal people are believed to have inhabited the Sydney region for at least 20,000 years. The population of Aboriginal people between Palm Beach and Botany Bay in 1788 has been estimated to have been 1,500. Those living south of Port Jackson to Botany Bay were the Cadigal people who spoke Dharug, while the local clan name of Maroubra people was "Muru-ora-dial". By the mid-19th century the traditional owners of this land had typically either moved inland in search of food and shelter or had died as the result of European disease or confrontation with British colonisers.

=== Colonial history ===
One of the earliest land grants in this area was made in 1824 to Captain Francis Marsh, who received 12 acres bounded by the present Botany and High Streets, Alison and Belmore Roads. In 1839 William Newcombe acquired the land north-west of the present town hall in Avoca Street.

Randwick takes its name from the town of Randwick, Gloucestershire, England. The name was suggested by Simeon Pearce (1821–86) and his brother James. Simeon was born in the English Randwick and the brothers were responsible for the early development of both Randwick and its neighbour, Coogee. Simeon had come to the colony in 1841as a 21-year-old surveyor. He built his Blenheim House on the 4 acres he bought from Marsh, and called his property "Randwick". The brothers bought and sold land profitably in the area and elsewhere. Simeon campaigned for construction of a road from the city to Coogee (achieved in 1853) and promoted the incorporation of the suburb. Pearce sought construction of a church modelled on the church of St. John in his birthplace. In 1857 the first St Jude's stood on the site of the present post office, at the corner of the present Alison Road and Avoca Street.

Randwick was slow to progress. The village was isolated from Sydney by swamps and sandhills, and although a horse-drawn omnibus was operated by a man named Grice from the late 1850s, the journey was more a test of nerves than a pleasure jaunt. Wind blew sand over the track, and the bus sometimes became bogged, so that passengers had to get out and push it free. From its early days, Randwick had a divided society. The wealthy lived elegantly in large houses built when Pearce promoted Randwick and Coogee as a fashionable area. But the market gardens, orchards and piggeries that continued alongside the large estates were the lot of the working class. Even on the later estates that became racing empires, many jockeys and stablehands lived in huts or even under canvas. An even poorer group were the immigrants who existed on the periphery of Randwick in a place called Irishtown, in the area now known as The Spot, around the junction of St. Paul's Street and Perouse Road. Here families lived in makeshift houses, taking on the most menial tasks in their struggle to survive.

In 1858 when the NSW Government passed the Municipalities Act, enabling formation of municipal districts empowered to collect rates and borrow money to improve their suburb, Randwick was the first suburb to apply for the status of a municipality. It was approved in February 1859, and its first Council was elected in March 1859.

Randwick had been the venue for sporting events, as well as duels and illegal sports, from the early days in the colony's history. Its first racecourse, the Sandy Racecourse or Old Sand Track, had been a hazardous track over hills and gullies since 1860. When a move was made in 1863 by John Tait, to establish Randwick Racecourse, Simeon Pearce was furious, especially when he heard that Tait also intended to move into Byron Lodge. Tait's venture prospered, however, and he became the first person in Australia to organise racing as a commercial sport. The racecourse made a big difference to the progress of Randwick. The horse-drawn omnibus gave way to trams that linked the suburb to Sydney and civilisation. Randwick soon became a prosperous and lively place, and it still retains a busy residential, professional and commercial life.

Today, some of the houses have been replaced by home units. Many European migrants have made their homes in the area, along with students and workers at the nearby University of NSW and the Prince of Wales Hospital.

The founder and promoter of the village of Randwick was Simeon Pearce who envisaged the area as a "New Brighton" by the sea but also as a place that had many of the traditional English village qualities of his birthplace of Randwick in Gloucestershire. As a Commissioner of Church and School lands he was well placed to have areas of land set aside for church and school use, and in 1854 a large area of land was granted on the east side of Alison Park for Church of England use then in 1857 on the west side for the Presbyterian Church. Between the church lands, Simeon proposed a general cemetery but because of residents objections this became a cricket ground (later renamed to Alison Park).

=== The establishment of the Randwick Presbyterian Congregation ===
Up until the 1880s Sydney's Presbyterians had worshipped in Presbyterian churches located in Sydney City. However, in the 1880s this trend changed with a preliminary meeting of the Randwick Congregation in the Randwick Town Hall on 17 November 1884; the first Presbyterian service in Waverley was held on 17 January 1885; and in Woollahra on 12 February 1888.

An interim session was appointed by the Presbytery to assist the Randwick parishioners in establishing a church there and the Moderator Rev. Dr Gilchrist conducted the first session at the Town Hall on 4 August 1885. As a result, a committee of management was set up acting on the Church Code and considered a number of potential Ministers. The Rev Dr Will Scott Frackelton who arrived in Sydney from the United Kingdom in 1885, was appointed as the first Randwick Minister. He was inducted on 23 November at the Randwick Town Hall.

The new Minister, supported by the congregation, was convinced that a new church was required and initially the land granted for that purpose in 1857 was put aside in favour of private land in Avoca Street, however, the original grant was eventually taken up with part of the northern allotments being sold as unnecessary and the project for the new church was put in hand.

=== The selection of the church design ===
In 1886 the recently arrived English architect, John Sulman, made an offer to the new Randwick Presbyterian Congregation to draw up plans for a church to house the congregation. Sulman had excellent architectural credentials and came from an established and respected architectural practice in England which had designed at least 66 churches in England, many of them combining church schools, for non conformist churches including Presbyterian and Congregational denominations. It is noted that Sulman and his family travelled to Australia on the Orient Line ship RMS Austral in 1885, and it is likely that on this voyage he made the acquaintance of the first resident Minister of the Randwick congregation, the Rev. Will Scott Frackelton.

The initial design submitted by Sulman was subsequently published in the report of the Presbyterian Church Annual Meeting of 1886. While it is similar in design to the extant church this initial design was much larger in scale. Sulman subsequently submitted a revised design on 8 October 1888, with his professional practice partner Joseph Porter Power. A short period later a new Building Committee met and accepted Sulman and Power's design on condition that: it was built for A£4,000; that the church width be reduced to by six feet; and that it be built of brick with stone dressings instead of stucco on the front facade.

=== The church design ===
The church design as accepted by the Randwick Presbyterian Church was essentially a neo-classic design of Baroque derivation having its entrance facade dominated by two tall towers. A perspective of this design published in a number of newspapers is all that is known to remain of the architect's drawings. While the towers displayed in this plan were not undertaken (due to economic considerations) the extant church appears to be consistent with this plan.

A newspaper article of the period stated that "its internal arrangement which is at once novel and excellent, and will be found to be, so far as its acoustic properties are concerned, one of the best buildings of its class in the colony, whilst the congregation will have from every part an uninterrupted view of the preacher". It was also said that seating was provided on the ground floor for 441 and in the gallery for 226, allowing for the accommodation of 667 parishioners.

Randwick Presbyterian Church is attributed to John Sulman who designed churches in a number of styles including English Gothic (Springwood); Romanesque (Manly and Woollahra), and was well known for preparing a large number of alternative styles for banks. It is speculated, however, that the final design may be due in part to the influence of the Minister Will Frackleton, who had travelled, preached and studied extensively in the United States of America. Its derivation is also most likely based on the standard Scottish T-Plan Church with galleries, a famous Sydney example being James Barnet's c. 1854 Chalmers Presbyterian Church in Chalmers Street, Surry Hills. The interior with its gallery is also similar to St Andrew's Presbyterian Church at Evandale and the Pitt Street Congregational Church in Sydney. It has been noted that the first design submitted by Sulman in 1886 bears a striking resemblance to the c. 1814 First Scots Presbyterian Church of Charleston, South Carolina, with its large central portico, twin Baroque towers and a transverse classroom wing at the rear. It is noted that Sulman also travelled widely in Britain and Europe and may have been aware of a similar church built in Glasgow in 1870, being the Govan United Presbyterian Church designed by James Thomson.

It is considered that although the Sulman and Power design of the church was not of the usual Gothic revival style favoured at the time, it is related to a school of church architectural design based on neoclassic, particularly Greek Revival and Georgian designs that can be traced back to the churches of the convict architect Francis Greenway. It was of a style not uncommon in Sydney up to that time although the proposed twin towers (not built) were a departure in the design for a suburban parish church.

=== The construction of the church ===
The building contract was awarded to the prominent Sydney builder and resident of Randwick, Mr George Gale, who had been responsible for building many projects including works for the noted Melbourne architect, William Pitt, who designed the Princess Theatre and the Rialto Buildings amongst many during Melbourne's building boom.

The foundation stone for the church was laid by the Hon. Henry Clarke MP, on 9 March 1889, and the official opening took place on 16 March 1890. Sulman was in the congregation for the service delivered by the Rev. Dr Frackleton and the address given by Rev. Dr Steel.

It was reported that the interior fittings and furniture were provided by Messrs Eaton Brothers and that the total cost of the project was A£5,790. This amount exceeded the available funds available such that the church had to borrow £2,000 to cover the debts.

=== Pipe organ ===
The extant pipe organ was installed in 1903 as a gift of Mrs Jane Fischer in memory of her son Albert Fischer who drowned at Inverell. It replaced the American organ initially purchased for the church. The organ was assembled by W. G. Rendall of Bondi Junction and is thought to contain part of an instrument built by Alfred Monk, of London, in 1854.

=== The Manse ===
The Ministers to the Parish resided in rental accommodation until the Manse was completed in 1900. The Federation style manse was designed by a member of the congregation A. A. Lewis and built under the direction of W. Webster. The building cost £1,270. The manse was modified by architects Clark, Gazzard and Partners in 1967 to create two separate residences in order to accommodate both the Minister and the Pastor.

=== The School Hall ===
The single-storey church Sunday School which is connected to the church was designed by Mr A. A. Lewis and completed in 1903. It connects with the rear elevation of the church and is aligned with the wall of the church on the Abbey Street boundary. In 1934, the 50-year jubilee of the congregation in Randwick, a second floor for the school hall was proposed, and this was completed in February 1936 by the builders, Elvey and Company. The cost these alterations amounted to 1,809 Pounds.

==== Coogee Boys' Preparatory School ====
A nondenominational Christian independent boys' school opened its doors on 21 July 1914, with 27 students in the single-storey c. 1903 school hall that adjoins the rear of the church. The school's founder and first Headmaster, Mr William Nimmo, chose the Randwick area owing to the large number of boys travelling into the city of Sydney for their education. William Nimmo remained Headmaster until retired in 1965. A second floor was added to the school hall in 1936.

=== Indonesian congregation ===
The Rev Clements was instrumental in opening the doors of the church to a wider congregation, hence, in March 1979, the first regular service was held for the Indonesian community. Pastor David Silas was the first preacher in the Indonesian Language Section. The Church is known as the Indonesian Presbyterian Church - Randwick.

=== Ministers of the Randwick Presbyterian Church ===
The following individuals have served as ministers of the Randwick Presbyterian Church, or equivalent titles:

1. Will Scott Frackleton 1885–1896
2. William Gibson Maconochie 1896–1898
3. Charles Henry Talbot 1898–1922
4. William James Grant 1922–1949
5. C. J. Vernon McKeown 1949–1967
6. Douglas Graham Ritchie 1968–1970
7. Stuart John Clements 1971–1985
8. John Lambertus Bracht 1987–1991
9. Ronald Sydney Keith 1992–1996
10. Conrad A D Hor-Kwong 1998–1999
11. Grant Spurgeon Thorp 2000–2011
12. Ian Neil Stenhouse 2013–2019

== Description ==
The Victorian Academic Classical style building consists of three distinct building forms being the centre church structure with splayed southern walls flanked at each end by taller wings, the south wing being the two-storey main entrance and stair towers and the north wing being the three-storey wing containing the vestry and classrooms.

The structure consists of load-bearing decorative brickwork in English Bond relieved at the Entrance Wing with sandstone attached columns, carved architraves and pediments to the main windows and doors and string courses, cornice moulds and balustrading at the upper levels.

Elsewhere on the other wings, the window architraves, sills and the horizontal mouldings are of painted cement which relieve the face brickwork walls. The ribbed galvanised steel roofing is placed behind horizontal parapets in either pitched or skillion roof forms.

At the northeastern corner of the building is a later two-storey stair tower and entrance which links with the school addition. The rear or north elevation of the church is treated in a simple way with windows and doors and the steel stairways attached for fire escape purposes.

=== Condition ===
As at 19 October 2006, the building is in sound condition, though the stonework on the southern facade has generally weathered with localised erosion and friable stone. The church facade and interior fabric demonstrates a high degree of integrity.

=== Modifications and dates ===
- March 1890 – Randwick Presbyterian Church opened.
- 1900 – Detached Manse designed by of A. A. Lewis, completed under the direction of W. Webster.
- 1903 – Pipe organ fitted by W. G. Rendall and single-storey Sunday School Hall designed by A. A. Lewis completed.
- 1911 – Church records indicate that the pipe organ was reconstructed and that repairs were carried out to the church, manse and fence.
- 1914 – Coogee Boys' Preparatory School opened in the single-storey church hall.
- 1936 – First-floor addition to School Hall designed by (?) was completed by the builders Elvey & Co.
- 1962 – Toilet building completed to the rear of the church.
- 1967 – A kitchen a bathroom were added to the Manse in 1967 so that the building could be divided into two residences, in order to accommodate both the Minister and the Pastor. In addition, the front porch was partly screened. These works were performed to the designs of architects Clark, Gazzard and Partners.
- 1983 – External staircases fitted to Church, Manse and School to comply with fire regulations. These works were designed by Architects Finn & McKinley Pty Ltd.

The original fence around the church was a timber picket fence as evidenced by a number of early photographs. It is not known when the fence was removed or when the present main entrance steps with flanking brick garden beds were built. As built it was reported that the main church roof was of slate but this has subsequently been replaced by a metal roof. In the years after World War II, the present stained glass windows were installed, possibly replacing plain glass windows.

== Heritage listing ==
The Randwick Presbyterian Church is of State significance for its association with the influential English Architect, Sir John Sulman (1849–1934).

Ecclesiastical architecture in New South Wales in the 19th century was predominantly designed in the Gothic Revival and Romanesque Revival styles, however, the landmark Randwick Presbyterian Church represents a significant departure from these prevailing styles. It is one of only a small number of churches designed in the Victorian Academic Classical style, and the only example of the prominent architectural firm Sulman and Power's ecclesiastical architecture designed in this particular idiom.

The church which was the first designed by Sir John Sulman in his Australian practice was originally conceived in 1886, revised in 1888 and completed in 1890. Though incomplete (the two towers were never built) it demonstrates the innovation of adapting ecclesiastical architecture to the climatic conditions of Sydney. The highly intact church interior designed in the form of a Greek theatre is considered to be Sir John Sulman's finest non-Gothic church interior, and one of the best non-Gothic church interiors in NSW.

Randwick Presbyterian Church was listed on the New South Wales State Heritage Register on 8 May 2008 having satisfied the following criteria.

The place is important in demonstrating the course, or pattern, of cultural or natural history in New South Wales.

The Randwick Presbyterian Church is of local significance for its ability to demonstrate: the establishment of the Presbyterian church in the municipality of Randwick from 1884; the spread of Presbyterianism in the suburbs of Sydney; and the architectural presence that was considered appropriate by the church during this period in NSW.

The place has a strong or special association with a person, or group of persons, of importance of cultural or natural history of New South Wales's history.

The Randwick Presbyterian Church is of State significance for its association with the influential English born architect Sir John Sulman (1849–1934). The church designed by Sulman in the Victorian Academic Classical style represents a rare departure from the Gothic Revival and Romanesque Revival style churches that prevailed in 19th century New South Wales. In addition, the Randwick Presbyterian Church is considered to be the first church designed by Sulman in NSW.

Sulman, whose practice in England had produced over seventy churches and other buildings, arrived in Australia with his family in late 1885. Sulman initially entered into a short-lived partnership with C. H. E. Blackman in 1886 and later formed a highly successful partnership with the architect Joseph Porter Power, from 1889–1908, under the title of Sulman Power Architects. Sulman became a highly influential figure in NSW in matters of architecture and town planning, giving evidence to Royal Commissions, providing advice to NSW Government Ministers, and writing at length on town planning. Many of his proposals are evident in Sydney today: the extension of Martin Place, the location of Circular Quay railway station and the widening of Elizabeth, Oxford and William streets. Sulman considered Australia's architectural heritage insignificant and at various times recommended the demolition of Hyde Park Barracks, St James's Church, Darlinghurst Gaol, Victoria Barracks and Sydney Hospital.

Sulman founded the Palladian Club in 1887 and became an honorary corresponding secretary of the R.I.B.A. In the same year he was elected vice-president of the Institute of Architects (NSW), however, his attempts to become president were thwarted by the controversial architect J. Horbury Hunt and he resigned in 1892, rejoining in 1912. Between 1887–1912 he also lectured in architecture in the faculty of engineering at the University of Sydney. After retiring in 1908, Sulman held influential positions as director of the Daily Telegraph Newspaper Co. Ltd from 1902 (chairman 1922–25), president of the Town Planning Association of New South Wales (1913–25) and chairman of the Town Planning Advisory Board to the Department of Local Government (1918). He was the Vernon Memorial Lecturer in town planning at the University of Sydney 1919–26. Sulman was also a trustee from 1899 (president from 1919) of the National Art Gallery of New South Wales. In 1930 he established the annual Sir John Sulman award for architectural merit in New South Wales.

The place is important in demonstrating aesthetic characteristics and/or a high degree of creative or technical achievement in New South Wales.

The Randwick Presbyterian Church is of State significance as an aesthetically distinctive and highly intact ecclesiastical example of the Victorian Academic Classical style in NSW. The church interior designed in the form of a Greek theatre is considered to be Sir John Sulman's finest non-Gothic church interior, and one of the best non-Gothic church interiors in NSW.

The imposing two storey brick and stone building located at a prominent intersection on one of the highest points of Randwick represents a significant departure from the dominant Gothic Revival and Romanesque Revival ecclesiastical architecture of 19th century NSW.

The Randwick Presbyterian Church is significantly the only example of a Victorian Academic Classical style church designed by the firm of Sulman and Power Architects. Furthermore, it is considered to be the first church designed by Sir John Sulman in his Australian practice. The church designed by Sulman though incomplete (the two towers were never built) demonstrates the innovation of adapting ecclesiastical architecture to the climatic conditions of Sydney.

The place has a strong or special association with a particular community or cultural group in New South Wales for social, cultural or spiritual reasons.

The Randwick Presbyterian Church possesses local social significance to the Presbyterian community of the Randwick municipality and past students of the Coogee Boys' Preparatory School.

The place has potential to yield information that will contribute to an understanding of the cultural or natural history of New South Wales.

The Randwick Presbyterian Church is of State significance as an important reference site demonstrating the adaption of European ecclesiastical architecture to the climate of the Southern Hemisphere.

Sir John Sulman (1849–1934) who is attributed with the design of the church was a proponent of building churches in keeping with Sydney's climate.

The place possesses uncommon, rare or endangered aspects of the cultural or natural history of New South Wales.

The c.1890 Randwick Presbyterian Church is of State significance as one of only a very small group of Victorian Academic Classical styled churches in New South Wales, and the only example of the prominent architectural firm Sulman and Power's ecclesiastical architecture designed in this particular idiom.

Ecclesiastical architecture in New South Wales in the 19th century was predominantly designed in the Gothic Revival and Romanesque Revival styles, and the Randwick Presbyterian Church represents a significant departure from these prevailing styles.

The church designed by the English architect Sir John Sulman (1849–1934) was originally conceived in 1886 and subsequently revised in 1888. It is considered to be the first church designed by Sulman in his Australian practice.

The place is important in demonstrating the principal characteristics of a class of cultural or natural places/environments in New South Wales.

The Randwick Presbyterian Church is representative of the architecturally impressive churches built by the Presbyterian Church in the late 19th century in the suburbs of Sydney.

== See also ==
- Australian non-residential architectural styles
- Presbyterian Church of Australia
