= Randwick Post Office =

Randwick Post Office (former)
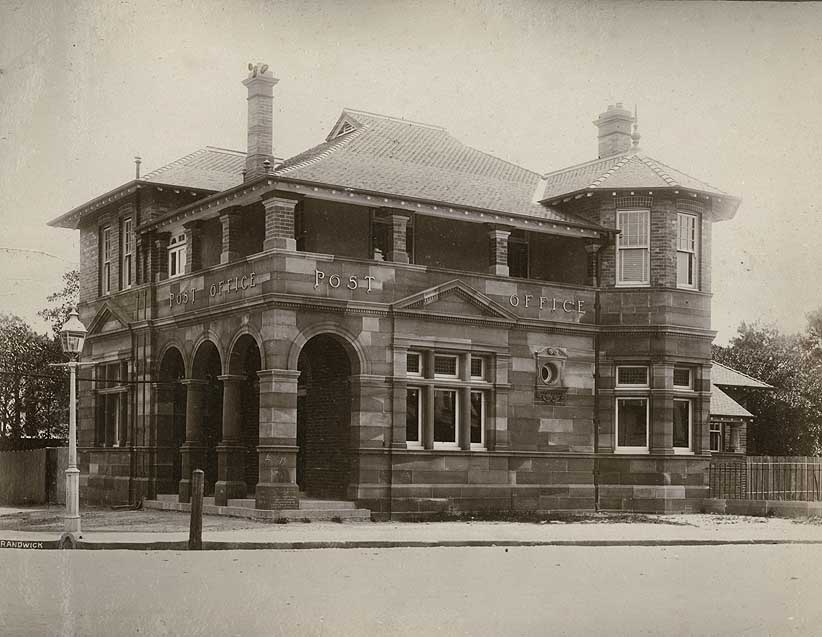
- Randwick Post Office, undated

- Location within Sydney Location within Australia
- 33°54′46″S 151°14′31″E
- Location: 206a Alison Road, Randwick, City of Randwick, New South Wales, Australia

History
- Built: 1897–1898

Site notes
- Architect: Walter Liberty Vernon (NSW Government Architect)
- Architectural style: Federation Free Classical
- Owner: Australia Post

New South Wales Heritage Register
- Official name: Randwick Post Office (former) and Jubilee Fountain
- Type: State heritage (built)
- Designated: 23 June 2000
- Reference no.: 1409
- Type: Post Office
- Category: Postal and Telecommunications
- Builders: W. B. Chessell

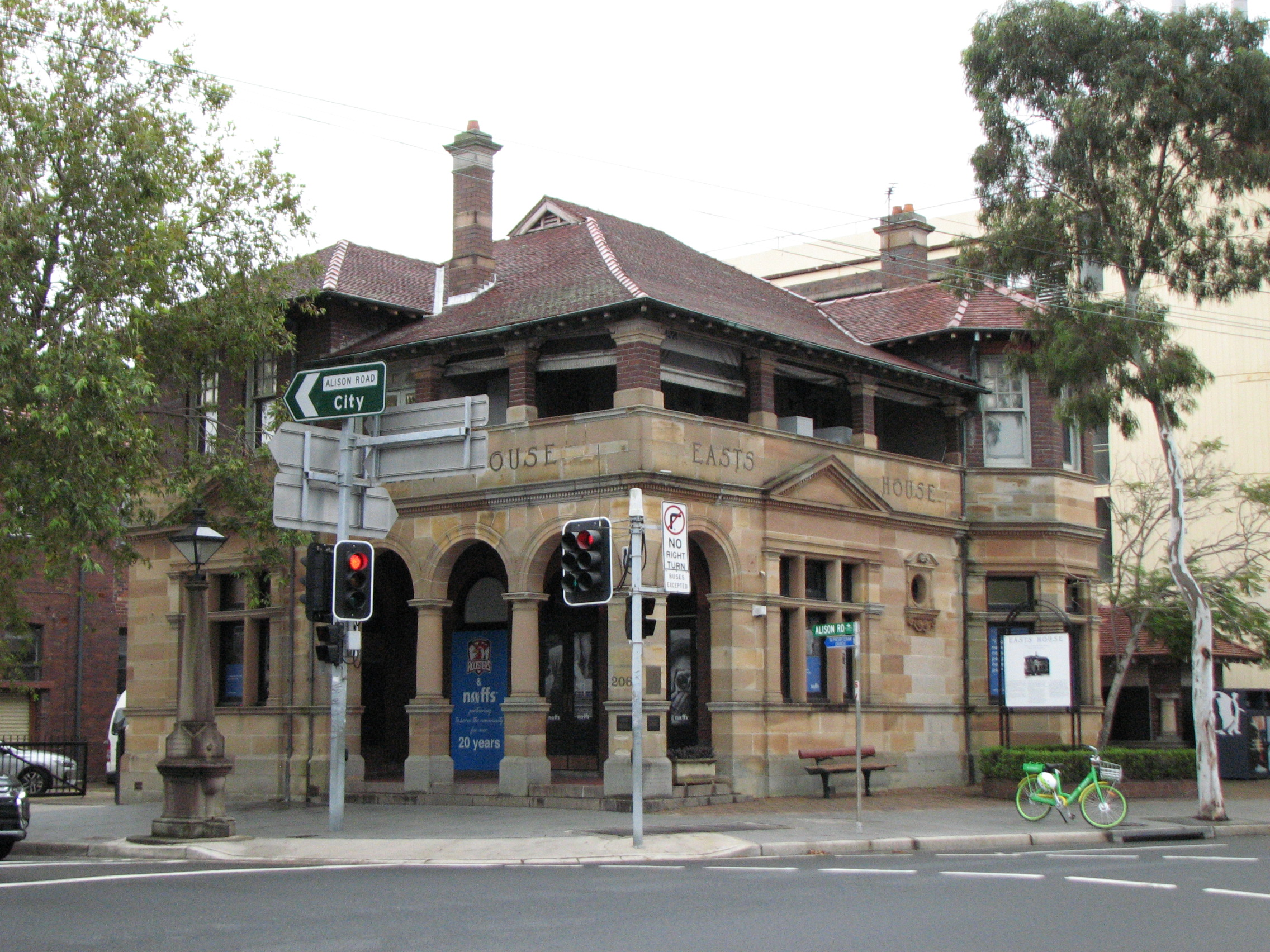
The Former Randwick Post Office

The Randwick Post Office is a heritage-listed former post office located at 124 Alison Road in the Sydney suburb of Randwick in the City of Randwick local government area of New South Wales, Australia. The former post office was designed by Walter Liberty Vernon in his capacity as NSW Government Architect and was built from 1897 to 1898 by W. B. Chessell. It is also known as Randwick Post Office (former) and Jubilee Fountain. The property is owned by Australia Post (Federal Government). It was added to the New South Wales State Heritage Register on 23 June 2000.

== History ==
=== Indigenous history ===
Pre-1780s the local Aboriginal people in the area used the site for fishing and cultural activities – rock engravings, grinding grooves and middens remain in evidence. In 1789 Governor Arthur Phillip referred to "a long bay", which became known as Long Bay. Aboriginal people are believed to have inhabited the Sydney region for at least 20,000 years. The population of Aboriginal people between Palm Beach and Botany Bay in 1788 has been estimated to have been 1500. Those living south of Port Jackson to Botany Bay were the Cadigal people who spoke Dharug, while the local clan name of Maroubra people was "Muru-ora-dial". By the mid nineteenth century the traditional owners of this land had typically either moved inland in search of food and shelter, or had died as the result of European disease or confrontation with British colonisers.

=== Colonial history ===
One of the earliest land grants in this area was made in 1824 to Captain Francis Marsh, who received 4.9 hectares (12 acres) bounded by the present Botany and High Streets, Alison and Belmore Roads. In 1839 William Newcombe acquired the land north-west of the present town hall in Avoca Street.

Randwick takes its name from the town of Randwick, Gloucestershire, England. The name was suggested by Simeon Pearce (1821–86) and his brother James. Simeon was born in the English Randwick and the brothers were responsible for the early development of both Randwick and its neighbour, Coogee. Simeon had come to the colony in 1841as a 21 year old surveyor. He built his Blenheim House on the 1.6 hectares (4 acres) he bought from Marsh, and called his property "Randwick". The brothers bought and sold land profitably in the area and elsewhere. Simeon campaigned for construction of a road from the city to Coogee (achieved in 1853) and promoted the incorporation of the suburb. Pearce sought construction of a church modelled on the church of St. John in his birthplace. In 1857 the first St Jude's stood on the site of the present post office, at the corner of the present Alison Road and Avoca Street.

Randwick was slow to progress. The village was isolated from Sydney by swamps and sandhills, and although a horse-drawn omnibus was operated by a man named Grice from the late 1850s, the journey was more a test of nerves than a pleasure jaunt. Wind blew sand over the track, and the bus sometimes became bogged, so that passengers had to get out and push it free. From its early days Randwick had a divided society. The wealthy lived elegantly in large houses built when Pearce promoted Randwick and Coogee as a fashionable area. But the market gardens, orchards and piggeries that continued alongside the large estates were the lot of the working class. Even on the later estates that became racing empires, many jockeys and stablehands lived in huts or even under canvas. An even poorer group were the immigrants who existed on the periphery of Randwick in a place called Irishtown, in the area now known as The Spot, around the junction of St.Paul's Street and Perouse Road. Here families lived in makeshift houses, taking on the most menial tasks in their struggle to survive.

In 1858 when the NSW Government passed the Municipalities Act, enabling formation of municipal districts empowered to collect rates and borrow money to improve their suburb, Randwick was the first suburb to apply for the status of a municipality. It was approved in February 1859, and its first Council was elected in March 1859.

=== Establishment of a post office ===
In April 1859 a number of residents of Randwick petitioned the Postmaster General for the opening of the mail service to the locality and establishment of a post office in Randwick. Thus, the first mail service to Randwick began in 1859, with a local store owner, John Grice, acting as the postmaster from his store and inn in Avoca Street.

In April 1887 Randwick Municipal Council decided to apply to have a purpose-built post office erected in Randwick. Following inspection of a number of sites, a portion of Church Land at the corner of Alison Road and Avoca Street was secured at a cost of £30 per square foot. The land was resumed in April 1891, with a total cost of £4,137 being paid. Tenders for construction of the building were called for in 1897, and WB Chessell was the successful tenderer. Work then began to a design by Walter Liberty Vernon, the New South Wales Government Architect. The Federation Free Classical style office was opened on 23 March 1898. The new building comprised a general office and vestibule occupying 38 ft by 37 ft, which included a postmaster's room and a telephone room. The postmaster's private residence comprised two living rooms, five bedrooms and a bathroom.

== Description ==
Randwick Post Office is a two-storey dark red double brick building of stretcher bond construction, in Free Classical style, with tuck pointed ashlar sandstone facing to street facades up to first floor balustrade level.

It has a predominantly hipped, complex terracotta shingled roof, fanned over the eastern faceted bay, with a crowning louvred gablet at the centre. Two brick and sandstone chimneys with terracotta pots penetrate at the north and south sides of the main building, with a third to the northern single-storey section.

There are pediments over the south and east stone mullioned windows on the ground floor, with an arcade to Alison Road and a continuous dentilled string course running through the pediment base level. There is scroll detailing below the leadlight oculus to the eastern facade and downpipes have been chased into the sandstone to the southern facade. Some segments of the pediment to the south facade have been replaced.

The roofline, with shaped rafter ends continues over the first-floor balcony, which is partially enclosed at the western end of the south side. The balcony roof is supported by squat brick and sandstone pillars, the walls have been rough cast rendered and painted cream and it has a bituminous floor covering.

=== Condition ===
As at 22 June 2000, The Post Office is in generally good condition and appears largely structurally intact.

The Randwick Post Office appears largely structurally intact, and retains the features which make it culturally significant including architectural features such as the asymmetry of the exterior, the classical colonnade and strongly contrasted materials, textures and colours, along with the prominence of the building in the streetscape.

=== Modifications and dates ===
Major changes include:

- The c. 1920s addition of the post office boxes to the northern side of the building, including the removal of original wall fabric
- The addition of the men's bathroom to the second floor
- The addition of the ladies bathroom to the ground floor north west corner
- Infill of the west end of the southern side of the upper balcony for the current storeroom
- Removal of an earlier structure to the western end of the arcade at ground floor level (possibly earlier postal boxes)
- Construction of the centre stud walls to the ground floor retail space
- The construction of the linking bridge at the first floor with removal of wall fabric
- Installation of internal timber and glass partitions to the ground and upper floors and subsequent reconfiguration of these spaces
- Brick infill of the fireplaces
- Removal and infill of doorway to ground floor eastern façade below oculus and removal of Post Office signage.

=== Further information ===
There is an intrusive Telstra building adjacent to the northern façade of the Randwick Post Office.

== Heritage listing ==
As at 22 June 2000, Randwick Post Office is significant at a State level for its historical associations, strong aesthetic qualities and social value.

Randwick Post Office is historically significant because it is associated with the NSW Government Architect Walter Liberty Vernon, and is part of an important group of works by Vernon, a key practitioner of the Federation Free style. Randwick Post Office is also associated with the pattern of subdivision and the development of communications services in the Randwick area.

Randwick Post Office is aesthetically significant because it is a fine example of the Federation Free style, with strong visual appeal. It is located on a prominent corner site and makes a significant contribution to the streetscape of the Randwick civic precinct.

Randwick Post Office is also considered to be significant to the community of Randwick's sense of place.

Randwick Post Office was listed on the New South Wales State Heritage Register on 23 June 2000 having satisfied the following criteria.

The place is important in demonstrating the course, or pattern, of cultural or natural history in New South Wales.

Randwick Post Office is historically significant because it is associated with the development of communications services in Randwick during the late nineteenth century, as the growing population required improved services. Randwick Post Office also provides evidence of the changing nature of postal and telecommunications practices in NSW.

Built on Church Land, the building is also associated with the pattern of subdivision and development of the Randwick area.

The place is important in demonstrating aesthetic characteristics and/or a high degree of creative or technical achievement in New South Wales.

Randwick Post Office is aesthetically significant because it is a fine example of the Federation Free Style, designed by Vernon, with strong visual appeal.

The architectural style and prominent location of the post office also make it a focal point of the Randwick civic precinct, endowing it with landmark qualities.

The place has a strong or special association with a particular community or cultural group in New South Wales for social, cultural or spiritual reasons.

As a prominent civic building, Randwick Post Office is considered to be significant to the community of Randwick's sense of place.

The place has potential to yield information that will contribute to an understanding of the cultural or natural history of New South Wales.

The site has some potential to contain an archaeological resource, which may provide information relating to the previous Church use of the site and use associated with the Post Office.

The place possesses uncommon, rare or endangered aspects of the cultural or natural history of New South Wales.

Randwick Post Office is a particularly fine example of the work of the NSW Government Architect W.L. Vernon.

The place is important in demonstrating the principal characteristics of a class of cultural or natural places/environments in New South Wales.

Randwick Post Office demonstrates the principle characteristics of the group of post offices constructed in the late nineteenth century in NSW by the Government Architect's Office.

Randwick Post Office is a strong example of the Federation Free style of architecture. It is also part of an important group of works by Government Architect Walter Liberty Vernon.

== See also ==
- Australian non-residential architectural styles
- Media related to Former Randwick Post Office at Wikimedia Commons
