= Randwick City Council =

- Local government area
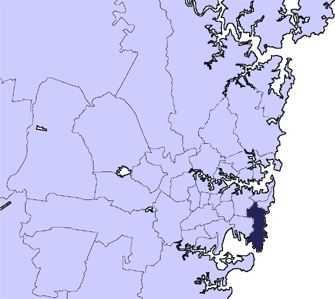
- Location in Metropolitan Sydney

- Interactive map of Randwick City Council
- Coordinates: 33°55′S 151°15′E
- Country: Australia
- State: New South Wales
- Region: South-Eastern Suburbs
- Established: 23 February 1859
- Council seat: Randwick Town Hall

Government
  - Mayor: Clare Willington
  - State electorates: Coogee; Maroubra; Heffron
  - Federal divisions: Kingsford Smith; Wentworth

Area
  - Total: 36 km^{2} (14 sq mi)

Population
  - Totals: 134,252 (2021 census); 141,840 (2023 est.)
  - Density: 3,730/km^{2} (9,660/sq mi)
- Website: Randwick City Council
LGAs around Randwick City Council
Sydney	Waverley	Waverley
Bayside	Randwick City Council	Tasman Sea
Sutherland	Sutherland	Tasman Sea

Randwick City Council is a local government area in the South-Eastern Suburbs of Sydney, New South Wales, Australia. Randwick is the second-oldest local government area in New South Wales after the City of Sydney being established by proclamation in the New South Wales Government Gazette on 23 February 1859 as the Municipality of Randwick. It comprises an area of 36 square kilometres (14 sq mi) and as per the 2021 census had a population of 134,252.

The mayor of the City of Randwick is Clare Willington, a member of the Australian Greens, who was appointed on 29 September 2026.

== Suburbs and localities in the local government area ==
Suburbs and localities in the City of Randwick are:

- Centennial Park (most is located in City of Sydney council)
- Chifley
- Clovelly (minor part located in Waverley Council)
- Coogee
- Coogee Beach
- Kensington
- Kingsford
- La Perouse
- Little Bay
- Malabar
- Maroubra
- Maroubra Junction
- Matraville (minor part located in Bayside Council)
- Pagewood (most is located in Bayside Council)
- Phillip Bay
- Port Botany
- Randwick
- South Coogee
- University of New South Wales

These localities are also serviced by Randwick Council:

- The Spot
- Maroubra Beach
- Clovelly Beach

== History ==
The City of Randwick was first proclaimed the Municipality of Randwick on 23 February 1859 in the New South Wales Government Gazette and under the provisions of the Municipalities Act 1858. The municipality was officially proclaimed the City of Randwick with effect from 1 July 1990 by the Governor of New South Wales, Rear Admiral Sir David Martin on 27 June 1990.

The New South Wales University of Technology opened at Kensington in 1949 on the site of Kensington Racecourse, eventually becoming the University of New South Wales. The Randwick City Library service began in 1952, the municipality being one of the earliest to adopt the Library Act 1939. The city is home to the Malabar Wastewater Treatment Plant, which was opened in 1975, and is one of the largest wastewater treatment facilities in Sydney.

As of 2024, the majority of Council's drainage network was built in the 1950s and 1960s.

A 2015 review of local government boundaries recommended that the City of Randwick merge with the Waverley and Woollahra councils to form a new council with an area of 58 square kilometres (22 sq mi) and support a population of approximately 274,000. Following an independent review, in May 2016 the NSW Government sought to dismiss the council and force its amalgamation with Woollahra and Waverley councils. Woollahra Council instigated legal action claiming that there was procedural unfairness and that a KPMG report at the centre of merger proposals had been "misleading". The matter was heard before the NSW Court of Appeal who, in December 2016, unanimously dismissed Woollahra Council's appeal, finding no merit in its arguments that the proposed merger with Waverley and Randwick councils was invalid. In July 2017, the Berejiklian government decided to abandon the forced merger of the Woollahra, Waverley and Randwick local government areas, along with several other proposed forced mergers.

=== Town Clerks and General Managers ===
Name	Term	Notes
George Edson	1858 – 1862	
Henry Hamburger	1863 – 1 April 1868	
Edwin T. Sayers	1 April 1868 – 3 August 1870	
Joseph Carroll	3 August 1870 – 7 November 1871	
William Charles Norris	7 November 1871 – 18 July 1872	
George Bond Gough	18 July 1872 – December 1875	
James Edwin Graham	1 January 1876 – 6 February 1878	
William Bethune	6 February 1878 – 21 October 1885	
Cecil William Edward Bedford	21 October 1885 – 20 April 1898	
Ernest Henry Strachan	27 April 1898 – January 1912	
William Kirby Percival	8 February 1912 – 25 June 1937	
Harry C. Rourke	25 June 1937 – 15 November 1938	
Richard Thomas Latham	15 November 1938 – 1963	
R. A. Woodward	1963–1982	
Geoff J. Rose	1982–1991	
A. V. Burgess	1991–1997	
Gordon Messiter	1997 – July 2004	
Ray Brownlee	2004 – 28 September 2018	
Therese Manns	1 November 2018 – 10 October 2022	
Kerry Kyriacou (Acting)	10 October 2022 – March 2023	
Ray Brownlee PSM	March 2023 – present	

== Demographics ==
At the 2016 census, there were 140,660 people in the Randwick local government area, of these 49.2% were male and 50.8% were female. Aboriginal and Torres Strait Islander people made up 1.5% of the population; significantly below the NSW and Australian averages of 2.9 and 2.8 per cent respectively. The median age of people in the City of Randwick was 34 years. Children aged 0–14 years made up 14.9% of the population and people aged 65 years and over made up 13.4% of the population. Of people in the area aged 15 years and over, 38.5% were married and 9.1% were either divorced or separated.

Population growth in the City of Randwick between the 2001 Census and the 2006 census was 1.10%; and in the subsequent five years to the 2011 census, population growth was 7.59%. When compared with total population growth of Australia for the same periods, being 5.78% and 8.32% respectively, population growth in Randwick local government area was lower than the national average. The median weekly income for residents within the City of Randwick was higher than the national average.

Selected historical census data for Randwick local government area
Census year		2001	2006	2011	2016
Population	Estimated residents on census night	118,580	119,884	128,989	140,660
Population	LGA rank in terms of size within New South Wales		19th		
Population	% of New South Wales population		1.90%	▼1.86%	▲1.88%
Population	% of Australian population	0.63%	▼0.60%	0.60%	0.60%
Population	Estimated ATSI population on census night	1,351	1,474	1,842	2,144
Population	% of ATSI population to residents	1.1%	▲1.2%	▲1.4%	▲1.5%
Cultural and language diversity					
Ancestry, top responses	Australian			17.5%	▼15.3%
Ancestry, top responses	English			18.5%	18.5%
Ancestry, top responses	Chinese			9.4%	▲10.9%
Ancestry, top responses	Irish			9.2%	▲9.8%
Ancestry, top responses	Scottish			4.9%	▲5.0%
Language, top responses (other than English)	Mandarin	2.7%	▲3.5%	▲4.8%	▲7.2%
Language, top responses (other than English)	Greek	4.8%	▼4.3%	▼3.8%	▼3.2%
Language, top responses (other than English)	Cantonese	4.2%	▼3.8%	▼3.4%	▼3.0%
Language, top responses (other than English)	Indonesian	2.6%	▼2.0%	▼1.9%	▼1.6%
Language, top responses (other than English)	Spanish	n/c	n/c	▲1.5%	▲1.6%
Religious affiliation					
Religious affiliation, top responses	Catholic	31.6%	▼30.2%	▼29.4%	▼26.5%
Religious affiliation, top responses	No religion	14.6%	▲17.5%	▲22.3%	▲31.5%
Religious affiliation, top responses	Anglican	15.6%	▼14.0%	▼12.4%	▼8.9%
Religious affiliation, top responses	Eastern Orthodox	7.3%	▼7.1%	▼6.5%	▼5.4%
Religious affiliation, top responses	Judaism	n/c	▲3.6%	▲4.2%	n/c
Median weekly incomes					
Personal income	Median weekly personal income		A$593	A$718	A$834
Personal income	% of Australian median income		127.3%	▼124.4%	▲126.0%
Family income	Median weekly family income		A$1,185	A$2,066	A$2,421
Family income	% of Australian median income		115.4%	▲139.5%	▲139.6%
Household income	Median weekly household income		A$1,579	A$1,577	A$1,916
Household income	% of Australian median income		134.8%	▼127.8%	▲133.2%
Dwelling structure					
Dwelling type	Separate house	30.2%	▲32.3%	▼30.6%	▼26.4%
Dwelling type	Semi-detached, terrace or townhouse	15.8%	▼14.7%	▲15.6%	▲16.5%
Dwelling type	Flat or apartment	51.7%	▲52.1%	▲53.3%	▲55.8%

== Council ==
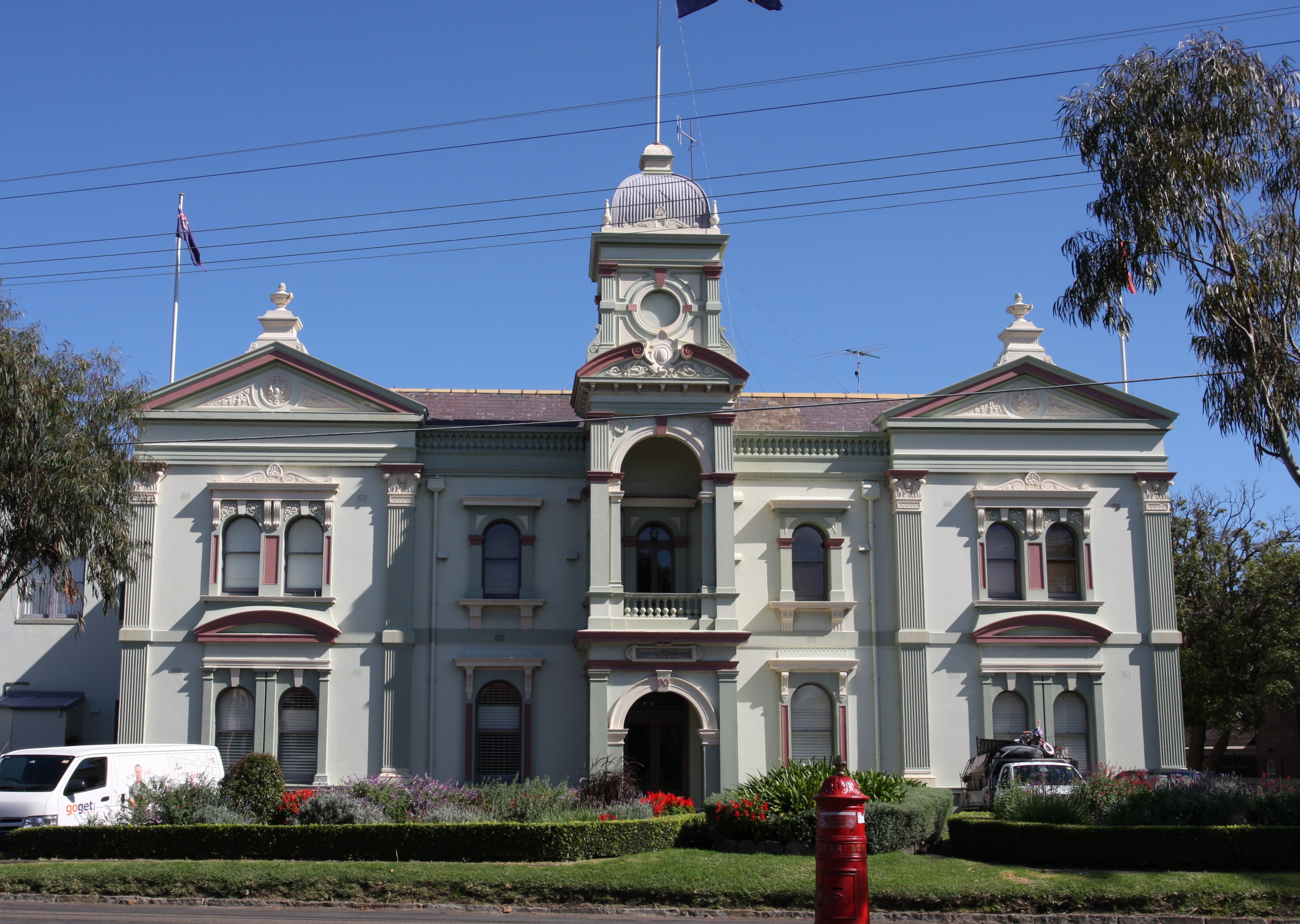
Randwick Town Hall, designed in the Italianate style by Sydney architects Blackman and Parkes, has been the seat of the council since 1886.

Mayor		Term	Notes
Mayor	Clare Willington	29 September 2026 – present	
Deputy Mayor	Masoomeh Asgari	29 September 2026 – present	
General Manager		Term	Notes
Ray Brownlee		March 2023 – present	

=== Current composition and election method ===
Randwick City Council is composed of fifteen councillors elected proportionally as five separate wards, each electing three councillors. All councillors are elected for a fixed four-year term of office. The mayor is elected for a two-year term, with the deputy mayor for one year, by the councillors at the first meeting of the council. The most recent election was held on 14 September 2024, and the makeup of the council is as follows:

Party	Councillors
Australian Labor Party	6
Liberal Party of Australia	5
The Greens	3
Independent	1
Total	15

The current Council, elected in 2024, in order of election by ward, is:

Ward	Councillor	Party	Notes
Central Ward	Daniel Rosenfeld	Liberal	
Central Ward	Dylan Parker	Labor	Elected 2017; Mayor 2021–2023; Mayor 2024-2026
Central Ward	Dexter Gordon	Labor	
East Ward	Marea Wilson	Labor	Deputy Mayor 2024-2026
East Ward	Masoomeh Asgari	Greens	Deputy Mayor 2026-
East Ward	Carolyn Martin	Liberal	
North Ward	Clare Willington	Greens	Mayor 2026-
North Ward	Christie Hamilton	Liberal	Elected 2017.
North Ward	Aaron Magner	Labor	
South Ward	Noel D'Souza	Independent	Elected 2012; Mayor 2015–2017; Deputy Mayor 2012–2013.
South Ward	Danny Said	Labor	Elected 2017; Deputy Mayor 2018–2019; Mayor 2019–2021.
South Ward	Bill Burst	Liberal	
West Ward	Alexandra Luxford	Labor	Elected 2017; Deputy Mayor 2017–2018, 2023–2024.
West Ward	Andrew Hay	Liberal	
West Ward	Philipa Veitch	Greens	Elected 2017; Deputy Mayor 2019–2021; Mayor 2023–2024.

== Election results ==
=== 2024 ===
2024 New South Wales local elections: Randwick
Party	Votes	%	Swing	Seats	Change
Labor	24,480	36.12%	+5.12%	6	▲1
Liberal	24,269	35.81%	+9.31%	5	Steady
Greens	13,909	20.52%	–0.88%	3	▼1
Independents	4,934	7.28%	–6.11%	1	Steady
Formal votes	67,772	95.94%			
Informal votes	2,754	4.06%			
Total	70,526			15	

== Heritage listings ==
The City of Randwick has a number of heritage-listed sites, including those listed under the New South Wales Heritage Register:

- Centennial Park, 3R Oxford Street: Centennial Park Reservoir
- Centennial Park, 5R Oxford Street: Woollahra Reservoir
- Coogee, 45-51 Beach Street: Cliffbrook
- Coogee, Grant Reserve: McIver Women's Baths
- Coogee, 4b Neptune Street: Wylie's Baths
- Kensington, 85 Todman Avenue: Carthona (Kensington)
- La Perouse, Bare Island Fort
- La Perouse, 46 Adina Avenue: La Perouse Mission Church
- La Perouse, 1-39 Bunnerong Road: Chinese Market Gardens (La Perouse)
- Little Bay, 1430 Anzac Parade: Prince Henry Site
- Malabar, 1250 Anzac Parade: Long Bay Correctional Centre
- Malabar, Franklin Street: Malabar Headland
- Randwick, Centennial Park, Moore Park, Queens Park
- Randwick, 124 Alison Road: Randwick Post Office
- Randwick, 162 Alison Road: Randwick Presbyterian Church
- Randwick, 102-108 Avoca Street: St Jude's Church, Randwick
- Randwick, 211-215 Avoca Street: Corana and Hygeia
- Randwick, 128 Belmore Road: Sandgate (Randwick)
- Randwick, 60 Bundock Lane: Electricity Substation No. 341
- Randwick, 66 Frenchmans Road: Venice (Randwick)
- Randwick, 17 Gilderthorpe Avenue: Hooper Cottage
- Randwick, 16-18 Milford Street: Nugal Hall
- Randwick, 2S Frances Street: Electricity Substation No. 349
- Randwick, 43 St Marks Road: Rathven (Randwick)
- Randwick, 43 St Pauls Street: Ritz Cinema, Sydney
- Randwick, 18-20 Stanley Street: Emanuel School, Australia
- Randwick, 26-42 The Avenue: Avonmore Terrace
- Randwick, 29-39 Young Street: Big Stable Newmarket

=== Heritage and local character restrictions ===
On June 30, 2026, Randwick Council voted to introduce "local character areas" covering the full LGA in stage 2 of the Development Control Plan. Common issues raised during consultation were the subjectivity of "local character" provisions, so in response to community feedback they were "strengthened".
