= Avonmore Terrace =

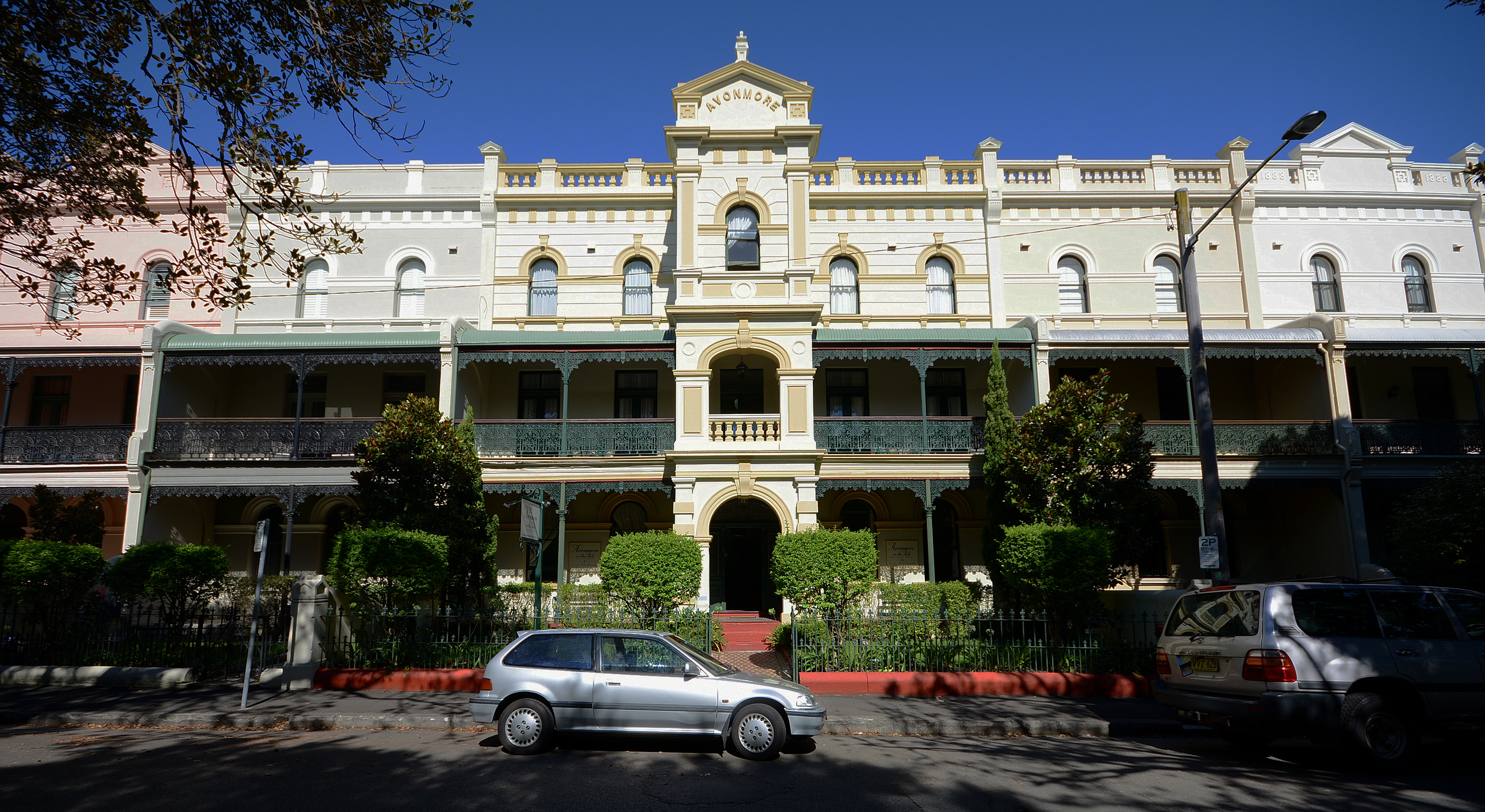
- Avonmore, Randwick, pictured in 2015

- Location within Sydney Location within Australia
- 33°54′45″S 151°14′29″E
- Location: 26–42 The Avenue, Randwick, City of Randwick, New South Wales, Australia

History
- Built: 1888–1891

Site notes
- Architectural style: Victorian Italianate

New South Wales Heritage Register
- Official name: Avonmore Terrace; Randwick Mansions
- Type: State heritage (built)
- Designated: 2 April 1999
- Reference no.: 565
- Type: Terrace
- Category: Residential buildings (private)
- Builders: John Walsh

Avonmore Terrace is a heritage-listed row of terrace houses at 26–42 The Avenue, in the Sydney suburb of Randwick, New South Wales, Australia. The terrace houses were built from 1888 to 1891 by John Walsh. It is also known as Randwick Mansions. The property is privately owned. It was added to the New South Wales State Heritage Register on 2 April 1999. As of 2007, the terrace houses are predominately used as domestic housing, with one of the terraces used as a boutique hotel.

== History ==
The site was originally part of an 1864 land grant to the Church of England, most of which was used for St. Judes Church Cemetery on the west side of the Church and Municipal Council Chambers on Frenchmans Road (now Avoca Street) and bordering Frances Street and Johns Lane (renamed The Avenue in 1895). The land grant comprised three acres, three roods, and thirty seven perches, which is approximately 1.6 hectares.

The 1864 map shows the present attractive park opposite the terrace was offered to five other denominations to provide a Cemetery for Wesleyans, Independents, Jews, other denominations, and the largest sections for Roman Catholics and Presbyterians. The land was not taken up by those religious bodies within the required time and was consequently resumed by the Government to be used as a cricket ground.

In June 1886 a Select Committee of the NSW Legislative Assembly was set up to consider and report on the "Randwick Cemetery Unused Lands Sale Bill" and determine if there were any bodies buried in the unused section of the land proposed for sale by the Trustees of St. Jude's Church, and secondly to enquire as to what purposes the money from this sale would be put to. In 1868 an Act was passed prohibiting any more burials at Randwick except in the fenced Cemetery ground already taken up. Residents had expressed concern about pollution of the water supply from the Cemetery.

Witnesses called included Geo. Bishop, a Surveyor and the Rev. W. Hough incumbent of St. Jude's, as well as one of the Cemetery Trustees and the Caretaker. They all agreed that there were no bodies left in the proposed section; as the remains of two infants and one adult had been removed two years before. The witnesses also agreed that money realised from such a sale would be spent on enlarging the Church; providing suitable accommodation for the caretaker; plus funds to keep the Cemetery in better order, and to give a grant towards erecting a new Church in Coogee. It was expected that about $6,000 would be raised as local land values at that time were between $36 and $32 per foot (0.304 m.)

In May 1888 the Church sold off an area of one acre, one rood and one and a half perches – approximately .510 of a hectare to John Walsh.

The first of the terraces to be built was the middle terrace - the largest of the nine terraces. It was built by John Walsh, a building contractor, as his own family home. It was commenced after May 1888, he then continued building the adjoining terraces. Which were completed by February 1891 with tenants in all but No. 8 according to the Randwick Rate books. The 1889 Randwick Rate records as at February are marked no residents. However Rates were charged to J. Walsh on Nos. 1 to 9, marked "Houses". They were Valued at $280 each for the eight smaller terraces and $320 for No. 5 - "Avonmore". Rates paid were $12.20 each for the 8, and $14.40 for "Avonmore". In 1890 Rate records show 3 residents - "John Walsh, Contractor, "Avonmore" - in No. 5 (now No. 34), No. 1 - Mr. Thompson and in No. 8 - James Angus - tenants.

John Walsh was a successful Building and Railway Contractor who was born in County Galway, Ireland in 1843. He built railways in Queensland. In 1867 John married Margaret Jane Clohesy from Kilkenny, Ireland, at Brisbane. She was 22. Walsh built the Goulburn to Cooma Railway and apparently made enough money by 1888 to build the nine three storey terraces. John's wife Margaret produced six daughters in the twenty years up to 1888, consequently they needed a large residence with a bedroom for each girl, guests bedrooms, and servants quarters. It has been speculated that the large reception rooms on the ground floor were used for entertaining the local important families, and showing off the eligible daughters. "Avonmore" has about 16 rooms.

In 1891 the Rate Books show some early citizens of note in Walsh's Terrace. From the south end:

- No. 1 Alfred Drake
- No. 2 David Storey, a merchant and later Sir David, and the first Member for Randwick
- No. 3 James Angus
- No. 4 M. A. Dalley
- No. 5 John Walsh, Builder and Railway Contractor
- No. 6 Rev. J. Campbell was an Anglican church militant who published a book – "Gold and how to get it or, One solution of the Unemployment Problem". He was Curate at St. Nicolas Church, Coogee, and preached a series of sermons on the "Difficulties of Belief". He received a gold medal from the University of Sydney for Geology and Agricultural Chemistry.
- No. 7 Robert Beeston
- No. 8 Vacant
- No. 9 A. T. Bolton. He built a large house Stratheden on corner of Belmore Road and High Street, Randwick and then moved into it on completion.

House names first appear in 1892 for Walsh's Terrace in Johns Avenue, as listed in "Sands Directory". It is unknown whether John Walsh chose the names for his rented terraces.

- "Etruria" – James Angus No. 2
- "Wattsbridge" – David Storey in No. 3
- "Eurotas" – F. Foy
- "Avonmore" – J. Walsh No. 5
- "Laleham" – Rev. J. Campbell (Church of England)
- "Kylemore" – No. 9 (in 1893/94) Lewis Moore, son-in-law, resided here with his bride.

John Walsh died on 13 February 1893 aged 50 years and was buried in Waverley Cemetery. His widow, Margaret then moved to No. 2 and continued renting the eight terraces, via the Perpetual Trustees, until 1905 when they were all sold to the Estate of B.O. Holterman. Just prior to the First World War the terrace row was named 'Randwick Mansions.'

From 1903 until 1908 Lotaville Private School for young ladies was conducted at Avonmore by Professor Patrick Henry Hughes, who was born in 1839 in Corfu, and his wife Mary Jane born in 1840. Boarders were also accommodated. High standards were apparently achieved as some pupils obtained university qualifications from Lotaville. From 1909 to c. 1916 Brighton College took over at Avonmore, under Miss Amos and Richard C.Amos. They probably took over the pupils from Lotaville School.

No. 34 is currently run as a boutique hotel. The remaining terraces are all in private ownership.

== Description ==
Avonmore is a group of nine three-storey Victorian Italianate terrace houses of imposing proportions with number 34 being the central and grandest one. It is constructed of load-bearing rendered brick and a timber framer roof.

The central terrace (No. 34) is divided into five bays with a window or door opening in each bay and at each storey. Large tower providing centrepiece for the whole row. The central bay projects in front of the bays on either side and is unique to the central terrace. All of the other terraces in the row have only two bays with bullnose verandahs.

The facade has a heavy balustraded parapet except at the central bay which has a broken pediment surmounted by an urn. The lettering 'AVONMORE" is set in the walling in the pediment. Interior contains carved staircase engraved with family initials, "W" may also be seen in the cornices of various rooms. Stained glass adorns the large front door. Marble and tiled fireplaces. Ornamental ceilings.

Palisade fence. cast iron lace work and elaborate mouldings. Some original tiled verandas and pathways.

=== Condition ===
As at 22 September 2011, the physical condition is good.

== Heritage listing ==
As at 22 September 2011, Avonmore is a group of nine Italianate terrace houses of imposing proportions. It was built by John Walsh who completed it in 1888. The row is significant for its Victorian Italianate style façade, its decorative detail and large rooms. Being located opposite Alison Park, it is important for the contribution it makes to the St. Judes Precinct. The elements of the row considered to be of high significance are the entire façade including the central tower and the verandahs with cast iron balustrades and corrugated iron roofs. The interiors (hallways, front rooms, stairs and fireplaces) of some of the houses are of high significance. The row of terraces demonstrates the process of subdivision and development in Randwick in the late 19th century and the wealth and expectations of the period.

Avonmore Terrace was listed on the New South Wales State Heritage Register on 2 April 1999.

== See also ==
- Australian residential architectural styles
