= Electricity Substation No. 341 =

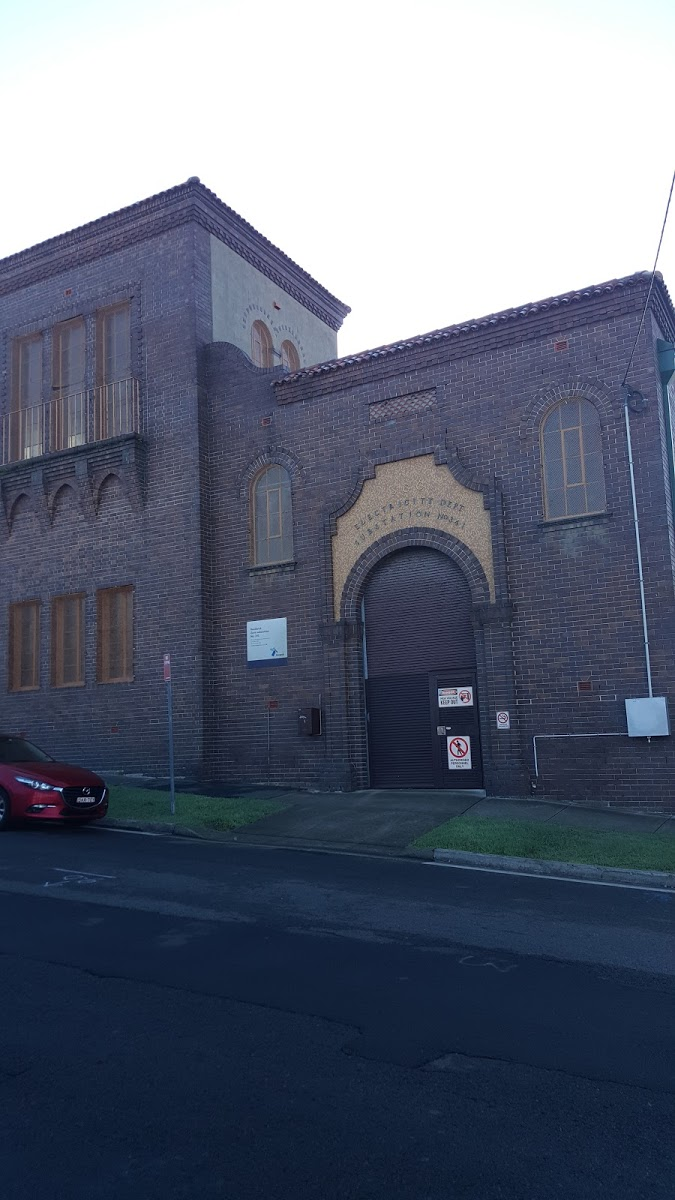

- Location within Sydney Location within Australia
- 33°55′36″S 151°14′37″E
- Location: 60 Bundock Lane, Randwick, City of Randwick, New South Wales, Australia

History
- Built: 1929

Site notes
- Architectural style: Interwar Mediterranean
- Owner: Ausgrid

New South Wales Heritage Register
- Official name: Substation; #341 Randwick 33 kV Zone; Canberra Street substation
- Type: State heritage (built)
- Designated: 2 April 1999
- Reference no.: 935
- Type: Electricity Transformer/Substation
- Category: Utilities – Electricity

The Electricity Substation No. 341 is a heritage-listed Electrical substation at 60 Bundock Lane, Randwick, New South Wales, a suburb of Sydney, Australia. It was built in 1929. It is also known as #341 Randwick 33 kV Zone and Canberra Street substation. The property is owned by Ausgrid, an agency of the Government of New South Wales. The substation was added to the New South Wales State Heritage Register on 2 April 1999.

== Electricity supply ==
The Randwick substation is a purpose designed and built structure constructed in 1930. "The site was resumed in 1929 by the Municipal Council of Sydney and then over by Sydney County Council in 1935, the resumption cost A£2,500. This substation was a major part of the distribution network of the Bunnerong Power station and fed all the smaller substations in the Randwick area. The building was completed in 1930 following a cost blow-out owing to the contractor receiving instructions for a wider building than shown on the original plan and the fact that it was essential to have one half of the building constructed and ready before the other half".

Historical Period: 1926–1950.

== Description ==
The Randwick substation is a large and attractively decorated building that presents a street façade with elaborate brick decoration designed in the Interwar Mediterranean style. The façade is composed of two sections: A two-storey block comprising a high entrance door with lintel arch motifs, and three groupings of triple windows: one group with arches, another with balcony and balusters. The second part of the façade is a symmetrical arrangement with a large arched doorway flanked by pilasters and arch headed windows surmounted by an ornate identity panel. The parapets include curved roof tiles. The Randwick substation is constructed in load-bearingtuck pointed face brick. The windows appear to be metal framed multi-paned. Large plant access doors are steel roller shutter type. The architectural style is Interwar Mediterranean. Exterior materials used were face brick, rounded ceramic roof tiles, and steel roller shutter doors.

=== Condition ===
As at 10 November 2000, the condition of the substation was good.

== Heritage listing ==
As at 15 March 2001, The Randwick substation is a rare, substantial, attractive and well detailed building of state significance, being representative of the interwar Mediterranean style. "Although a major part of the Bunnerong Power Station distribution network, the Sydney Municipal Council was still keen to provide a building worthy of a residential area."

The Electricity Substation No. 341 was listed on the New South Wales State Heritage Register on 2 April 1999.

== See also ==
- Australian non-residential architectural styles
- Ausgrid
