= Randwick Town Hall =

Randwick City Hall
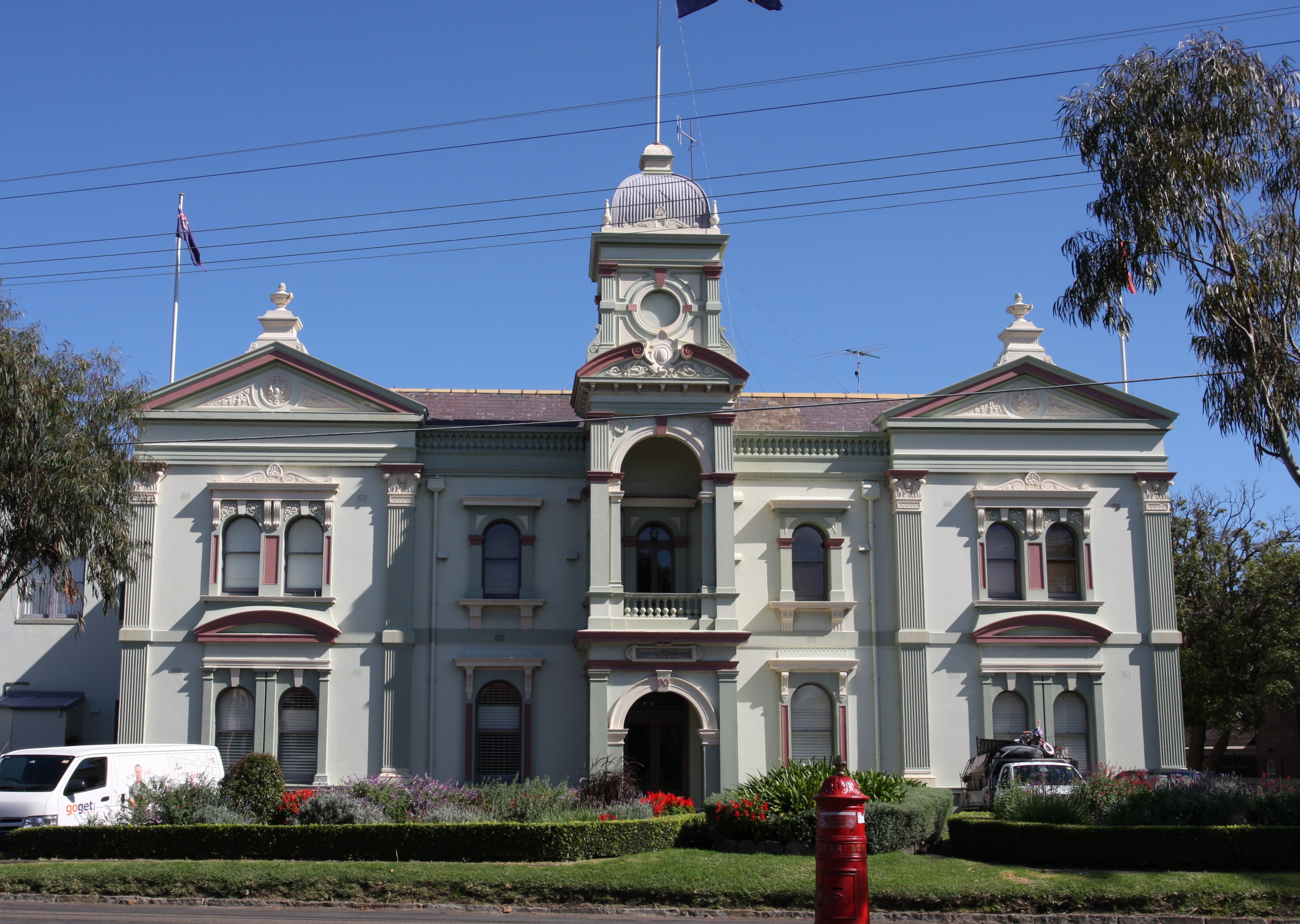

- Location within inner Sydney

General information
- Status: Completed
- Type: Local government town hall
- Architectural style: Victorian Italianate
- Location: 90 Avoca Street, Randwick, Sydney, New South Wales, Australia
- Coordinates: 33°54′41″S 151°14′36″E
- Construction started: 1882
- Opened: 3 February 1882
- Renovated: 1937
- Cost: A£2,300
- Renovation cost: A£10,000
- Owner: City of Randwick (Randwick Shire)

Technical details
- Material: Brick; rendered with stucco and cement
- Floor count: 2

Design and construction
- Architecture firm: Blackmann and Parkes
- Main contractor: G. R. Keats

Other information
- Seating capacity: 220 (seated); 300 (standing)

The Randwick City Hall is a heritage-listed town hall located in the Sydney suburb of Randwick, New South Wales, Australia. Designed by Messrs Blackmann and Parkes in the Victorian Italianate architectural style, the town hall was completed in 1882 at a cost of A£2,300 to serve as the town hall and municipal chamber for the Borough of Randwick.

The City Hall is listed on the (now defunct) Register of the National Estate and as an item of local government significance on the New South Wales Heritage Database.

== See also ==
- List of town halls in Sydney
- Architecture of Sydney
