= Carthona, Kensington =

Carthona
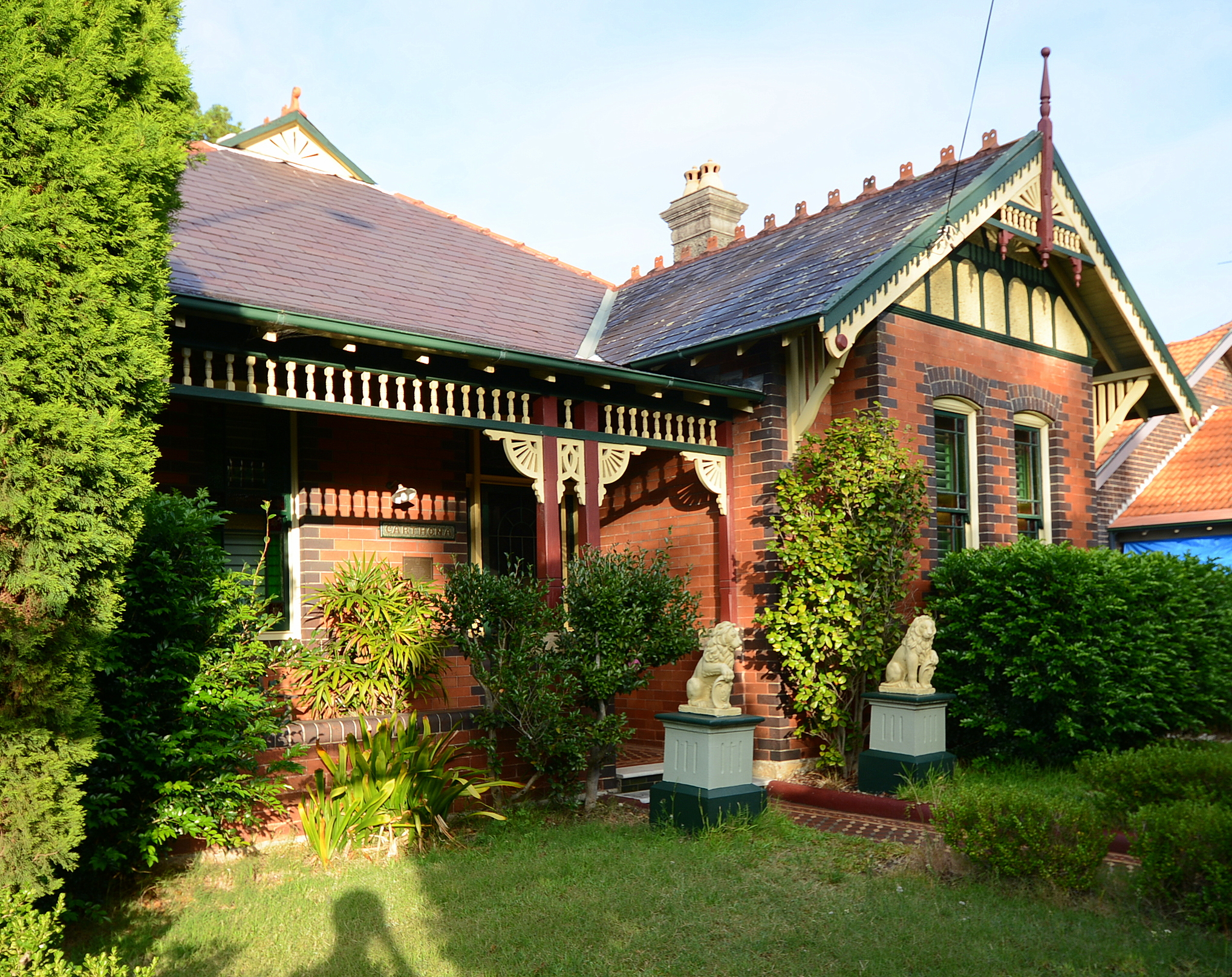
- Carthona, pictured in 2015

- Location within Sydney Location within Australia
- 33°54′31″S 151°13′05″E
- Location: Todman Avenue, Kensington, City of Randwick, New South Wales, Australia

History
- Built: 1910

Site notes
- Architectural style: Federation Queen Anne

New South Wales Heritage Register
- Official name: Carthona
- Type: State heritage (built)
- Designated: 2 April 1999
- Reference no.: 555
- Type: House
- Category: Residential buildings (private)

Carthona is a heritage-listed residence in Kensington, City of Randwick, New South Wales, Australia. It was built in 1910. It was added to the New South Wales State Heritage Register on 2 April 1999.

== History ==
Carthona was constructed in c. 1910 by Mr Frank Gallagher. Up until 1986 the property was in the one family ownership. In January 1986 the Heritage Branch received representations from the National Trust of Australia (NSW) regarding the sale of Carthona at 85 Todman Avenue, Randwick. On 21 February 1986 an Interim Conservation Order was placed over the property to provide time to investigate its significance and to provide heritage management at the time. A Permanent Conservation Order was placed over the property on 19 February 1988. On 2 April 1999 it was transferred to the State Heritage Register.

== Description ==
Carthona is a single-story brick dwelling on a sandstone base. Soundly built the house features dichromatic and tuckpointed brickwork to the front elevation and decorative timber detailing to the verandah and gable end in the Queen Anne manner.

The house features a hipped slate roof with terracotta ridge capping and a gable over the front bedroom. The tall chimneys have all survived and feature roughcast and cement detailing with terracotta chimney pots. The front door, with sidelights and fanlight feature leaded glass. Timber-framed windows are double-hung sash and those in the front elevation feature coloured glass and etched decoration in a star pattern.

The interior of the house retains almost all of its original detailing including fine ornamental plaster ceilings with Australia flora and fauna motifs. Doors, architecture and skirtings are finished in original wood graining. Fireplaces are fine marble (drawing room) and timber with tiled surrounds (bedrooms and dining room). (Heritage Branch files)

=== Condition ===
As at 15 September 2011, the physical condition was good.

=== Modifications and dates ===
- 1986 - removal of early kitchen and bathroom fixtures, extension and enclosure of rear verandah, construction of garage.
- 2009 - extension at rear, addition of rear deck, internal modifications.

== Heritage listing ==
As at 22 September 2011, Carthona is a fine example of the Federation Queen Anne style of architecture. Built c. 1910 for a tradesman plasterer, the house retains almost all its original detail including slate roof with terracotta ridge capping, roughcast and cement chimneys, leaded glass and etched coloured glass windows, ornamental plaster ceilings with Australian flora and fauna motifs and interior joinery with grained timber finish.

Carthona was listed on the New South Wales State Heritage Register on 2 April 1999.

== See also ==
- Australian residential architectural styles
