= Randwick, Gloucestershire =

Village in Gloucestershire, England

Coordinates: 51°46′N 2°15′W

Randwick
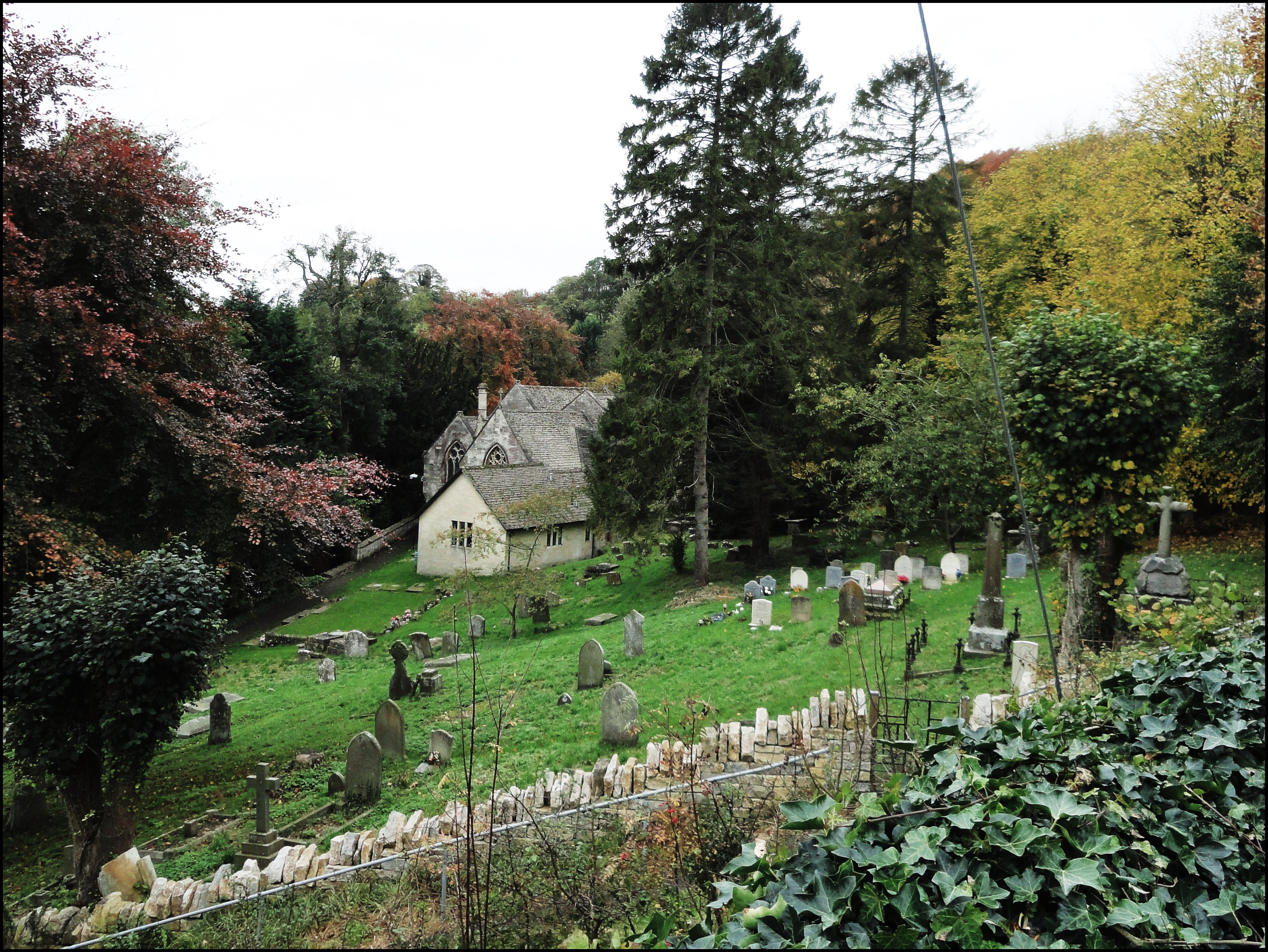
- Randwick's Parish Church and Churchyard

- Location within Gloucestershire
- Population: 1,423 (2011 Census)
- Civil parish: Randwick and Westrip
- District: Stroud
- Shire county: Gloucestershire
- Region: South West
- Country: England
- Sovereign state: United Kingdom
- Post town: Stroud
- Postcode district: GL6
- Police: Gloucestershire
- Fire: Gloucestershire
- Ambulance: South Western
- UK Parliament: Stroud

Randwick is a village in the civil parish of Randwick and Westrip, in the Stroud district, in the county of Gloucestershire, England. It borders the market town of Stroud. It is known locally for its folk traditions such as the Randwick Wap, a celebration of May Day, and its annual pantomime.

== Governance ==
The village falls part of the 'Randwick, Whiteshill and Ruscombe' electoral ward. This ward stretches from Randwick north easterly to Whiteshill. The total ward population at the 2011 census was 1,747.

The civil parish was renamed from "Randwick" to "Randwick and Westrip" on 1 August 2015. Westrip is an outer suburb of Stroud, south of Randwick, which may have been within the parish beforehand. The population at the 2011 census was 1,423.

== Randwick Wap ==
The Wap is an annual series of events during spring which culminates in a traditional procession and festival dating back to the Middle Ages. Various theories exist on how it began, although most villagers believe it was a celebration that followed the completion of building Randwick's parish church.

The Wap was traditionally held on Low Sunday and Monday, the first Sunday and Monday after Easter. On the Sunday, the bells of the village church would be rung, a special service was held and a collection taken. On the Mon evening, a 'Mayor' was elected and he would be carried by chair to an ancient pool where he was immersed. Hordes would gather from far and wide including fiddle-playing and fortune-telling gipsies. By the late 19th century, however, the Wap was becoming better known for its drunken revelry rather than as an ancient spectacle and it was evident that something had to be done. In 1892, the church officials refused to ring the bells or hold a special collection to mark 'Wap Sunday' and although a mayor was elected, the Wap in its then form had run its course.

The Randwick Wap was eventually revived in 1971 by the vicar Rev Niall Morrison (son of William Morrison, 1st Viscount Dunrossil) and now the festivities take place in the month of May.
