= Nugal Hall =

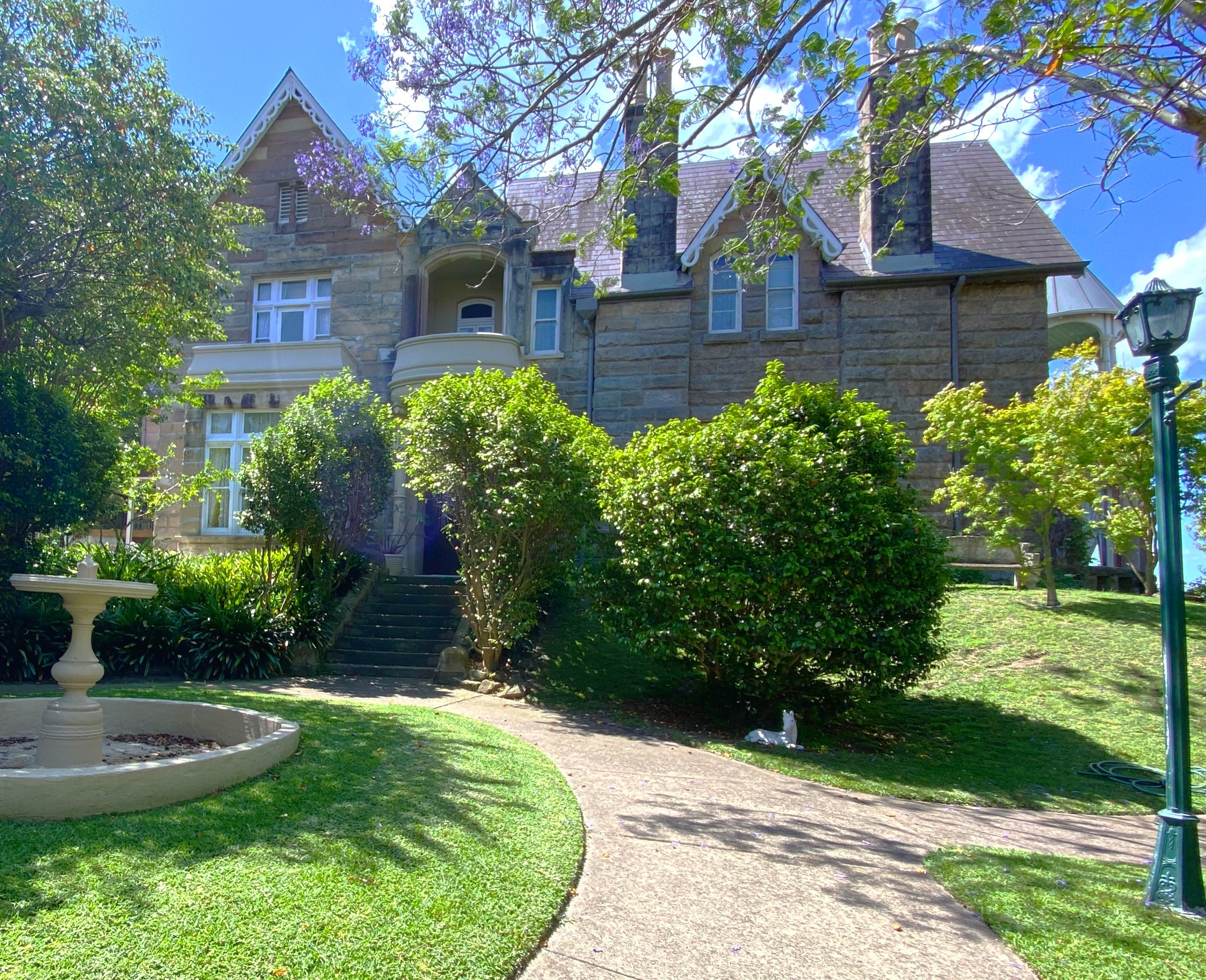
- Nugal Hall in 2021

- Location within inner Sydney
- 33°54′55″S 151°14′36″E
- Location: 16–18 Milford Street, Randwick, City of Randwick, New South Wales, Australia

History
- Built: 1853
- Built for: Alexander McArthur

Site notes
- Elevation: 70 m (230 ft)
- Height: 14 m (46 ft)
- Area: Land 1,827 sqm (34% occupied by buildings). Aggregate building floor area 1,612 sqm
- Architects: Mortimer Lewis (south); Oswald H. Lewis (north)
- Architectural style: Gothic Revival
- Owner: Privately owned

New South Wales Heritage Register
- Official name: Nugal Hall
- Type: State heritage (complex / group)
- Designated: 2 April 1999
- Reference no.: 173
- Type: Mansion
- Category: Residential buildings (private)

Nugal Hall is a heritage-listed Gothic Revival style former private residence, ambassador's residence, boutique lodge, embassy and now private residence located at 16–18 Milford Street, in the Sydney suburb of Randwick on the boundary with the suburb of Coogee. Nugal Hall sits in the City of Randwick local government area as part of the Eastern Suburbs of Sydney in New South Wales, Australia.

Nugal Hall was designed by Mortimer Lewis (south section) and Oswald H. Lewis (north section) and completed in 1853. Nugal Hall was added to the New South Wales State Heritage Register on 2 April 1999 and on the (now defunct) Register of the National Estate. Nugal Hall has had many famous residents including politicians, business magnates, ambassadors, judges/lawyers, and movie stars. The property is privately owned.

== History ==
=== 1851–1853: Land grant and design ===
The land on which Nugal Hall is built was granted to Alexander (Alex) McArthur in Randwick, over the period 1851–1853, by Governor Fitzroy. The land grants to McArthur involved four lots aggregating to some 8.4 hectares (20.7 acres) acquired by private tender on both sides of Avoca Street (then known as Frenchman's Road). McArthur (also spelled as 'MacArthur' (sic) in documents of the time) was likely investing the significant profits he had achieved at that time as a gold exporter and clothing importer in the great Australian gold rushes that started in early 1851. The aggregate cost of the four lots was around £1,300.

The land granted to McArthur in Randwick extended from Judge Street to Belmore Road, and from Alison Road to Mear's Avenue. The land was bordered to the east by a 12.1 hectare (30 acre) block of land in Coogee owned by William Charles Wentworth, one of the leading figures in early colonial New South Wales and the richest man in Sydney at that time. Judge Thomas Callaghan bought a 2.1 hectare (5.2 acre) block to the south. Callaghan was another prominent Colonial figure and one of the first three judges in the Sydney Court of General and Quarter Sessions.

Callaghan described the land at the time as resembling Ireland for its picturesque beauty involving waterfalls and rolling farmland from the top of the Randwick ridge line down to Coogee Beach and the Tasman Sea. Callaghan named his house there as 'Avoca' after the 'Vale of Avoca' from County Wicklow in Ireland. 'Vale' means valley in Gaelic whilst 'Avoca' is said to mean 'meeting of the waters' or 'great river'. A number of streets in the immediate area were named after Judge Callaghan, including Avoca Street, Judge Street, Milford Street, and Ada Street.

Sandstone from the site on which Nugal Hall was located was used in the construction of a number of houses in the immediate vicinity. Most construction was undertaken by ticket of leave men (convicts on parole) under the supervision of Judge Callaghan. Callaghan presumably had an arrangement to use sandstone from the site of Nugal Hall for the construction of his own nearby sandstone residence 'Avoca' which was built at the same time. The stone for Nugal Hall was therefore quarried on the spot and the foundation of Nugal Hall is securely built on rock.

Nugal Hall was designed by the Colonial Architect, Mortimer Lewis who came to Australia and worked from 1830 to 1861. Nugal Hall was one of his last buildings and was designed at the same time that Lewis was designing and building his own Gothic Revival mansion, known as Richmond Villa on the site of the current NSW Parliament buildings (now relocated to Millers Point). Lewis was a prominent architect in Colonial Sydney and involved in the design of many important government buildings, including the NSW Legislative Council Chamber (1843), the Australian Museum (1843), the Customs House on Circular Quay (1845) and the NSW Treasury Building and Premier's Office (1849). Lewis' residential designs included Bronte House (1838).

At the time of its construction during 1851–53, Nugal Hall was designed as a large two-storey Gothic Revival villa interconnected with a single-storey cottage (that echoed the villa in its design). Both buildings were interconnected with a single-storey servants quarters. The cottage and servants quarters were later subsumed within the two-storey northern extension to the house in 1885-87. The residence sat on the top of a Randwick ridge line with a commanding view over the 'Vale of Coogee' to the Tasman Sea.

Other notable Gothic Revival mansions in Sydney's eastern suburbs from the same era include Vaucluse House (Vaucluse, 1839), Carthona (Darling Point, 1841), Bishopscourt (Darling Point, 1849), Swifts (Darling Point, 1877), and Rona (Bellevue Hill, 1883). Notable Gothic Revival buildings of the period include Government House (Sydney Botanic Gardens, 1847) and the impressive main hall and quadrangle of the University of Sydney (Camperdown, 1859) which was the largest public building in Australia at the time.

Milford Street was originally a bridal track and not formally recognised as a street until the 1860s. The driveway to Nugal Hall swept back from Avoca Street (then called Frenchman's Road) around the north side (now the back of Nugal Hall) to the coach house and stables (in what is now Milford Street). Milford Street takes its name from Justice Samuel Frederick Milford (1797-1865), Primary Judge of the Supreme Court in Sydney, who was the father-in-law of Callaghan.

=== 1853–1878: Rockville ===
The southern portion of the house was completed in 1853 to Lewis' design in the Gothic Revival style for politician and businessman Alexander McArthur. Irish-born McArthur arrived in Sydney in 1840 from Derry, Ireland, with his older brother Sir William McArthur KCMG, who subsequently became a Lord Mayor of London and Member of British Parliament. McArthur had intended to stay in Sydney for 6 months to recover from illness, but stayed for 23 years, operating the Australian end of the import-export partnership 'W&A McArthur Colonial Merchants' while his brother operated the British end.

McArthur was described at the time as a 'Manchester warehouseman', being a wholesaler of linen and clothes made in the factories surrounding Manchester in the North-West of England. However, much of his wealth was generated from the export of gold to Britain during the Australian gold rushes. He became a wealthy businessman, merchant, and shipping magnate importing British soft-goods into Australia while exporting Australian gold to Britain. McArthur became a Member of the Legislative Assembly of New South Wales during two Parliaments and Magistrate of the Territory until he returned to England in 1863. Construction of Nugal Hall commenced following two land grants to McArthur in 1851. McArthur was married the year the house construction was completed in 1853 to Marie Bowden. The McArthurs lived in Nugal Hall from 1853 until 1857 then relocated their primary residence to the grand three-storey mansion 'Strathmore' that McArthur had purpose-built in Glebe. McArthur's eldest son, William Alexander McArthur, was born in 1857 and later became a Member of British Parliament in 1887 for St Austell, ultimately becoming Junior Lord of the Treasury in 1892. Alexander McArthur himself returned to England in 1863 to take over the British end of W&A McArthur. Following his return to England, McArthur ultimately became a Member of British Parliament for Leicester in 1874, joining his older brother who was the MP for Lambeth at that time.

In the period 1853–1863, McArthur was involved in the subdivision of his landholdings in Randwick, working closely with Callaghan. 'MacArthur's subdivision' involved the subdivision of McArthur's important triangular land block on the west side of Avoca Street covering what is now the site of the Captain Cook Statute, Royal Randwick Shopping Mall and the associated Randwick shopping precinct. McArthur's land to the east side of Avoca Street became the Nugal Hall estate and was progressively subdivided over the period 1854 to 1857 in conjunction with Callaghan's estate. As part of the subdivision arrangements, Callaghan acquired the land on which Nugal Hall was situated in two transactions in 1854 and 1857, the latter conferring Callaghan with ownership of Nugal Hall. Callaghan paid around £2,000 in aggregate for the Nugal Hall estate at the time.

Callaghan likely leased Nugal Hall to the McArthur family as their second residence until they left Australian in 1863. He may well have then lived in Nugal Hall himself while expanding his own house 'Avoca' at the time. Callaghan owned Nugal Hall at the time of his sudden passing in 1865 when he was unexpectedly charged by a colt he had been training at his farm in Braidwood, NSW. Callaghan's widow, Eliza Callaghan, became a well-known property developer and wealthy landlord in the Randwick area, residing at 'Avoca' across the road from Nugal Hall until her death in 1915. She ultimately built the residences known as Corona and Hygeia nearby in 1893 (now The Lurline).

Magnus Jackson Peden and his wife Elizabeth Neathway (née Brown) bought Nugal Hall from Eliza Callaghan for £700 in 1865. Magnus Peden was a merchant and farmer, and became Mayor of Randwick while he resided at Nugal Hall and later in life became Mayor of Bega. The Peden family resided in Nugal Hall from 1865 to 1872 as the third owners of Nugal Hall after McArthur and Callaghan. At that time, Nugal Hall was known as 'Rockville', presumably because it was built on the site of the 'flag quarry' used to supply sandstone for houses in the immediate vicinity.

The famous residents of Nugal Hall continued. Sir John Beverley Peden KCMG MLC (1871–1946), barrister and professor of law, was born in Nugal Hall on 26 April 1871, second son and sixth child of Magnus and Elizabeth Peden. In 1902, John Peden was appointed part-time Challis lecturer in the law of property at Sydney University. He practised law until he succeeded Pitt Cobbett as Challis Professor of law and Dean of the Faculty in 1910. Under Peden the law school grew steadily in reputation and influence. He was President of the Sydney University Law Society, examiner for the Barristers' Admission Board and ex officio chairman of the Solicitors' Admission Board. Peden took silk as a Queens Counsel in December 1922. In May 1917, Sir John Peden was nominated to the Legislative Council.

Sir John Peden showed lively interest in such subjects as living wages, industrial arbitration, matrimonial relations, capital punishment and workers' compensation. He eventually considered that his most important contributions as a legislator had been his defence of free speech that led to the sedition bill being dropped during World War I and his modification of the (ne temere) Marriage Amendment Act of 1924. In 1921-31 Peden served as sole royal commissioner on law reform in New South Wales. In 1930 he was appointed K.C.M.G.

In May 1873, Magnus Peden sold the Nugal Hall estate to James Mennie Tarves, a surveyor, for £920, who in turn, just five months later following a further subdivision of the land to the west, sold Nugal Hall to the Budd family – William, Annie and daughters, most of whom had been given the names of flowers. In 1876, Nugal Hall was leased by the Budd family to William & Harriett Crane.

The subdivided western land between Nugal Hall and Avoca Street was used for the construction of a residence known as 'Urara' (now Milford Hall) over the period 1873–1875. Urara was built and owned by John See who became NSW Premier in 1901–1904 while living at Urara. The subdivided land to the south-west of Nugal Hall was used the for construction of a residence known as 'Ventnor' over the period 1873–1875 (which still exists today). Ventnor was bult and owned by George Kiss who became Mayor of Randwick in 1877–1879 while living at Ventnor.

=== 1878–1908: Branksea Villa, Germania and Belle Vue ===
Joseph Barling acquired the Nugal Hall estate in 1878 and took out Torrens title for the estate. Barling was involved in the massive subdivision of Wentworth's previous 12.1 hectare (30 acre) landholding to the immediate east of the Nugal Hall estate in 1880 known as 'Avoca Estate'. That landholding was subdivided following Wentworth's passing in 1872 and created much of northern Coogee. The Nugal Hall residence was subsequently leased by Barling to William & Catherine Kirchner. Barling renamed the house from 'Rockville' to ‘Branksea Villa’, after Branksea Castle near his birthplace at Poole, Dorset, presumably recognising the prominent position of Nugal Hall on the Randwick ridge line overlooking Coogee.

Barling became one of the best known officials in the NSW public service and became the Under-Secretary for Public Works and a Commissioner of the Public Service Board, responsible for the construction of infrastructure throughout New South Wales. For his services to Australia, Barling was ultimately decorated with the Imperial Service Order.

Frederick Ricketson, a prominent Canadian grazier and financier, bought Nugal Hall from Baring in 1882 for £2,500 and lived there until 1884. During this period, Ricketson changed the name of Nugal Hall from 'Branksea Villa' to 'Nugal Lodge', being the first time the word 'Nugal' was associated with the property. The origins of the word 'Nugal' remain unknown although Ricketson is reputed to have associated the name 'Nugal' with all his landholdings, so it may have been a personal brand.

Frederick (Fred) Tidswell bought Nugal Hall from Ricketson in 1884. Tidswell was the owner of the prominent Coogee Bay Hotel at the time, which had been converted from a family residence into a grand hotel in 1873, Coogee Bay Hotel still exists today, located in Coogee Bay Road immediately across the road from Coogee Beach. The Tidswell family occupied Nugal Hall from 1884 until Tidswell's death in 1898, then continued to own Nugal Hall while leasing it until 1908. Prominent Australian physician Frank Tidswell and architect Thomas Tidswell lived in Nugal Hall as students in this period.

The northern section of Nugal Hall was built between 1885 and 1887 under the supervision of Fred Tidswell, presumably drawing from Tidwell's experience in renovating the Coogee Bay Hotel. The architect was Oswald H. Lewis, who practised as an architect with his father, former Colonial Architect, Mortimer Lewis (who had earlier designed the southern part of Nugal Hall). The northern section of Nugal Hall subsumed the original one-storey cottage and servant's quarters into a much larger and grander two-storey residence.

The design elements from this phase include a curved bay window with balcony and conical roof facing the ocean. The new northern section responded to the Gothic Revival picturesque style of the southern section of the house and was also built of sandstone that was quarried on site, also resulting in some landscaping of the site. The northern section incorporated stylistic elements of the Arts & Crafts and Federation eras, including an iconic circular tower on the eastern end of Nugal Hall with a candle-snuff roof, as well as timber balcony detailing, a shingled balcony skirt and the rounded form of the bay window. At the time of construction in 1885–87, Milford Street 'dog-legged' at the Coach House to pass directly by Nugal Hall (which sat on a small sandstone cliff overlooking the street). This meant the original front door of Nugal Hall was located to the east of the house as this was closest to Milford Street. The stone steps that led up from Milford Street to the eastern front door still exist today. As part of the renovation of Nugal Hall in 1887, Tidswell agreed to the straightening of Milford Street, resulting in the creation of the large front garden area of Nugal Hall that exists today. As a result, the main Nugal Hall residence became set back from the straightened Milford Street with a higher degree of privacy. A new grand front door entry was built in Nugal Hall facing south towards Milford Street as part of the expanded design, including entry into a large grand staircase that was lit by an innovative stained glass skylight above. The iconic palm grove along Milford Street was presumably planted at that time and the fountain and front garden landscaping created.

From 1898, upon the passing of Tidswell, the expanded and opulent Nugal Hall was leased as an ambassador's residence. The United States Government leased Nugal Hall from 1898 to 1901 for use by the Consul General of the United States of America for Australia, Colonel George William Bell. The German Government leased Nugal Hall from 1901 to 1904 for use by Paul von Buri, the Consul General of Germany for Australia, New Zealand and Fiji. During this period, Paul von Buri renamed the house ‘Germania’ and hosted a number of prominent social and diplomatic events at the residence. A flag pole was erected to the east of Nugal Hall which flew the German flag, explaining why a flag pole still exists there today. Subsequently, from 1904 to 1908, Nugal Hall was leased to the President of the French Chamber of Commerce in Australia, Georges Playoust, as his residence and was also partly used by the French Government as a diplomatic residence. Nugal Hall was renamed 'Belle Vue' during that period, being French for 'beautiful view'.

=== 1911–1920: Nugal Lodge and Nugal Hall ===
Over the period from 1908 to 1911, Nugal Hall was owned by the Tidswell family, but was run as a boutique 'first class' (5-star) guest house named 'Nugal Lodge', reverting to the property name at the time that Frederick Tidswell bought the property from Ricketson. The Biggs family were the on-site custodians of Nugal Hall for the Tidswell family during this period. At the time of sale in 1911, Nugal Hall was still described as a 'large family residence'.

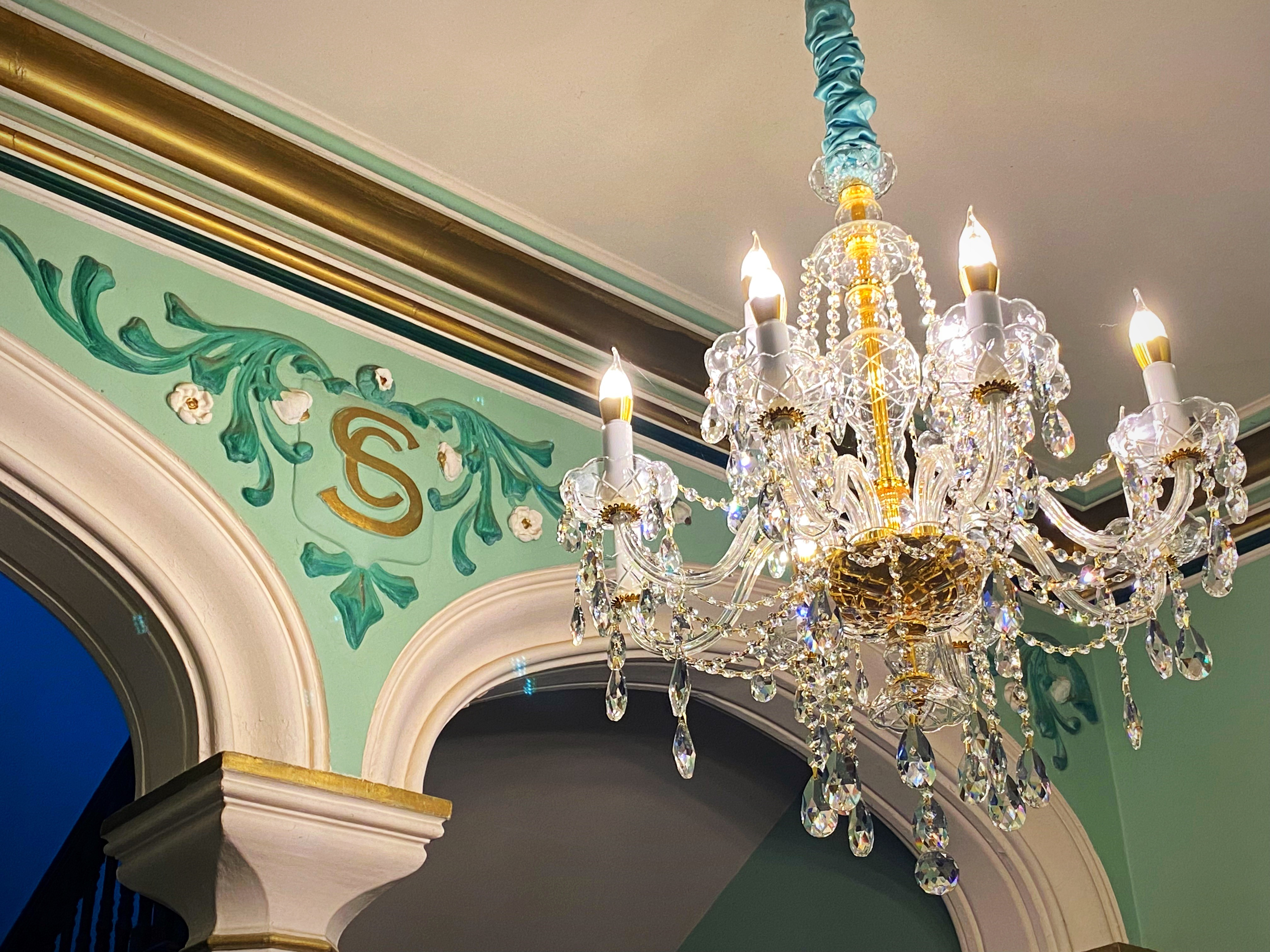
Cosens Spencer initials from 1912

In 1911, Nugal Hall was acquired by prominent movie entrepreneur Cosens Spencer (born 'Spencer Cosens'). Nugal Hall continued to be run by Spencer as a boutique 'first class' guest house. The Sacks family and the Grimm family acted as on-site custodians of Nugal Hall for Spencer. Nugal Hall was advertised in the Sydney Morning Herald as 'Nugal Lodge'. The house had its own uniformed coachman and was advertised as having a lawn tennis court, spacious landscaped grounds of around 1 acre, darkroom studio for photography, the "absolutely best view of the ocean" and "unsurpassed ocean views", and being 2 minutes from the tram. Various movie stars are said to have used Nugal Hall as accommodation in that period due to their affiliations with Spencer, including Reginald Leslie "Snowy" Baker.

In 1917, Spencer further renovated Nugal Hall and converted it from a boutique lodge to his primary residence while renaming the house from 'Nugal Lodge' to 'Nugal Hall'. As a result, Nugal Hall contains many ornate features dating from the 1910s. The embellished and inter-twined initials 'CS' can still be seen in the decorative plaster in the stairwell of Nugal Hall above spectacular hallway columns. In the 1910s, stained glass windows were in vogue for those that could afford them and Nugal Hall has an abundance of ornate stained glass, including leadlight windows in internal doors.

Over the period 1917 to 1919, Spencer sought to set up a further movie business to compete with The Combine, resulting in various litigation. Spencer ultimately settled out of court by allowing his movie business interests to be purchased by The Combine for a substantial sum of money. Spencer also agreed to a restraint that he would not further compete in Australia. Spencer sold Nugal Hall and its extensive contents in 1919 and returned to Canada with significant wealth, buying several ranches in British Columbia and ultimately becoming the largest individual land owner in the Canadian province.

In July 1919, Nugal Hall was bought by prominent businessman James Fairfax and politician James Ashton. James Fairfax was likely aware of Nugal Hall given Fairfax's friendship with neighbour George Kiss, then living across the road from Nugal Hall at the Ventnor residence. George Kiss was a horse dealer and previous Mayor of Randwick. Fairfax and Ashton donated Nugal Hall to the Red Cross as part of a recalibration of the Red Cross to focus on soldier repatriation and rehabilitation following the end of World War I. Nugal Hall briefly became a flagship Red Cross residence and convalescent home for the next 12 months for senior Australian military personnel recovering from injuries sustained in World War I. Nugal Hall, then known as 'Nugal Lodge Red Cross Home', offered 30 beds and was run by some of the foundation members of the Red Cross in Australia, including Ruby Storey and Cobden Parkes (son of Sir Henry Parkes, previously a NSW Premier).

=== 1920–1978: Nugal Hall ===
The house returned to private ownership in July 1920 and was renamed again to 'Nugal Hall' to reflect its use as a large family residence. At that time, the Catholic Church acquired some of the land associated with Nugal Hall on the southern side of Milford Street to expand the 'Our Lady of the Sacred Heart' Catholic church and associated primary school located across the road in Milford Street. The remainder of the Nugal Hall estate, then still including extensive land to the north and east, was jointly acquired by Joseph Ellis, who had been acting as the commission agent for the Catholic Church, and his son Roy Ellis. The total price paid for the Nugal Hall estate in 1921 was £4,000.

Joseph and Roy Ellis were granted consent in December 1921 to implement a subdivision of land to the north of Nugal Hall that was coordinated across several adjacent landowners, known as "Cameron's Estate". James John Hackett, the western neighbour to Nugal Hall and a bookmaker, acquired the Coach House (now 14 Milford Street) in 1921 for £250 and subsequently acquired Nugal Hall itself following the passing of Joseph Ellis in early 1924 and his wife Honorah Hackett in late 1925. A further subdivision of the land associated with Nugal Hall occurred in 1928, likely involving the subdivision and sale of land along Milford Street to the east.

In 1928, James Hackett sold Nugal Hall (excluding the Coach House) to Henry Tancred, a joint owner of Tancred Bros in the meat trade, and his wife Annie Tancred, for £4,250. Tancred Bros subsequently became the listed company, Tancred Bros Industries Ltd, Australia's largest wholesale butchering firm. The Tancred family lived in Nugal Hall until the passing of Henry Tancred in November 1936. The Tancred family were a prominent Sydney family and Nugal Hall appears to have been used for many social events in the 1930s.

In January 1937, Nugal Hall (at the time numbered 8 Milford Street) was sold by Annie Tancred to Isaac Barker Hodgson (a previous mayor of Randwick in 1900-1901) and his wife Lillian (or Lily) May Hodgson for £6,000. Hodgson was a builder by trade and he appears to have undertaken extensive renovations to the house, including replacing the roof of timber shingles at that time with a roof of red tiles. Hodgson Street in Randwick is named after Hodgson.

Various additions to Nugal Hall are cited as occurring under the ownership of the Hodgson family in the late 1930s. The renovations included additions to the western side of Nugal Hall under a sloping skillion roof. During that period, the room to the left of the front door on entering the house was converted from a billiard and smoking room to an opulent downstairs bedroom. Alterations were also made to the previous servants quarters in the west wing of the house to give the house its present form.

From the period 1945 to 1952, Nugal Hall (then 8 Milford Street) was rented by Lily Hodgson for use as a doctor's residence and practice rooms. The light hanging still above the front gate of Nugal Hall exists from this period and was used at the time to indicate that the doctor was available, as was the tradition in Australia at the time.

Nugal Hall was next purchased in November 1952 for £15,000 by John R Pillars, the owner of a successful engineering firm. In 1957, his wife Nellie (Nell) Daisy Pillars founded the Randwick Historical Society while living at Nugal Hall and as such it became the Society's first headquarters during her lifetime. The Pillars made additions to the house in the 1960s, including the construction of an upper storey bathroom in the west wing of the house.

The renumbering of Milford Street occurred in the 1960s, resulting in Nugal Hall becoming numbers 16–18 Milford Street, rather than 8 Milford Street. The land on which Nugal Hall is situated currently comprises three addresses on Milford Street, being 14 Milford Street (Coach House) and 16–18 Milford Street (Nugal Hall main residence).

The Coach House at 14 Milford Street was acquired by Nell Pillars in 1969 from the western neighbour, then Thomas Vincent Clune, a hotelier and property developer. At that time, Clune was subdividing the adjacent western land at what is now 10 and 12 Milford Street. Clune's company, High Cross Estates, later developed the land at 12 Milford Street into the luxury apartment block 'Milford Towers'. The Coach House land was re-consolidated by Nell Pillars into the Nugal Hall estate, but the Coach House building became subject to a 99-year lease from 9 June 1969 granted by Nell Pillars at the time.

=== 1978–2021: Nugal Hall and 'Randwick's Downton Abbey' ===
Frederick (John) John Campion and his wife Ellen (Helen) Mary Majella Campion, both medical practitioners, acquired Nugal Hall in 1978. When John and Helen Campion bought Nugal Hall it was divided into five flats. The Campion family undertook extensive renovation work and returned Nugal Hall to a single grand family residence while maintaining the period character of the property. In 1981, an application for a Permanent Conservation Order over Nugal Hall was made by the Campions as owners. To offset restoration costs, rating and taxation concessions were sought under the Heritage Act, resulting in a 50% discount on annual land taxes that continues today.

Nugal Hall was transferred to the State Heritage Register on 2 April 1999. The 1999 Sydney hailstorm and a previous hailstorm lead to the re-tiling of the roof with new slate tiles in 2001 to remove any further risk of future hail and storm damage.

In December 2020, the executors for the estate of Helen Campion sold Nugal Hall to the current private owners. Various media accompanied the sale including a feature article in the national publication The Weekend Australian Magazine as well as various other articles including "The sandstone city mansion: Downton Abbey one in a million - Nugal Hall is the last sandstone mansion in Randwick and is on the market for the first time in 40 years" and "Gothic Revival mansion known as 'Downton Abbey' hits the market". Downton Abbey is a fictional historical TV drama filmed at Highclere Castle, a spectacular Gothic Revival country home in Hampshire, England.

Nugal Hall was subject to extensive assessments and monitoring by independent consultants in the context of the development of adjacent apartment buildings during 2018–2021. A media campaign had been conducted by the Campion family to ensure that various concessions were made in the design and construction of the adjacent apartment buildings that were sympathetic to the heritage status of Nugal Hall. Dilapidation reports of adjacent properties to those developments independently undertaken at the request of Randwick Council indicated that Nugal Hall remains in a structurally sound condition.

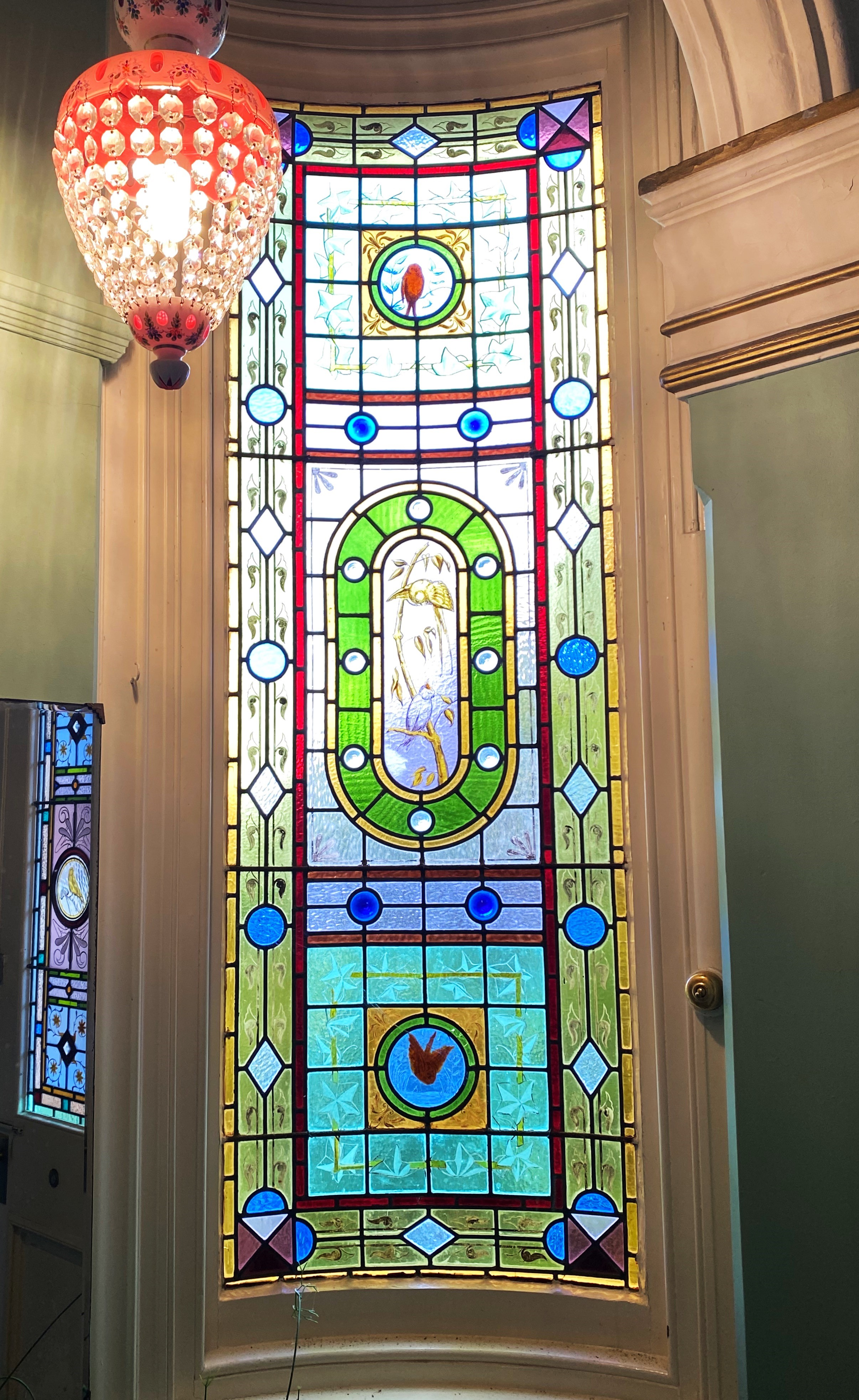
Nugal Hall stained glass window 2021

During 2021, Nugal Hall was shortlisted as one of two properties to feature as the Prime Minister's residence in the filming of the ABC/Fremantle TV drama production The PM's Daughter.

== Description ==
=== Grounds, setting and views ===
Over the years, the current grounds of Nugal Hall have been subdivided from their original 8.4 hectares (20.3 acres). As a result of the straightening of Milford Street, the main entry to the house is now from the south on Milford Street rather than from the original front entry to the east. The original front entry still faces the ocean and is located on the eastern end of the house.

Nugal Hall overlooks Wedding Cake Island and the Coogee land-sea interface, from a ground floor terrace and gardens, ancillary to the east-facing ballroom. The upstairs bedrooms to the east of the house have views over the Coogee basin, including of Coogee beach and out to Wedding Cake Island, while all other upper bedrooms have views that benefit from the location of Nugal Hall at the top of the ridge line above Coogee. The main bedroom has an east facing upper balcony positioned to watch the morning sunrise.

On either side of Nugal Hall's original east entrance are a large ball room and a large formal dining room. An entrance porch and terrace is accessed by french doors from the ball room. The dining room to the north of the entrance has views across the Coogee basin and Coogee Bay, partially obscured by a tree on a neighbouring property, as well as an eastern balcony with sea and beach views. Earlier views of the southern headland of Coogee Bay from the dining room were reduced by construction of a three storey building at 20 Milford Street, but most of that building is located below the line of sight from Nugal Hall due to the greater elevation of Nugal Hall. 20 Milford Street does not obstruct upstairs views. The ball room and terrace to the south of the entrance has views across the Coogee basin and Wedding Cake Island.

Close up views towards Nugal Hall from the opposite side of Milford Street are largely screened by its elevation above the street, the generous front setback, and the heavily planted front garden. As a result, the house has a high degree of privacy notwithstanding its landmark stature. Nugal Hall is visible from the various locations in the surrounding area, (particularly with night time floodlights) for example from St. Brigid's Church in Brook Street, Coogee and from the Carrington Road/Coogee Bay Road corner, but is not prominent from these distant locations unless floodlit. Any earlier landmark status of the building on the Randwick skyline has been diminished by the volume and scale of surrounding development, including the Sacred Heart Church and the residential flat building at 12 Milford Street. However, Nugal Hall and its iconic palm trees are still a landmark on the hill when driving up Coogee Street.

The house is located very close to Royal Randwick Shopping Centre and the terminus of the Sydney-Randwick Light Rail (providing a light rail service directly to the Sydney CBD and Circular Quay). The house sits on the boundary of the Randwick and Coogee suburbs and is within easy walking distance of Coogee Beach, Centennial Park, and the famous Bondi-Coogee Coastal Walk. The house is also within easy walking distance of the Prince of Wales Hospital and the University of New South Wales (UNSW Sydney) as well as all facilities in that combined health, innovation and education precinct. The Our Lady of the Sacred Heart church and primary school (OLSH) are across the road from the house.

=== House (16–18 Milford Street) ===
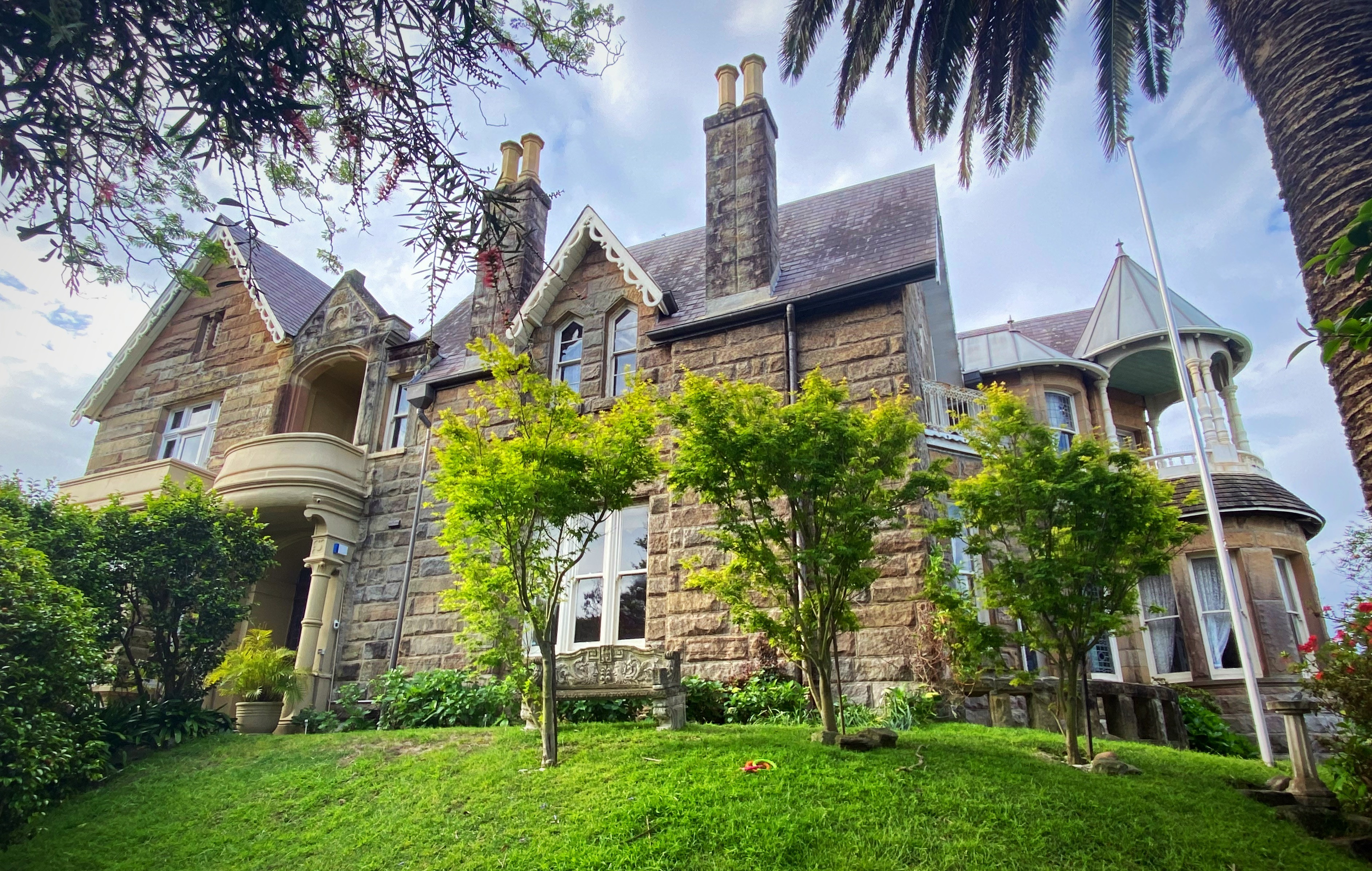
Eastern wing of Nugal Hall 2021

Nugal Hall is an example of a picturesque Gothic Revival sandstone, two storey mansion completed in 1853 with a further more expansive renovation to create a grand residence completed in 1885. The house has some outstanding interior and exterior decorations and its magnificent upper floor rounded Juliet balcony has views to Coogee Basin and out to sea.

While the house is described as two storeys, it has a full height attic and large full height basement room that provide two further storeys. The upstairs room count is seven bedrooms and two bathrooms as well as two staircases and wide passages. The downstairs room count includes a ballroom, billiard room, living room, family room, dining room, multiple kitchens, conservatory, guest bedroom, laundry and multiple bathrooms, as well as two staircases and wide passages. All rooms are ornate with high ceilings and full length windows. The attic runs the full length of the house. A pool room and bathroom exist under the house.

Despite some 1920s and 1930s decorative additions, the twelve principal rooms retain their original forms. Of interest is a sweeping grand stairwell/staircase of balanced proportion, above which is an exceptional stained glass skylight. Stonework, joinery, copper turrets and domes are all in good repair. The interior includes elegantly shaped windows, fireplaces and interior columns of marble. Ceiling roses, fireplaces, and continental ceramic tileware in the fireplaces remain immaculate.

Although not of the very high quality of a few Sydney Gothic Revival houses, Nugal Hall is nevertheless impressive. Nugal Hall is of particular importance in Coogee and Randwick where increasing high rise development has deprived the area of much of its architectural history. During 2021, two luxury apartment buildings were constructed to the north of Nugal Hall. Following a public campaign, these buildings were designed and built in a sympathetic way such that they did not interfere with the light, sun or views from Nugal Hall or cause any damage to Nugal Hall during construction.

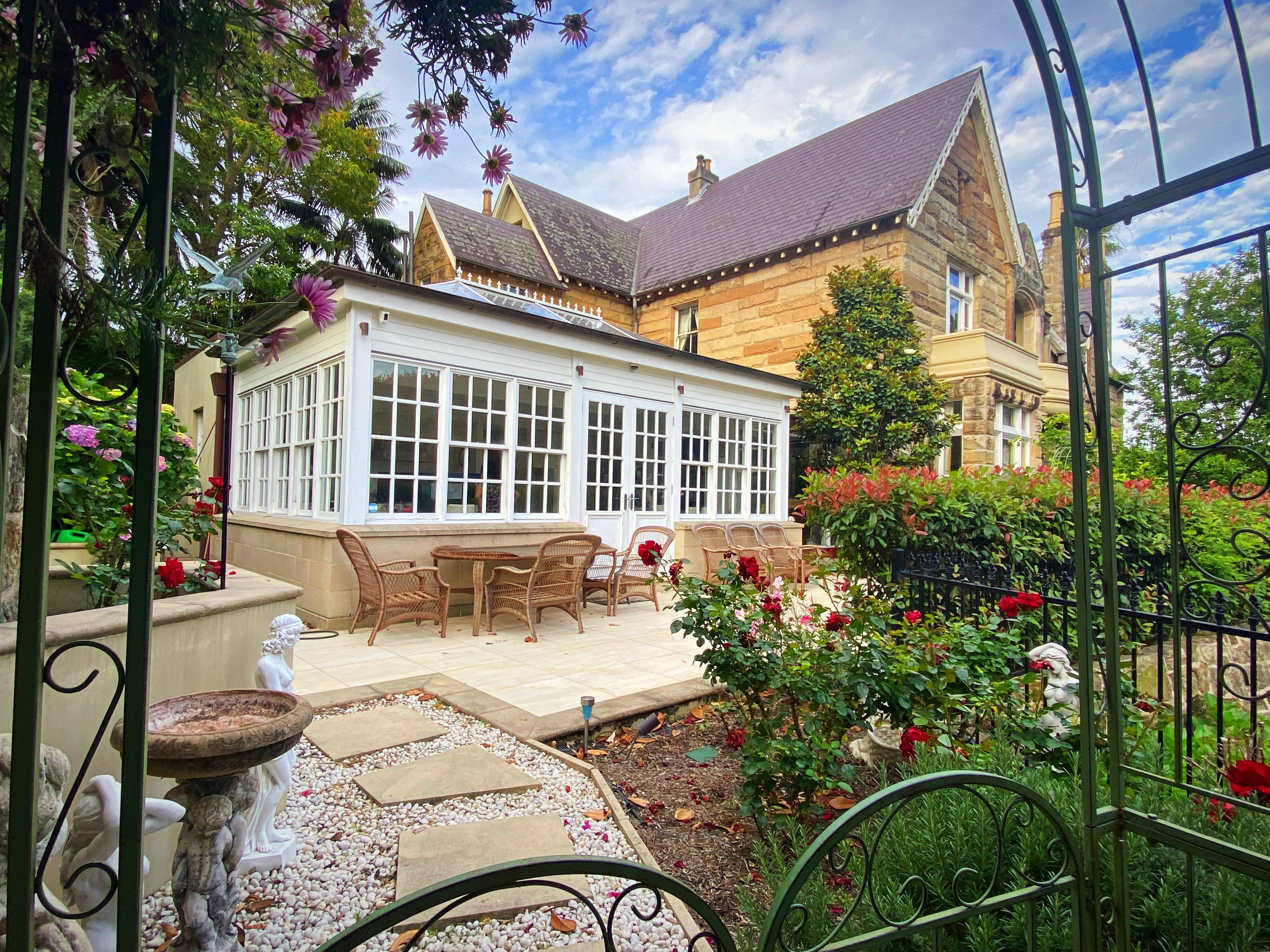
Western wing of Nugal Hall 2021

On the western side of Nugal Hall was a single storey skillion-roofed addition with brick walls dating from the late 1930s. This addition had no architectural merit and did not contribute to the architectural character of the house. As a result, this part of the house was demolished and rebuilt in 2015 with the creation of a large single-storey conservatory in Victorian style with copper roof, but with a modern interior including a new kitchen, bathroom, further bedroom and conservatory.

=== Coach House residence (14 Milford Street – under a 99-year lease) ===
Other buildings on site include the former (plastered) carriage house located at 14 Milford Street adjacent to the entrance, but forming part of the Nugal Hall estate under a 99-year lease by the owners of Nugal Hall to the current lessee, currently known as the 'Coach House' residence. The Coach House was originally a lodge for horse-drawn vehicles with an associated stables. The stables were demolished in the late 1930s while the Coach House was adapted to become a private residence.

The Coach House is currently a large, three-bedroom residence with a single garage entered directly from Milford Street. The Coach House has an original front door to the east, again recognising that Milford Street once dog-legged and hence the Coach House door was originally located on the street.

The 99-year lease of the Coach House residence at 14 Milford Street commenced on 9 June 1969 is still running with the current owners of Nugal Hall as lessors/landlords under the certificate of title and memorandum of lease. The 99-year lease of the Coach House remains as part of the Nugal Hall estate today. The lessee of the Coach House is responsible for maintaining and insuring the Coach House building and is permitted to sub-lease the premises. At the expiry of the 99-year lease on 9 June 2068, the ownership of the Coach House residence will automatically revert to the owners of Nugal Hall at that time.

=== Garage ===
There is a 20th-century double garage with a pitched roof immediately north of Coach House as well as a driveway capable of accommodating a further 4 to 6 cars.

== Modifications ==
=== 1851–1952 ===
- 1851–1853 – The original land grants that created the Nugal Hall estate involved 20.7 acres in 1851–1853 on both sides of Avoca Street. The Nugal Hall estate was progressively subdivided and sold as the suburbs of Randwick and Coogee developed in the period 1851-1930, including a number of owners of Nugal Hall that were involved in property subdivision and development during that time (McArthur, Callaghan, Barling, Tarves, Hackett).
- 1853 – The southern part of Nugal Hall was completed in 1853 to the design of Mortimer Lewis. The building comprised three interconnected parts, namely a two-storey gothic villa, a single storey cottage and a single storey servant's quarters and kitchen. The building was located on a sandstone quarry, hence is built of stone from the site and has a foundation that is securely located on rock.
- 1853–1884 – Various subdivisions of the Nugal Hall estate occurred as Callaghan and McArthur developed their land in the Randwick vicinity. The 'MacArthur's Subdivision' by Callaghan and McArthur in 1863 involved the subdivision of the core 7 acre triangular block, enabling that area to be developed as the heart of Randwick over the 1860s, 1870s and 1880s. McArthur progressively sold the remainder of his landholding to Callaghan, including ultimately Nugal Hall itself.
- 1884–1887 – The northern part of Nugal Hall was completed over 1885–1887 to the design of Oswald Lewis, who was the son of Mortimer Lewis. As Mortimer Lewis did not pass until 1889, it is highly likely that Mortimer Lewis provided input to his son on the design of Nugal Hall thereby ensuring the two parts of the building were properly reconciled.
- 1887 – As part of the construction of the northern part of Nugal Hall and due to the straightening of Milford Street in 1887, the main entrance to Nugal Hall was relocated from the east (with a front door that faced the sea view) to the south (with a front door that faced Milford Street). The new entrance door lead to a grand staircase with spectacular stained glass internal atrium, lit my innovative skylights in the attic above. The 'dog leg' in Milford Street was removed, resulting in Nugal Hall becoming set back from the street with a high degree of privacy. The iconic palm grove was planted while the fountain and landscaping of the front garden was created.
- 1898–1908 – The house was used as an ambassador's residence leading to the construction of a flagpole and presumably its opulent and ornate internal finishes.
- 1908–1918 – The house appears to have been further renovated by Spencer, leading to his initials included in the decorative plasterwork as well as ornate stained glass windows and doors throughout the residence that still exist today. Given the continued characterisation of the home as a large family residence it is unlikely that the house was formally converted into a boutique lodge, but was rather capable of supporting guests in the many large upstairs rooms.
- 1918–1921 – During the brief period of Red Cross ownership, the 7 upstairs bedrooms were converted into three large wards of 10 beds each. However, the downstairs area was kept as an opulent retreat for the guests who could also access the extensive grounds as part of their rehabilitation.
- 1921–1928 – It is assumed that Ellis and Hackett renovated the house back to its original form as an opulent family residence with 7 upstairs bedrooms before it was acquired by the Tancred family in 1928.
- 1928–1936 – A number of decorative additions were made by the Tancred family, who were ar wealthy and high profile Australian family at the time, but the twelve principal rooms retained their original forms. Media comments suggested that the Tancred family hosted many social events at Nugal Hall, indicating the ballroom was in use during the late 1920s and early 1930s.
- 1937–1952 – Isaac Hodgson was a successful builder and property developer, explaining why significant additions to the west wing of Nugal Hall occurred during this period, including an internal reconfiguration of the western rooms and servants quarters. During the late 1940s and early 1950s, the house became a doctor's residence.
- 1952–1978 – Following the passing of JR Pillars, the house appears to have been subdivided and leased by Nell Pillars, including for use as the Malaysian consulate in Sydney. However, given Nell PIllars' focus on preserving Nugal Hall it is unlikely that the subdivisions involved material changes to the form and character of the house. During the 1960s, further parts of the Nugal Hall estate were subdivided, including the construction of a house at 20 Milford Street (given to a son), the creation of the 99-year lease over the Coach House (given to a daughter) and the demolition and sale of the stables across the road in Milford Street to the Catholic church to allow the expansion of the Our Lady of the Sacred Heart primary school.

=== 1952–present ===
- 1978–2000 – The Campion family undertook extensive restoration work over a period of 8 years during the 1980s including reversing the internal subdivision of the house.
- 2000–2010 – As part of repairing the damage from the 1999 Sydney hailstorm, the Campions replaced the existing tile roof with a new slate roof to bring the building back to its original grandeur. The property was scaffolded and the tiles replaced with new battens, sarking, heritage-quality Canadian Trinity slate secured with copper clouts and new copper valleys and curved copper ridge. Deteriorated guttering at the front was replaced with new copper guttering with hand-fashioned copper ends. The property also has a rectangular metal roof and box gutter system between the steeper roof faces in the centre, so this box gutter was deepened and the metal roof given a different pitch so that in the future there would be no blockage of the box gutter if another hailstorm were to hit Sydney. Original skylights were replaced with modern Velux skylights, and a curved timber shingle roof section below the main copper spire was replaced with new timber shingles.
- 2010–2020 – Development approval was obtained by Helen Campion to replace part of the western wing of the house with a large conservatory that also could be used by her as a self-contained one-bedroom apartment with bathroom, large living area and kitchen. As part of this renovation, various plumbing and electrical wiring in the house was upgraded. The conservatory is in the Victorian Gothic Revival style and complements the design of the main house, but has modern interiors. The conservatory extension as a copper roof with an ornate roofline and large atrium-style skylight as well as modern Velux skylights. As part of the work, the western part of the Nugal Hall gardens were extensively renovated and landscaped to create an upper lawn, large patio and sheltered family area. Various engineering reports were undertaken at the time, concluding the stonework at Nugal Hall was in good condition.
- After 2020 – Upgrading of utilities including monitored fire alarm system, multiple monitored security systems, locks, plumbing and bathrooms, electrics and wiring, FOXTEL (cable TV) and connection of superfast 'Fibre to the Premises' by the National Broadband Network (nbn) with 700 Mbit/s download speeds. Maintenance has occurred to those parts of the house identified in property inspection reports as requiring maintenance.

== Valuation ==
=== Replacement valuation ===
The Nugal Hall estate currently comprises the land + main residence + Coach House 99-year lease.

- As at September 2021, the NSW land-only valuation (excluding buildings) was $7.24 million covering the land at 14, 16 and 18 Milford Street forming the Nugal Hall estate.
- The main Nugal Hall residence (building only at 16-18 Milford Street, excluding land) at that time had an estimated replacement valuation for insurance purposes of $12.14 million, excluding the three bedroom building known as the 'Coach House' at 14 Milford Street. This does not include the land value, which would be added to this figure.
- The Coach House residence (building only at 14 Milford Street, excluding land) was half way through its 99-year lease at that time with ownership to revert to the owner of the main residence (as lessor) on the expiry of that lease, so is separately insured by the lessee and has a separate valuation. A formula can be used to calculate the 99-year lease value.

=== Market valuation ===
Microburbs has identified the following characteristics of the particular location in Randwick where Nugal Hall is situated from a property valuation perspective, but the unique nature of the property (scale, grandeur, heritage, location, multiple street addresses, scarcity, landmark/trophy status) means that it cannot be benchmarked against neighbouring premises. On-line benchmarking valuation algorithms appear to generate inaccurate results by mistaking the property for a residential apartment block:

Microburbs ranking
Characteristic	Score	Comments
Affluence	10/10	High proportion of hIghly-educated residents and high-income professionals
Lifestyle	9/10	High proximity to cafes, entertainment, cinemas, beaches, walking tracks, dog park, fitness centres
Convenience	9/10	High proximity to shopping district, supermarkets, medical centres/hospital, banks, transport routes, public transport
Family	9/10	High proximity to primary & secondary schools, parks, playgrounds, childcare, shopping facilities
Community	9/10	High proximity to clubs, places of worship, libraries, sports centres, town hall, markets
Communications	9/10	Highest speeds of broadband and mobile communications are available, high proximity to post office
Tranquility	8/10	Very leafy area with low noise and medium density residential zoning
Hip	8/10	High proximity to coffee shops, restaurants, shopping village, university, Eastern Suburbs beaches

== Area of property ==
The Nugal Hall estate is situated over three residential street addresses, namely 14, 16 and 18 Milford Street, with an aggregate land area of 1,827 m^{2}.

Around 36% the land is occupied by buildings. The remaining 64% of the land comprises large upper and lower landscaped gardens (including fountain and rose gardens), a sweeping driveway and an outdoor entertainment area.

There are three key buildings on that land with an aggregate floor area of 1,612 m^{2} as set out in the following table:

Floor area of the Nugal Hall residence (1,372 m^{2}), Coach House residence (170 m^{2}) and Garage (70 m^{2})
Structure	Element of structure	Area in m^{2}	Description of rooms
Nugal Hall residence	Basement	99	Pool room, bathroom
Nugal Hall residence	Conservatory	120	Conservatory, bedroom, bathroom, laundry, kitchen
Nugal Hall residence	Ground floor (including decks)	410	Ballroom, family, living, dining, grand stairs, servant stairs, grand corridor, kitchen, gym, bathroom/laundry, decks x 2
Nugal Hall residence	Upper floor (including balconies)	394	Bedrooms x 6, home theatre, WIR, bathrooms x 2, grand stairs, servant stairs, grand corridor, balconies x 4
Nugal Hall residence	Attic	349	Attic rooms x 2, Storage x 1
Coach House residence	Ground floor	170	Living room, kitchen, bedrooms x 3, bathroom, garage/laundry
Garage		70	Double garage

== Prominent owners and residents ==
Summary of prominent owners and residents of Nugal Hall (1851-1957)
Name	Prominence
Alexander (Alex) McArthur	Founder of A&W McArthur Colonial Merchants. Member of NSW Leglslative Assembly. British Member of Parliament.
William Alexander McArthur	Partner in A&W McArthur Colonial Merchants. British Member of Parliament. Junior Lord of the Treasury in Britain.
Judge Thomas Callaghan	District Court Judge. Chief Judge of the Sydney Court of General and Quarter Sessions.
Magnus Jackson Peden	Mayor of Randwick (1869-1870)
John Beverley Peden	Member of NSW Legislative Council. Queens Counsel. Dean of Faculty of Law at Sydney UNiversity.
Joseph Barling	NSW Under-Secretary for Public Works; Commissioner of the Public Service Board
Frederick (Fred) Squire Tidswell	Prominent Sydney hotelier - Coogee Bay Hotel; Royal Hotel (George St); Metropolitan Hotel (King St)
Francis (Frank) Tidswell	Prominent Australian physician. Director of Pathology at Royal Alexandria Hospital for Children.
Colonel George William Bell	Consul-General for the United States
Paul von Buri	Consul-General for Germany
Georges Playoust	President of the French Chamber of Commerce. Councillor of French Foreign Trade (senior diplomatic position)
Cosens Spencer	Firm producer. Movie entrepreneur. Movie studio owner. Founder of what is now EVENT Cinemas.
Reginald Leslie 'Snowy' Barker	Olympic medallist (swimming, boxing). Rugby star. Sports promoter. Hollywood actor. Australia's 'first action movie star'.
Cobdon Parkes	Prominent Australian physician. Son of Sir Henry Parkes (NSW Premier)
James Oswald Fairfax	Newspaper publisher and chair of John Fairfax & Sons Ltd. Media magnate. Philanthropist.
James Ashton	Member of NSW Legislative Assembly. Minister in NSW Government.
Henry Tancred	Prominent businessman and co-founder of Tancred Bros Industries (meat wholesaler)
Isaac Barker Hodgson	Mayor of Randwick (1900-1902)

Neighbours to Nugal Hall in immediately adjacent properties have also included John See (NSW Premier, 1901-1904) and George Kiss (Mayor of Randwick, 1877-1879).

== Heritage listing ==
As at October 2021, Nugal Hall is of State significance in NSW as an example of an impressive two storey mansion constructed of sandstone in the Gothic Revival style. Designed by the colonial architect Mortimer Lewis it was completed in 1853. The original land was a grant to Alexander McArthur, in 1851 by Governor Fitzroy, of 8.3 hectares (20.7 acres). Although not of the very high quality of a few Sydney Gothic Revival houses, Nugal Hall is nevertheless impressive. It is associated with a number of significant people. It is significant in Coogee and Randwick where increasing high rise development has deprived the area of much of its architectural history. The house sits well in its grounds and is visually important locally.

Nugal Hall was listed on the New South Wales State Heritage Register on 2 April 1999.

== See also ==
- Australian residential architectural styles
