= Ventor =

Ventor can refer to

- Jürgen "Ventor" Reil, the drummer of Kreator
- Bentor, also called Ventor

== See also ==
- Ventnor (disambiguation)
