= Corana and Hygeia =

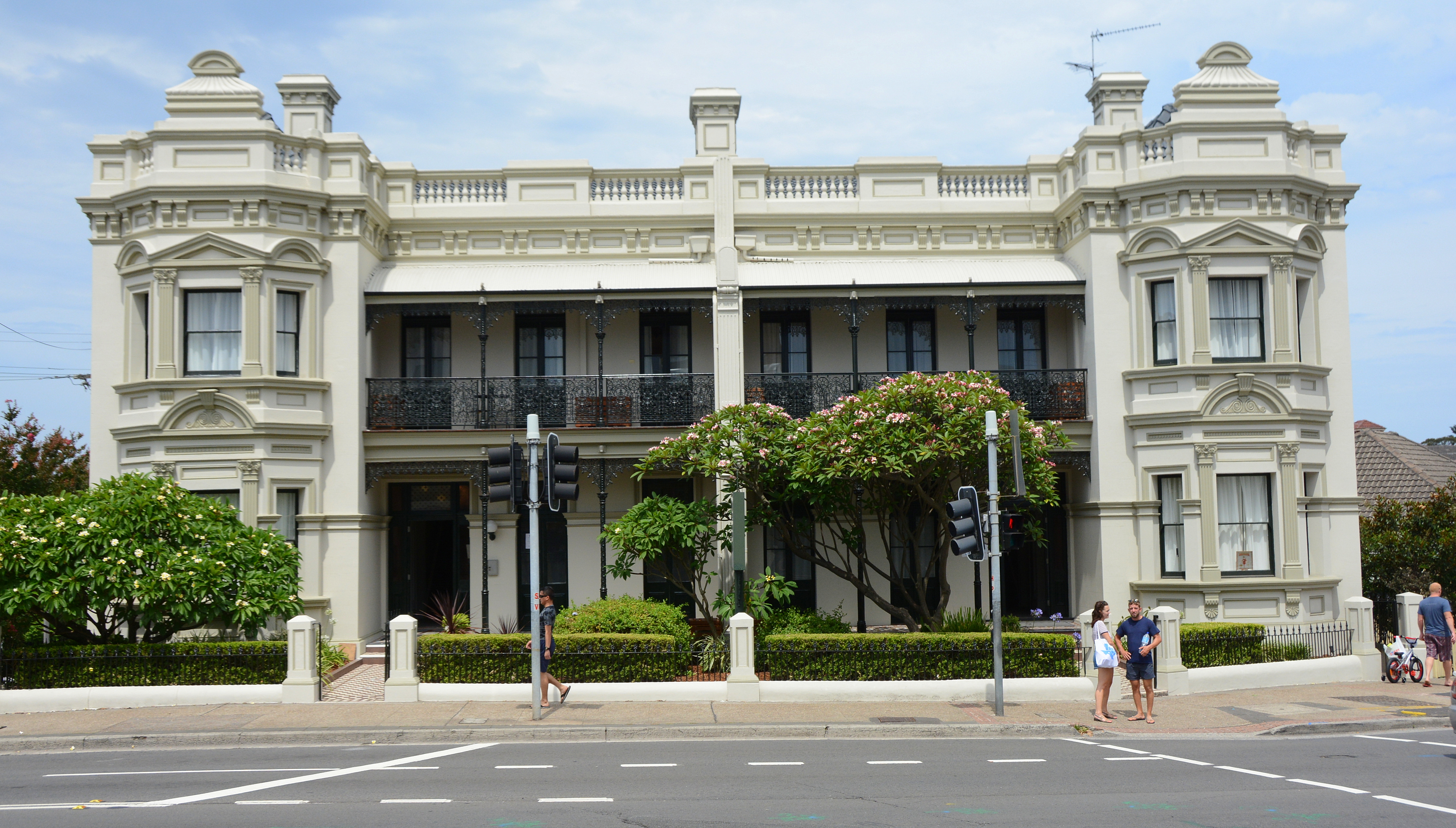
- Corana and Hygeia in 2016

- Location within Sydney Location within Australia
- 33°55′02″S 151°14′29″E
- Location: 211–215 Avoca Street, Randwick, City of Randwick, New South Wales, Australia

History
- Built: 1893–1894

Site notes
- Architectural style: Victorian Italianate

New South Wales Heritage Register
- Official name: Corana and Hygeia; Corana & Hygeia Victorian Terraces; Corona
- Type: State heritage (built)
- Designated: 2 April 1999
- Reference no.: 454
- Type: Terrace
- Category: Residential buildings (private)

Corana and Hygeia are a heritage-listed pair of semi-detached residences at 211–215 Avoca Street in the Sydney suburb of Randwick, New South Wales, Australia. They were built from 1893 to 1894. They are also known as Corana & Hygeia Victorian Terraces, Corona, Randwick Lodge and has recently re-branded to The Lurline. The property is privately owned. It was added to the New South Wales State Heritage Register on 2 April 1999.

== History ==
=== Indigenous history ===
Pre-1780s the local Aboriginal people in the area used the site for fishing and cultural activities; rock engravings, grinding grooves and middens remain in evidence. In 1789 Governor Arthur Phillip referred to "a long bay", which became known as Long Bay. Aboriginal people are believed to have inhabited the Sydney region for at least 20,000 years. The population of Aboriginal people between Palm Beach and Botany Bay in 1788 has been estimated to have been 1,500. Those living south of Port Jackson to Botany Bay were the Cadigal people who spoke Dharug, while the local clan name of Maroubra people was "Muru-ora-dial". By the mid nineteenth century the traditional owners of this land had typically either moved inland in search of food and shelter, or had died as the result of European disease or confrontation with British colonisers.

=== Colonial history ===
One of the earliest land grants in this area was made in 1824 to Captain Francis Marsh, who received 4.9 hectares (12 acres) bounded by the present Botany and High Streets, Alison and Belmore Roads. In 1839 William Newcombe acquired the land north-west of the present town hall in Avoca Street.

Randwick takes its name from the town of Randwick, Gloucestershire, England. The name was suggested by Simeon Pearce (1821–86) and his brother James. Simeon was born in the English Randwick and the brothers were responsible for the early development of both Randwick and its neighbour, Coogee. Simeon had come to the colony in 1841 as a 21 year old surveyor. He built his Blenheim House on the 1.6 hectares (4 acres) he bought from Marsh, and called his property "Randwick". The brothers bought and sold land profitably in the area and elsewhere. Simeon campaigned for construction of a road from the city to Coogee (achieved in 1853) and promoted the incorporation of the suburb. Pearce sought construction of a church modelled on the church of St. John in his birthplace. In 1857 the first St Jude's stood on the site of the present post office, at the corner of the present Alison Road and Avoca Street.

Randwick was slow to progress. The village was isolated from Sydney by swamps and sandhills, and although a horse-drawn omnibus was operated by a man named Grice from the late 1850s, the journey was more a test of nerves than a pleasure jaunt. Wind blew sand over the track, and the bus sometimes became bogged, so that passengers had to get out and push it free. From its early days Randwick had a divided society. The wealthy lived elegantly in large houses built when Pearce promoted Randwick and Coogee as a fashionable area. But the market gardens, orchards and piggeries that continued alongside the large estates were the lot of the working class. Even on the later estates that became racing empires, many jockeys and stablehands lived in huts or even under canvas. An even poorer group were the immigrants who existed on the periphery of Randwick in a place called Irishtown, in the area now known as The Spot, around the junction of St.Paul's Street and Perouse Road. Here families lived in makeshift houses, taking on the most menial tasks in their struggle to survive.

In 1858 when the NSW Government passed the Municipalities Act, enabling formation of municipal districts empowered to collect rates and borrow money to improve their suburb, Randwick was the first suburb to apply for the status of a municipality. It was approved in February 1859, and its first Council was elected in March 1859.

Randwick had been the venue for sporting events, as well as duels and illegal sports, from the early days in the colony's history. Its first racecourse, the Sandy Racecourse or Old Sand Track, had been a hazardous track over hills and gullies since 1860. When a move was made in 1863 by John Tait, to establish Randwick Racecourse, Simeon Pearce was furious, especially when he heard that Tait also intended to move into Byron Lodge. Tait's venture prospered, however and he became the first person in Australia to organise racing as a commercial sport. The racecourse made a big difference to the progress of Randwick. The horse-drawn omnibus gave way to trams that linked the suburb to Sydney and civilisation. Randwick soon became a prosperous and lively place, and it still retains a busy residential, professional and commercial life.

Today, some of the houses have been replaced by home units. Many European migrants have made their homes in the area, along with students and workers at the nearby University of NSW and the Prince of Wales Hospital.

=== Corona and Hygeia ===
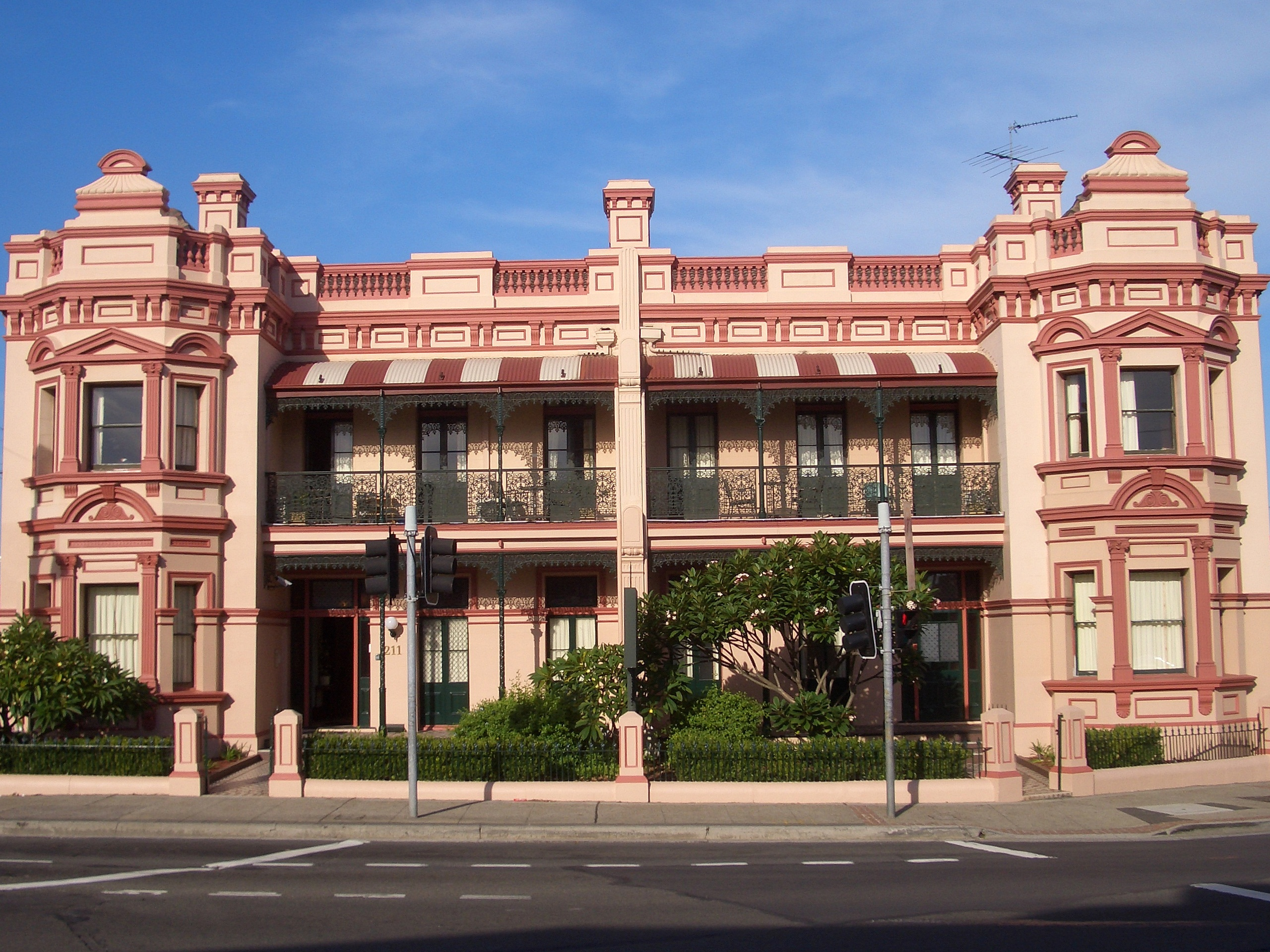
Corona and Hygeia, pictured in 2014.

The site of Corona and Hygeia is part of an original crown grant purchased in 1853 by Judge Callaghan, Chairman of the Court of Quarter Sessions, Sydney. Judge Callaghan built and occupied Avoca which stood opposite Nugal Hall at 16-18 Milford Street Randwick. He died in 1863.

His widow, Elizabeth and his daughter Mary Milford Auber Jones, built the two large attached houses at 211-215 Avoca Street, Randwick apparently for rental. According to Randwick Municipal Rate Books the two houses were under construction in 1893 and were completed in 1894.

From 1894 until 1897, only one of the houses was occupied that on the corner of Mears Avenue. From 1895 to 1898, it was used as a house and post office before the Present post office in Randwick was opened. The occupant was J A Kelly, the postmaster. In 1898, the post office and Mr Kelly moved, and for the first time the other house was occupied. In 1898, both houses were occupied and the occupants listed in the Sands Directory were J. Mills, Corona and J. Middleton Hygeia. 1898 was the first year the names Corona and Hygeia appear.

Other occupiers listed in the Sands directory include:

- 1918 – Doctors G. Lindeman and G.H Broniowski Corona
- 1911–1944 – A.E. Booth Dentist

After 1919, the names Corona and Hygeia are no longer used. In 1925, Hygeia was listed as flats. On 20 November 1984, the property was sold at auction.

In January 1984, the Heritage Branch received representations from the National Trust of Australia (NSW) concerned at the deteriorated state and vacancy of the building. An Interim Conservation Order was placed over the building on 31 August 1984 to provide time to investigate its significance and to determine whether its conservation was warranted. On 9 April 1986, the Minister gave public notice of an intention to make a Permanent Conservation Order over the property. An objection was subsequently lodged by the owners of the property and a Commission of Inquiry was held on 10 September 1986. Following further discussion with the owner the objection was withdrawn. A Permanent Conservation Order was made over the property on 22 January 1988. On the 2 April 1999, it was transferred to the State Heritage Register. The building is currently used as rental accommodation.

== Description ==
Corona and Hygeia are an attached pair of large semi-detached mansions designed in the late Victorian Italianate style. Stucco finished with heavily decorated balustered roof parapets and classically derived pediments over the bowed section of the front façade and as decoration over the window lintels. Deep string course mouldings extend around the side elevations. The verandahs at the front and back retain richly decorative iron lace valances and cast iron columns.

Ground floor front verandahs are attractively tiled. Original roof believed to be of slate and now covered in tiles.

Internal joinery to the main rooms mainly intact. Stair halls to both house and balustrades. A distinguishing feature of the houses is the use of native bird motifs in the internal décor. These occur in the coloured leadlight windows at the stair half landings and in the highlights above the front windows. Bird motifs are also found in the keystone of the arch of one of the fireplace surrounds and in the hearth tiles.

=== Condition ===
As at 15 September 2011, the archaeological potential is low.

=== Modifications and dates ===
- 1985 – approval for interior/exterior painting; repair to damaged plaster, architraves, skirting boards and flooring; repair roofing and guttering and tiling to front verandah.
- 1994 – restoration and adaptive reuse into residential accommodation

== Heritage listing ==
As at 19 September 2011, Corana and Hygeia are of State heritage significance as two semi-detached mansions in the late Victorian style and constructed in 1898. They have particular aesthetic significance as a large and picturesque late Victorian two-storey pair of houses with good cast-iron work on the verandah valences and columns. It has heavily decorated balustraded roof parapets, classically derived tiled verandah floors and front fences of cast iron and masonry. The building is of excellent streetscape value and provides a significant contribution to the High Cross townscape precinct at Randwick. Their historical significance is derived from its association with the family of Judge Thomas Callaghan, a prominent citizen and member of the judiciary. (Heritage Branch files)

Corana and Hygeia was listed on the New South Wales State Heritage Register on 2 April 1999.
