= Ventnor (disambiguation) =

Ventnor is a seaside resort and civil parish established in the Victorian era on the southeast coast of the Isle of Wight, England.

Ventnor may also refer to:

- RAF Ventnor
- SS Ventnor
- Ventnor, Queensland
- Ventnor, Randwick
- Ventnor, Victoria

== See also ==
- Ventnor City, New Jersey
