= Ventnor, Randwick =

Ventnor
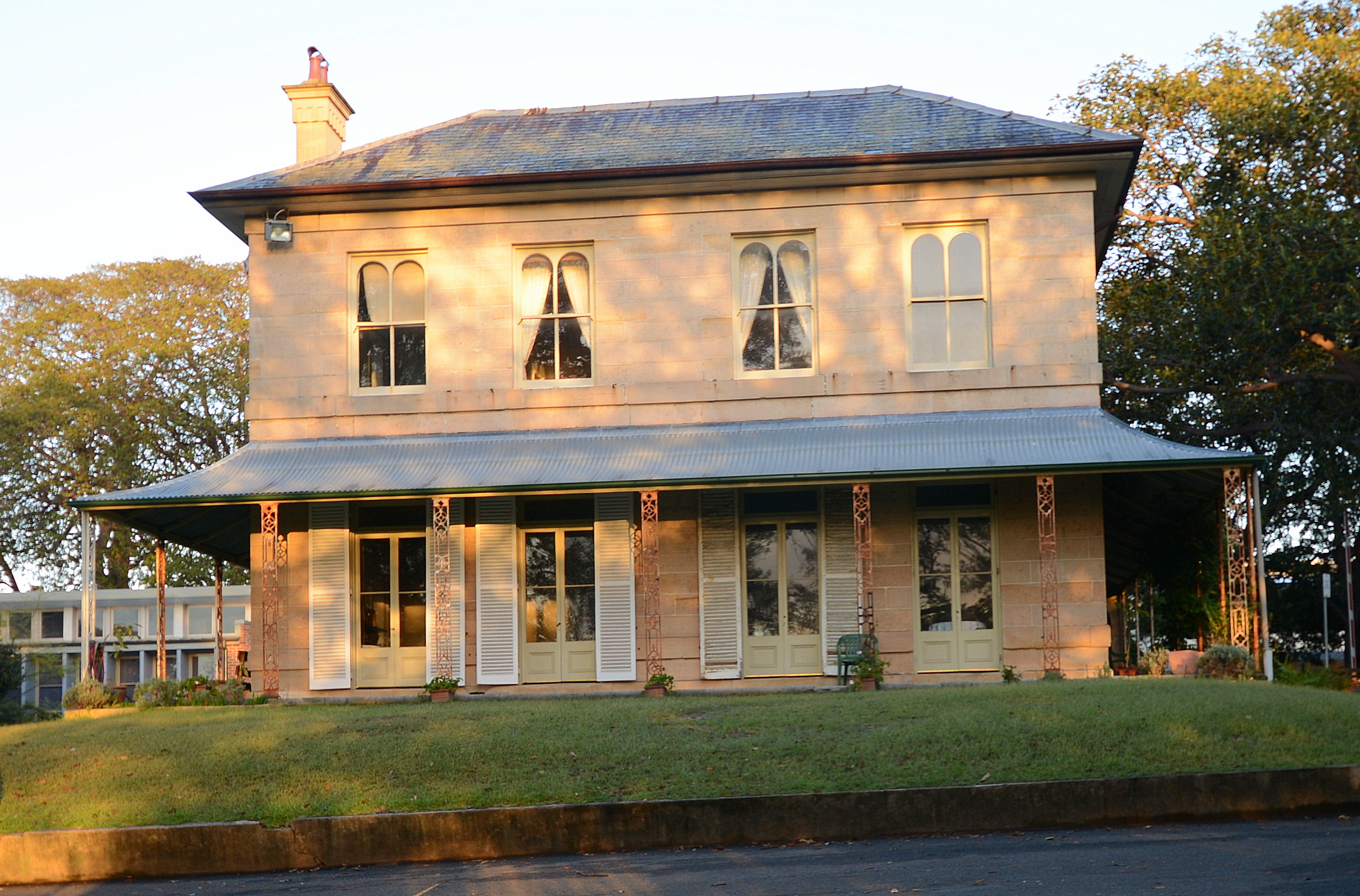
- Ventnor at sunrise

- Location within inner Sydney
- Etymology: Ventnor on the Isle of Wight

General information
- Type: House
- Location: 193 Avoca Street, Randwick, New South Wales, Australia
- Coordinates: 33°54′56″S 151°14′31″E
- Construction started: 1870
- Completed: 1888
- Client: George Kiss
- Owner: Our Lady of the Sacred Heart Church, Randwick

Register of the National Estate
- Official name: Ventnor, 187 Avoca St, Randwick, NSW, Australia
- Type: Historic (defunct register)
- Designated: 21 March 1978
- Reference no.: 1751

New South Wales Heritage Database (Local Government Register)
- Official name: Our Lady of the Sacred Heart Church and Ventnor (sandstone house)
- Type: Built
- Designated: 26 June 1998
- Reference no.: 2310074
- Group: Religion
- Category: Church

Ventnor is an historic home in the suburb of Randwick, a suburb of Sydney in New South Wales, Australia. It was built as the home of George Kiss, one of the earliest politicians in Sydney. It is listed on the local heritage register and is listed on the (now defunct) Register of the National Estate.

== Description and history ==
George Kiss arrived in Sydney as a migrant who had been born in Warwickshire, England. He established successful businesses very quickly. Later he entered politics, becoming Mayor of Randwick, the oldest municipality in Sydney after the City of Sydney itself.

Kiss built his home in Randwick in c. 1870, creating a two-storey, Georgian house of Sydney sandstone. He called it Ventnor, most probably after the town Ventnor on the Isle of Wight, England. Situated on what is now Avoca Street, the house faced east to take advantage of the views to the ocean. In spite of its Georgian character, the house featured Victorian detailing in its cast-iron columns and various sash windows. The main entrance, situated on the east side of the house, featured a six-paneled door and a fanlight. On the west side of the house, facing Avoca Street, a single-storey wing was created.

Kiss died 13 August 1882. Two days later, the Sydney Morning Herald reported that Kiss had died in Ventnor on the previous Sunday. It described how he had made himself prominent in Sydney by his untiring energy and business capacity, laying the foundations of his businesses soon after arriving in the colony. He had gone on to become Mayor of Randwick and was still an alderman of Randwick at his death.

Ventnor was eventually acquired by the Our Lady of the Sacred Heart Church, situated just south of the house. It is used as a community centre by groups such as GROW.

== Gallery ==
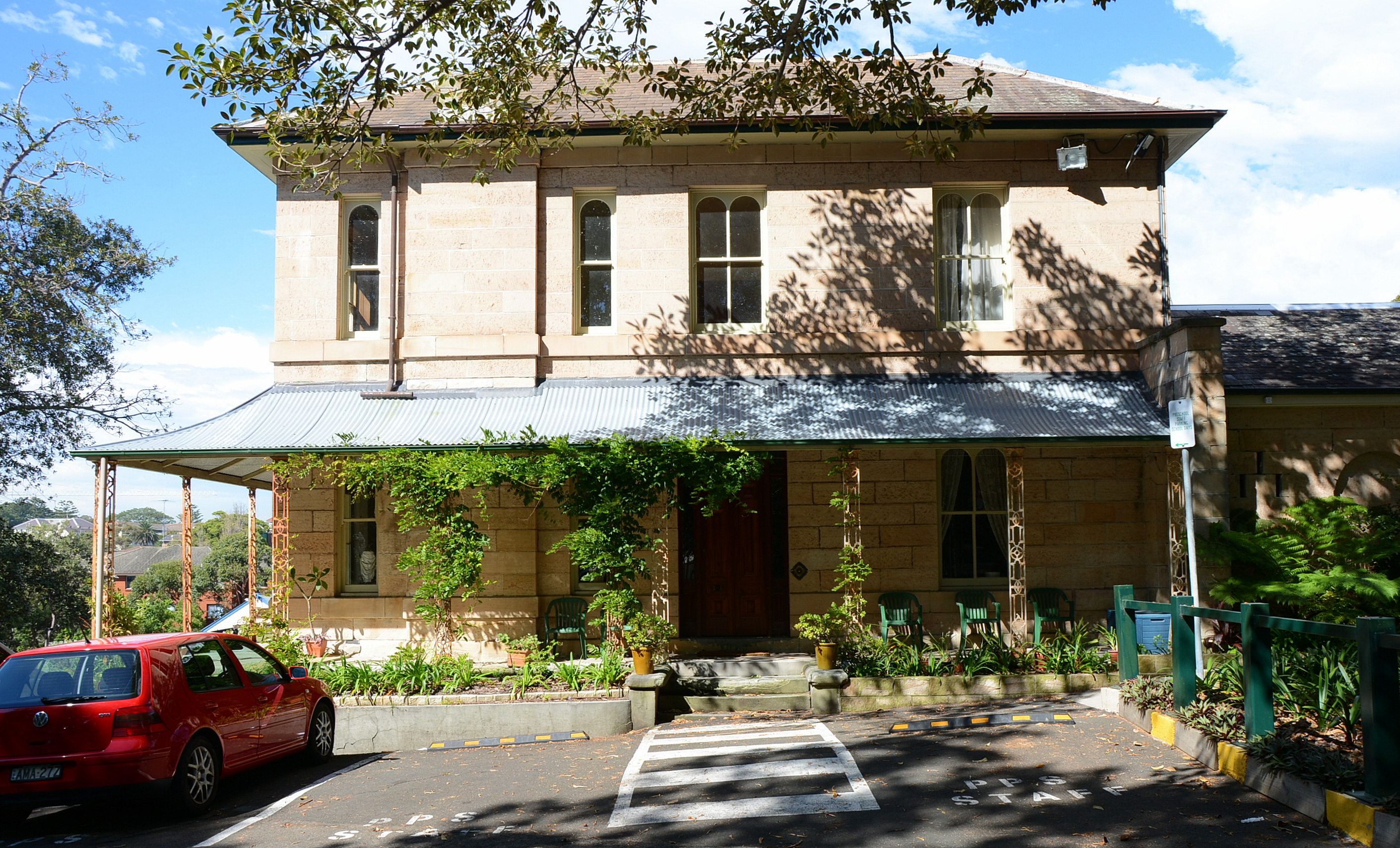
Ventnor, north side

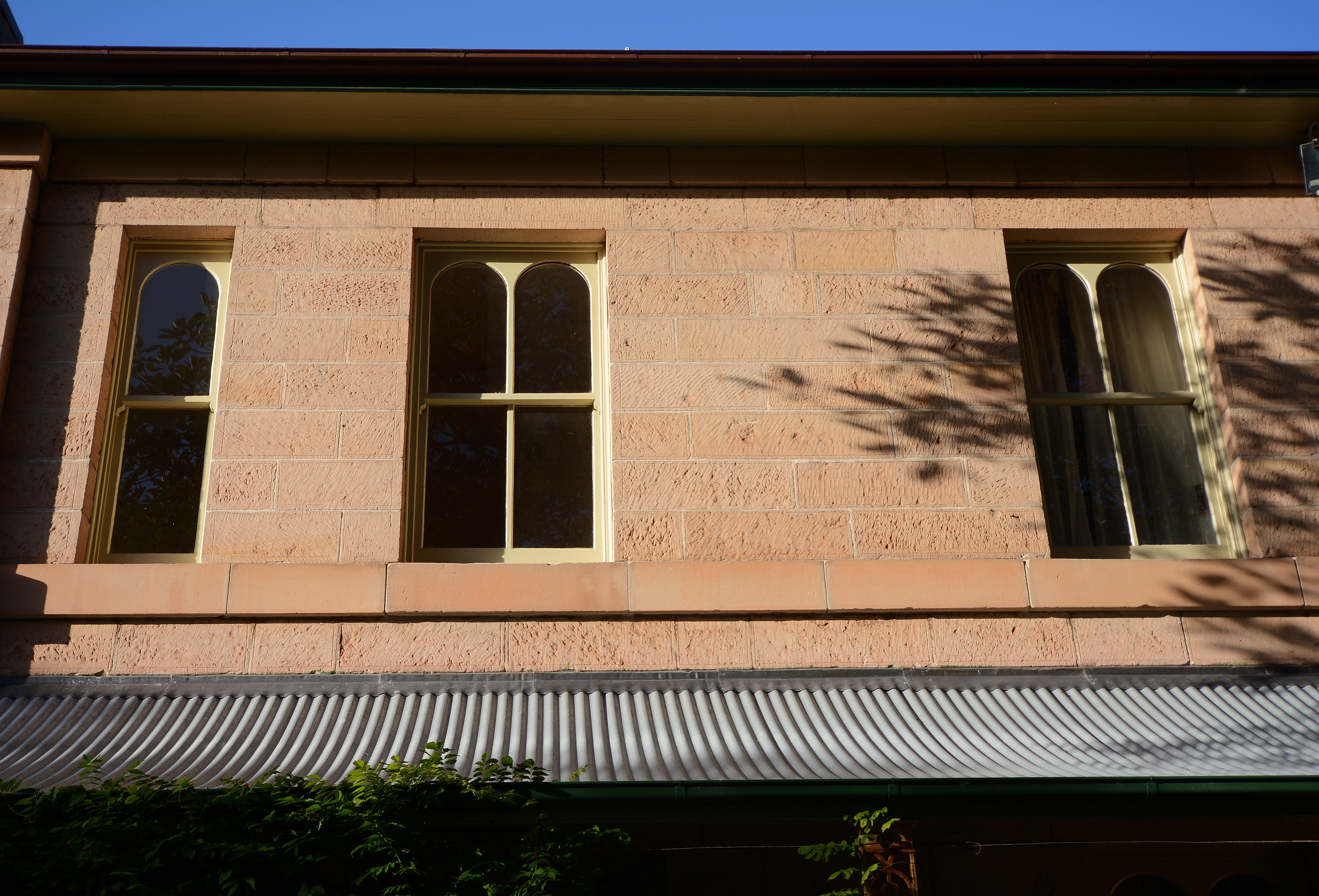
Windows on the north side of the house

== See also ==
- List of heritage houses in Sydney
