= Our Lady of the Sacred Heart Church, Randwick =

Our Lady of the Sacred Heart Church
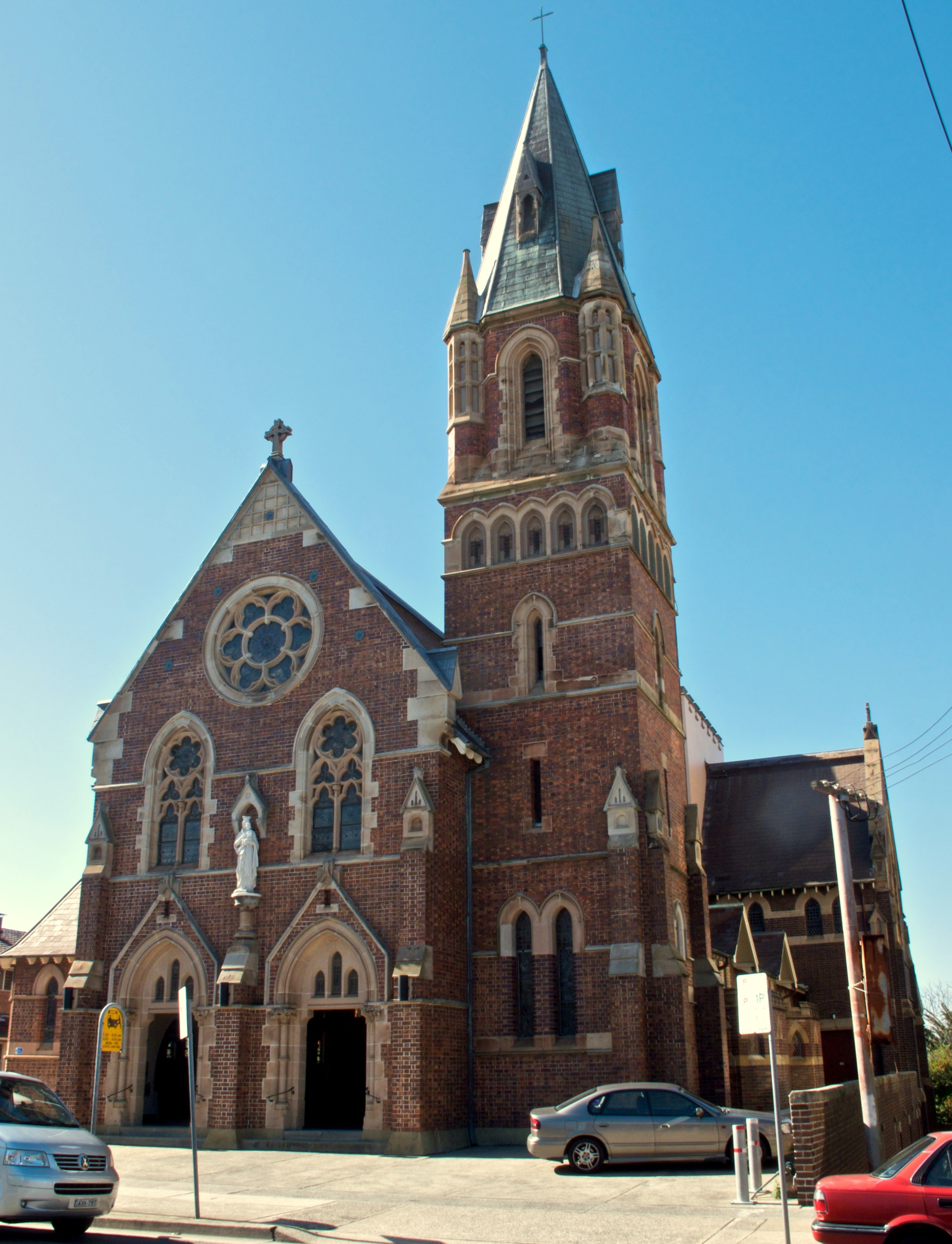

- Location of the Our Lady of the Sacred Heart Church in Greater Sydney
- 33°54′58″S 151°14′30″E
- Location: 193 Avoca Street, Randwick, Sydney, New South Wales
- Country: Australia
- Denomination: Roman Catholic
- Religious order: Missionaries of the Sacred Heart
- Website: www.sacredheart.org.au

History
- Status: Church

Architecture
- Functional status: Completed
- Architectural type: Gothic Revival
- Years built: 1870–1888

Administration
- Archdiocese: Metropolitan Archdiocese of Sydney

The National Shrine and Church of Our Lady of the Sacred Heart is a Roman Catholic church in Randwick in the Eastern Suburbs of Sydney, New South Wales, Australia. It is heritage-listed.

== History and description ==
The church is situated in Avoca Street, Randwick, adjacent to the commercial centre of the area. It was designed by Sheerin and Hennessy in a Gothic Revival style and built in 1888. It consists predominantly of brick with sandstone trimmings, with a spire on its southern side. Inside, there is a trussed timber roof and a stained-glass window behind the altar. A Gothic-style octagonal chapel and shrine are located near the altar.

The church is listed on the local government heritage register. The sandstone building next door, known as Ventnor, is owned and used by the church. It was built in 1870 and was the home of George Kiss, Mayor of Randwick. It also is listed on the local government heritage register.

== Work ==
Our Lady of the Sacred Heart Parish, Randwick, St. Margaret Mary’s Parish, Randwick North, are Catholic parishes under the care of the Missionaries of the Sacred Heart and share a common heritage and administration in the Roman Catholic Archdiocese of Sydney. The parishes are located within a busy urban centre and include two regional Catholic high schools, two parish primary schools, a large public teaching hospital complex, a major university and aged care facilities.

== Gallery ==
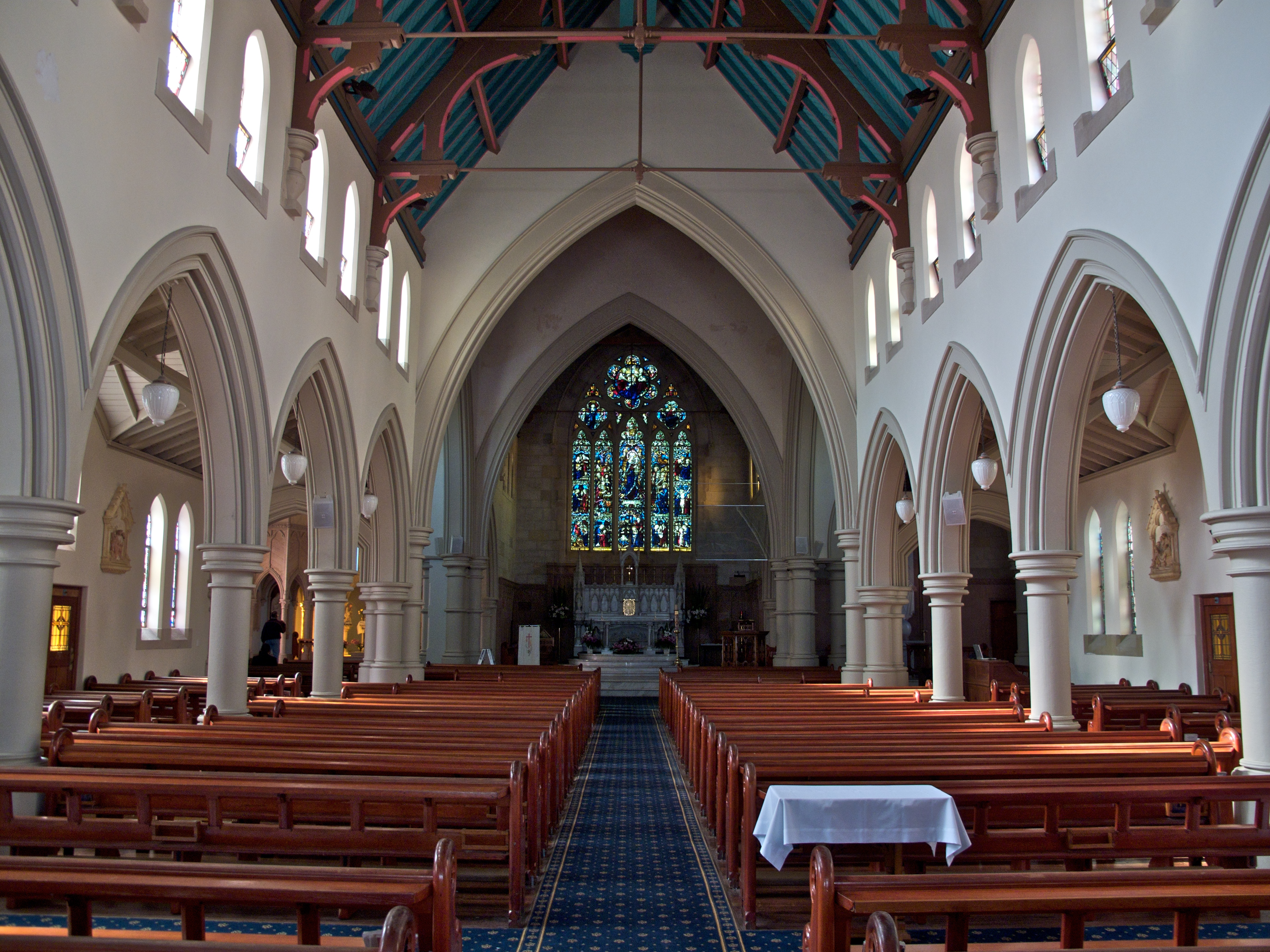

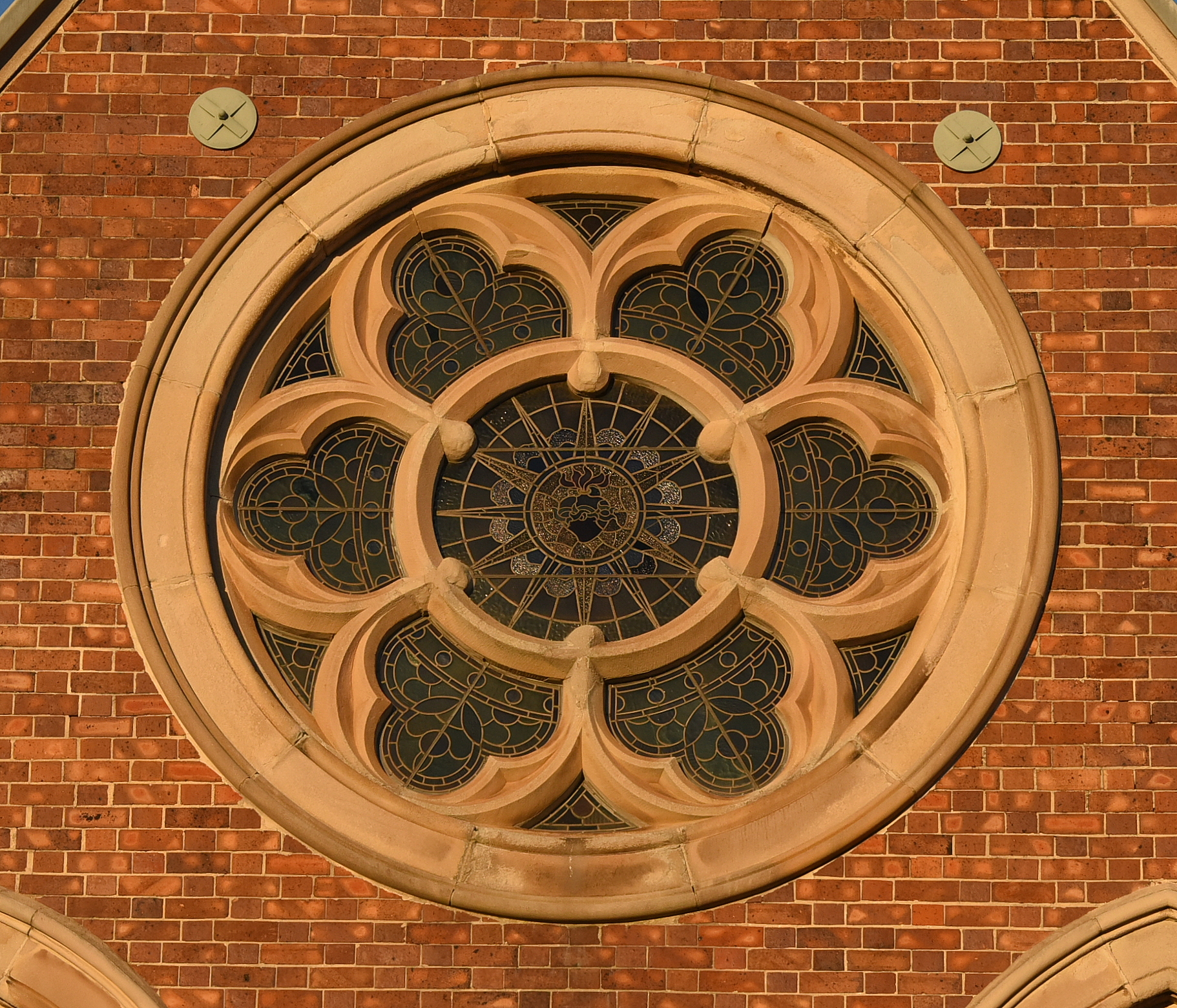

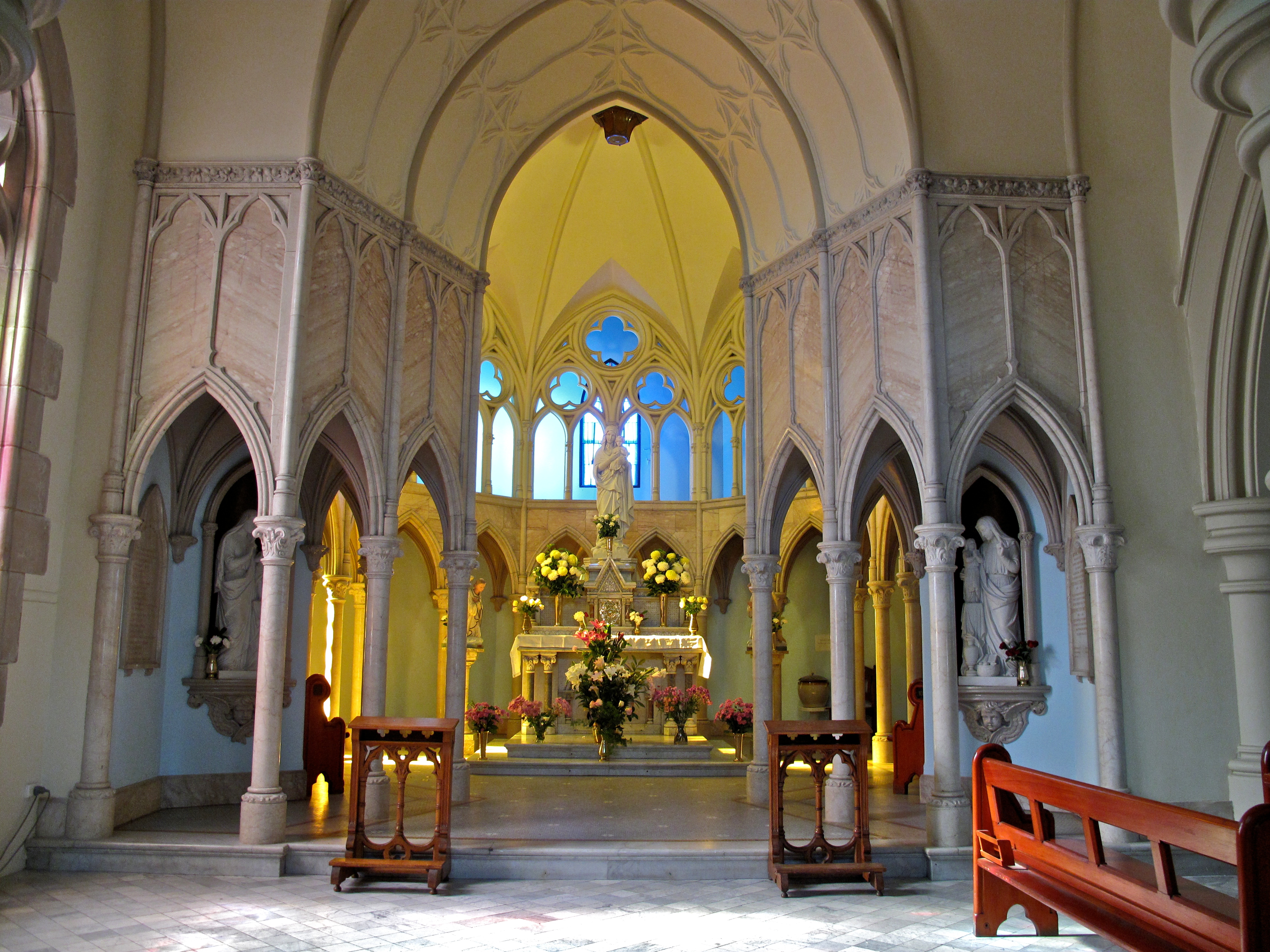

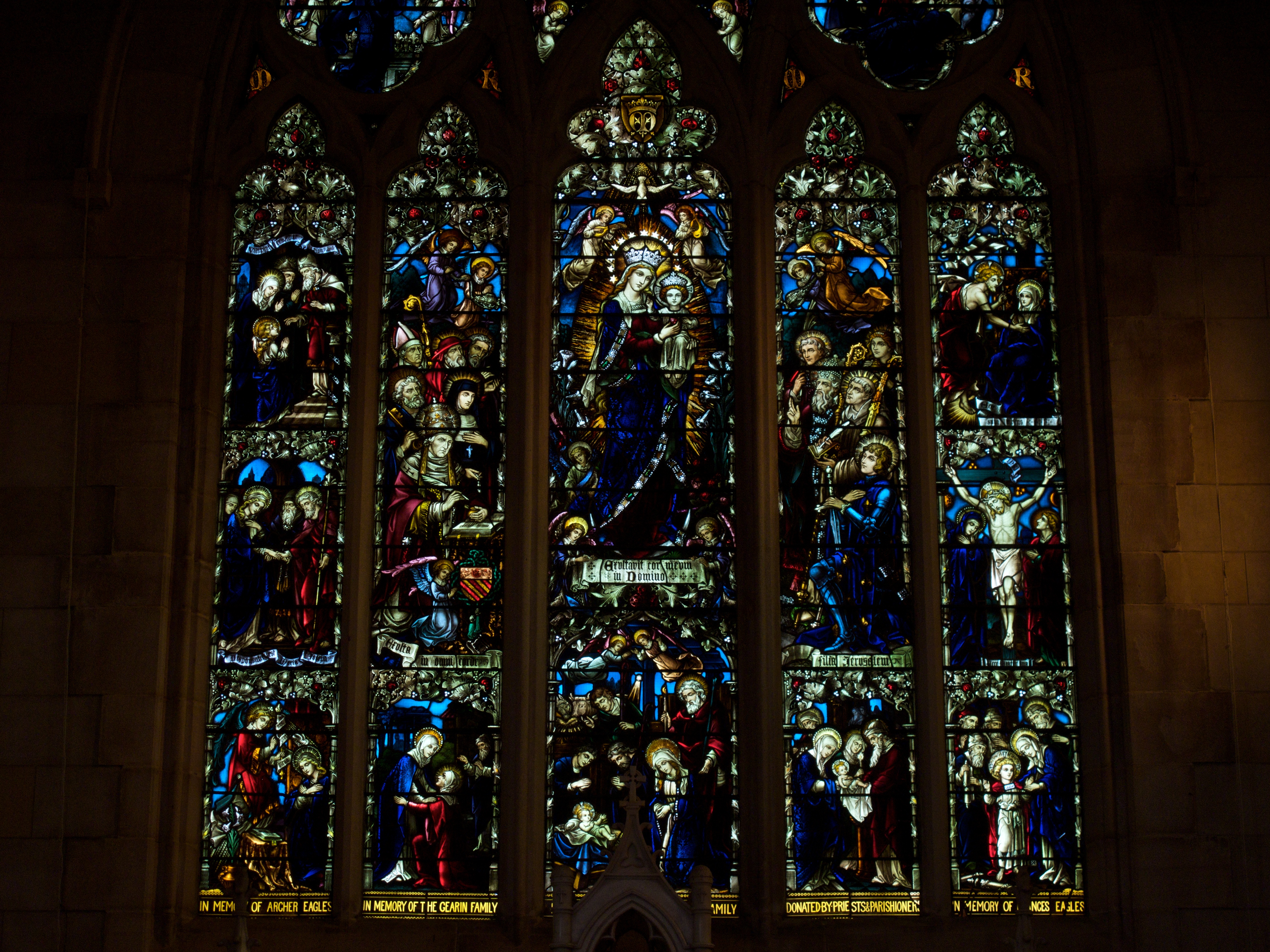

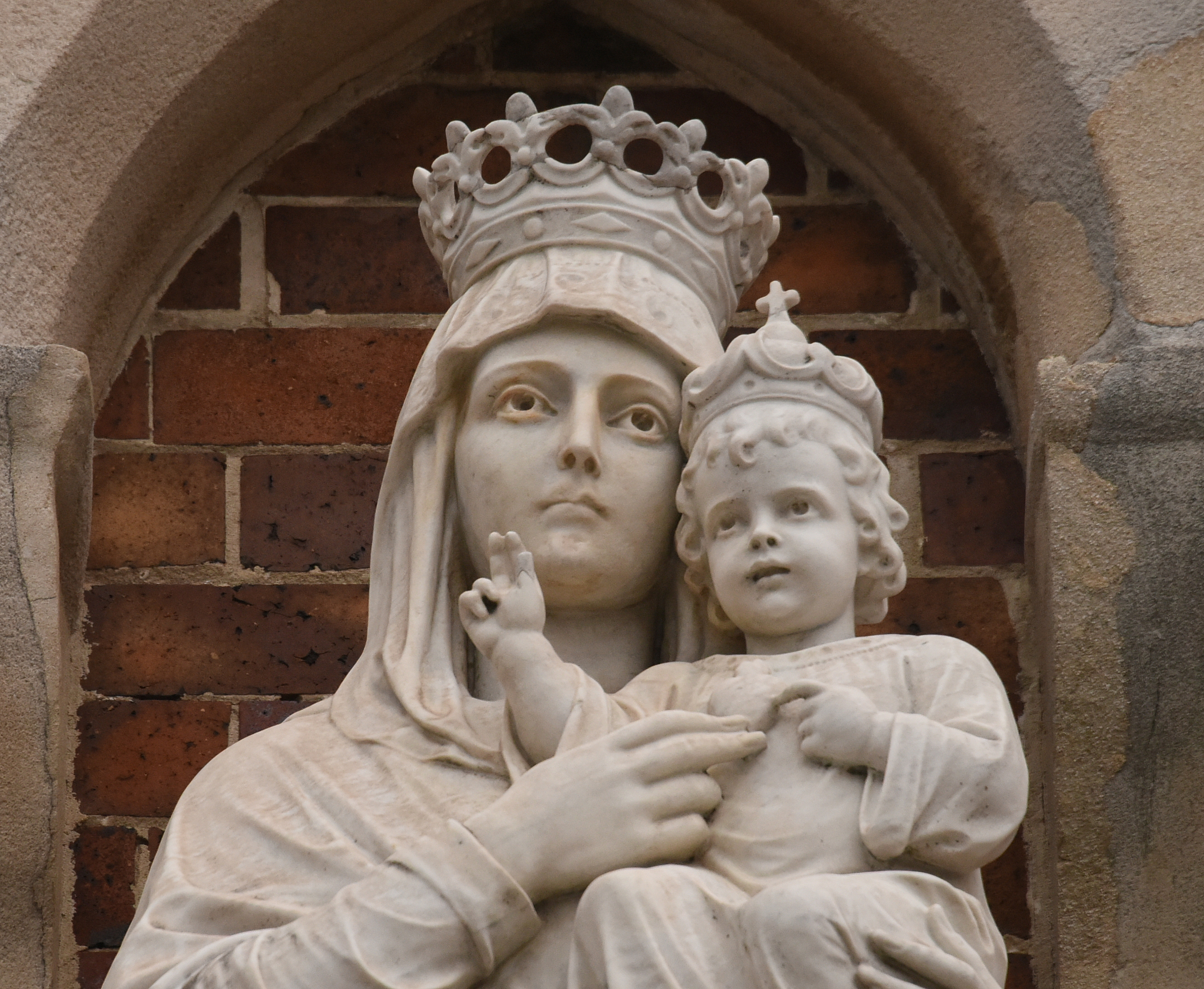

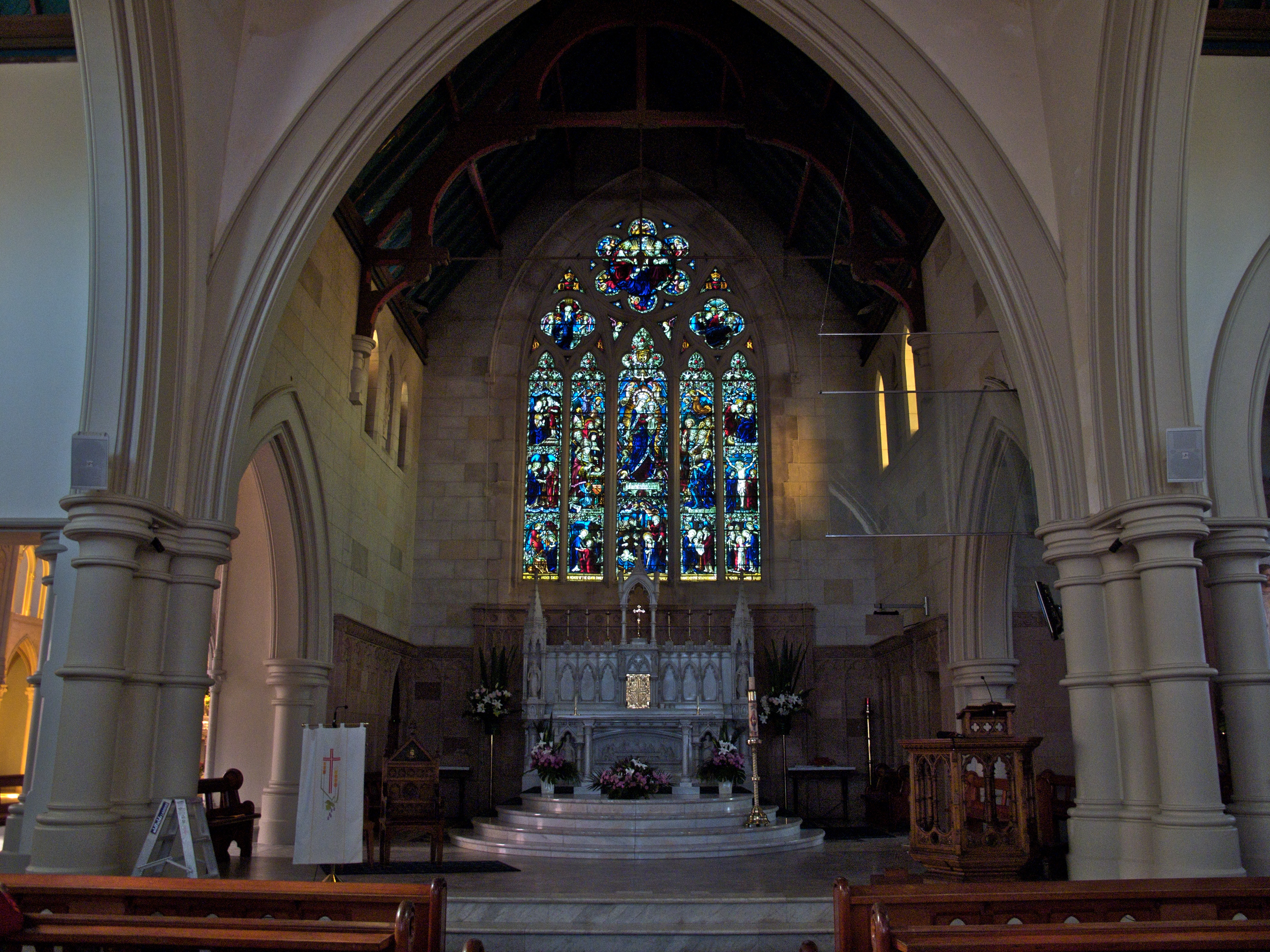

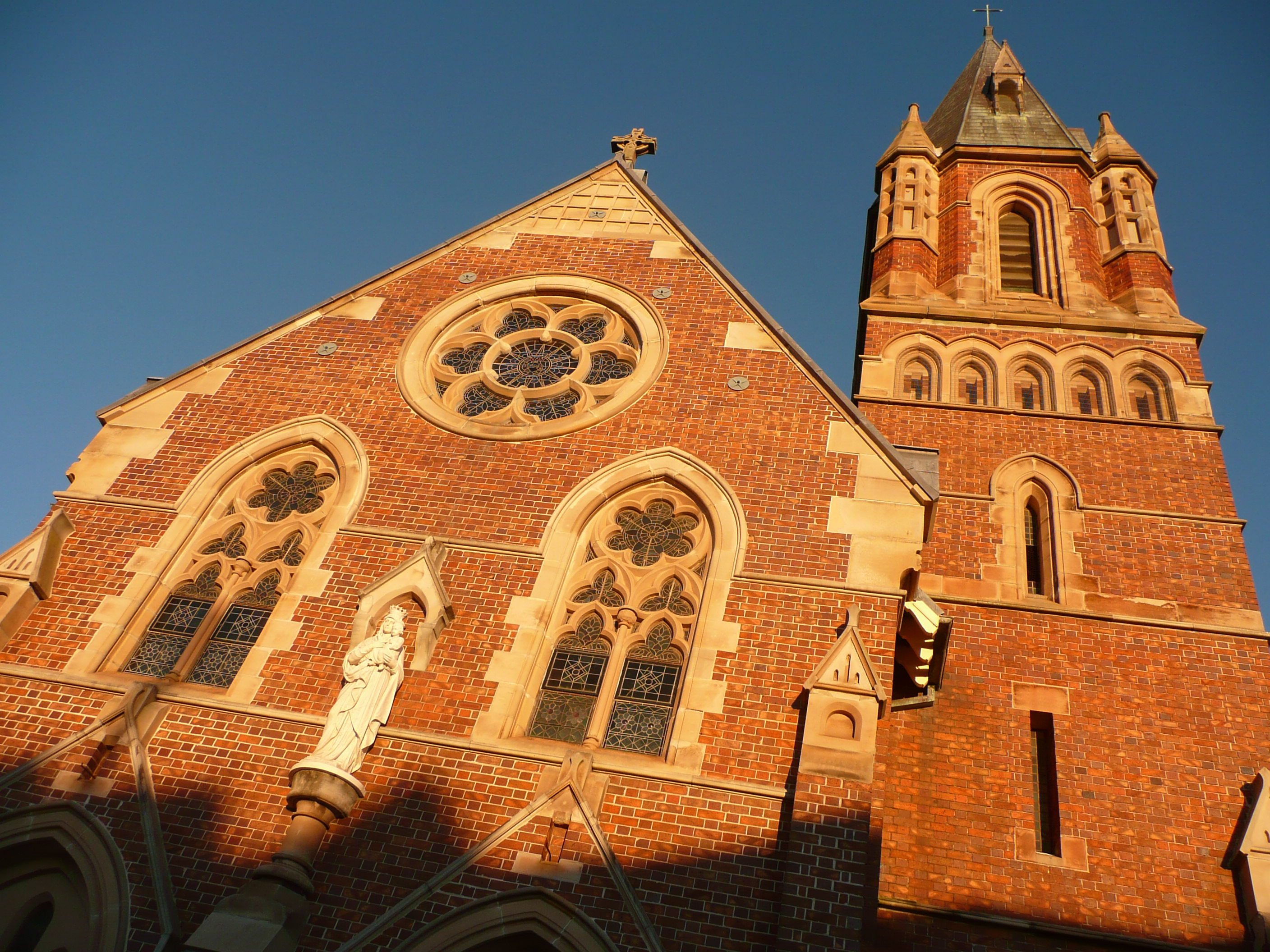

== See also ==
- Roman Catholicism in Australia
