= St Jude's Church, Randwick =

St Jude's Church
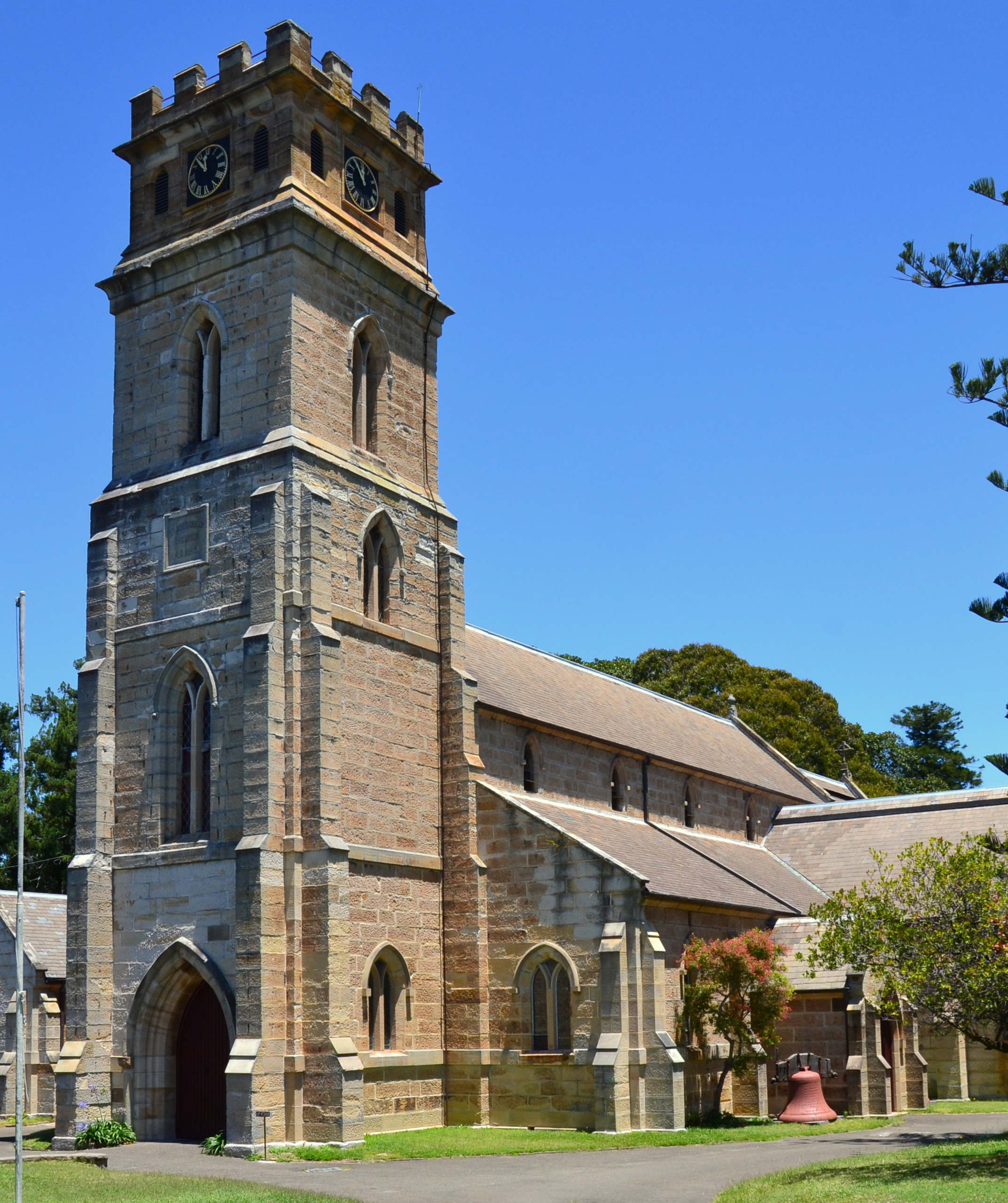

- Location in Greater Sydney
- 33°54′43″S 151°14′33″E
- Location: 106 Avoca Street, Randwick, Sydney, New South Wales
- Country: Australia
- Denomination: Anglican Church of Australia
- Website: stjudesrandwick.org.au

History
- Status: Church
- Founded: 1857
- Founder: Simeon Pearce
- Dedicated: 21 May 1861
- Consecrated: 28 July 1865

Architecture
- Functional status: Active
- Architects: Edmund Blacket (co-attrib.); Simeon Pearce (co-attrib.); Henry M. Robinson
- Architectural type: Gothic Revival
- Years built: 1861–1865

Specifications
- Capacity: 400

Administration
- Province: New South Wales
- Diocese: Sydney
- Parish: Randwick

Clergy
- Rector: Rev. Andrew Schmidt
St Jude's graveyard
- Interactive map of St Jude's graveyard
Details
- Location: The Avenue, Randwick
- Size: .96 ha (2.4 acres)
- Website: https://www.stjudesrandwick.org.au/cemetery/
- Find a Grave: St Jude's graveyard

New South Wales Heritage Register
- Official name: St. Jude's Anglican Church, Cemetery, Rectory, Vergers Residence
- Type: State heritage (complex / group)
- Criteria: a., c., d., f., g.
- Designated: 2 April 1999
- Reference no.: 00012
- Type: Church
- Category: Religion

The St Jude's Church is an active Anglican church in Randwick, a suburb of Sydney, New South Wales, Australia. It is part of a significant heritage group that includes the church, cemetery, rectory and original Randwick Borough Chambers, later converted to church use. The group is located on Avoca Street, Randwick, and has a federal heritage listing. It was added to the New South Wales State Heritage Register on 2 April 1999.

== History ==
=== Indigenous history ===
Pre-1780s the local Aboriginal people in the area used the site for fishing and cultural activities; rock engravings, grinding grooves and middens remain in evidence. In 1789 Governor Arthur Phillip referred to "a long bay", which became known as Long Bay. Aboriginal people are believed to have inhabited the Sydney region for at least 20,000 years. The population of Aboriginal people between Palm Beach and Botany Bay in 1788 has been estimated to have been 1500. Those living south of Port Jackson to Botany Bay were the Cadigal people who spoke Dharug, while the local clan name of Maroubra people was "Muru-ora-dial". By the mid nineteenth century the traditional owners of this land had typically either moved inland in search of food and shelter, or had died as the result of European disease or confrontation with British colonisers.

=== Colonial history ===
One of the earliest land grants in this area was made in 1824 to Captain Francis Marsh, who received 12 acres bounded by the present Botany and High Streets, Alison and Belmore Roads. In the 1830s land purchases were made at Little Coogee by William Wentworth and William C. Grenville, a clerk in the Colonial Secretary's Office. In 1839 William Newcombe acquired the land north-west of the present town hall in Avoca Street.

Randwick takes its name from the town of Randwick, Gloucestershire, England. The name was suggested by Simeon Pearce (1821–86) and his brother James. Simeon was born in the English Randwick and the brothers were responsible for the early development of both Randwick and its neighbour, Coogee. Simeon had come to the colony in 1841as a 21 year old surveyor. He built his Blenheim House on the 4 acres he bought from Marsh, and called his property "Randwick". The brothers bought and sold land profitably in the area and elsewhere. Simeon campaigned for construction of a road from the city to Coogee (achieved in 1853) and promoted the incorporation of the suburb. Pearce sought construction of a church modelled on the church of St. John in his birthplace. In 1857 the first St Jude's stood on the site of the present post office, at the corner of the present Alison Road and Avoca Street.

Randwick was slow to progress. The village was isolated from Sydney by swamps and sandhills, and although a horse-drawn omnibus was operated by a man named Grice from the late 1850s, the journey was more a test of nerves than a pleasure jaunt. Wind blew sand over the track, and the bus sometimes became bogged, so that passengers had to get out and push it free. From its early days Randwick had a divided society. The wealthy lived elegantly in large houses built when Pearce promoted Randwick and Coogee as a fashionable area. But the market gardens, orchards and piggeries that continued alongside the large estates were the lot of the working class. Even on the later estates that became racing empires, many jockeys and stablehands lived in huts or even under canvas. An even poorer group were the immigrants who existed on the periphery of Randwick in a place called Irishtown, in the area now known as The Spot, around the junction of St.Paul's Street and Perouse Road. Here families lived in makeshift houses, taking on the most menial tasks in their struggle to survive.

In 1858 when the NSW Government passed the Municipalities Act, enabling formation of municipal districts empowered to collect rates and borrow money to improve their suburb, Randwick was the first suburb to apply for the status of a municipality. It was approved in February 1859, and its first Council was elected in March 1859.

Randwick had been the venue for sporting events, as well as duels and illegal sports, from the early days in the colony's history. Its first racecourse, the Sandy Racecourse or Old Sand Track, had been a hazardous track over hills and gullies since 1860. When a move was made in 1863 by John Tait, to establish Randwick Racecourse, Simeon Pearce was furious, especially when he heard that Tait also intended to move into Byron Lodge. Tait's venture prospered, however and he became the first person in Australia to organise racing as a commercial sport. The racecourse made a big difference to the progress of Randwick. The omnibus gave way to trams that linked the suburb to Sydney and civilisation. Randwick soon became a prosperous and lively place, and it still retains a busy residential, professional and commercial life.

Today, some of the houses have been replaced by home units. Many European migrants have made their homes in the area, along with students and workers at the nearby University of NSW and the Prince of Wales Hospital.

=== St. Jude's Church of England ===
The site was originally a portion of a grant issued to Captain Francis Marsh, an officer of Her Majesty's 80th Regiment of Foot, on 21 September 1847, being a portion of 4.9 hectares (12 acres) (bounded by the present day Botany & High Streets, Alison & Belmore Roads) offered "as part liquidation of a remission of A£200 allowed to him as a Captain in the regiment." Captain Marsh sold his grant of land to George Hooper, a market gardener who erected a building and set about cultivating some of the land. Hooper also possessed extensive holdings adjoining what is now Queen's Park and had erected a stone house which stands in Gilderthorpe Avenue. On 21 September 1847, Simeon Pearce purchased 1.6 hectares (4 acres) from George Hooper for £20. He subsequently sought from and was granted by the Government in 1854, a block of land in Avoca Street, next to the land previously purchased. This grant was for the purpose of erecting a school, church and parsonage.

Simeon Pearce was a prominent and enthusiastic lay worker for the Church of England in New South Wales. He had considerable influence throughout the community and was devoted to church activities and associated charities. He was also a very shrewd, ambitious and hard employer. Church services were held in Pearce's residence, Blenheim House, until the completion of St. Jude's Church. It was the express wish of three trustees to the land grant, Simeon Pearce, S. Hebblewhite and W. B. Holdsworthy that a larger and more imposing church be erected when funds became available and the population justified it.

Differing views exist as to who was the architect for St Jude's. Simeon Pearce has been suggested, as well as Edmund Blacket. The central tower and buttressed side aisles were said to be inspired by the Parish Church of St. John in Randwick, Gloucestershire. The foundation stone was laid on 25 May 1861 by either The Rt. Rev. Dr. Frederick Barker or by Canon Allwood, the then Rector of St. James Church, King Street, Sydney.

St. Jude's Cemetery opened in 1853 as part of a larger cemetery grant for all denominations. Public agitation against the possible pollution of Sydney's water supply caused the closure of the other sections in the 1860s, however St. Jude's remained.

The cemetery is older than the present church building. The earliest date discernable on tombstones is 1843, but it is believed that some of the graves could be much older. Many well-known early settlers are buried in this graveyard, including NSW Colonial Secretary Edward Deas, Sir Alfred Stephen and bushranger Ben Hall's pursuer Sir Frederick Pottinger.

It is a veritable roll call of the rich and famous in the late 19th century. At least eight religious ministers are memorialised, including Archdeadon William Cowper (d.1858) whose remains were reinterred from the Devonshire Street Anglican Cemetery. Notable graves include Ann Hordern (c1793-1871), the wife of Anthony Hordern of the retail empire Anthony Hordern & Son; civil servant, land agent and "father of Randwick", Simeon Henry Pearce (1821-1886); and Chief Justice of the Supreme Court and legislator, Sir Alfred Stephen (1802–94). Other prominent citizens and families of the 19th century buried here include pastoralist, politician, son of John Busby of 'Busby's Bore' fame, William Busby (1813–87); Benjamin Darley, The Reverend Cowper, Sir Frederick Pottinger and merchant, pastoralist and namesake of the suburb of Mosman, whaler Archibald Mosman (1799-1863). His grave is maintained by the Municipality of Mosman. Other notable internees include the judge, politician and chancellor of Sydney University, William Montagu Manning, who was buried at St Jude's in 1895; and colonial administrator, Edward Deas Thomson.

The church has faced some difficulties and controversies over the past 150 years. The famous 'St. Jude's Case' was one. It comprised two cases: the first commenced in 1861. The legal action was to prevent church trustees using proceeds from Frederick Jones' will to construct the second (present) St. Jude's Church. The first case was withdrawn on a technicality. In 1862 the parties returned to the Equity Court. In the end to Judge ruled in favour of the trustees. By then a sizeable proportion of the original bequest had been taken up with legal fees.

In 1862 the verger's residence was built at a cost of A£700 and was designed by Thomas Rowe. It was originally used as the Randwick Council Chamber and Offices. It was purchased by the Church of England in 1895.

Two court cases held to determine the location of the church delayed construction of the church and as a result it was not completed until 29 June 1865. In May 1865 the church organ was ordered from Mr. Walker of Tottenham Road London. It was delivered to Sydney in October 1866. Plans for the rectory commenced in 1866 and it was constructed in 1870. In 1877 the church tower was increased to a height of 22.77 metres for the purpose of housing a chiming clock. The tower also has an excellent peal of eight bells, hung in the tower in 1872. In 1888 the architect Henry M Robinson was asked to add two transepts to blend with the existing building and the original chancel was extended to form a new chancel/sanctuary and provision for an organ chamber. The work was completed in six months and dedicated on 21 September 1889 at a cost of 2800 pounds.

The church was associated with many local identities, including "the Barkers". Frederick Barker was to become the second bishop of Sydney, and Mrs Jane Barker founded St. Catherine's School at Waverley.

The parish hall was constructed in 1899 and initially served as the St. Jude's Day School. Canon Cakebread was rector between 1912 and 1939. In 1921 Mr E. Bossier designed the vestries to commemorate the diamond jubilee of the church. In 1922 the lych gate at the street frontage, directly opposite the main entrance to the church, was constructed. The lych gate and wall were given by Edwin Fieldhouse. In 1955 the columbarium was constructed.

== Description ==
Immediately south of the church is the rectory, a two-storey stone house built in 1870. Immediately north of the church is the original Randwick Borough Chambers, a two-storey sandstone building designed by Thomas Rowe. It was built in 1862 and features Gothic detailing that includes a carved stone head over the front door. It was later acquired by the church to be used as the verger's residence, to be later converted to the St Jude's Parish Centre. Immediately north of the Parish Centre is the School Hall, which is not heritage-listed.

St Jude's has one of the oldest English-style "full circle ringing" bell towers in Australia. Its current ring is of eight bells founded by John Taylor Bellfounders in 2000 with a tenor of 14 hundredweight. The ringers are affiliated with The Australian and New Zealand Association of Bellringers and have been active since and 1864.

St Jude's website has an extended history extracted from the St Jude's Conservation Report.

=== The church ===
A large Victorian Gothic church building constructed of solid masonry walls, performed stone arches, traceried windows and keystones to and about doors and window openings. It is a solid structure with engaged buttresses. The tower is divided by decorative string courses and the transept and chancel ends are gabled with continuous stone copings. The roof is slate with ventilation ridges and copper gutters and downpipes. Flashings to and about parapets and tower are made of lead.

Internally stone arches rise above simple block capital stone piers and the whole is bathed in the warm light of stained glass. The traceried windows are one of the most magnificent aspects of the church and are in memory of such people as Bishop Barker, Archbishop Saumarez Smith, Simeon Pearce, George Kiss, Lady Charlotte Mary See, Canon Cakebread, Rev O.V. Abrams, the Vickers family amongst others. The roof, of stained timber, is supported on trusses the ends of which sit upon stone corbelled "saddle" blocks. Building materials are mainly sandstone and timber although marble has been used in the sanctuary.

The lych gate, located at the street frontage directly opposite the main entrance of the church, is a very simple neat structure sympathetic to its surroundings and being built into and part of, the main stone walls.

=== The rectory ===
A two-storey Victorian Gothic church residence. It is a pleasant asymmetrical design in sandstone, the quoins being articulated. A delicate cast iron verandahed porch marks the entrance and is enclosed at the north by a single storey wing of similar style but apparently built later. The slate gabled roof is decorated by carved barge boards and finials. Windows are of double hung type with flat lintels and generally grouped in pairs.

=== The verger's residence ===
A two-storey sandstone building of symmetrical design. The jerkin-headed slate roof is punctuated by a central octagonal tower over the entrance and roofed with a segmental domed roof and spirelet. The double-hung windows are grouped in pairs and the facade is relieved by a deep striking course and articulated quoins. The keystones in the arched central openings are decorated with carved faces and further interest is given by carved panels in the tower walls

=== The parish hall ===
A large cumbersome building, constructed of red brick and having a corrugated steel and slate roof and timber joinery. Walls are constructed with shaped brick buttresses, windows are tall and lancet shaped. The east elevation has a somewhat Byzantine appearance with semi-circular windows and openings, stone pilasters and string courses and a heavy wrought iron grille to the front entry. Coping courses are stone and/or cement render and stonework has been used to accentuate certain elements in the design.

=== The cemetery ===
The cemetery occupies an area of approximately 0.96 hectares (2.4 acres). It is located behind the church and was in use before the current church was completed. It is sublime in character, well kept, respected and full of interesting characters. The first burial was Edwin David Daintrey, infant son of Edwin and Susan, who died 2/9/1859, just 11 weeks and 3 days old. Freesias (Cape bulbs) have naturalised across the cemetery from original grave plantings. The earliest tomb is dated 1843 but this may have come from another site. The majority of burials occurred between 1865 and 1890s. The last burial was in 1975. There is a small modern brick columbarium on the western side of the cemetery. There is also a memorial garden at the rear.

The graves are arranged in parallel rows, and there is one major pathway axis running from the church, west towards the columbarium. The ground is fairly level with the exception of a small earth bank sloping away on the south side. The majority of monuments are tall, richly carved Victorian designs mostly in sandstone, with very few of marble or granite. Most family plots are surrounded by delicate cast-iron fences. The dominant vegetation is mature Moreton Bay and Port Jackson figs, but there are numerous other trees, including eucalypts and camphor laurels.

The well-heeled residents of the Eastern Suburbs have erected some impressive monuments here. Many of the iron grave surrounds are intact and form a neat catalogue of designs.

National Trust Restoration Appeals – Helping the community to fund important works: St Jude's in Randwick includes the 1865 church, the 1862 original Randwick Borough Chambers, the 1870 Victorian Gothic rectory, 1899 parish school hall and 1850s historic cemetery. Works over time have included repairs to the stonework of the church, rectory and parish hall, and conservation of walls, pillars, window mouldings, slate roofing, bells, clock tower, organ, timber, tiling, pressed metal, flooring, paths, stone paving, ceilings, fencing and stained glass windows. Parishioners have responded generously to annual appeals for help, donating around $100,00 each year. Uses now include housing, a child care centre and new parish room, all sympathetic to the heritage of the site. The trust fund and "bite-sized" approach has enabled much to be achieved. Major works planned over the next three years include re-doing the church lighting, repointing the child care centre building (parish school hall) and stonework restoration of the upper section of the bell and clock tower.

=== Condition ===
As at 1 October 1997, the physical condition is good. Archaeological potential is low.

=== Modifications and dates ===
- 1853 – cemetery opened
- 1861 – foundation stone laid
- 1862 – verger's residence constructed
- 1865 – church completed
- 1866 – church organ delivered
- 1870 – rectory constructed
- 1877 – tower increased in height and chiming clock installed
- 1889 – extensive alterations
- 1899 – parish hall constructed
- 1927 – vestry added
- 1955 – columbarium constructed

== Heritage listing ==
As at 26 October 2004, the St Jude's precinct and buildings show an uninterrupted progression of history from approximately 1861 to 1899. The precinct has strong links with the founder of Randwick, Simeon Pearce and with the Municipality of Randwick. The precinct is one of the best maintained and clearly visible examples of the early colonial concept, further romanticised in the work of Edmund Blacket, of transposing a typically soft English churchyard scene to the harsh Australian environment. The buildings and the precinct display a perfect unity, possibly unmatched anywhere in the Sydney Metropolitan Area and the whole represents an almost perfect example of a typical English village churchyard, unspoilt by the passage of time. The cemetery is one of the best maintained Victorian cemeteries and inspiring places in the Sydney region. St Jude's Church and precinct is a witness to the whole of the history of Randwick, its emergence as a suburb and its growth into a community. The church building particularly is a clear landmark in Randwick and beyond.

St Jude's Church, Randwick, was listed on the New South Wales State Heritage Register on 2 April 1999 having satisfied the following criteria.

The place is important in demonstrating the course, or pattern, of cultural or natural history in New South Wales.

The St Jude's precinct and buildings show an uninterrupted progression of history from approximately 1861 to 1899. The precinct has strong links with the founder of Randwick, Simeon Pearce and with the Municipality of Randwick. The precinct is one of the best maintained and clearly visible examples of the early colonial concept, further romanticised in the work of Edmund Blacket, of transposing a typically soft English churchyard scene to the harsh Australian environment.

The place is important in demonstrating aesthetic characteristics and/or a high degree of creative or technical achievement in New South Wales.

The buildings and the precinct display a perfect unity, possibly unmatched anywhere in the Sydney Metropolitan Area and the whole represents an almost perfect example of a typical English village churchyard, unspoilt by the passage of time. The cemetery is one of the best maintained Victorian cemeteries and inspiring places in the Sydney Region. The church with its tower is a dominant building and has much appeal and value to the adjoining parks and streets.

The place has a strong or special association with a particular community or cultural group in New South Wales for social, cultural or spiritual reasons.

St Jude's Church and precinct is a witness to the whole of the history of Randwick, its emergence as a suburb and its growth into a community. The church building particularly is a clear landmark in Randwick and beyond.

== Gallery ==
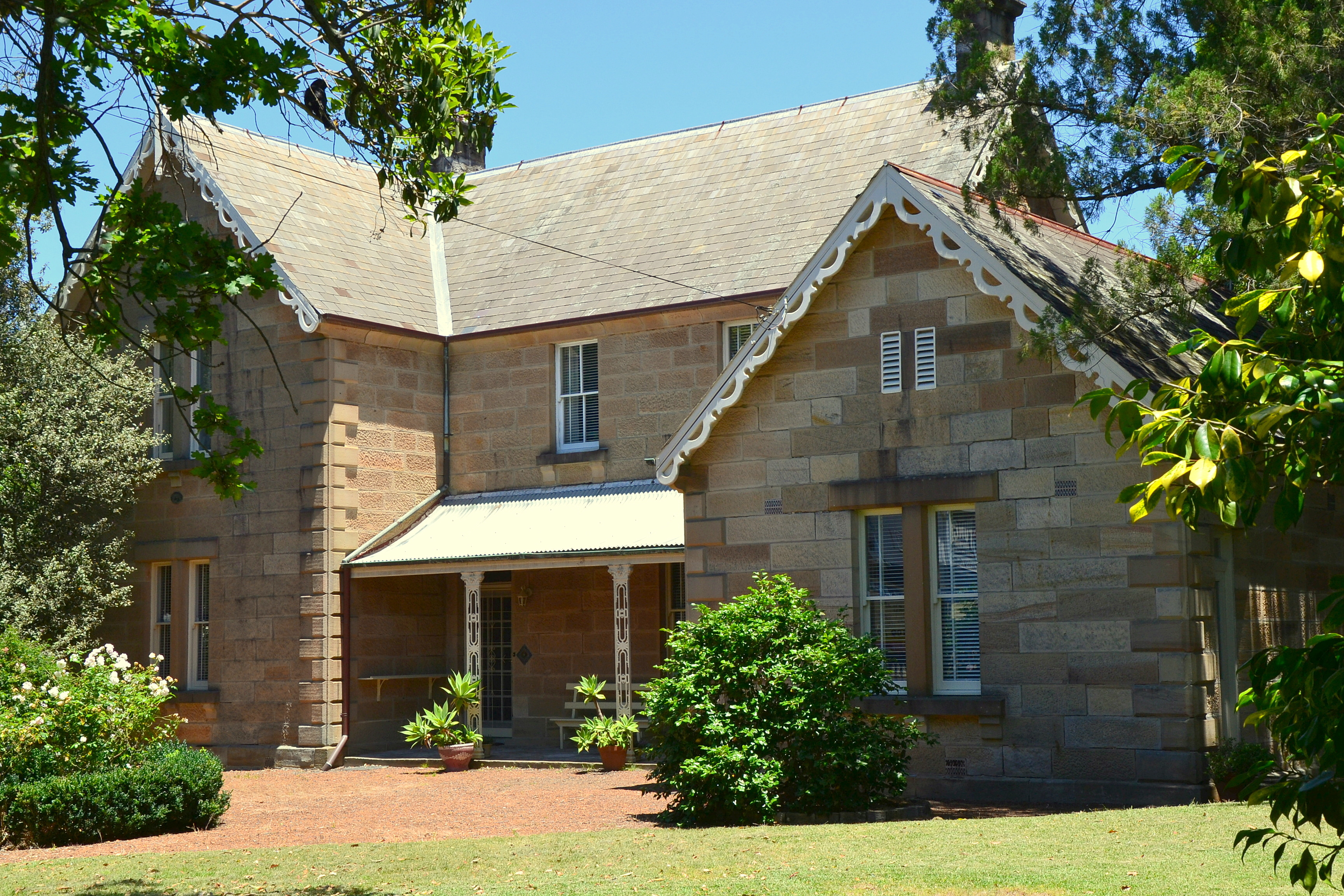
St Jude's Rectory

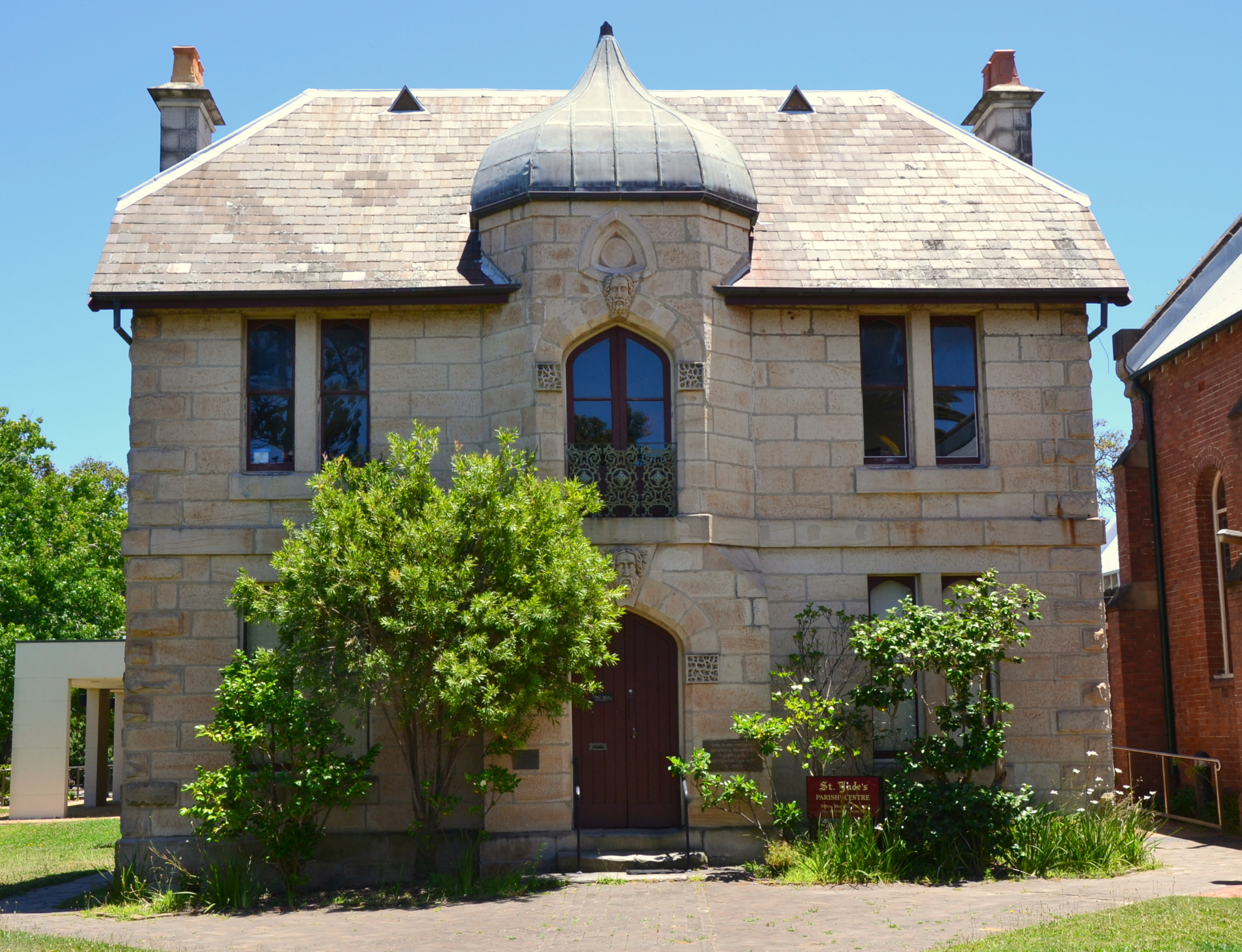
Former Borough Chambers, later acquired by St Jude's

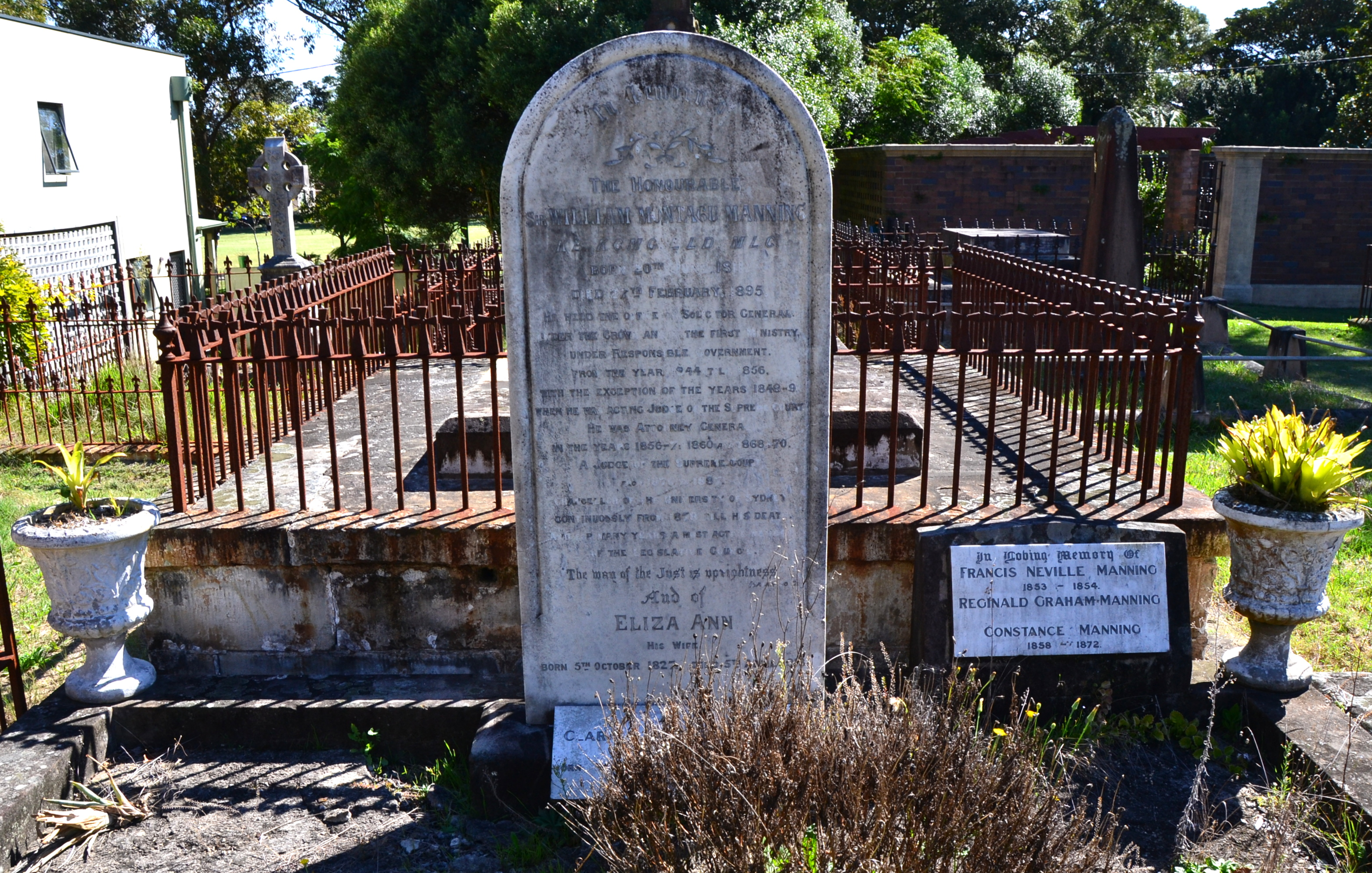
Grave of William Montagu Manning

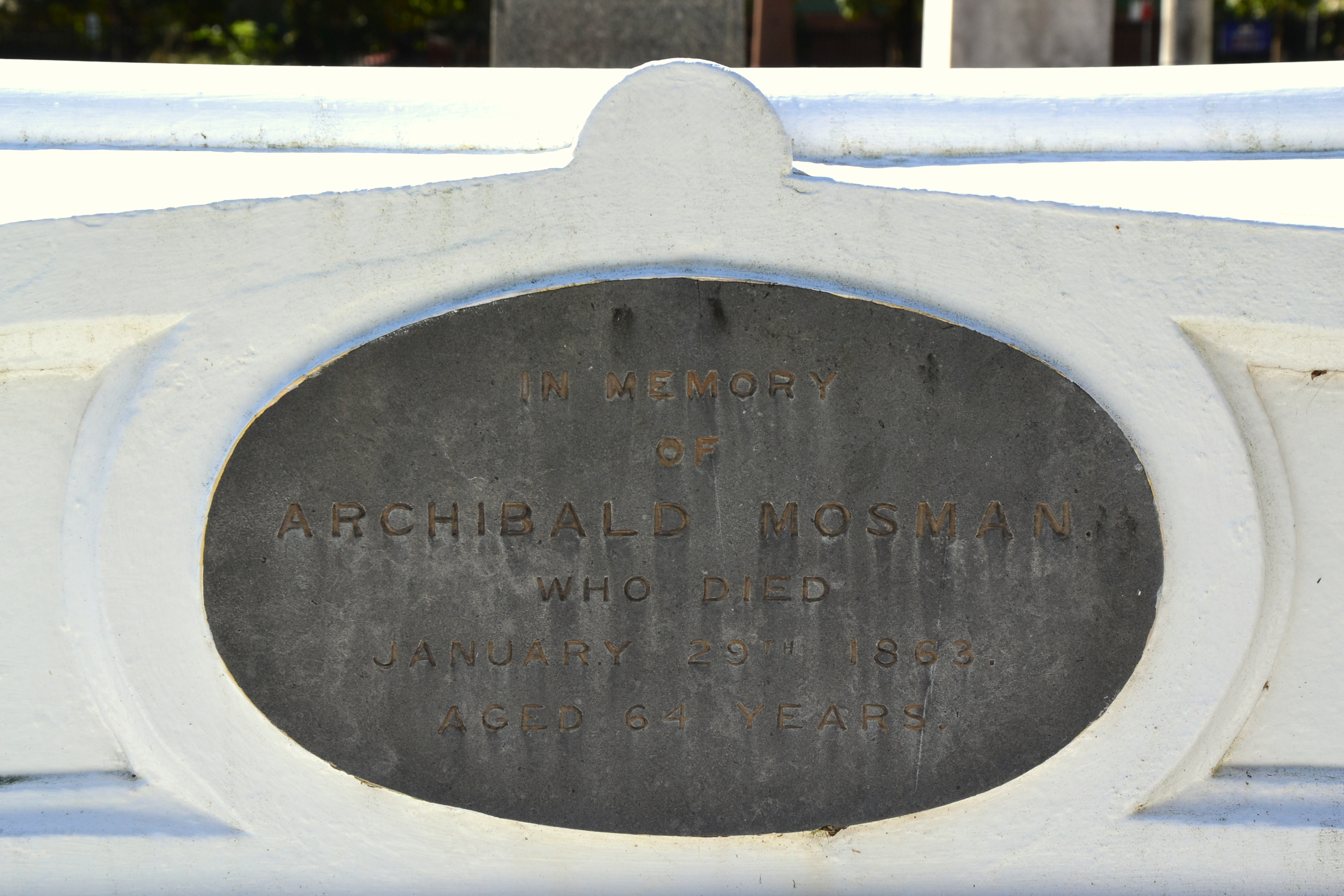
Grave of Archibald Mosman

== See also ==
- List of Anglican churches in the Diocese of Sydney
- Australian non-residential architectural styles
