= Redleaf =

Historical building in Sydney, New South Wales

RedLeaf
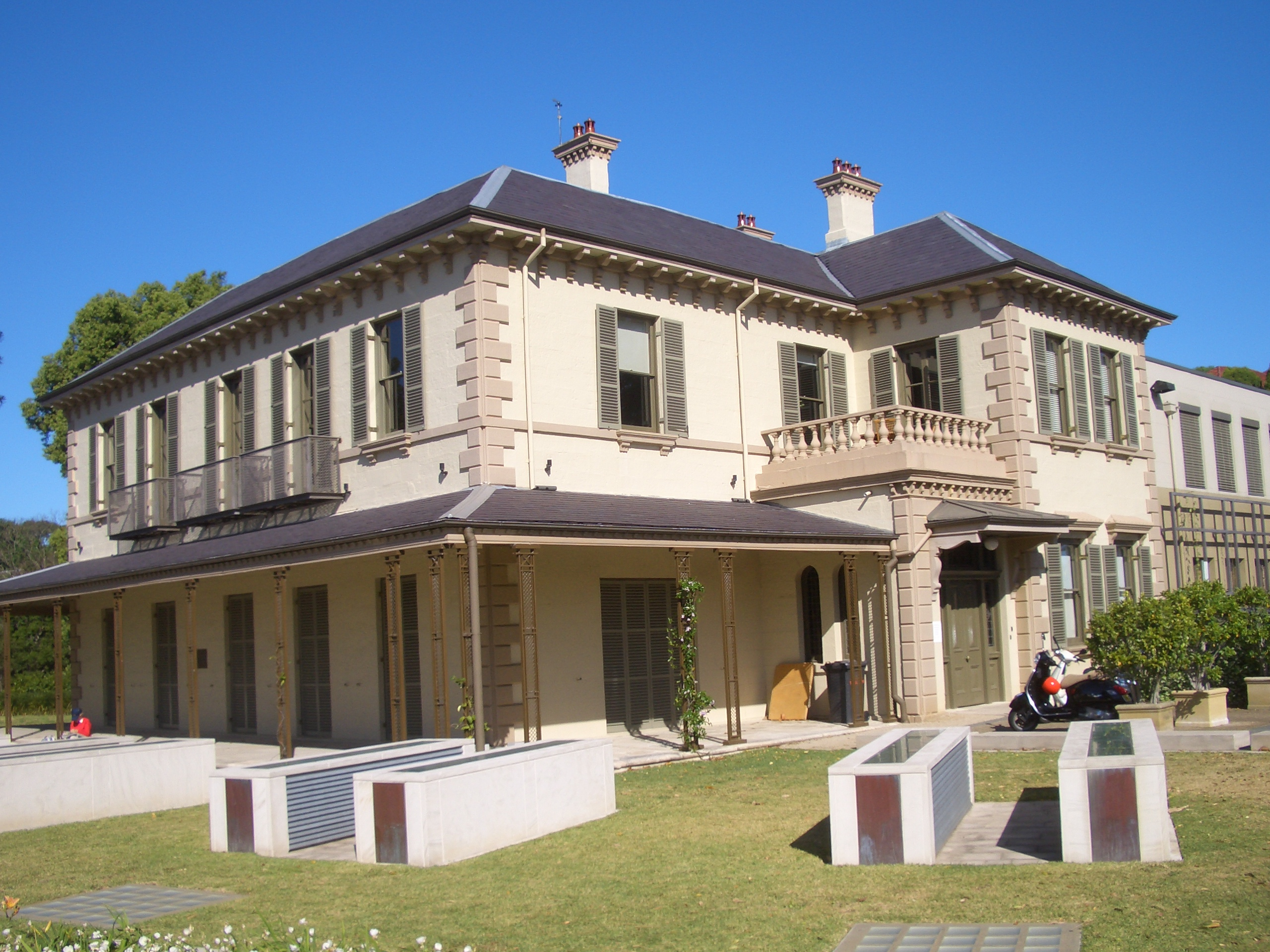
- RedLeaf; now the Woollahra Council Chambers
- Interactive map of the RedLeaf area
- Alternative names: Woollahra Council Chambers

General information
- Status: Completed
- Architectural style: Victorian Italianate
- Location: New South Head Road, Double Bay, Sydney, New South Wales, Australia
- Coordinates: 33.8726°S 151.2476°E
- Completed: 1863; 163 years ago
- Client: William Benjamin Walker
- Owner: Municipality of Woollahra

Design and construction
- Architect: George Allen Mansfield

New South Wales Heritage Database (Local Government Register)
- Official name: “RedLeaf”—Woollahra Council Chambers and interiors, gates, gateposts, Moreton Bay Fig, Bunya Pine
- Type: Built
- Designated: 23 May 2015
- Reference no.: 212

RedLeaf is a historical building that was a private residence and now serves as an administration building, located on New South Head Road, Double Bay, Sydney, Australia. Built in 1863 in the Victorian Italianate style, the building has served as the administration offices for the Municipality of Woollahra since the 1940s and is also known as the Woollahra Council Chambers. The building and its environs are listed on the Municipality of Woollahra local government heritage register.

== Previous occupants ==
=== Commodore William Walker ===
William Benjamin Walker (1820-1889) was the first Commodore of the Royal Sydney Yacht Squadron. Walker commissioned the architect George Allen Mansfield to build RedLeaf in 1863. Born in 1820 in Parramatta, the son of William Walker (1787-1854), a Scottish merchant who traded in NSW and London. Walker (junior) was described by some as "a merchant prince". Walker (senior) established the firm William Walker and Co. in the 1820s and engaged family members as shareholders to run the firm in Australia while he mostly lived in England. Walker (senior) also acquired large tracts of land in NSW one of which was Kameruka, near Bega, where he built Kameruka Homestead.

Walker (junior) became one of his father's agents in Australia and married Elizabeth Corientia Browne in 1845 in Victoria. The couple went to live on the Kameruka Estate after their marriage. His wife, Elizabeth, was the sister of Thomas Alexander Browne, better known as the author, Rolf Boldrewood. Walker (junior) was renowned for living the life of the English country gentleman and is described by Rolf Boldrewood who visited them. He said:

They lived the happy untrammelled free life of the Australian Squire for such in effect is the status and surroundings of the pastoral proprietor of flocks and herds colloquially termed a Squatter. And the large stock holder with his herd of cattle, his flocks of sheep, his stud of well-bred horses lived much the same sort of life as his English precursor, the Lord of the Manor.

Mary Braidwood Mowle also visited them on their Kameruka property and described Elizabeth as "a pretty looking English woman with bright sparkling eyes and lady like unaffected manners". William was said to be "altogether an agreeable lively companion".

They later bought some land at Double Bay and in 1863 built RedLeaf. Walker (junior) was an enthusiastic sportsman and he organised a meeting of 19 yachtsmen in his office and they decided to form a club which was subsequently called the Royal Sydney Yacht Squadron. Walker became the club's first Commodore. He was also a Member of the NSW Legislative Assembly between 1863 and 1867. The family did not live at RedLeaf for long. They were obliged to leave in 1867 and return to England to live permanently. The house was rented from 1867 to 1872 to Henry Cary Dangar and his family.

=== Henry Cary Dangar ===
Henry Cary Dangar (1830-1917) was born in 1830 in Port Stephens. His father was Henry Dangar (1796-1861) who was an early pioneer and wealthy pastoralist. Henry (junior) was educated in England at Cambridge University and became a lawyer. He returned to Sydney but did not continue to practice law and instead followed his father into pastoral pursuits and was a famous breeder of race horses. In 1865 Henry married Lucy Jane Lamb (1841-1914), the daughter of Captain John Lamb, a naval officer, politician and merchant. Soon after their marriage they rented Redleaf for about five years. They then moved to Grantham in Potts Point.

In 1873 John Gray Brewster and his wife Frances rented Redleaf for two years. Brewster was a stock and station agent who owned the firm, Brewster and Trebeck.

=== William Busby ===
William Busby and his wife Catherine bought Redleaf in c. 1875. Busby was born in 1813 in England and came with his family to Australia at the age of 11. His father was John Busby, a Government official. He and his brother, Alexander, became pastoralists and William acquired a very large property near Cassilis which he called Dalkeith. It became a notable horse stud.

In 1856 Busby married Catherine Anne Woore, twenty three years his junior. Catherine's father was Thomas Woore who owned a property called Pomeroy, near Goulburn. The couple had four sons and eight daughters. In 1867 Busby became a member of the NSW Legislative Assembly and held this position until his death. He was active in the Royal Agricultural Society of New South Wales, a director of the Mercantile Bank of Sydney; and a foundation member of the Australian Club in Sydney. In 1875, he was elected a member of the Royal Society of New South Wales.

When Busby died in 1887, Redleaf was placed on the market and the Lassetter family bought the house and moved in c. 1892.

=== Frederic Lassetter ===
Frederic Lassetter (1828-1911) was born in 1828 in Taunton, England. He came to Australia with his family in 1832 at the age of four. They moved to Launceston, Tasmania and his father who was a Wesleyan Minister opened a school.

In 1850 he went to Sydney and joined the firm of his uncle Lancelot Iredale which was called L. Iredale and Company. This firm had been foundered in 1820 and was a hardware and general merchandise store in George Street. Two years later he married his cousin, Charlotte Hannah Iredale. The couple had four sons and two daughters. Over the next ten years Lassetter worked to develop the firm and in 1863 it was renamed F. Lasseter and Co. which was later to become one of the biggest department stores in Sydney employing over 1000 workers.

In 1897 he built a house next to RedLeaf called St Brigids for his son, Arthur Bowring Lassetter (1868-1935) and his new wife, Mabel Annie Slater (1865-1941). The couple had been married the previous year. Arthur was a lawyer who had been educated at Cambridge University.

Lassetter (senior) died in 1911 and Redleaf was sold in 1913 to Thomas Storie Dixon (1886-1916). However Thomas died three years later in France during the War. The house was again sold and bought by William Hooke Mackay.

=== William Hooke Mackay ===
William Hooke Mackay (1858-1939) was born in 1858 in Dungog. His father was John Kenneth Mackay (1828-1909), a wealthy pastoralist who owned the station Cangon near Dungog. Mackay (junior) also became a grazier and lived on the property Anambah, near Maitland. He bred racing horses and owned a famous winner called Beauford. In 1885 he married Adelaide Ann Hooke (1865-1922) who was his cousin. The couple had seven children – four sons and three daughters. All of their four sons volunteered for service during World War I and returned home to pursue pastoral pursuits.

Mackay amassed considerable wealth and bought Redleaf at the age of 60 as a place of retirement. He died there at the age of 81 in 1939 and the house was bought by Woollahra Council. For the first five years they rented the property to Mrs Annie Hall who turned it into a venue for weddings, parties and other events. It later became the Council Chambers and still serves this function today.

== Gallery ==
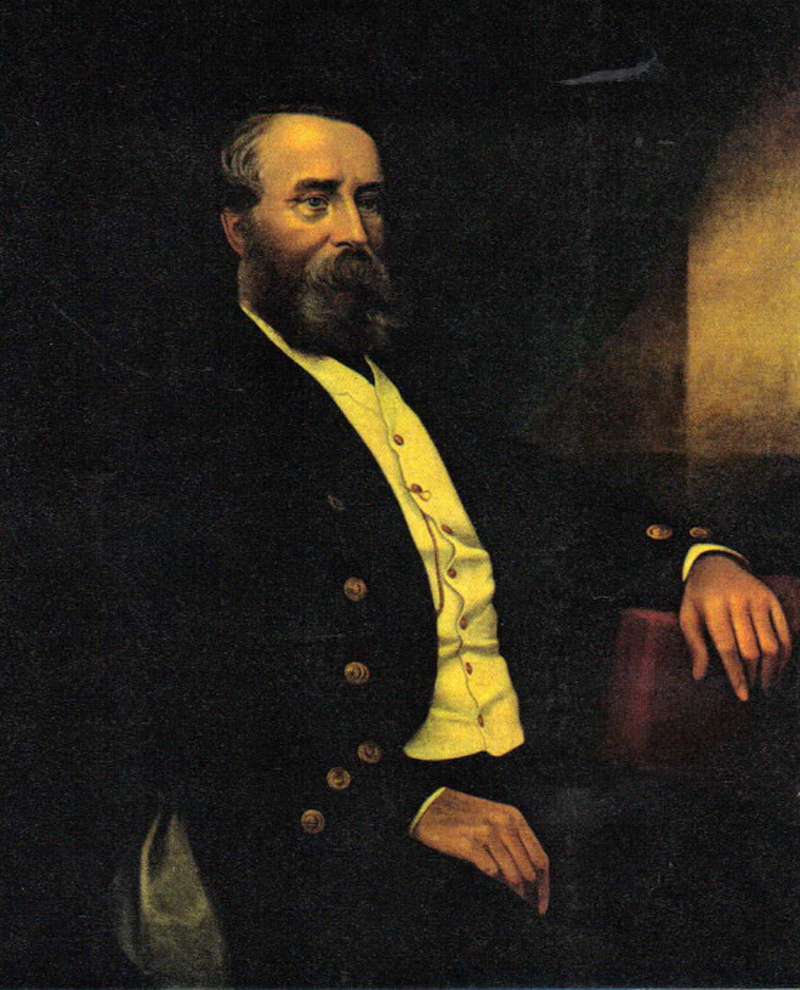
William Benjamin Walker

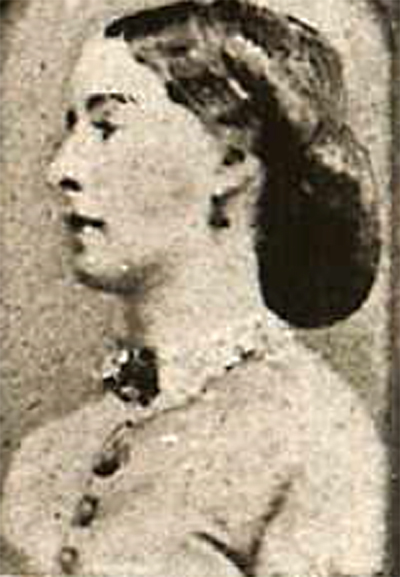
Elizabeth Corientia Browne, wife of William Walker

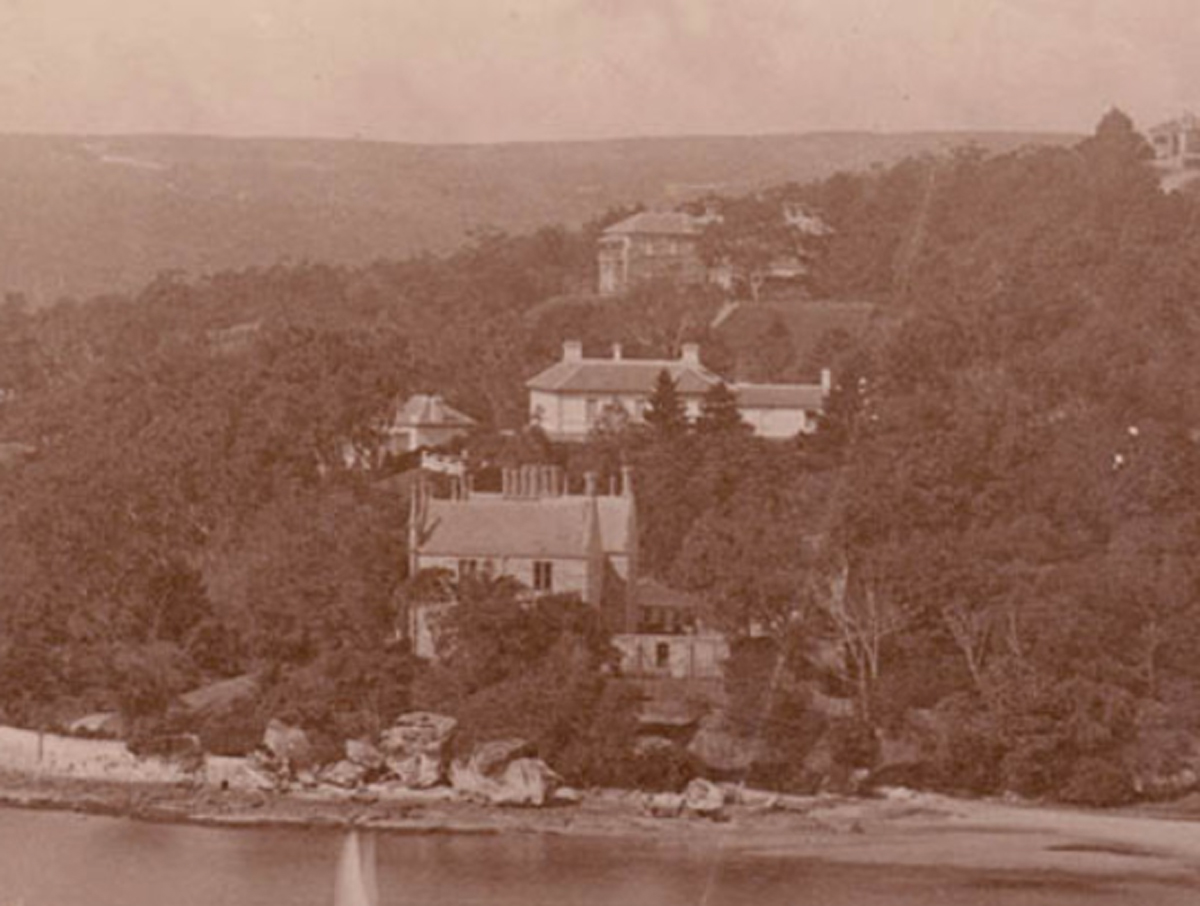
Redleaf (middle house), c. 1880

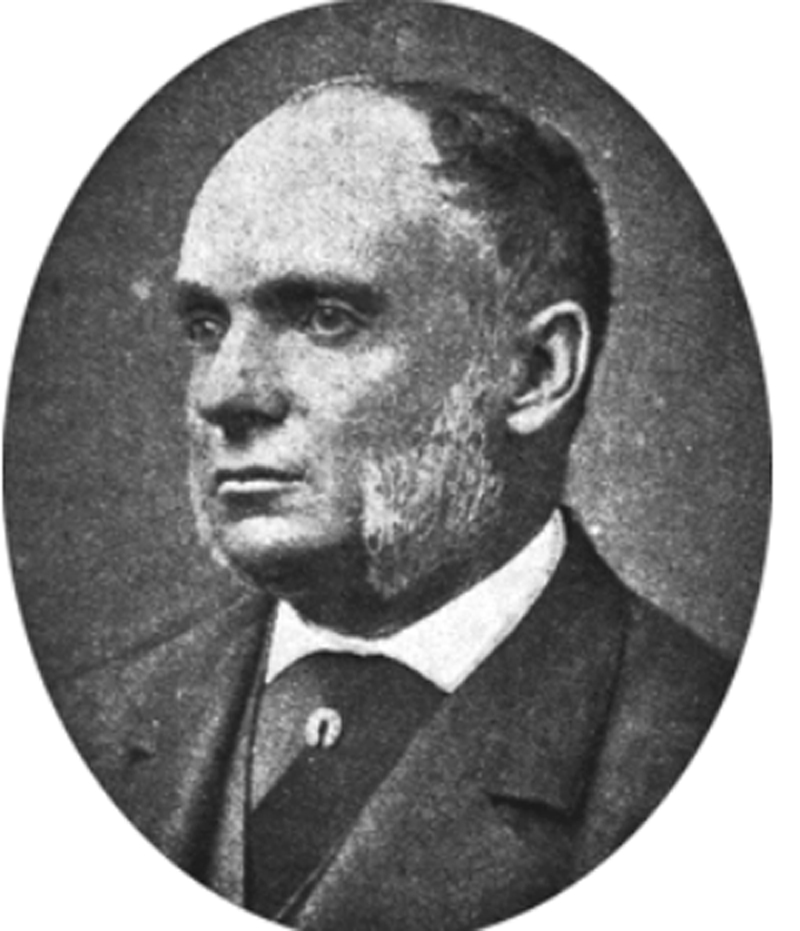
Henry Cary Dangar

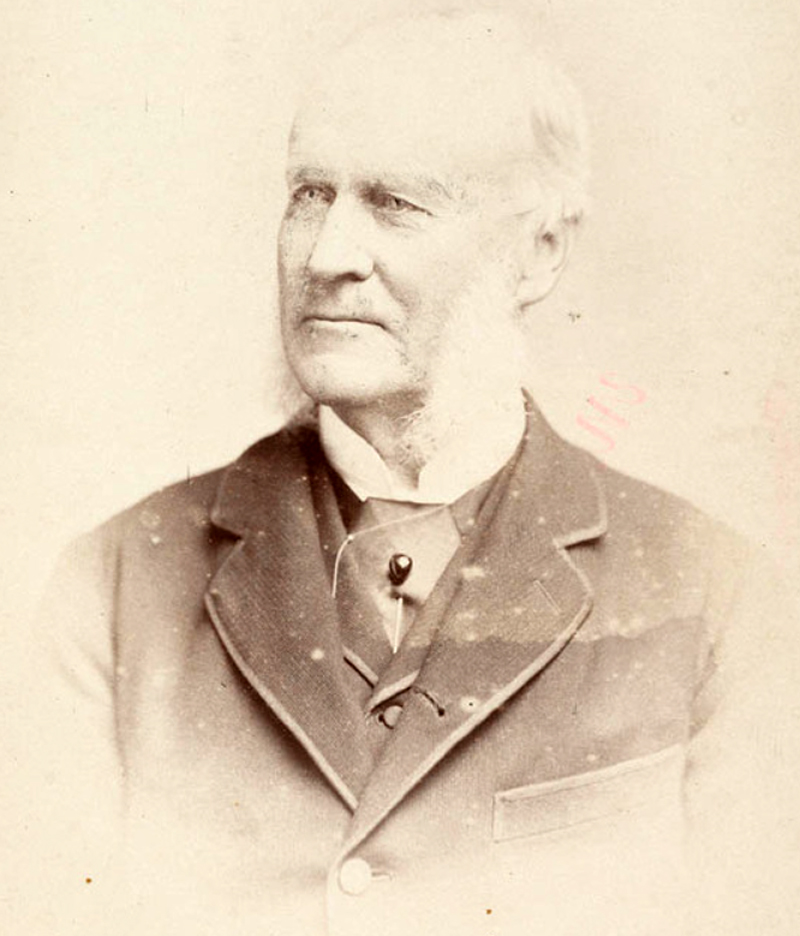
William Busby, c. 1870

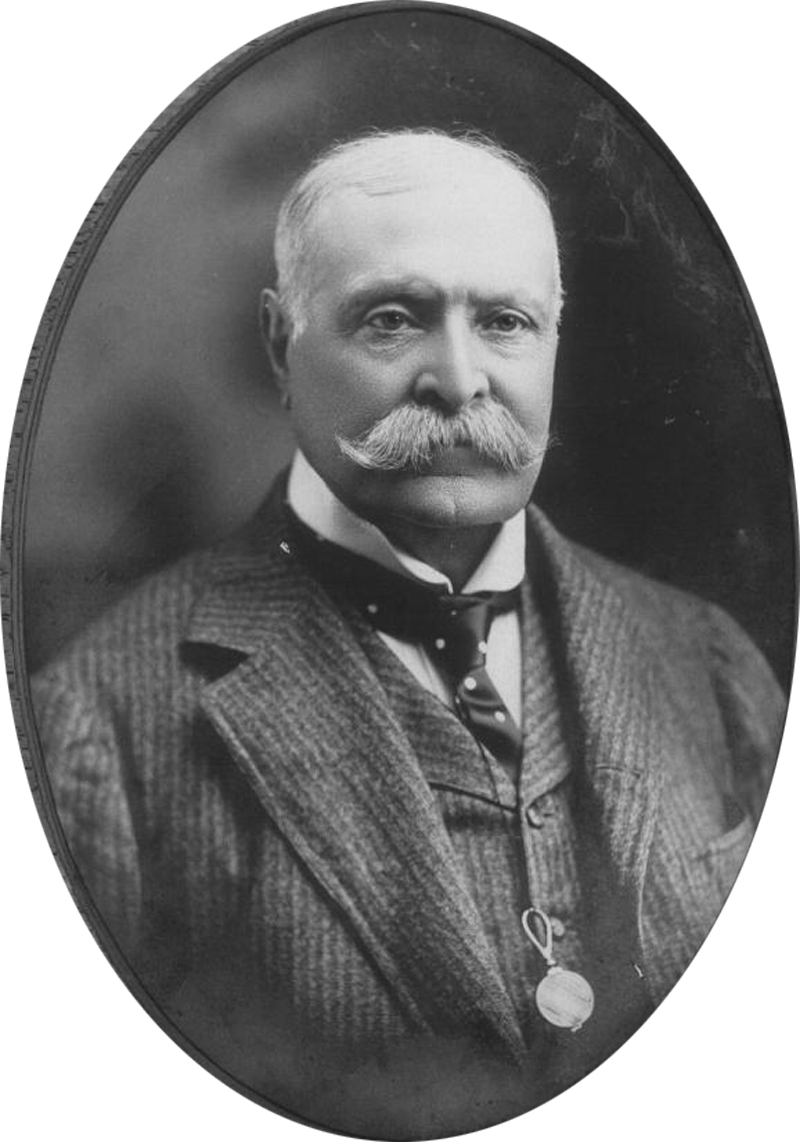
Frederic Lassetter

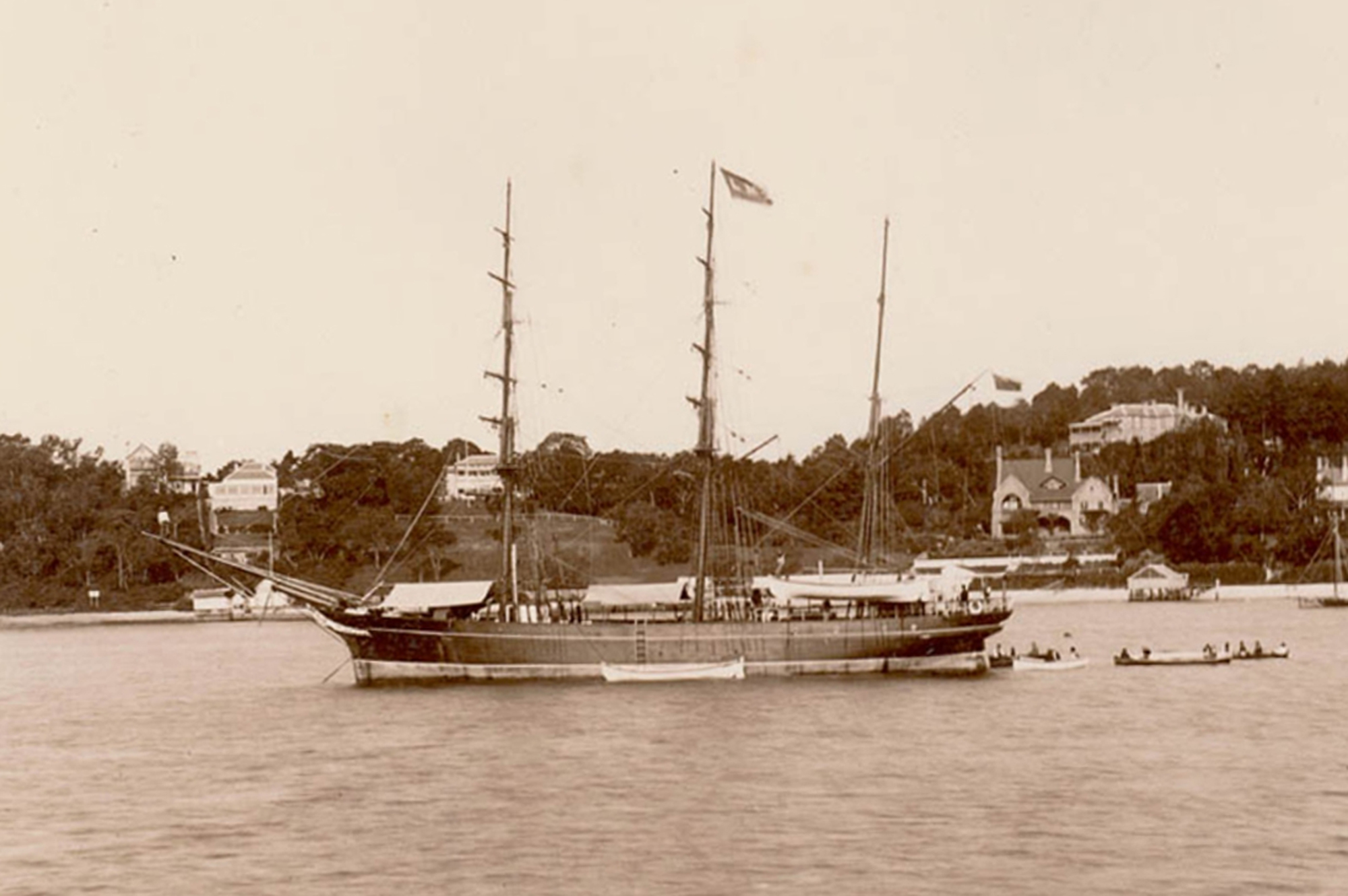
RedLeaf (middle left) and St Bridget's, c. 1900

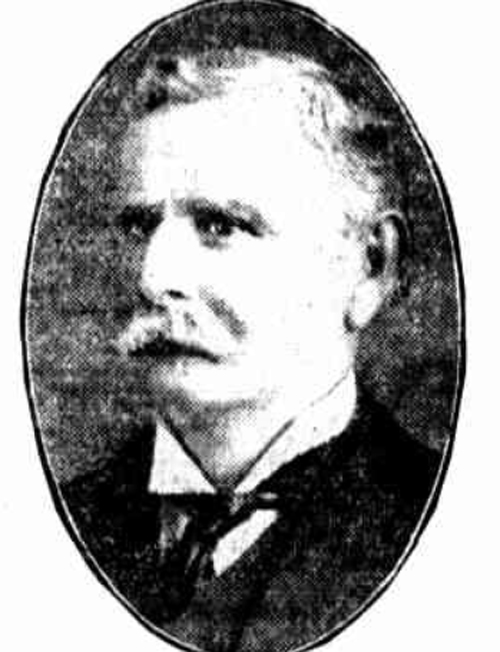
William Hooke Mackay

== See also ==
- Australian residential architectural styles
