= William Busby (politician) =

Australian politician

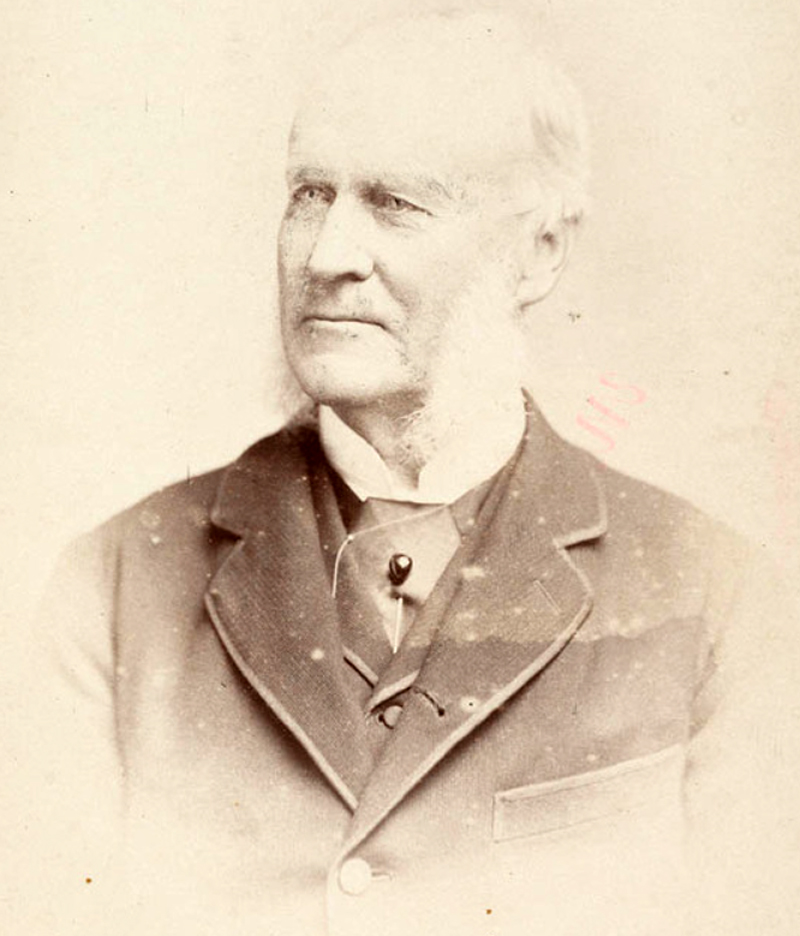
- Born: 15 January 1813; England
- Died: 23 June 1887 (aged 74); Australia
- Resting place: St Jude's Church, Randwick
- Known for: work on Busby's Bore
- Spouse: Catherine Ann Woore
- Relatives: John Busby (father); Thomas Woore (father-in-law)

William Busby (15 January 1813 – 23 June 1887) was an English-born Australian politician.

He was the son of civil engineer John Busby and his wife Sarah, and migrated to New South Wales in 1824. He worked for his father building Sydney's water supply tunnel, and from 1834 worked as an overseer.

He purchased land near Cassilis in partnership with his brother Alexander in 1837. On 20 December 1856 he married Catherine Ann Woore, with whom he had twelve children.

In 1867 he was appointed to the New South Wales Legislative Council. He died at Double Bay at his property Redleaf in 1887, leaving an estate worth over £106,000.
