= William Walker (New South Wales colonial politician) =

Australian politician

William Benjamin Walker (1820 – 9 January 1889) was a politician, merchant, pastoralist and yachtsman from New South Wales, Australia.

Walker was the second son of William Walker, a prominent merchant in early colonial Australia.

Walker was originally a pastoralist, operating a series of stations in the Bega region, based out of the Kamarooka Estate. He was later a merchant in Sydney, operating the firm of William Walker & Co. The firms activities included ship-owning and whaling. Thirteen of their vessels made 58 whaling voyages between 1824 and 1851.

He built and lived in the Redleaf mansion at Double Bay, which he named after his parents' house in England. The property survives, and now serves as the council chambers for the Municipality of Woollahra. He served in the New South Wales Legislative Council from 1863 until his resignation in 1867. He was involved in the establishment of the Royal Sydney Yacht Squadron in 1863, and served as its Commodore until resigning in 1867; he was reportedly departing permanently for England. In 1870, he was reported to have been cruising the Mediterranean and to be preparing for the racing season in England. He had also been president of the Anniversary Regatta Committee.

He was married to Corentia (née Browne), sister of Rolf Boldrewood. Their second son, Cecil, died in the shipwreck of the Avalanche off Portland in 1877.

Walker died in 1889 (aged 68–69) .
