= Tank Stream =

Heritage-listed stream in Sydney, Australia

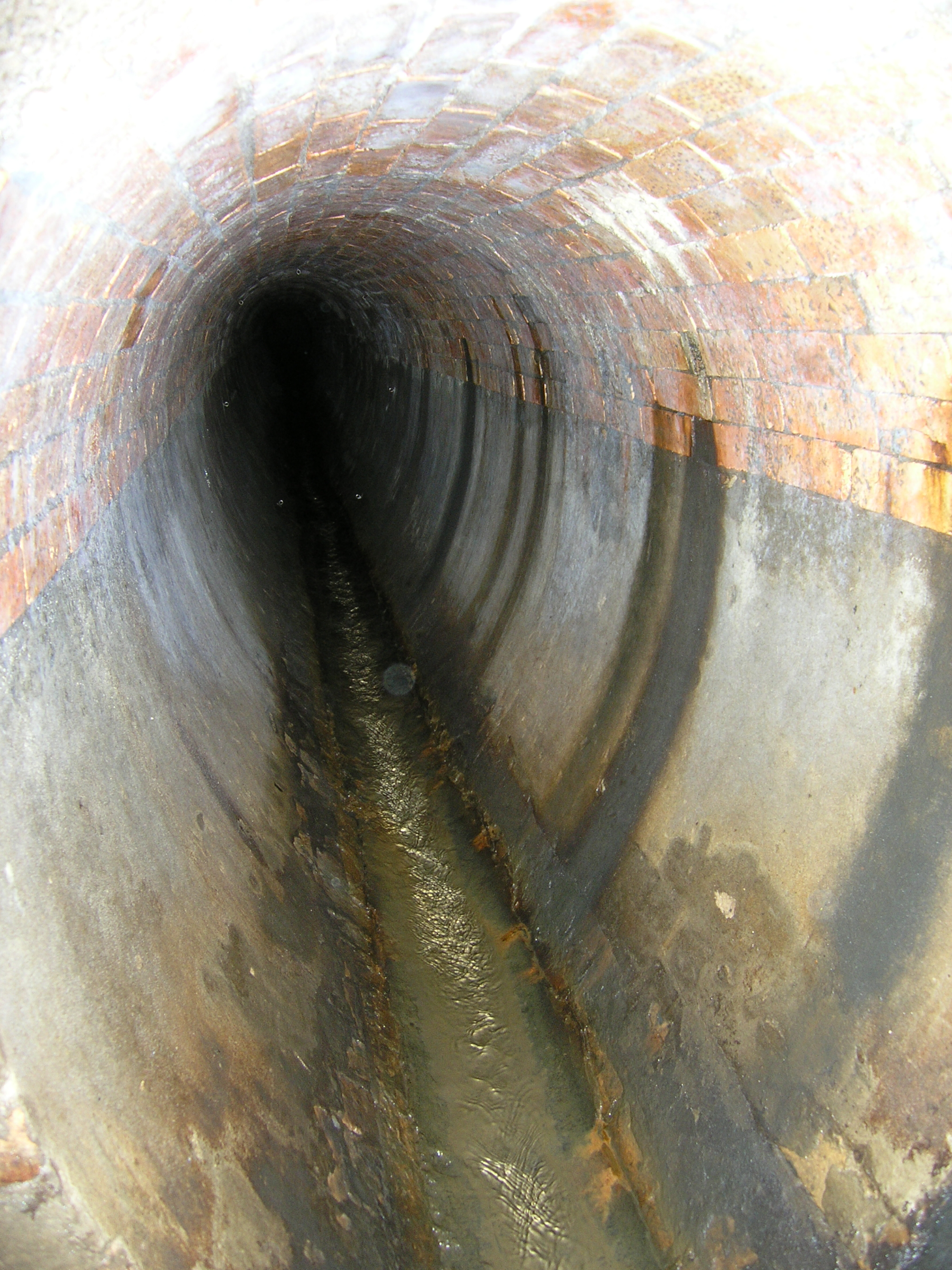
- Brick-lined section of the Tank Stream, pictured in November 2008
- Location in Sydney central business district

Location
- Country: Australia
- State: New South Wales
- Local government area: City of Sydney

Physical characteristics
- Source: Hyde Park
  - location: Sydney CBD
  - coordinates: 33°52′13.2″S 151°12′27.9″E
- Mouth: Sydney Cove
  - location: Circular Quay
  - coordinates: 33°51′50.0472″S 151°12′31.1688″E

Basin features
- River system: Port Jackson

New South Wales Heritage Register
- Official name: Tank Stream; Tank Stream Fountain Circular Quay
- Type: State heritage (built)
- Designated: 2 April 1999
- Reference no.: 636
- Type: Spring
- Category: Utilities - Water
- Builders: Various

The Tank Stream is a heritage-listed former fresh water tributary of Sydney Cove and now tunnel and watercourse located in the Sydney central business district, in the City of Sydney local government area of New South Wales, Australia. The Tank Stream was the fresh water supply for the fledgling colony of New South Wales in the late 18th century. Today it is little more than a storm water drain. It originated from a swamp to the west of present-day Hyde Park and at high tide entered Sydney Cove at what is now the intersection of Bridge and Pitt Streets in the Sydney central business district. The catchment was 65 hectares (161 acres), corresponding roughly the size of the Sydney central business district. It was added to the New South Wales State Heritage Register on 2 April 1999.

== History ==
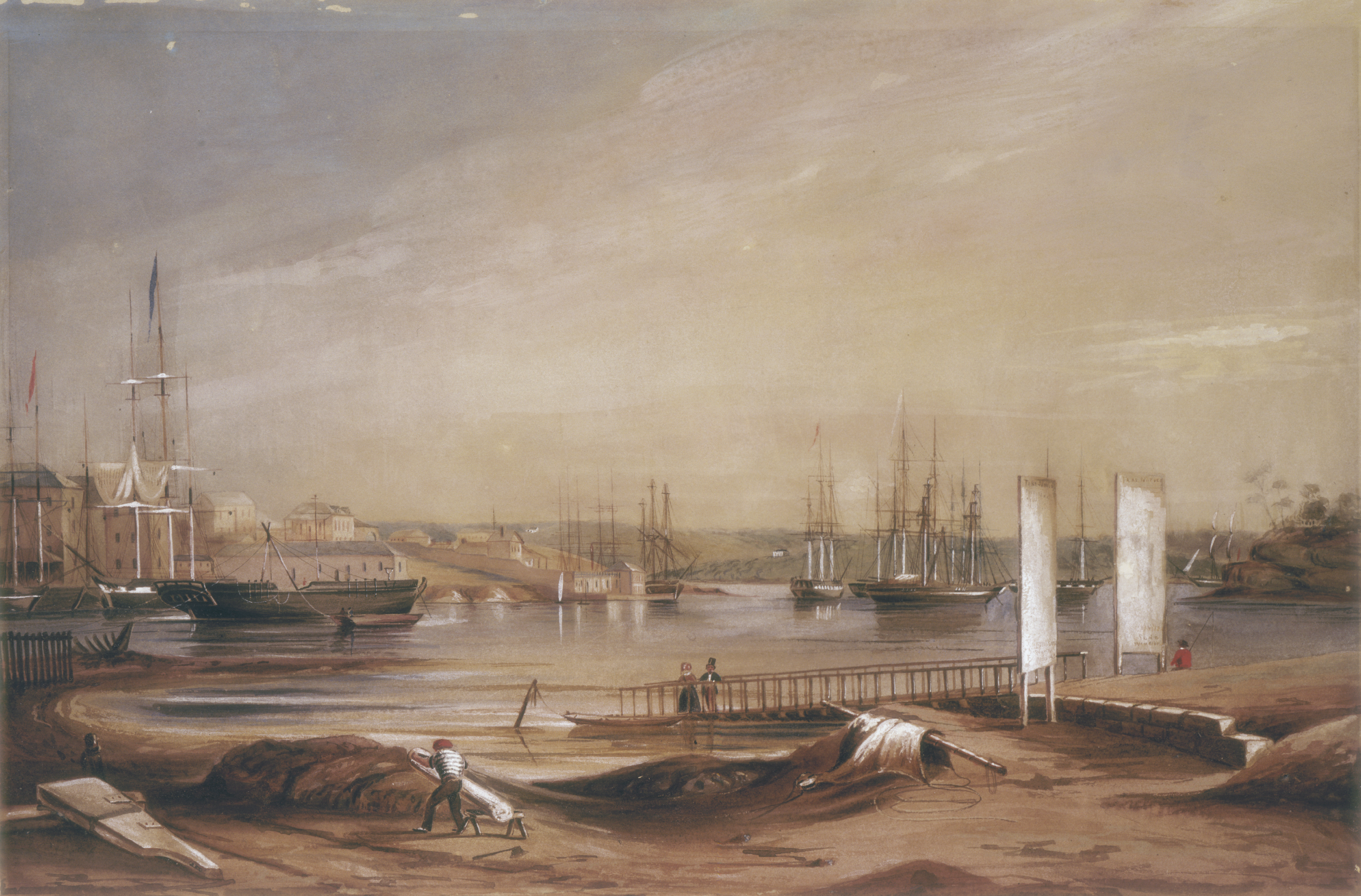
Circular Quay and mouth of the Tank Stream, Sydney Cove, Frederick Garling Jr., 1839

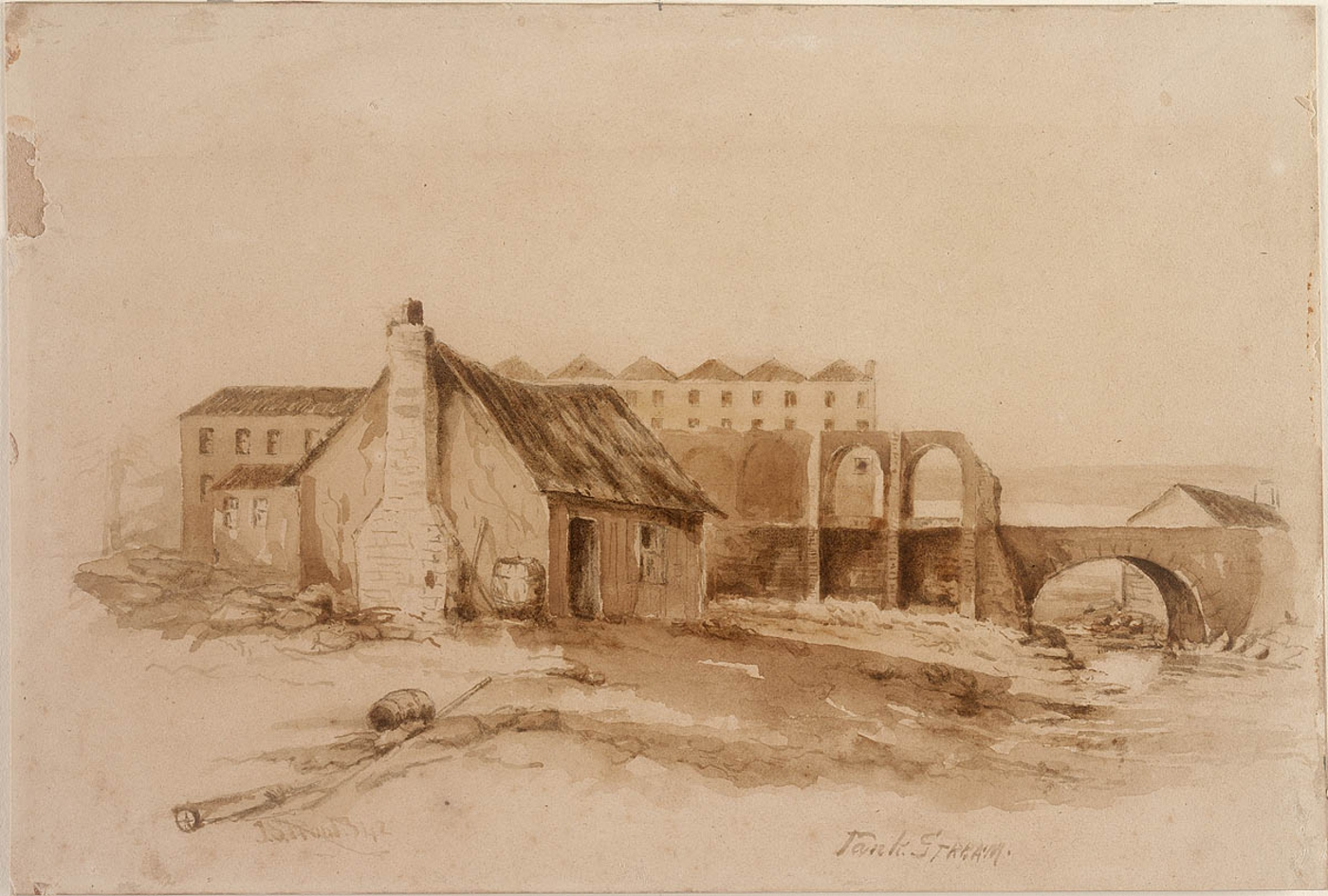
Tank Stream, Sydney, 1842, John Skinner Prout

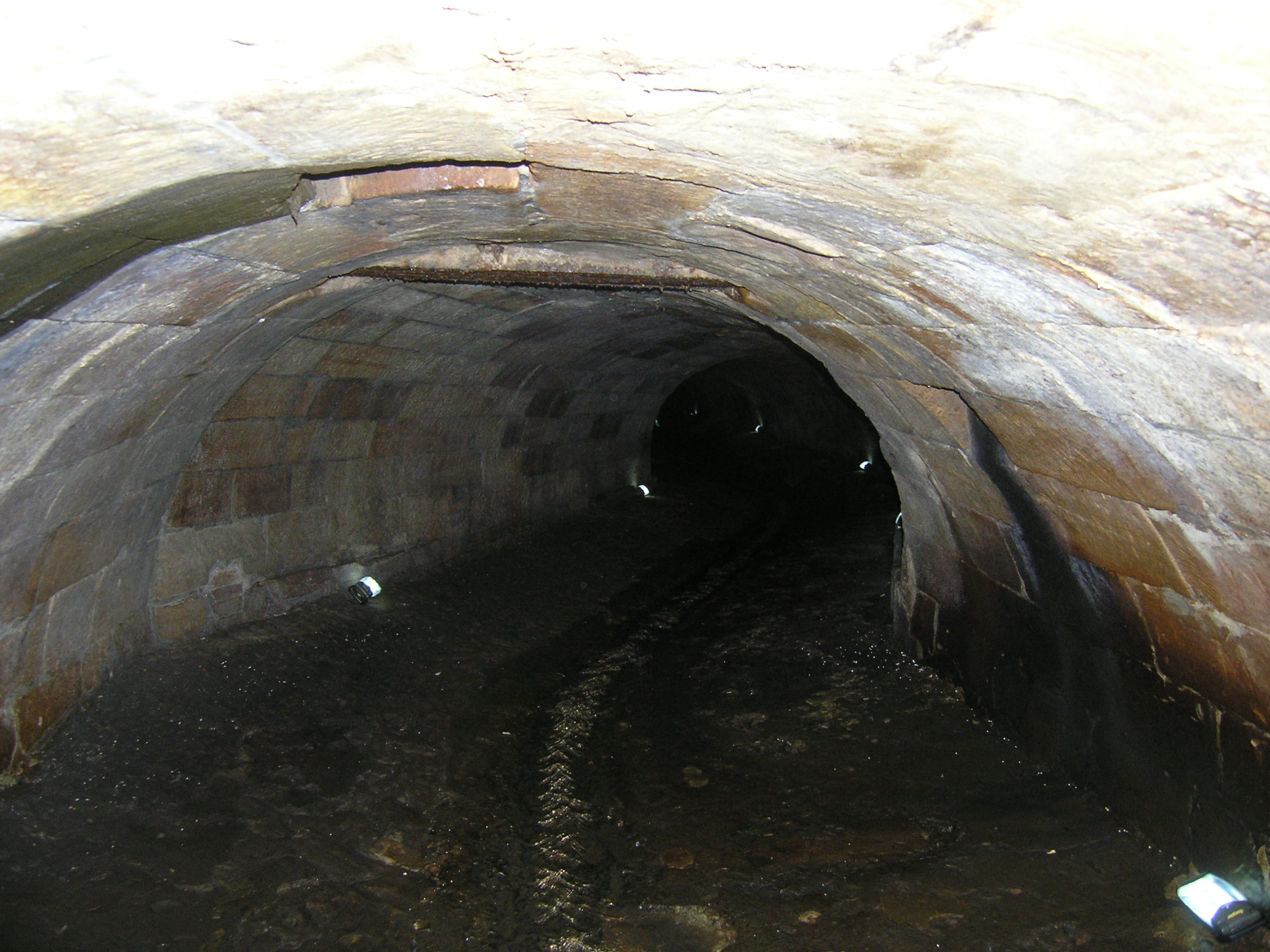
Tank Stream on a November 2008 tour

The history of the Tank Stream incorporates Aboriginal use of the land; the history of European settlement; the natural forming stream as a water supply; and its later use for waste disposal and as a part of the stormwater system. The Gadigal (or Cadigal) people were the Aboriginal group most commonly accepted to have lived around the Sydney Cove area prior to European arrival. The catchment area around Tank Stream provided "a range of environments — marine, estuarine, rock platform, creek, open forest, wetland" all located within a short distance and able to provide a range of food and material. Excavations around Tank Stream have uncovered Aboriginal flake stone artifacts made from water-worn pebbles. The stream is thought to have given the Aboriginal people fresh water, fish and other resources.

Although it was unable to consistently provide water in dry weather, the stream also played a role in dividing the settlement, with the eastern side being held for government and administrative functions and convicts living on the western side. The area was chosen by the commander of the First Fleet, Captain Arthur Phillip, R.N., in 1788 as the location for the New South Wales colony for similar reasons. The colony had originally been planned for Botany Bay, on the recommendation of Sir Joseph Banks who had visited the area with Captain James Cook 17 years earlier, but when no fresh water was found there, Phillip sought a better site, and found it in the previously unvisited Port Jackson. Sydney Cove was chosen for settlement as it "was at the head of the cove, near the run of fresh water which stole silently along through a very thick wood". On 26 January 1788 the new colony was inaugurated. In 1790 Tanks were cut into the bedrock of the stream (hence the name), the number of tanks is believed to be three or four, and are thought to have held 20,000 litres and been 5m deep.

As early as 1791 Governor Phillip enclosed Tank Stream with a fence in an attempt to prevent stock muddying the water; and later, trenches were cut alongside the stream in an attempt to catch runoff before it could enter the stream. Yet due to the increasing population; number of buildings around the stream and the loss of trees as land was cleared, runoff increased, which included human and animal wastes and domestic products. In 1795 orders were made to prevent the grazing of stock or cutting of trees within a 15m distance of the stream. These measures were ultimately unsuccessful. In 1792 a stone arch bridge over Tank Stream was constructed, replacing existing wooden structures. Its foundations may survive within the streambed under modern Bridge Street.

The Tank Stream rose in marshy ground roughly bounded by what is now Elizabeth, Market, Pitt and Park Streets. It filtered through the soil between Pitt and George Streets before forming a definite channel near King Street and flowing to Sydney Cove. Tank Stream was the main source of fresh water until the completion of Busby's Bore in 1837. Other dams were later added within the catchment area of Lachlan Swamps; now located within Centennial Park. Yet by 1826 Tank Stream had become an unofficial sewer, it became an official sewer in 1857. This (and other) sewers discharged directly into the harbour; a situation that created discontent as social attitudes changed. The form of the open channels was generally a convict period shallow V profile which assisted in improving the flow of the stream; in the late 1850s work commenced in covering the Bridge Street- Hunter Street section of Tank Stream. This was necessary to reduce smells. The form of the channel was a mixture of stone and brick in the lower half, with a sandstone arch roof. Later sections were also roofed, generally with an arch to oviform. Prior to 1888 Tank Stream also carried salt water, stored in council reservoirs for the purpose of street cleaning and dust suppression. Salt water was used to minimise the use of fresh water supplies.

During a drought in 1790 three storage tanks were constructed in the sandstone beside the Tank Stream and it is from these that the stream gets its name. One of these was at the present intersection of Pitt and Spring Streets and the other two in Bond Street on the opposite side of the stream. The Tank Stream could not meet the needs of the growing colony and, despite efforts by successive Governors, it became increasingly polluted by runoff from the settlement. It was finally abandoned in 1826, though it had been little more than an open sewer for the preceding decade. Sydney's next supply of water was Busby's Bore, in 1830.

In 1850 the swamp feeding the Tank Stream was drained. Starting in 1860, the Tank Stream was progressively covered and is now a storm water channel which is controlled by Sydney Water. In 2007 there were calls from some to see it run above ground again to create a central feature in the city.

Over the past century, Tank Stream has remained a part of the stormwater channel within the Sydney system. Changes to the channel have been largely restricted to replacing sections with modern pipe. This has destroyed a number of sections of the channel and is largely tied to post-World War II redevelopment where little regard was paid to the historic value of the Tank Stream. Redevelopment of the GPO site allowed further investigation of Tank Stream and has provided information on the building development of Tank Stream over time. Brick drains, possibly dated pre 1820, were found. A further search revealed soil from the original Tank Stream bed.

== Description ==
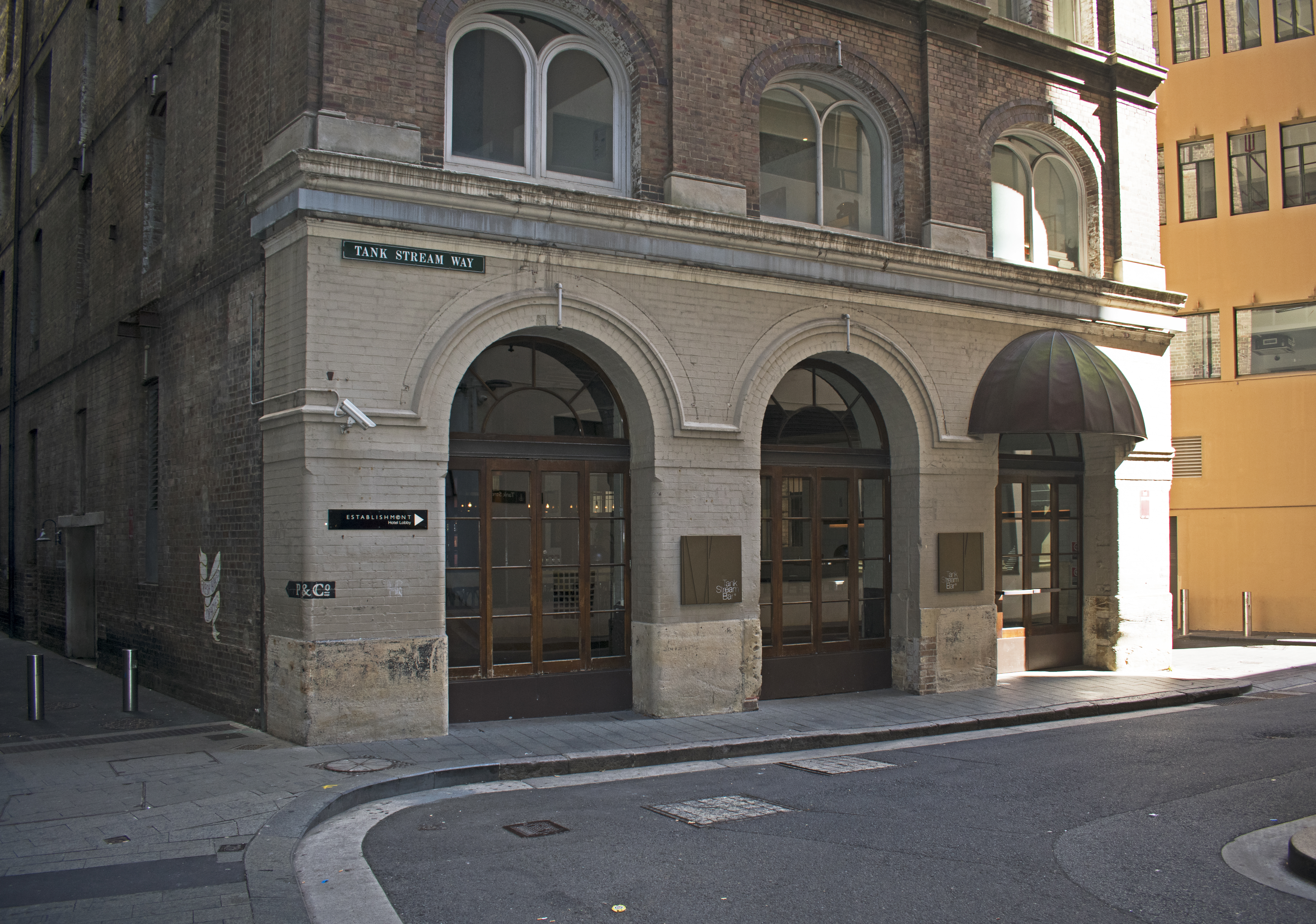
Tank Stream Way 1 seen from the southeast

The surviving fabric of the Tank Stream is extant from King Street in the south at a point between Pitt and George Streets to Circular Quay in the north.

The Stream has been blocked at a point just south of King Street and for 13 metres north of this point represents the 1866 open sewer, which was covered in 1876. The dimensions are 810mm broad by 1220mm high. Between King Street and Martin Place (163 metres) there are three phases of construction, beginning with a modern concrete pipe (750mm diameter), the section approaching the GPO is part of the historic oviform sewer (810 by 1220mm) and lastly a stainless steel box-profile pipe (1070 by 750mm). The section between Martin and Angel Places returns to the 1866 brick open drains enclosed in 1876. This form continues between Angel Place and Hunter Street for 95 metres before being interrupted by a 36-metre section of modern cement lined pipe laid in 1962 and a steel section laid in 1958 and 1978 (both are 1350mm).

From Hunter to Bond Street the Stream is a semi-circular stone arch with a shallow V-shaped floor for 35 metres (1500 by 3000mm). The 1790 cut tanks were originally located in this area, but are not thought to have survived. For the following 86 metres, below Australia Square, the original sewer has been replaced with concrete box-profile pipe (1220 by 1830mm), inserted during the construction of the Square in 1962. The Australia Square Tower basement houses the access to Tank Stream for public tours and as an inspection point for Sydney Water.

The boxed concrete section (1220 by 1830mm) continues from Bond Street to Abercrombie Lane, a distance of 60 metres. Tank Stream between Abercrombie Lane and Bridge Street, a length of 40 metres, is of c.1860 semi-circular stone arch (1500 by 3000mm). On the ground here, Tank Stream Way preserves the name of the stream. From Bridge Street Tank Stream diverts to run under Pitt Street to Circular Quay, a length of 185 metres. Beginning with a stone oviform sewer of 810mm by 1220mm, constructed in c.1878, the shape changes to a semi-elliptic stone arch of 3000mm and varying between 1100 and 1400mm.

=== Modifications and dates ===
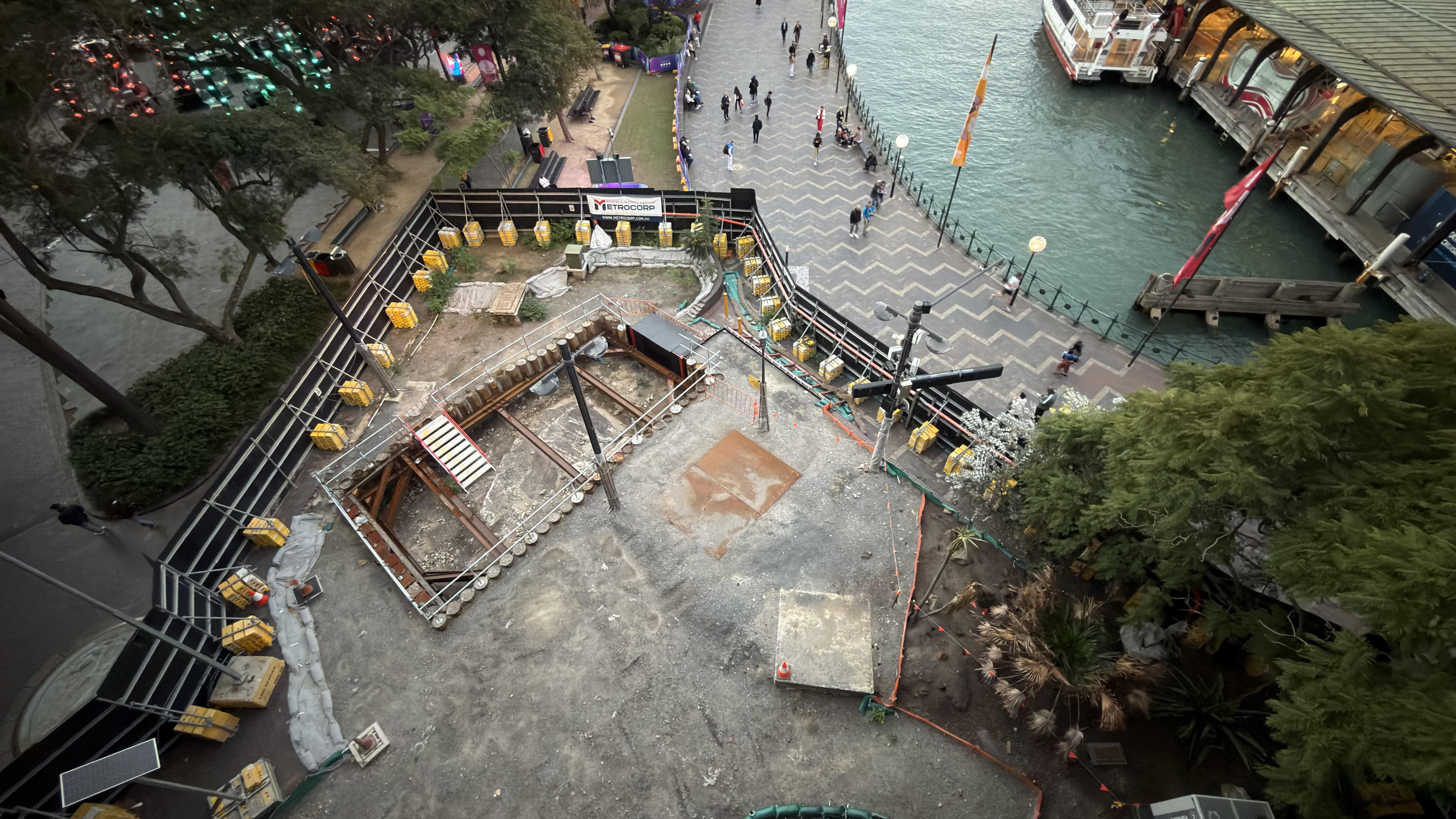
The present-day terminus of the Tank Stream at Circular Quay. Between 2024 and 2027, a small portion of the culvert is visible due to a restoration project by Sydney Water

Major modification include the following:

- 1788-1826: Clearing of vegetation within the vicinity of stream, construction of dwellings, grazing and watering of animals.
- 1790: Cutting of tanks for water storage
- 1790: Chiselling of stone and inset of additional slabs into base of stream to improve flow in a shallow V profile.
- 1791: Enclosure within a fence against livestock and trespass.
- 1792: First bridge crossing.
- 1810: Cut-off drains alongside of Tank Stream channel to reduce inflow of polluted stormwater
- 1826: Tank Stream disallowed for drinking by Governor Brisbane. Governor Darling arranged for seven wells to be dug in the city. Governor Darling employed people to repair existing sewers.
- 1832: Construction of sewers seriously discussed.
- 1833: Water from partly built Busby's Bore used to pipe water to ships.
- 1842: City Council incorporated.
- c.1850: Semi Circular Quay was formed which necessitated the extension of the Tank Stream for the area north of Bridge St.
- 1855: Brickworks at Newtown was purchased, along with vitreous clay pipes and Roman Cement.
- 1857: Work completed on first part of the Bennelong Sewer to discharge sewage as far out as possible into the harbour. This would service the more elevated areas, whereas the Tank Stream in Hunter St and King St as a bolted cast iron oviform aqueduct. This sewer (and possibly stormwater) network had the effect of draining the swamp area that had previously supplied some water to the Tank Stream, making the Tank stream more polluted by being less "cleansed".
- The section of the Tank Stream from the Sydney Cove to the Interception Chamber in Pitt St was completed, approx. 200m. The section at the mouth (approx. 5m has been strengthened with concrete in the two filleted corners. The next 10 m is sandstone arch. The next 15m section has the original stone floor overlaid with concrete, date unknown. The remaining section up to the Interception Champer (approx. 170m) is sandstone arch.
- 1858: Independent outfalls also completed at Woolloomooloo, Hay Street and Black Wattle Bay. Over the next 20 years, approx 10 other minor outlets were also opened.
- 1860: The sandstone arch between Bridge St and Hunter St was constructed. This was done to reduce odours from the previously open sewer/stormwater that up until that time had been more of a slops line.
- 1866: Section from south of Hunter St to Martin Place was formed as an open stone channel. In late 1870s was converted by roofing with an arch to oviform, whereas more southerly section was oviform invert with a flat roof, where it passes under Challis House... (Other parts were replaced in 2001 as part of the Angel Place project).
- Two sections were laid as oviform through the future GPO.
- To the south, two sections were laid as brick oviform and with some amendments in 1878.
- 1878: The brick oviform section from the Interception Chamber to Bridge St was constructed by contract for the City council. This was built to replace the open section that ran through private property. At the southern end there is a transition section (reducer), which leads to the sandstone arch, which is in Tank Stream Way (formerly Hamilton St.).
- 1879: The section from Bridge St to Hunter St, with its sandstone arch roof in place has its floor slabs lifted and re-instated with mortar foundations to water proof the floor for its use as a sewer. In addition a terra cotta "scouring channel" was cut into the centre of the floor
- The section immediately upstream of Hunter St was built as oviform. This included a terra cotta flow channel.
- The next section upstream was also constructed. It was a bottom only oviform, and part of it was built underneath an existing stone arch bridge.
- 1880: Brick oviform was constructed for the full width of King St and terminating.
- 1898: SPS [Sewerage Pumping Station] 16 constructed. the section immediately downstream of the interception chamber, has an interception pipe leading to SPS 16 form the tidal weir.
- 1940: Section just upstream of Martin Place was replaced with concrete pipe under the GPO in 1940. This replaced 1866 brick oviform.
- 1951: Stormwater drainages charges were introduced for parts of the City of Sydney from 16 November 1951.
- 1958: Replacement, at the rear of 105-107 Pitt St.
- 1962: Replacement, at rear of Commercial Union House [south end of Pitt St.]
- 1965: Replacement within Australia Square. Construction of Tank Stream visitor access space.
- 1975: Replacement within basement of New Zealand Insurance Building [North of Bond St.]
- 2001: Replacement in Former GPO site.
- 2002: Replacement within Angel Place project.
- 2024-2027: Major renewal works by Sydney Water around First Fleet Park

== Tourism ==
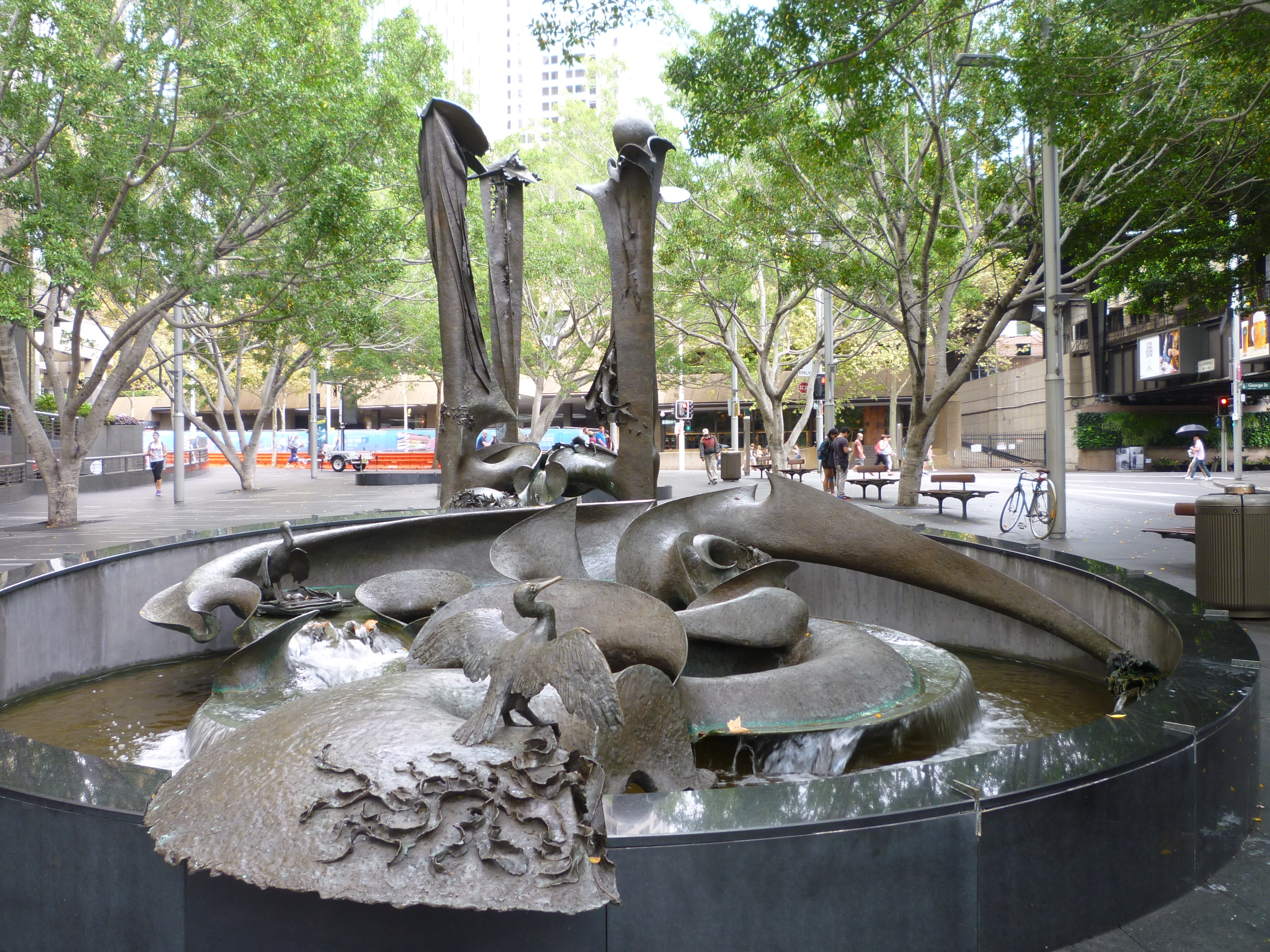
Tank Stream Fountain, 2016

Tank Stream tours are run by the Sydney Living Museums and Sydney Water. These are usually in April and November. The tickets are limited and allocated by ballot. There is an information centre behind locked gates at the beginning of the tour. One can also trace the previous stream course following art work, street names, and pub names.

The Tank Stream has been commemorated in a sculpture by Stephen Walker, created in 1981. The sculpture, known as the Tank Stream Fountain, is located at Circular Quay.

== Heritage listing ==
As at 31 May 2006, The Tank Stream is significant because it was the reason the First Fleet settlement was established in Sydney Cove, and therefore influenced the future shape of Sydney over two centuries. It is linked in the public mind with the period of first European settlement and retains value as an iconic representation of that period and is interpreted as a metaphor of the period of contact and early urban settlement in Australia.

The Tank Stream itself has retained an identity through the functional changes from being a fresh water supply, through subsequent use as combined sewer and stormwater drain to its current function as a stormwater drain. It is an important survivor of the first period of organised and integrated water management in an Australian city. The stone-cut water tanks, which may survive archaeologically, are important symbols of the reliance upon water in the colony, both in absolute terms and as an indication of the fragility of the European presence in Australia.

The surviving fabric documents mid-nineteenth century sanitation design and construction, and subsequent changes in methods and also the theory of urban wastewater management. This evidence is preserved in the drain enclosing the Tank Stream, in physical evidence of change, and may also be present archaeologically in buried parts of the Tank Stream line. The archaeological evidence of the Tank Stream has the potential to contain deposits that can contain information about pre-human and pre-urban environments in Sydney, Aboriginal occupation and early non-indigenous occupation of Sydney. The fabric enclosing the watercourse demonstrates one of the most comprehensive collections of hydrological technology in Australia.

The sections of the former Tank Stream south of King Street which survive have potential for retaining evidence of the earliest periods of its human use, although this is likely to have been severely compromised by development. The swampy source of the stream may provide evidence of past environmental conditions.

Tank Stream was listed on the New South Wales State Heritage Register on 2 April 1999 having satisfied the following criteria.

The place is important in demonstrating the course, or pattern, of cultural or natural history in New South Wales.

The Tank Stream is significant because it was the reason the First Fleet settlement was established in Sydney Cove, and therefore influenced the future shape of Sydney over two centuries. It is linked in the public mind with the period of first European settlement and retains value as an iconic representation of that period and is interpreted as a metaphor of the period of contact and early urban settlement in Australia.

The Tank Stream itself has retained an identity through the functional changes from being a fresh water supply, through subsequent use as combined sewer and stormwater drain to its current function as a stormwater drain. It is an important survivor of the first period of organised and integrated water management in an Australian city. The stone-cut water tanks, which may survive archaeologically, are important symbols of the reliance upon water in the colony, both in absolute terms and as an indication of the fragility of the European presence in Australia.

The place has a strong or special association with a person, or group of persons, of importance of cultural or natural history of New South Wales's history.

The original watercourse and catchment would have provided a resource for exploitation by the Gadigal people who occupied the southern shore of Sydney Harbour at contact and their ancestors. As a result of the severity of this displacement the Tank Stream has become symbolic of the European settlers immediate appropriation of essential resources and Aboriginal dispossession.

The Tank Stream influenced, and has been influenced by, Governor Phillip and subsequent early governors of the Australian colony. The course of the stream determined Phillip's siting of the first camp and this early administrative decision influenced the subsequent urban form of Sydney.

The place is important in demonstrating aesthetic characteristics and/or a high degree of creative or technical achievement in New South Wales.

The Tank Stream features fine quality stonemasonry and brickwork from the nineteenth century, houman scale and an intriguing form showing layers of different phases of construction. This includes modifications introduced to improve the operation, e.g. terracotta drains.

The place has a strong or special association with a particular community or cultural group in New South Wales for social, cultural or spiritual reasons.

The Tank Stream is of State significance for its recognition in the community with the placement of Sydney in its current location, as evidenced by the popularity of tours. Community value of the Stream has increased with the growth of heritage consciousness since the 1970s.

The place has potential to yield information that will contribute to an understanding of the cultural or natural history of New South Wales.

The sections of the former Tank Stream south of King Street which survive have potential for retaining evidence of the earliest periods of its human use. This includes early construction, brickmaking and waterproofing techniques. The swampy source of the stream may provide evidence of past environmental conditions and potentially of Aboriginal occupation prior to European arrival.

The place possesses uncommon, rare or endangered aspects of the cultural or natural history of New South Wales.

Tank Stream is of State significance as the only water source available to the First Fleet arrival in their settlement of Sydney. Tank Stream is the only surviving evidence of this early period of water resource development.

The fabric of the Tank Stream and its enclosing stormwater drain contains rare surviving evidence of the eighteenth and nineteenth century water supply and sewerage construction in the one linear site.

The place is important in demonstrating the principal characteristics of a class of cultural or natural places/environments in New South Wales.

The Tank Stream is representative of a significant collection of water and wastewater heritage assets from the mid-nineteenth century onwards. Operationally, the Tank Stream competently serves as a stormwater drain. From the historical and social perspective, the Tank Stream serves to represent the system and Sydney Water as a whole as the most historic and valued heritage item.

The fabric of the Tank Stream and of the enclosing stormwater drain is representative of a range of technologies associated with water reticulation, sewerage and drainage for a period of two centuries.

== See also ==
- Waihorotiu Stream, Auckland
- List of public art in the City of Sydney
- Waste management in Australia
