= Thomas Woore =

First surveyor of an Australian railway

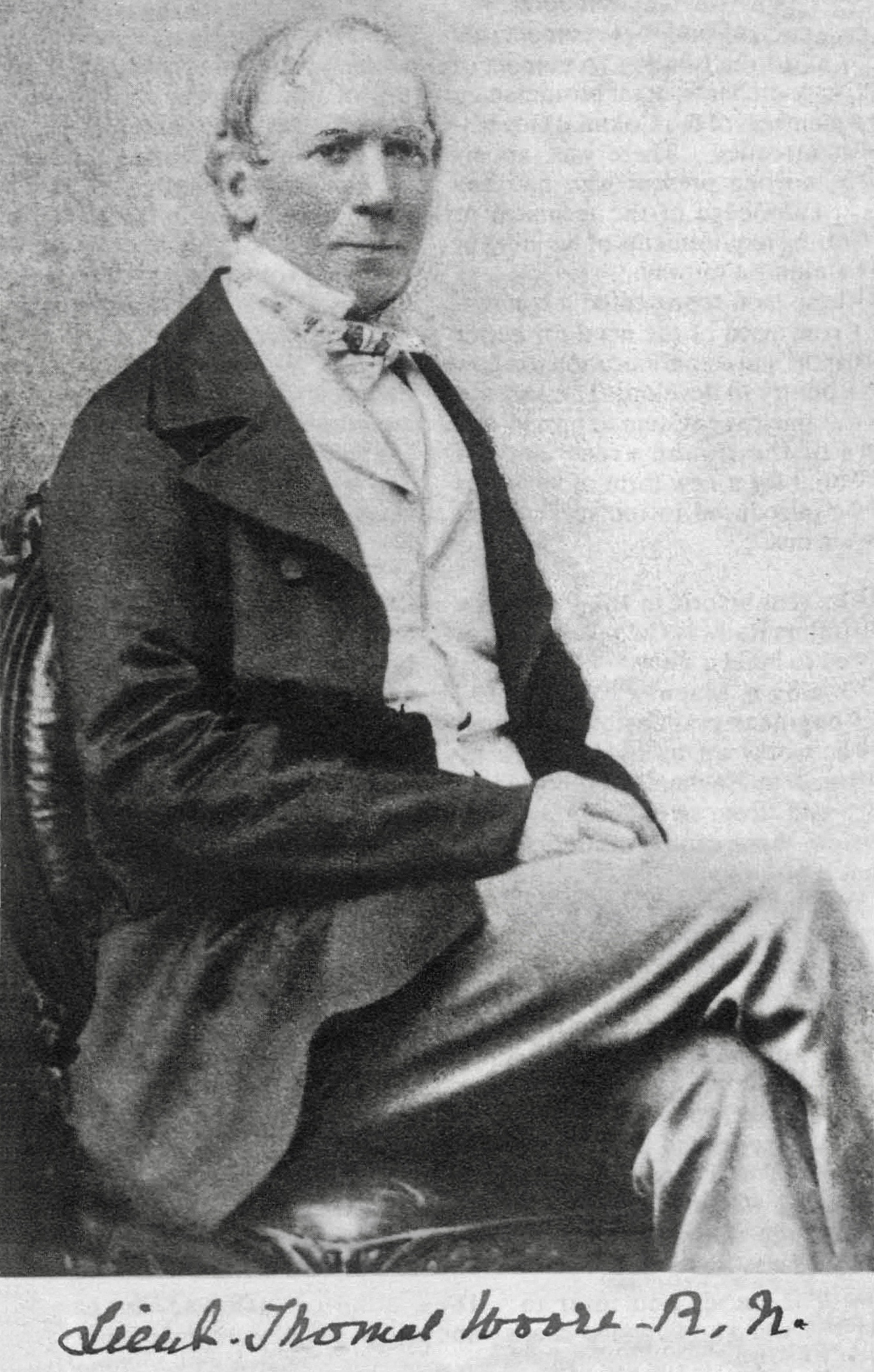
- Born: 29 January 1804; Ireland
- Died: 21 June 1878 (aged 74); Australia
- Spouse: Mary A. Dickson (1835)
- Relatives: William Busby (son-in-law)

Thomas Woore (29 January 1804 – 21 June 1878) was a Royal Navy officer, grazier, railways leader and surveyor. Woore was born in Derry, County Londonderry, Ireland and died in Double Bay, Sydney, Australia.

Moore joined the Royal Navy as a 15-year-old in 1819, and served on various ships, including HMS Alligator, before retiring in 1834. On 1 January 1835, he married Mary Dickson, daughter of John Dickson. From 1846 until 1848 he worked, on his own volition, surveying possible routes for the proposed railway line being put forward by the predecessor of the Sydney Railway Company. In 1867 he was commissioned, with others, to search for a solution to the water shortage of Sydney.
