= Busby's Bore =

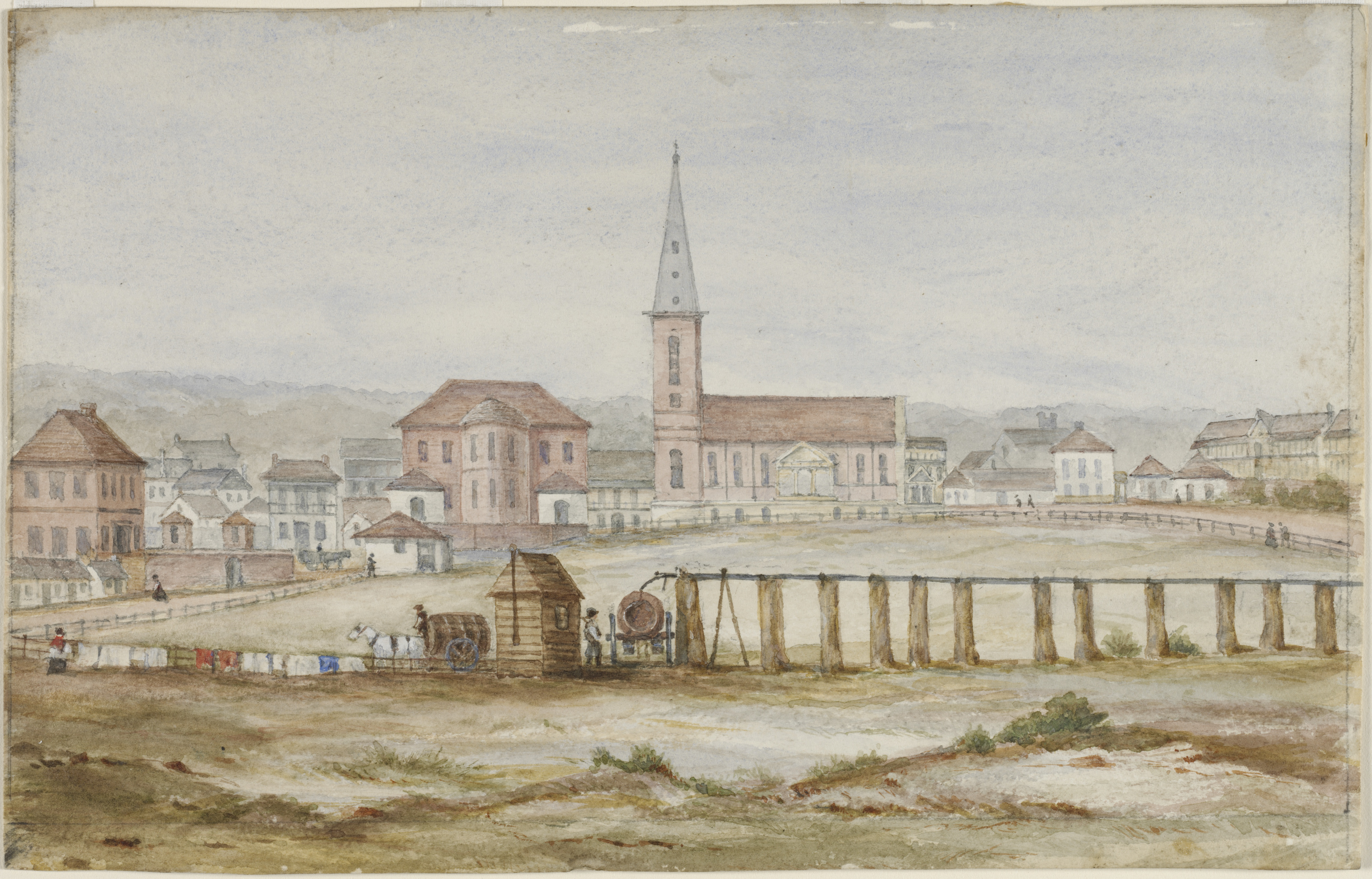
- An 1857 sketch of the stand pipe in Hyde Park
- Interactive map of Busby's Bore

Overview
- Location: Centennial Park to College Street via Surry Hills, Sydney, New South Wales, Australia
- Coordinates: 33°53′52″S 151°13′42″E
- Start: Lang Park
- End: Hyde Park

Operation
- Work began: September 1827
- Opened: June 1837
- Owner: Sydney Water

Technical
- Design engineer: John Busby
- Length: 3.6 kilometres (2 1/4 mi)

New South Wales Heritage Register
- Official name: Busby's Bore; Busbys Bore
- Type: State heritage (built)
- Designated: 2 April 1999
- Reference no.: 568
- Type: Bore
- Category: Utilities – Water
- Builders: Convict labour

Busby's Bore, Sydney's second water supply, is a heritage-listed former water management facility located between Centennial Park and College Street, Surry Hills, Sydney, New South Wales, Australia. It was designed by John Busby and built from 1827 to 1837 by convict labour. It is also known as Busbys Bore. The property is owned by Sydney Water. It was added to the New South Wales State Heritage Register on 2 April 1999, and on local government heritage registers.

== History ==
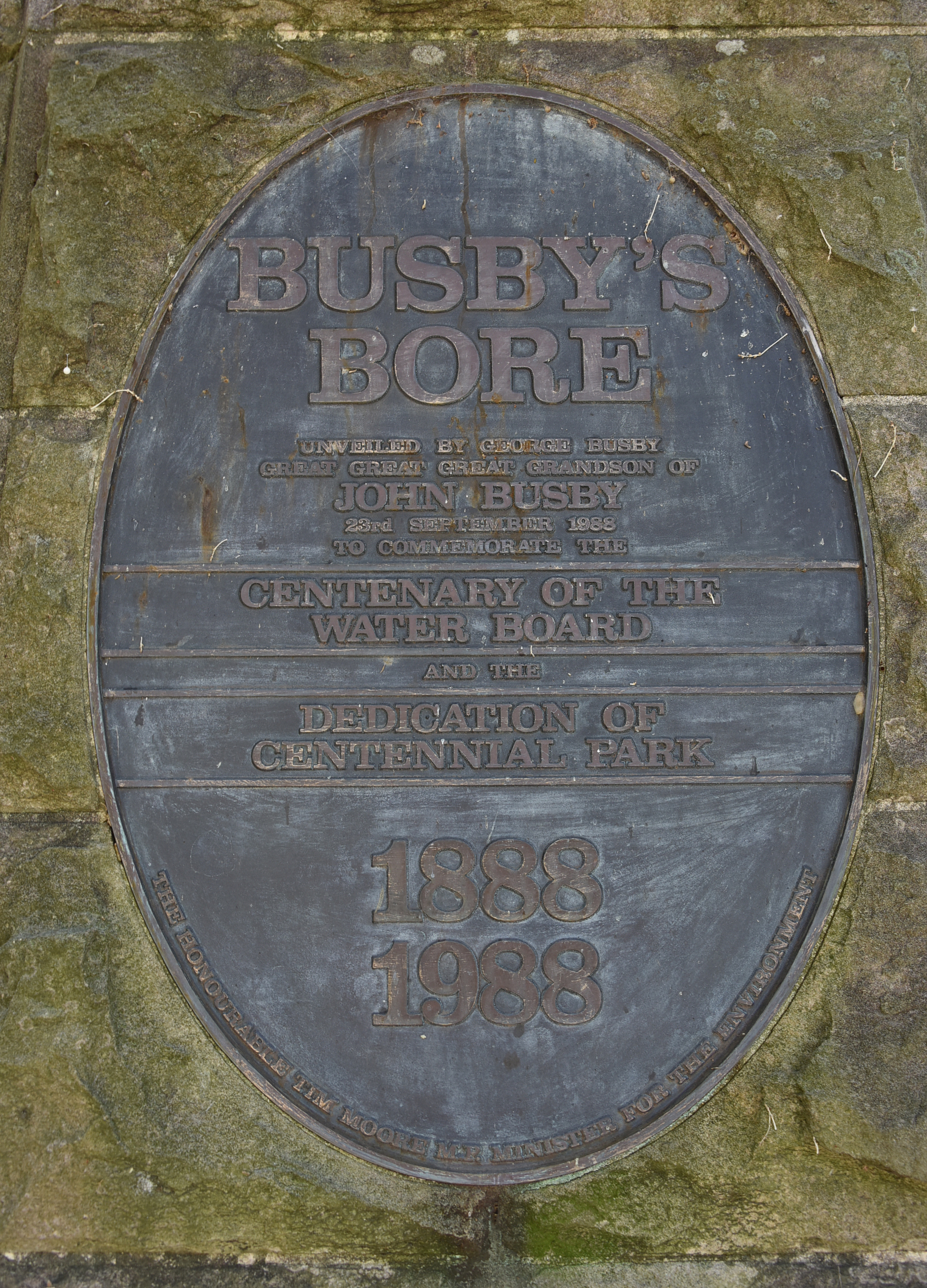
A memorial of Busby's Bore located in Centennial Park, erected in 1988, pictured in 2017.

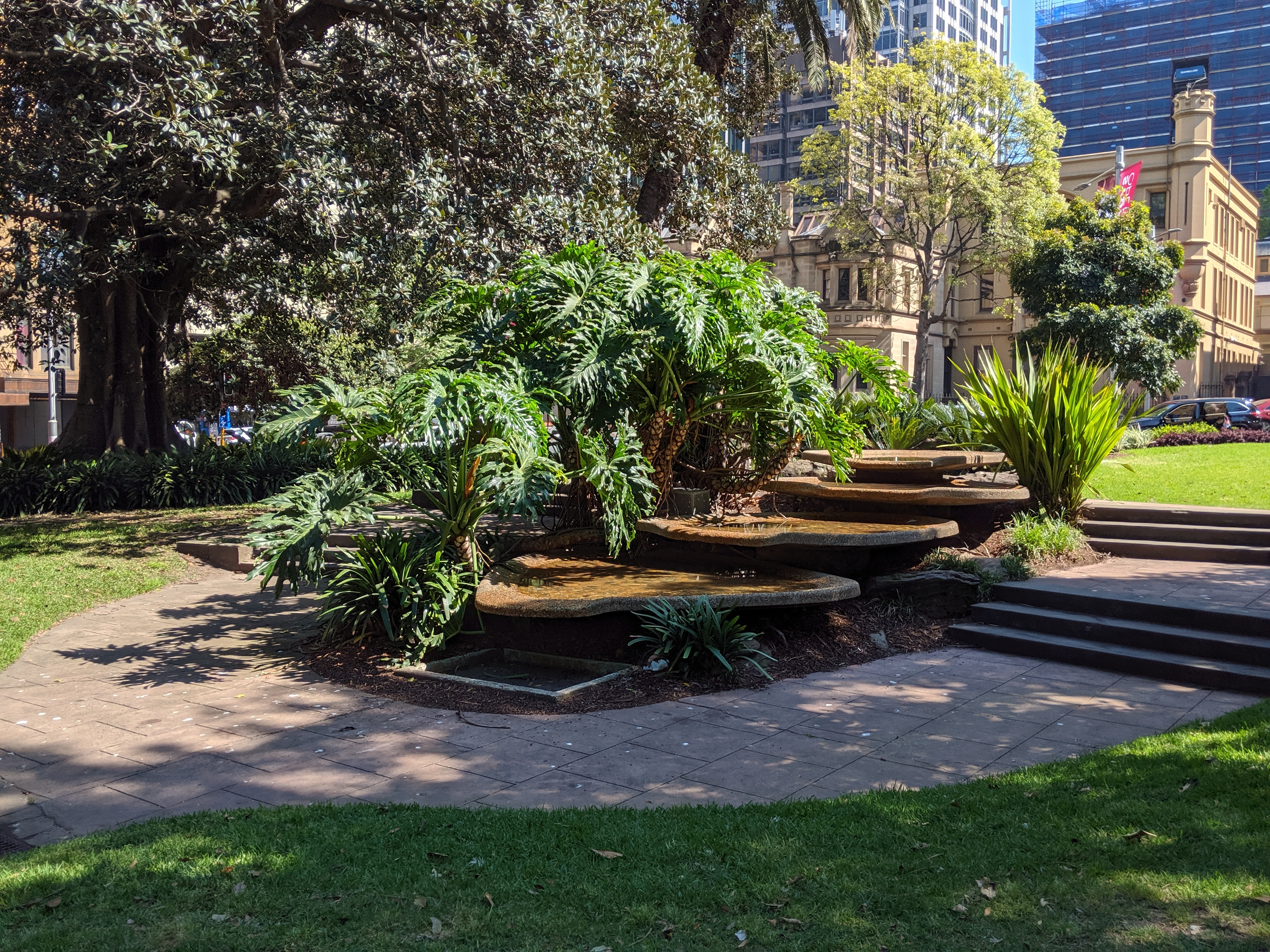
Fountain in Hyde Park, commemorating Sydney's second source of water and its first piped water supply, pictured in 2019.

By the 1820s, the Tank Stream, Sydney's original water supply, had become little more than an open sewer, and the growing colony had become reliant on wells or water carted from the Lachlan Swamps. In 1826, Busby recommended that water from the Lachlan Swamps be delivered to a reservoir at the Racecourse (now Hyde Park) via a tunnel (or 'bore'). The reservoir was not approved but construction of the tunnel began in September 1827. The Bore was not completed until 1837 but began supplying drinkable water in 1830.

The construction of Busby's Bore, a water supply tunnel extending from Centennial Park to Hyde Park, began in September 1827 and was completed 10 years later. The bore was designed to carry water from the Lachlan Swamp, now Centennial and Queen's Parks. It would supply the "rising capital of Australia", as Sydney was described in the Report of a Committee of the Legislative Council appointed to enquire into the state of the tunnel and outstanding wage claims in 1837.

The water was gravity fed, the fall being 53 centimetres (1 ft 9 in) over the 3.6 kilometres (2 1/4 mi) from end to end, to feed out at Hyde Park at a height sufficient to allow the supply of the General Hospital in Macquarie Street. The tunnel had to be re-routed around the sites of the Sydney Football Stadium and the Sydney Cricket Ground and through the Showground because of quicksand encountered in Moore Park. The Bore commenced at what is now Busby's Pond, close to the present Lang Road entrance to Centennial Park and ended in the present Hyde Park near the Oxford Street entrance. From there, a line of pipe supported on trestles extended to a point near the corner of Park and Elizabeth Streets.

John Busby had been employed as a mineral and water surveyor in England, Ireland and Scotland. He applied to the English Colonial Office for employment in NSW. Lord Bathurst, then Secretary of State, appointed him as Mineral Surveyor and Civil Engineer with particular attention to "the management of coal mines [and] in supplying the Town of Sydney with water". Busby arrived in Sydney in 1824 aged 59. He was employed as engineer at the Newcastle Coal Mines and on the breakwater then under construction there. However, his major task was to undertake surveys with a view to obtaining a permanent and adequate water supply for Sydney.

During Busby's time at Newcastle, the Sydney domestic water still came from the virtually defunct and certainly highly polluted Tank Stream and a spring at Ultimo and another near Oxford Street. These were supplemented by wells both public and private. Many of these, especially those in the north of the town, were contaminated.

At the start of construction Busby engaged his son, Alexander, as his assistant, but the appointment was disallowed in London. William Busby then acted as assistant at his fathers expense. There were three free overseers but these were for the first year only. Apart from these, the whole of the work was performed by convicts. Between 50 and 140 were employed working 24 hours a day in three eight-hour shifts, a common practice in mining since it prevented an unnecessary buildup of underground water. Busby claimed that not 1 in 10 of the men were trained stone miners, that the rest had to be trained on the job. He also complained of their "vicious, drunken and idle habits" and alleged that they were often absent as they preferred to work illicitly on their own account in the town. False returns of work were made by their convict overseers. "One third of the time lost [could] be ascribed to the workmen, and the villainy of the overseers" sent to the bore. Such was the character of the men employed, that their acquired constant vigilance, though such was their character that Busby was afraid ever to enter the underground workings.' This is not surprising given the working conditions. The prisoners were often up to their waists in water. Most of the work was by pick through rock. Gunpowder was used occasionally, but when this occurred the blast fouled the air in the tunnel and filled it with smoke.

Work started at the Hyde Park end and progressed along South Head Road, now Oxford Street, turning west of that road at south Dowling Street, then across the west corner of Victoria Barracks to Moore Park Road. The route traversed several springs and low lying basins which drained into the bore. Thus by 1830, with the tunnel well short of the Lachlan Swamp, a pipe at Hyde Park began to supply pure, filtered water and the supply increased with the length of the bore. Offcuts from the tunnel also trapped sources of ground water.

In 1833, pipes were laid to the Port to allow ships to be supplied. In 1837 the tunnel reached a point near what is now the corner of Cook and Lang Roads. The only work outstanding was an open cut into the swamp itself and the construction of reservoirs or holding dams at each end. There is no evidence that these were ever built, though some sort of channel seems to have been cut at the south end of the tunnel. Major Barney, Commander of the Royal Engineers, was called to inspect the work. Although critical of the site of the tunnel Barney considered the structure to be of professional merit and fairly done. Starting in 1844, reticulation pipes were laid, allowing houses to be connected, as well as the establishment of a number of public fountains. In 1854, supply was supplemented with the installation of a small pumping station at the lower end of the swamp, as well as a number of small dams. In 1872, the Bore was cleaned and some irregularities removed, increasing the tunnel flow to about 4.5 megalitres (160×10^{3} cu ft) per day.

Busby, then 72 years old, retired to his property, Kirkton, between Branxton and Singleton in the Hunter Valley where he died in 1857.

The creation of a municipal water supply in the form of Busby's Bore highlighted the need for an administration to control its use. Municipal instructions were discussed for the colony in the early 1830s but met with fears in the community that such institutions would impose a burden of taxes or levies.

In 1842 the Sydney Corporation was formed. The Sydney Corporation endeavoured to squeeze as much revenue as possible from Busby's Bore and ignored public demands for planning towards the development of new and more suitable sources. In 1851 Sydney manufacturers expressed a total lack of confidence in the Sydney Corporation after its failure to fulfil its contracts with new industrial developments such as Tooth's Brewery and Sugar Company.

The length of time to complete the bore, that it relied on the simple mechanism of mechanical feed and that it and its successor, the Botany Bay Swamps Scheme, tied up land suitable for industrial development in water reserves had a significant impact on the shape and development of Sydney. The bore can also be seen as having a critical role in forcing the creation of municipal administration in the colony.

== Description ==
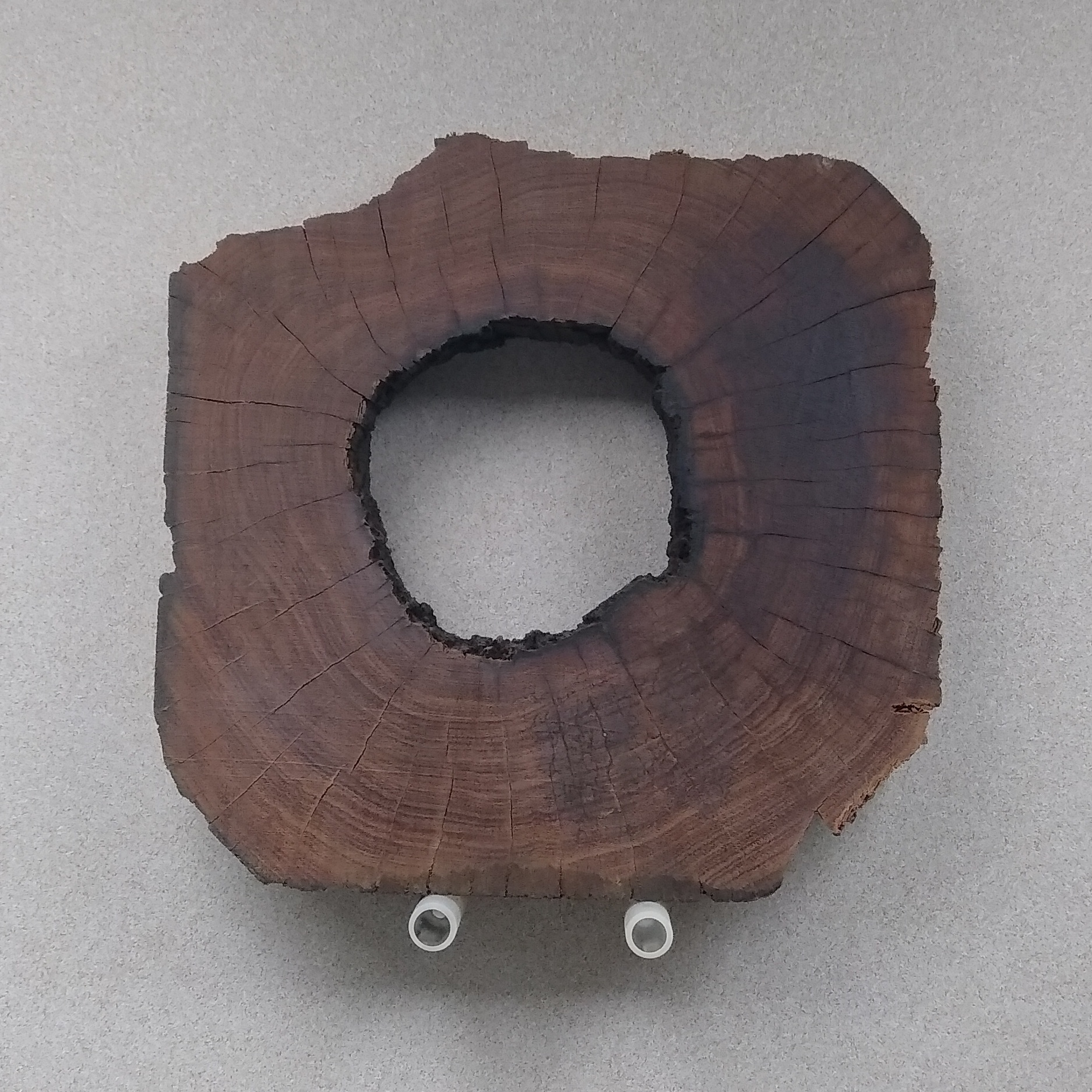
A section of wooden pipe from Busby's Bore, on display at the Powerhouse Museum (citation required, this part of pipe appears to be from the tank stream pipe)

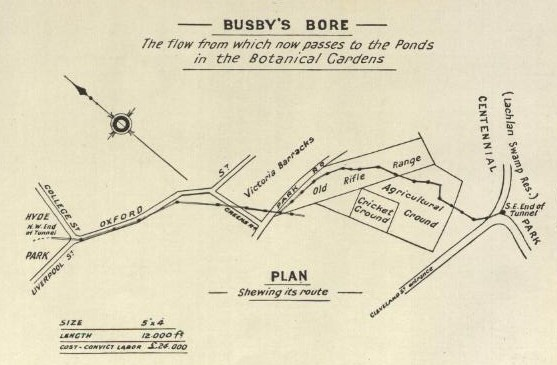
Map showing the route of the tunnel (1919).

The Bore was built by convict labour, mostly cut through solid sandstone. It averaged 1.5 metres (5 ft) high by 1.2 metres (4 ft) wide, though it varied from 0.9 metres (3 ft) by 0.9 metres (3 ft) to 3.4 metres (11 ft) high. The completed Bore delivered about 1.5 megalitres (330,000 imp gal; 400,000 US gal) water per day. Not all went to plan as there were injuries.

Starting in 1859, Busby's Bore was supplemented and later supplanted by water pumped from Botany Swamps. In 1934, part of the Bore under Oxford Street was filled with sand to remove the risk of subsidence under the tram lines.

The Bore remains under the ownership of Sydney Water. It is listed on the New South Wales Heritage Register and the former Register of the National Estate and is protected by a Permanent Conservation Order.

=== Condition ===
As at 30 July 1997, the archaeological potential is good. It is an intact example of its type.

=== Chronology ===
Key dates include:

- 1827 – Work started at Hyde Park
- 1830 – First water from springs encountered
- 1833 – Pipes from Hyde Park to supply shipping
- 1837 – Tunnel completed: 1.5 to 1.8 megalitres (53×10^{3} to 64×10^{3} cu ft) per day to water carts
- 1844 – General pipe reticulation
- 1872 – Refurbishment and cleanout of tunnel: 6 megalitres (210×10^{3} cu ft) per day
- 1881 – Some pipes laid inside tunnel in Oxford Street to reduce tainting from coal tar laid on road surface
- 1890 – Superseded by other schemes
- 1902 – Botanic Gardens supply only
- 1934 – Oxford Street section backfilled with sand when the weight of tram traffic caused stone slabs under Oxford Street to collapse
- 2004 – Proposal to reactivate Bore to supply city parks and gardens
- 2006 – NSW Government allocates funds for restoration of the Bore to supply parks of Sydney central business district.

== Commemorative items ==
- 1962 – A fountain was provided by Sydney City Council to commemorate "Sydney's second source of water and its first piped water supply." The fountain is situated in Hyde Park, near the corner of St James Road and Elizabeth Street, Sydney.
- 1988 – A cairn was placed in Centennial Park commemorating Busby's Bore, the centenary of the Water Board and the dedication of Centennial Park. The cairn is situated on Grand Drive, Centennial Park approximately 100 metres east of the Robertson Road Gates.

== Heritage listing ==
As at 10 September 1997, Busby's Bore is a unique engineering achievement which played a crucial role in the development of urban Sydney. As a product of convict labour and a major factor in the establishment of local administration in NSW (in the form of the Sydney Corporation) the bore is associated with the important steps that changed Sydney from penal colony to colonial trading port.

The fabric of the bore and associated archaeological deposits possess research potential relating to substantive historical and scientific questions relating to 19th century work and technology and to changes in the environment.

The intactness of the bore and the fact that it is still in use make it a rare survivor from the first half of the 19th century within urban Sydney.

Busby's Bore was listed on the New South Wales State Heritage Register on 2 April 1999 having satisfied the following criteria.

The place is important in demonstrating the course, or pattern, of cultural or natural history in New South Wales.

Busby's Bore, as a most important public work between 1827 and 1837 and Sydney's main water supply between 1837 and 1852, is a physical remnant of many of the major processes which have shaped modern Sydney.

Busby's Bore was an important factor leading to the establishment of the Sydney Corporation in 1842. It highlights the Colonial Government's lack of interest in managing the problems caused by Sydney's fast growing urban population.

The bore is associated with Busby and Commissioner Bigge and symbolises their aspirations for Sydney and themselves.

The place has a strong or special association with a particular community or cultural group in New South Wales for social, cultural or spiritual reasons.

Contemporary Community Esteem – The community has demonstrated its esteem for this item through the making of a Permanent Conservation Order. It is known to be valued by groups such as the Institute for Engineers, The National Trust and Local Historical Societies.

The place has potential to yield information that will contribute to an understanding of the cultural or natural history of New South Wales.

The bore's fabric possesses research potential regarding its construction techniques, the technology and materials available in the colony at the time, convict working conditions, the history of its use through changes made to it over time and the success of government regulation of the water supply through evidence of illegal entries.

The archaeological deposits surrounding the bore may also provide evidence of its use and construction. Archaeological deposits within the curtilage of the bore may possess research potential relating to; aboriginal occupation of the area, environmental changes since colonisation including the introduction of new species, grazing, draining of swamps and development and the development of the Royal Agricultural Society's Showground.

The place possesses uncommon, rare or endangered aspects of the cultural or natural history of New South Wales.

The intactness of this early 19th-century, convict-built water supply makes it a rare survivor from this period within urban Sydney.The main water supply to Sydney from 1837 to 1853.

The place is important in demonstrating the principal characteristics of a class of cultural or natural places/environments in New South Wales.

The bore is representative of English rock mining techniques of the period and of rock mining in other parts of Australia. It is also representative of public works carried out by convict labour and 19th century engineering techniques.

== Engineering heritage ==
The bore is listed as a national engineering landmark by Engineers Australia's Engineering Heritage Recognition Program.

== See also ==
- Sydney Water
