= John Busby =

English-born surveyor and civil engineer (1765 – 1857)

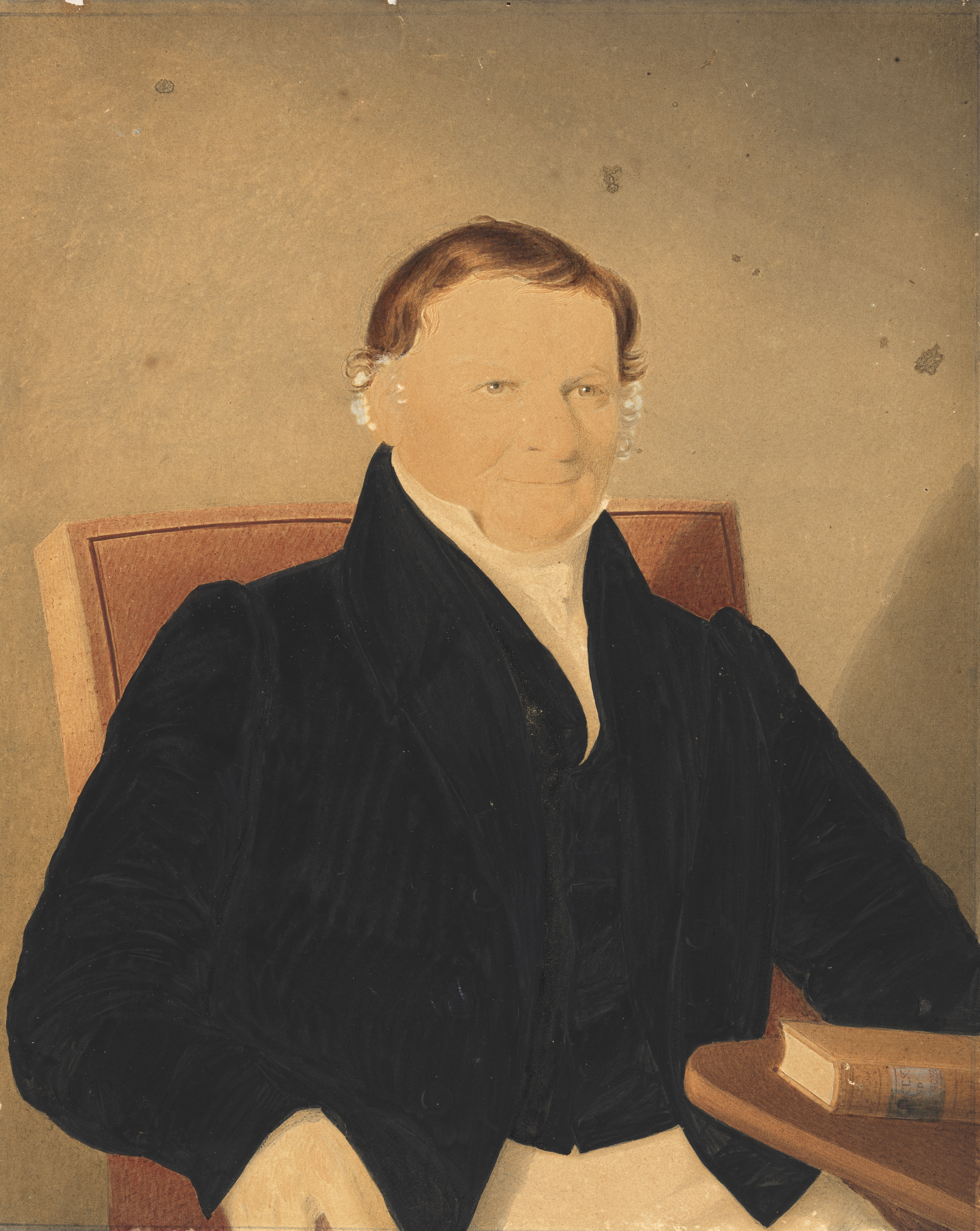
- Portrait of John Busby, May 1836, by Richard Read
- Born: 24 March 1765; Alnwick, Northumberland, England
- Died: 10 May 1857 (aged 92); Newcastle, New South Wales
- Occupation: engineer
- Notable work: Busby's Bore

John Busby (24 March 1765 – 10 May 1857) was an English-born surveyor and civil engineer, active in Australia.

== Early life ==
Busby was born in Alnwick, Northumberland, England, eldest son of George Busby, a miner and coalmaster of Stamford, and his wife Margaret, née Wilson, of Dunstan, Northumberland. Busby became a coal miner and later a mineral surveyor and civil engineer in Scotland, and was employed on various public work projects, including the provision of a water-supply for Leith fort. Busby received two of the Highland Society's awards; firstly for inventing machinery for ascertaining the nature of rock strata by boring, and secondly for developing a method of sinking through quicksands, clay and gravel beds. In 1810 he was employed on the Irish estate of the marquess of Downshire.

He married Sarah Kennedy in 1798 in Scotland. They had six sons and two daughters, all born in Scotland.

== Australia ==
Busby and his family emigrated to New South Wales, Australia.

Sydney's first efficient water supply became known as "Busby's Bore". In this he was assisted by his son, William.

== Late life ==
Busby retired to his country property Kirkton on the Hunter River which had been granted to him and died there on 10 May 1857. His grave and that of his wife is still preserved as of today at Kirkton (2011).

He was the father of James Busby, who is widely regarded as the "father" of the Australian wine industry.
