= Acacia forsythii =

Warrumbungle Range wattle

Scientific classification
- Kingdom: Plantae
- Clade: Tracheophytes
- Clade: Angiosperms
- Clade: Eudicots
- Clade: Rosids
- Order: Fabales
- Family: Fabaceae
- Subfamily: Caesalpinioideae
- Clade: Mimosoid clade
- Genus: Acacia
- Species: A. forsythii

Binomial name
- Acacia forsythii Maiden & Blakely

Synonyms
- Acacia forsythi Maiden & Blakely orth. var.; Racosperma forsythii (Maiden & Blakely) Pedley

Species of legume

Acacia forsythii, commonly known as Warrumbungle Range wattle, is a species of flowering plant in the family Fabaceae and is endemic to a restricted part of New South Wales, Australia. It is a bushy shrub with glabrous, red-brown branchlets, linear phyllodes, spherical heads of golden yellow flowers and narrowly oblong, leathery pods.

== Description ==
Acacia forsythii is a bushy shrub that typically grows to a height of 2 m (6 ft 7 in) and has glabrous, red-brown branchlets. Its phyllodes are on raised stem-projections, ascending to erect, linear, 60–100 mm (2.4–3.9 in) long and 2–5 mm (0.079–0.197 in) wide with a gland 4–14 mm (0.16–0.55 in) above the pulvinus. The flowers are borne in 5 to 10 spherical heads in axils on peduncles 5–7 mm (0.20–0.28 in) long, each head with 25 to 35 golden yellow flowers. Flowering mainly occurs in December and January, and the pods are narrowly oblong, up to 70 mm (2.8 in) long, 6–7 mm (0.24–0.28 in) wide, more or less leathery and slightly rounded over the seeds. The seeds are oblong, about 5 mm (0.20 in) long and dull black with a club-shaped aril.

== Taxonomy ==
Acacia forsythii was first formally described in 1927 by Joseph Maiden and Ernst Betche in the Journal and Proceedings of the Royal Society of New South Wales from specimens collected by William Forsyth in the Warrumbungle Range, between Coolah and Blackville in 1901. The specific epithet (forsythii) honours the collector of the type specimens, and "for many years the respected Superintendent of Centennial Park, Sydney".

== Distribution and habitat ==
Warrumbungle Range wattle is restricted to the Warrumbungle National Park in New South Wales, where it grows in sandy soils in open woodland in sheltered sites, mainly at higher altitudes.

== See also ==
- List of Acacia species
