= Centennial Parklands =

Trio of parks in Sydney, Australia

Centennial Park
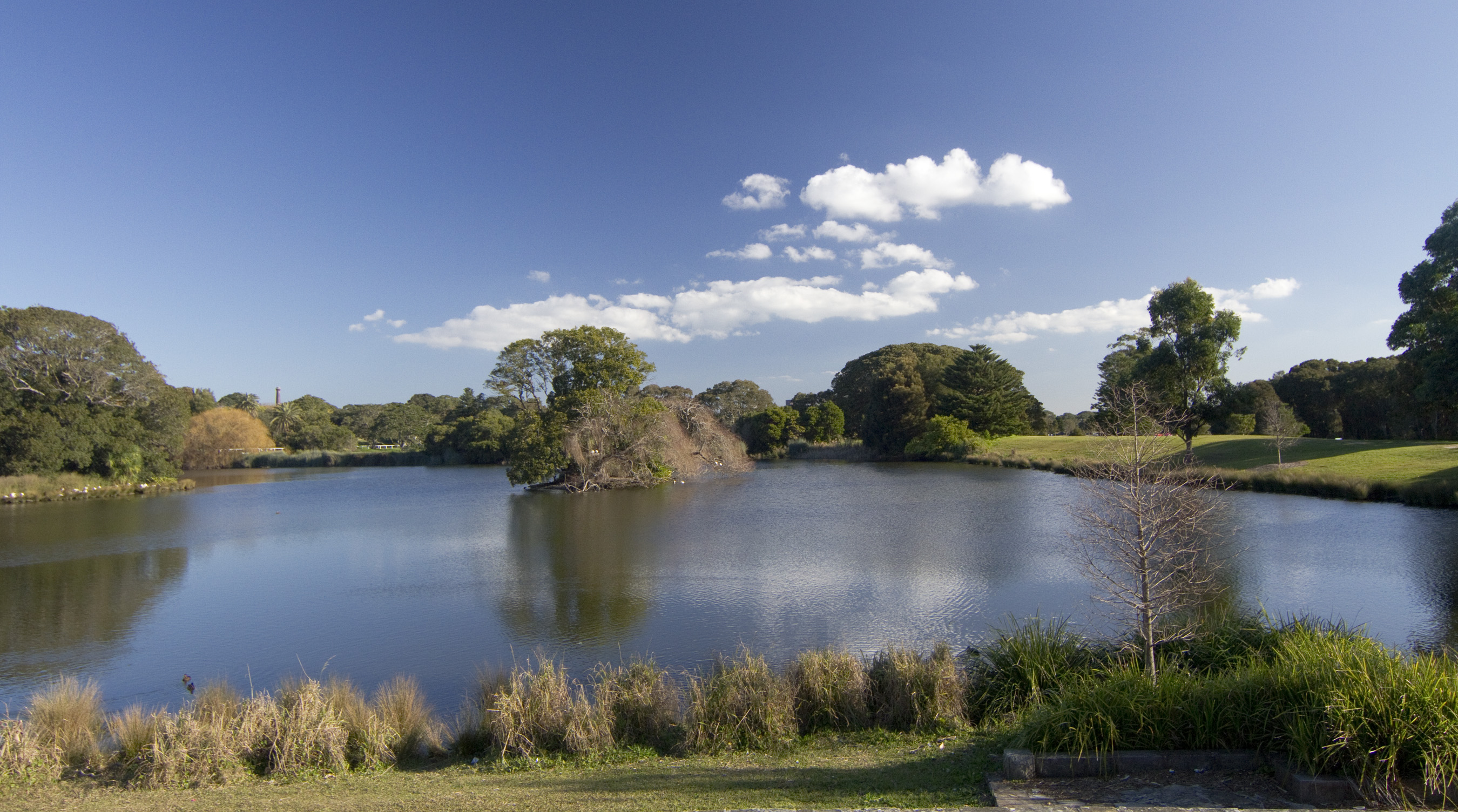
- Centennial Park

- Location within Sydney
- Type: Urban park
- Location: Eastern Suburbs of Sydney, New South Wales, Australia
- Coordinates: 33°53′56″S 151°13′55″E
- Area: 360 hectares (890 acres)
- Created: 1816
- Founder: Governor Lachlan Macquarie
- Operator: Centennial Park & Moore Park Trust trading as the Botanic Gardens and Centennial Parklands
- Open: Dawn to dusk
- Status: Open all year
- Designation: New South Wales Heritage Register
- Public transit: :: Bondi Junction; : Routes 333, 340, 352, 355, 389 & 440 : Moore Park and Royal Randwick
- Website: www.centennialparklands.com.au

New South Wales Heritage Register
- Official name: Centennial Park, Moore Park, Queens Park; Centennial Parklands; Sydney Common; Lachlan Swamps Water Reserve
- Type: State heritage (landscape)
- Criteria: a., c., d., e.
- Designated: 27 March 2000
- Reference no.: 1384
- Type: Urban Park
- Category: Parks, Gardens and Trees

Centennial Parklands is the name given to a group of three urban parklands located in the eastern suburbs of Sydney, New South Wales, Australia. Comprising approximately 360 hectares (890 acres), the lands encompass Centennial Park, Moore Park and Queens Park. The Parklands are listed on the New South Wales Heritage Register, with various components of national, state or local heritage significance. The parks are contained within the local government areas of City of Randwick, Waverley Municipal Council, and City of Sydney.

The parklands are managed by the Centennial Park & Moore Park Trust, trading as the Botanic Gardens and Centennial Parklands. The trust is administered by the Office of Environment & Heritage. The parklands were added to the New South Wales State Heritage Register on 27 March 2000.

Centennial Park is home to a number of wild animals including bird life, rabbits, and foxes. It is also home to a number of equestrian schools and other domestic animal endeavours such as the Centennial Park Rabbit Retreat, a boarding facility for rabbits.

== History ==
=== Pre-colonial history ===
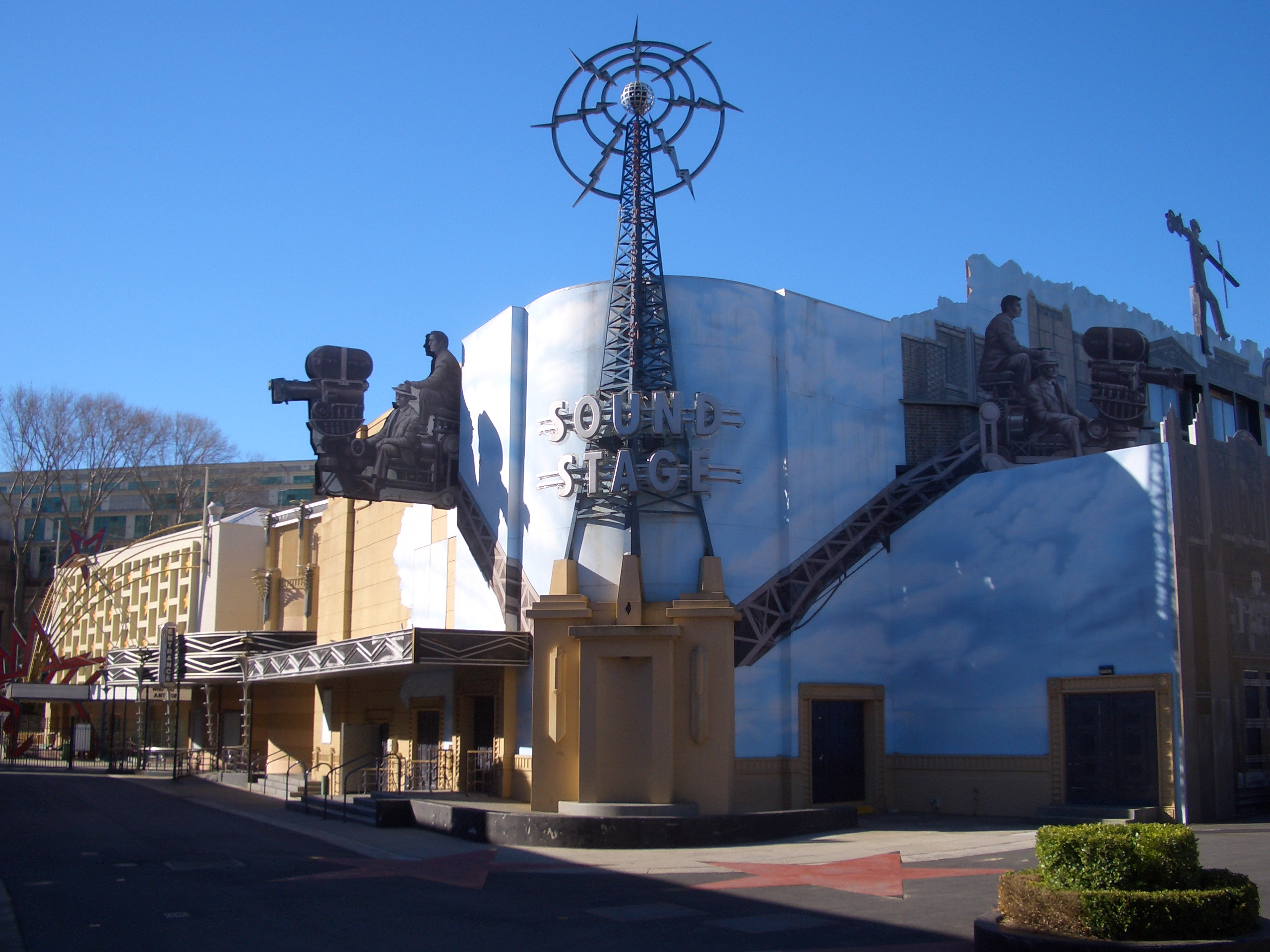
Entertainment Quarter, Sydney

The Parklands are constructed on lands that were traditionally in the custody of the Gadigal indigenous Australian people and are located between 3 and 6 kilometres (1.9 and 3.7 mi) south-east of the Sydney central business district.

The Centennial Parklands, as it stands today, represents 190 years of colonial history. The settlers had an immediate impact on the lives of the Gadi people whose clan territory takes in most of the Sydney peninsula. Gadi country extends between what is now Darling Harbour and South Head, and includes Centennial Park, Moore Park and Queens Park.

Close to where Centennial Park and Moore Park are today, an area that became known as the Kangaroo Ground was recorded on a map engraved by J. Walker in 1791 or 1793. This map shows the location of what the English called the Kangaroo Ground, in the clan territories of the Gadi. The richer soils and park like atmosphere observed here by Tench and others would almost certainly have been created through regular firing by the Gadi to keep the undergrowth clear and attract kangaroos and other large game to the area for hunting.

From 1882, part of the Parklands were used to house the Sydney Showground, the home of the popular Royal Agricultural Society of New South Wales' annual Easter Show, attracting up to 1 million people annually to the precinct. During the 1970s, it was recognised that the Showground facilities required significant investment, there was also a large green ban which prevented the construction of a sports stadium in the park. In 1988, a decision was made to relocate the showground facilities to land adjacent to Homebush Bay, and seven years later, it was resolved to redevelop the Moore Park Showground site into a movie production studio. The final Royal Easter Show held at Moore Park concluded during 1997.

During the Sydney 2000 Olympic Games and Sydney 2000 Paralympics, the parks hosted part of the road cycling events, the football, and formed part of the route for the marathons.

The Parklands is home to over 15,000 trees, 124 species of native land and water birds, and 18 introduced species of land and water birds. The responsibilities of the Centennial Park and Moore Park Trust cover low-lying wetlands, ornamental lakes, pine and native forests, expanses of grass, to playing fields, a golf course, tennis and netball courts and the Entertainment Quarter at nearby Moore Park.

=== Sydney Common ===
Centennial Parklands, comprising Centennial Park, Moore Park and Queens Park, are part of the Second Sydney Common.

As the settlement of Sydney began to develop it became necessary to set aside common land on the outskirts of the town. On 5 October 1811 Governor Macquarie proclaimed the 200 hectares (490 acres) to the south of South Head Road as the Sydney Common, for use by the public. The common land contained a vital resource in the form of a constant supply of pure water due to the natural aquifers present in the Botany Sands system. In 1820, Macquarie set aside the water reserve in the east of the Sydney Common. Between 1827 and 1838, Lachlan Water Tunnel was built providing a supply of freshwater to a terminal in Hyde Park. It remained Sydney Town's sole source of water supply until 1858, when it was supplanted by a scheme to pump water from the Botany Swamps, located further to the south.

This was Sydney's second common, an area of 400 hectares (1,000 acres).

==== Lachlan Swamps and water supply ====
The swamps, located within the Sydney Common, were naturally aquified and were an ideal source of water. In recognition of this precious resource, the Lachlan Water Reserve was founded in 1820. The Tank Stream supply of water for Sydney was inadequate and had a high level of pollutants, in 1825, the colonial government set up an enquiry into the use of the Lachlan Swamps to provide a water supply to Sydney. John Busby, a mineral surveyor, was appointed to design a water system to convey the water from the swamps to the town centre. Busby originally considered conveying the water using iron pipes, but assessed this would be too expensive. Finally he proposed a long tunnel be constructed, entirely through Crown Land.

==== Busby's Bore ====
The Lachlan Water Tunnel, better known as Busby's Bore, was Sydney's first piped water supply. The "Bore" or tunnel was, on average between 1.7 metres (5.5 ft) high by 1.4 metres (4.5 ft) wide and carried water from the Lachlan Swamps to Hyde Park. The whole length of the Tunnel was 3.7 kilometres (12,000 ft) and capable of holding 6.8 megalitres (1,500,000 imp gal) and 15 days' supply of water.

Sydney Council took control of the Water Supply in 1842 and was responsible for the whole of the Lachlan Water Reserve. In 1861, it was decided that the whole of the Sydney Common did in fact belong to the people of Sydney. Common land was given to the authority of the Municipal Council. Moore Park was then laid out. To meet increasing demands for water, portions of the Swamp were dammed in 1872, resulting in an embankment just below what is now known as Kensington ponds, and a series of seven dams throughout the swamp.

The first major development encroaching onto the Sydney Common was the siting of Victoria Barracks on the Old South Head Road (now Oxford Street) on the north east of the common. Designed in 1838 and completed ten years later, the Barracks was strategically sited between Port Jackson and Botany Bay to prevent an enemy invasion. The soldiers soon established the Military Garden, and by 1852 they had added the Garrison Cricket ground and a rifle range on land to the south of the barracks. In 1866 the Sydney Common was given to the Municipal Council of Sydney for development under the Sydney Common Improvement Bill of 1866.

=== A public park ===
In the second half of the nineteenth century, parts of Sydney Common were made into parkland. Lord Carrington, the Governor of NSW 1885–1890, advocated the city of Sydney should have a large recreational space in the fashion of a "grand park". Sir Henry Parkes, the premier, recognized the potential of this proposal and facilitated its realisation.

Charles Moore, Mayor of Sydney from 1867 to 1869, worked on developing a public park for the recreation of the people of Sydney. Allotments of land alongside the South Head Road (Old South Head Road, now Oxford Street) were sold to fund the developments and soon Moore had overseen the construction of Randwick and Moore Park Roads and the creation of a public park incorporating the land around them. Charles Moore, Director of the Sydney Botanic Gardens, supplied the distinctive tree plantations.

Botanist Charles Moore had visited the 1867 Exposition Universelle in Paris – in the company of his brother, David (Director of the Glasnevin Botanic Garden, Dublin) and their friend, influential ex-pat Irish garden writer William Robinson (whose "Gleamings from French Gardens" was shortly thereafter serialised in the Sydney Mail newspaper. Later in 1884, Charles Moore appointed French-trained gardener James Jones to the staff of Sydney Botanic Garden. Moore and Jones along with engineer Frederick Franklin (who had worked with horticulturist/engineer Joseph Paxton of London's 1851 Crystal Palace fame) were responsible for the layout of Sydney's Centennial Park (1886–87), a remarkable translation of the great public parks being created in Britain and east-coast America at that time.

=== Moore Park ===
In 1866 Sydney City Council dedicated 153 hectares (380 acres) of the north west section of Sydney Common as a recreation ground for the public to help alleviate growing pressures for outdoor activities, particularly organised sports. The area was named Moore Park in 1867 after Charles Moore JP, Mayor of Sydney City Council 1867–1869. Moore Park became the focus for major sporting events and entertainment facilities with the establishment of the Zoological Gardens in 1879, the Royal Agricultural Society Showground (which would later become the venue for Sydney's annual 'Royal Easter Show') and the first course of the Australian Golf Club in 1882.

At the time of dedication, Moore Park was bounded to the south by Lachlan Estate and Randwick Racecourse, to the west by Dowling Street, to the north by Old South Head Road, and to the east by the Lachlan Water Reserve. A road lined with stone pines (Pinus pinea) marked this eastern boundary of the park and the western boundary of the water reserve. Two other roads crossed Moore Park prior to 1866; the first was known as Old Botany Road and was used by hunters and fisherman initially and later by pleasure seekers traveling to Coogee and Botany. The second road provided a western entrance to a cemetery that was located off South Dowling Street. The dedicated land encompassed the Tunnel Reserve (1827–1838), the Military Barracks and the Military Cricket Ground.

Moore Park consisted of a series of gently rolling hills, three water bodies and varied scrub vegetation. Commonly known as the Sand Hills, the land was prone to erosion. By the mid 19th century, the land was degraded and barren, more a result of years of timber getting, pillaging and dumping than of inherent environmental qualities. The removal of timber in particular had led to erosion problems, so that by the early 1860s Charles Moore, the alderman, and botanist, collaborated to stabilize the soils with plantings of indigenous shrubs and couch grass. The shrubs failed, but the couch grass succeeded quickly, and sparked discussion about the loss of native vegetation.

Four of the sand hills were conspicuous enough to be named: Mount Steele, Mount Rennie, Constitution Hill and Mount Lang. However, in the process of transforming the common into parkland, these hills were modified greatly. Today, Mount Steele is the least altered of the four; Mt. Rennie was reconfigured as a platform for Golf Clubhouse in 1926, Mt. Lang, across from the NSW Cricket Ground, was terraced and ramped for unknown reasons and disappeared after the 1940s. The fate of Constitution Hill is not clear. The Moore Park Golf Course (established in 1926 and continuously modified) has taken advantage of and modified the gently rolling topography in establishing fairways.

Different areas of what is now Centennial Parklands came under different administrations. These differences have contributed to the individuality of the different areas within Centennial Parklands today.

More developments began to be built in Moore Park. The Sydney Zoological Gardens were opened in 1879, on what is now the site of Sydney Boy's and Girl's High Schools. These were Sydney's second zoo, after one from the early 1860s in the Botanic Gardens (1862). The Zoo ceased to exist on the Moore Park site in 1916 and the animals were transferred by ferry to the newly constructed zoo site at Taronga Park (Sydney's third zoo).

The establishment of the Sydney Cricket Ground, the new Royal Agricultural Society Showground and the laying out of the first course of the Australian Golf Club all took place in 1882. The adjacent Sydney Sports Ground opened in 1903 and is now the site of the Sydney Football Stadium. This stadium precinct has hosted cricket since the mid-1850s and football (all codes) from the early 1880s. First grade rugby union, soccer and Australian rules games were played earlier in Moore Park on the adjacent open fields to the west, beginning with the Wallaroo FC (rugby) in 1871.The Royal Agricultural Society created the Sydney Showground, home of the Royal Easter Show from 1882 to 1997, when it moved to Olympic Park at Homebush Bay.

The population boom during the second half of the 19th century, as well as the extension of leisure time for workers, meant public participation in the park increased. This public interest in the park led to the dedication of the Sydney Sports Ground in 1899, and the E. S. Marks Athletics Field in 1906. These developments in addition to the allotments of land sold during the 1860s have contributed to reducing the size of Moore Park from its original 153 hectares (378 acres) to 120 hectares (296 acres) today.

In 1886, 65% of Sydney's population lived within an eight-point-zero-kilometre (five-mile) radius of the Lachlan Swamps, and this site was chosen as the location for a grand vision of public recreation. This vision was to provide a suburban drive and landscaped park for the people of Sydney. In 1914 was the first delivery of airmail in Australia. From July 16–18 French airman, Maurice Guillaux flew from the Melbourne Showground to Moore Park, Sydney Showground. A re-enactment flight was scheduled for July 2014. In 2016 Moore Park celebrated 150 years since its creation, when Sydney City Council set aside part of the Lachlan Swamps area for a public park, and named Moore Park in 1867 after the then Mayor.

=== Queens Park ===
Queens Park, a smaller park located at the eastern edge of Centennial Park, was also created by the Centennial Celebrations Act of 1887 but was not fully developed because of drainage problems. By 1895 it contained an eleven-hole golf course, which was relocated to Botany in 1899. Since the 1930s Queens Park has been used as a sports field by Christian Brothers College, Waverley and various local sporting groups. Since then, the 26-hectare (64-acre) urban park has kept its sporting connection and now contains a number of playing fields built in the 1930s.

Queens Park was reclaimed from the extensive swamp in Lachlan Reserve. A dam occupied the low-lying areas in Queens Park for most of the 1800s. The earliest phase of tree planting in Queens Park occurred in the late 1880s and early 1890s with open woodland of Moreton Bay fig, Port Jackson figs, Monterey pine, Araucarias and holm oak established on the higher ground. The sandstone outcrops may have already been overgrown with the locally indigenous Port Jackson figs, ferns and acacias which are now quite a striking feature of the north eastern corner the park. The coral trees and paperbarks lining the southern and western edges of the park were planted in 1923, replacing original plantings of alternating brush box and maples. The dates of other plantings in Queens Park are not clear.

Queens Park has always been popular with the local community. The park has adapted to the needs of the local residents over the years but with its open spaces and panoramic views of the city skyline, it remains an important part of the parklands landscape.

=== Centennial Park ===
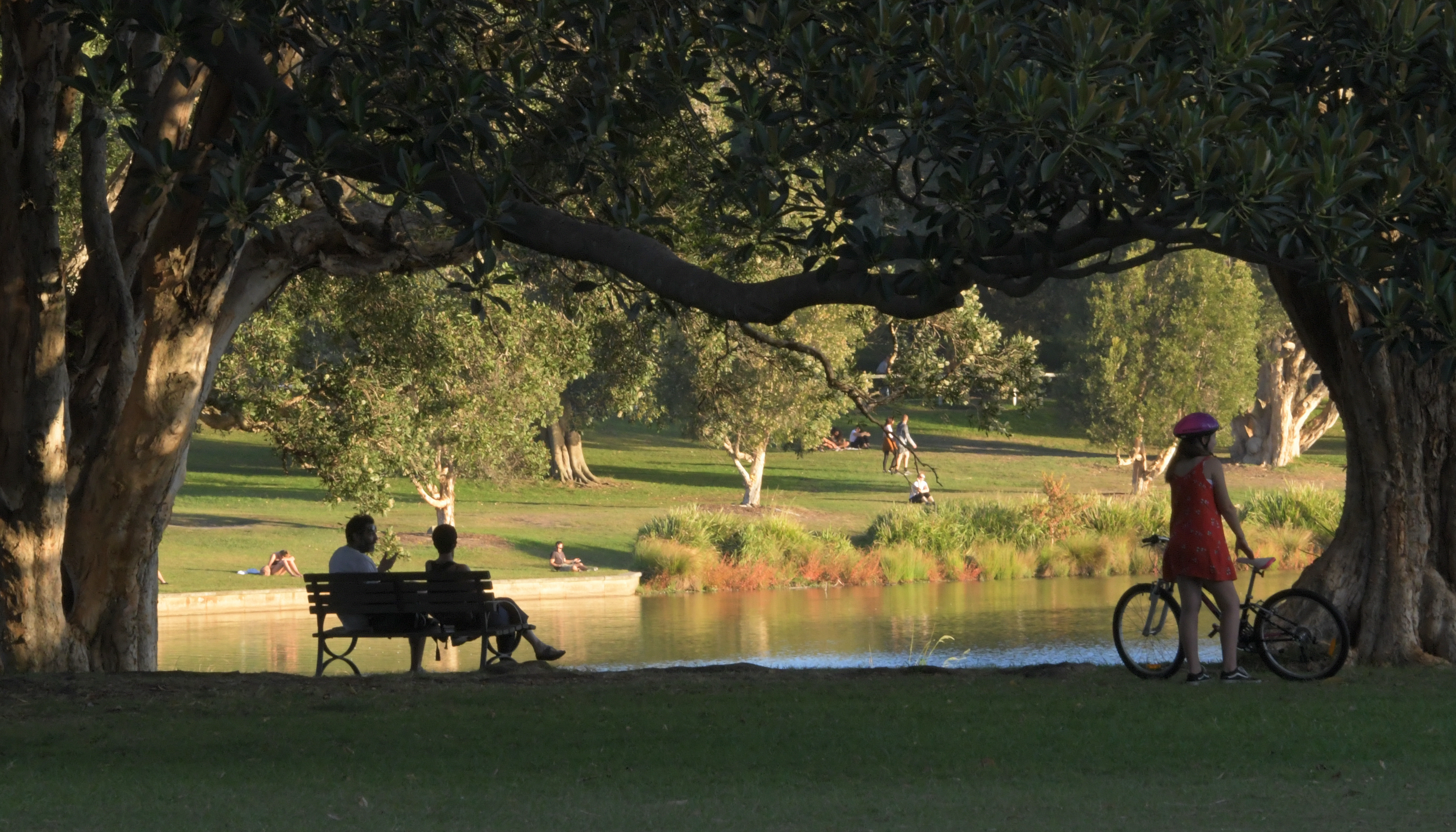
Centennial Park.

The Centenary Bill was presented to Parliament on 27 June 1887 introducing the notion of a park that would be accessible to the whole mass of people down to the very poorest class of the community. It would also transform what was regarded as an unsightly area into a region of loveliness and beauty. Centennial Park was created by the Centennial Celebrations Act 1887 to commemorate the 100th anniversary of the colony. This Act, however, did not define the appropriate uses of the park.

The park was established to commemorate Australia's centenary in 1888 and was opened on 26 January 1888 by Sir Henry Parkes. He stated that "this grand park is emphatically the people's park, and you must always take as much interest in it as if by your own hands you had planted the flowers, the park will be one of the grandest adornments to this beautiful country."

The newly named Centennial Park became the focus for the Centenary celebration preparations. Frederick Franklin, an English civil engineer, appears to have prepared the original design of the park, although historically the preservation and development of the Reserve as Centennial Park is credited to Lord Carrington, Sir Henry Parkes and Charles Moore.

The layout and landscape design of the park is attributed to Charles Moore, the Director of the Botanic Gardens from 1848 to 1896 (but no connection with Charles Moore, Mayor). Moore enlisted the labour of the unemployed to transform the native scrubland into an open expanse of public land. James Jones, head gardener of the Botanic Gardens became the General Overseer of Centennial Park and diary entries in his Day Book indicate that he played a significant part in its construction, although his desire to conserve the native flora of the area was not fulfilled.

Charles Moore was charged with the task of converting 640 acres (259 hectares) of sandy native scrub into a grand Victorian park in the space of just seven months. The park was to be designed in accordance with a plan prepared by J W Deering, District Surveyor of the Department of Lands. Whose plan was finally used remains uncertain but it appears that the principal elements of a concept developed by Frederick Augustus Franklin, an English civil engineer, were followed. Franklin had studied under Sir Joseph Paxton and the original design elements for Centennial Park bear similarities to Paxton's Birkenhead Park and the grounds of the Crystal Palace at Sydenham.

By the 1880s, Moore's influence on the planting and laying out of parks in Sydney was at its peak and coincided with a general boom in park creation. His preference for and extensive use of Moreton Bay Fig for public plantings in Sydney during his time as director is well documented and commented upon by many of his contemporaries. Indeed, some members of the public bemoaned his use of "the inevitable Moreton Bay Fig" in the planting of Centennial Park.

James Jones, the Head Gardener of the Botanic Gardens and Overseer of the Centennial Park from 1887 to 1892 assisted Moore in his task. In his Day Book Jones has left a record of the Herculean effort required to clear vegetation, alter landforms, groom slopes, create open spaces and construct the Grand Drive and subsidiary roads, under the pressure of a looming opening date. Work included blasting of trenches in the sandstone to create sufficient depth for tree growth. The extensive clearing of the native vegetation had revealed just how unsuitable much of the park was for such an activity.

The opening of Centennial Park on 26 January 1888 was a central event in the midst of a week of Centenary celebrations and Sir Henry Parkes declared it as the "People's Park". After the opening, work continued in the park with the construction of ornamental ponds and islands. Also, in accordance with the fashions of the period monuments were added to the landscape and by 1889 there were eleven statues and two vases in the park. The Superintendent's Residence was completed in 1888, while the perimeter fence was completed in 1892. Later in the 1890s, the Ranger's Residence and Shelter Pavilion were constructed.

A tree planting ceremony held on Australia Day 1889, attended by some 40,000 spectators, was officiated by Charles Moore. Guests of note included Lord and Lady Carrington, the latter of whom planted the first tree (a Cook's pine, Araucaria columnaris)) and a collection of "Governors (and notables)". Prior to this ceremony, the park was largely transformed by hundreds of unemployed men enlisted to turn swamps, scrub and rock into the grand park it would become ("In Brief", in "Parklands", Summer 2011/12, 3).

One of the earliest constructed elements in the Park and the main drive around the Park, Grand Drive was originally planted in 1889 with a range of species including figs, elms, poplars and pines (including Norfolk Island pines and Monterey pines).

William Forsyth was overseer of Centennial Park from 1892 to his death in 1911 and much of the successful horticultural development of the park during the first decade of the century has been attributed to his botanical knowledge and labours.

Joseph Maiden took over the administration of the park following the retirement of Charles Moore in 1896. Maiden had his own stylistic ideas and his work had an important impact on the development of the park. He pioneered the experimentation and use of Australian native plants, introducing a more "tropical" flavour to the park's design and the introduction of more colourful species. The natural conditions of poor soil fertility, exposure and limited rainfall combined to produce a hostile environment for the park plantings. Many of the exotic trees planted by Moore withered away and Maiden noted the unsuitability of some tree species first chosen for the park. Maiden increased the areas under "horticultural treatment" and established a plant nursery to grow new plants because he believed "they are more likely to grow well from the start if raised in the same kind of soil as they are to be ultimately planted in." By 1912 the park was producing 150,000 plants a year and these were used to create flowerbeds and shrubberies. These ornamental plantings were strategically placed around the northern shores of the main lakes and along the central roadways. They became a focus for the park and a popular destination for recreational visitors. Maiden also oversaw the use of the park for historic events, Military Reviews and public activities

Working with J. H. Maiden, Forsyth introduced palms, Port Jackson fig, paperbark, acacia, and coral trees to the park. Drought and storm damage were as much of a challenge as identifying species suitable for the harsh and varied conditions in the park. The need for protection of the remnant native vegetation in the Park was frequently advocated by Forsyth in his annual reports, and experimentation with native trees, particularly eucalypts, was escalated under Forsyth's direction. In 1901, 263 eucalypts representing 18 different species were planted, and the end of the same year 1901 Forsyth reported that the number of tree species growing in the Park was 'about seventy, the total number of plants about 4,411. Of this number about 675 are planted on the Grand Drive and approaches, 321 are in Queens Park, and the remainder distributed over the Centennial Park. The grove of turpentines planted in 1905 between the Kiosk and the Bird Sanctuary is evidence of the extensive experimentation with native trees of this period.

One of Forsyth's most significant contributions was the selection of paperbarks to serve the several purposes - aesthetic, shade and windbreak. The establishment of windbreaks was essential to provide protection to the large quantity of young trees that had been planted in the park. Forsyth planted 88 of these trees in August 1896; although Forsyth did not specify locations these may be trees at the toe of the Busby Pond Embankment, and the grove adjacent to the Lily Pond. The success of this first planting led to their continued use, and in 1899 the avenue of trees lining the watercourse below the Paddington Gates was planted. A clump of Eucalyptus robusta was planted just west of these at the same time.

Forsyth undertook extensive modifications to the trees planted along Grand Drive and approaches by Moore and Jones 1889. He removed elms, poplars and pines, and replaced them from 1897 onwards with a complex formal arrangement of predominantly Port Jackson figs (Ficus rubiginosa), with holm/ holly oak (Quercus ilex) and Norfolk Island pine (Araucaria heterophylla). The rhythmic pattern created by the diagonal planting creates a strong landscape character in the Victorian Gardenesque tradition.

This combination set the pattern for subsequent plantings in the park, particularly along the roads. In the 1890s Carrington Drive was lined with a discontinuous avenue of Port Jackson figs, and at about the same time Loch Avenue was planted with belt planting of predominantly Port Jackson figs and Norfolk Island pines to hide the Waverley tram sheds. This work was followed over the next few years by additional rows of trees lining the park roads. In 1900, figs were planted along Jervois avenue and around the same time, Parkes Drive North was planted with a row of Port Jackson figs.

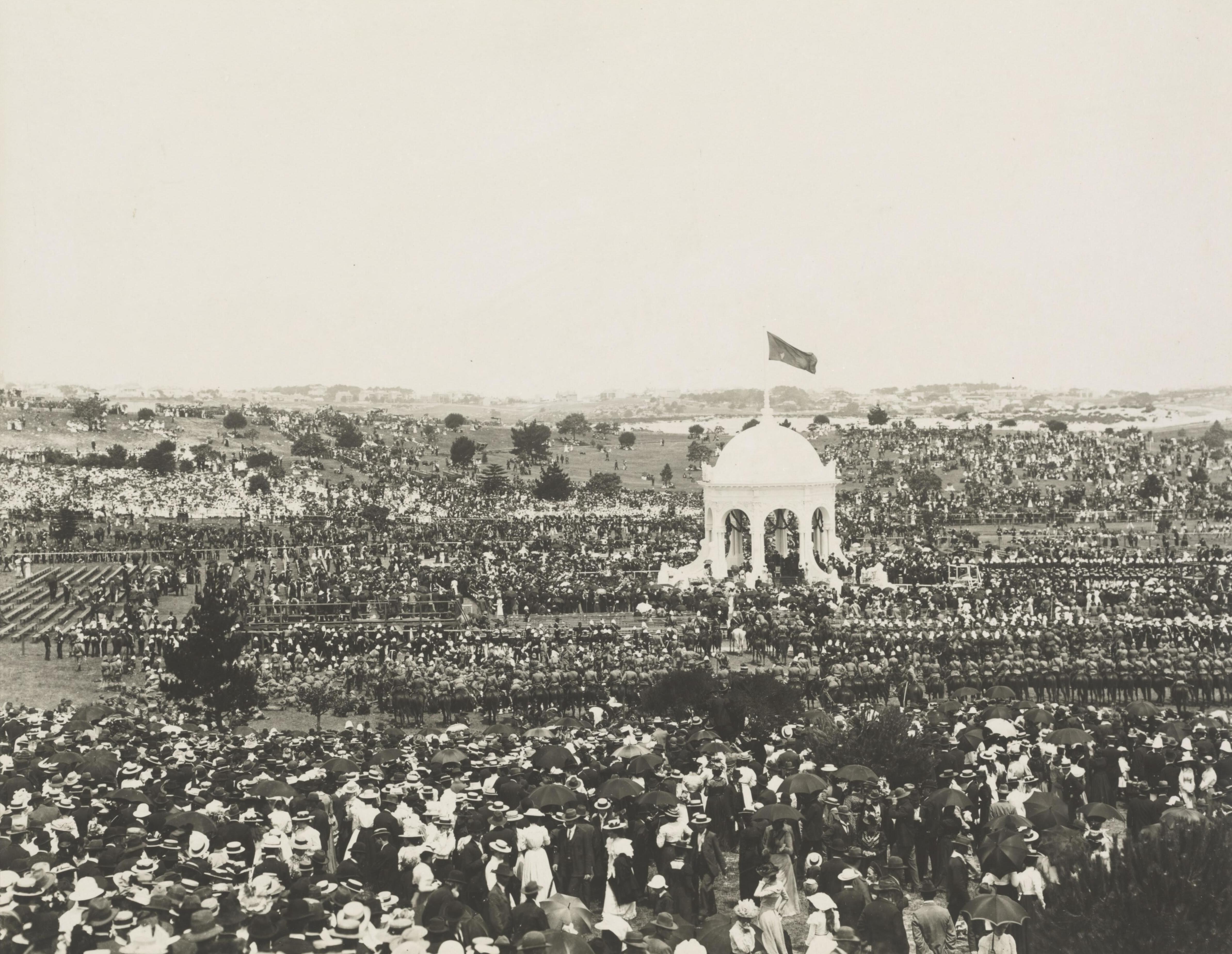
Centennial Park on 1 January 1901, with the Federation Pavilion at centre

On 1 January 1901, Centennial Park was the site of the official ceremony to mark the federation of the Australian colonies and the inauguration of the Commonwealth of Australia. The ceremony was accompanied by much pomp and was attended by a vast crowd of 60,000 onlookers. At a special pavilion erected in the park, Lord Hopetoun and Edmund Barton were sworn in respectively as the first governor-general and the first Prime Minister of the new Australian nation. At the same time, the first federal cabinet was worn in. The oaths of office were administered by the Lieutenant-Governor and Chief Justice of New South Wales, Sir Frederick Darley.

The pavilion at which the swearing-in ceremony took place was raised on a platform consisting of a huge slab of Moruya granite with six sides to represent the original six states of the federation. Known as the Commonwealth Stone, the slab was later, in 1904, embedded in the ground as a permanent memorial to mark the exact spot where the Commonwealth came into being. The pavilion itself had been removed in 1903 and re-erected in Cabarita Park, though it was now stripped of all its original ornamentation.

A new and permanent Federation Pavilion, designed by Sydney architect Alec Tzannes in Post-Modern style and evoking the form of a classical rotunda, was erected over the granite slab in 1988, the Bicentennial Year of European Settlement. The interior of the dome was embellished by artist Imants Tillers. Below the dome, a sandstone frieze runs around the outside of the structure and contains the words "Mammon or Millennial Eden". The words were taken from a sonnet called "Australia" which was written by Bernard O'Dowd in 1901. This history only relates to the federation aspects of the place. Other aspects of the place have not been considered.

Palms were introduced in 1901 in Frog Hollow, and Forsyth reported that year on their success and appeal. The southern part of Frog Hollow was developed under Maiden's direction as a focus for floral displays in the Gardenesque tradition and reflected the influence and rise of the flower garden in the Federation period. As a result, In addition to Forsyth's palms, the three small promontories that jut into Busby's Pond have a number of horticultural attractions including the Rosarium, Native Plant & Flower Garden and the column monuments as well as numerous circular floral beds. A number of changes have been in this area since Maiden's time, but the overall character is attributed to his influence.

From 1902, Maiden and Forsyth used palms and coral trees in linear plantings throughout the park, providing an element of contrast to the umbrageous character of the fig dominated avenues. Under Maiden's influence, an avenue comprising alternating plantings of Queen palm and Cocos Island palm was established along the Busby's Pond embankment, and an avenue of coral trees (Erythrina sp.) in Loch Avenue was mixed with occasional remnants of earlier and poorly performing planting of Port Jackson figs and holm oaks.

Between 1908 and 1910 the length of Parkes Drive between Grand Drive was planted with rows of Canary Island palms (Phoenix canariensis). This is the earliest known formal avenue of Canary Island palms in Sydney and led to the widespread use of this palm throughout New South Wales. In the years immediately following, palms were used extensively in Centennial Park and Moore Park. An avenue of Senegal date palm (P. reclinata), was planted in 1912 in a diagonal pattern along the western embankment of the Randwick Pond. In 1913 more than one hundred palms were planted, of the following species and varieties: coral trees (Erythrina edulis), Indian wild date (Phoenix rupicola), African wild date (P.reclinata), dwarf Mediterranean fan palm (Chamaerops humilis), Chamaerops excelsa, Canary Island palm, jelly palm (Cocos (now Butia) yatay), Lord Howe Island (Kentia fosteriana) palms and Areca sapida. Locations for these trees are not clear, but may have included the palms lining the northern side of Dickens Drive, planted in 1915, regularly spaced row of palms to reinforce the successful 1908 palm avenue along Parkes Drive. Palms were also used as a replacement species for earlier avenue plantings; in 1916 Canary Island palms and Strelitzia replaced two avenues of poplars, a species which proved less successful in the park.

Woodland plantings on the Lang Road slopes and the York Road slopes provided a transparent enclosure for the park, but the planting along York Road, dating to 1911 is slightly denser to screen the tram works from the park.

The Department of Agriculture took charge of the administration in 1908. Following the death in 1923 of James Dawes and the retirement of Maiden in 1924, development of the park slowed considerably. Numerous administrative and staff changes occurred due to the Department of Agriculture taking over the administration from the Sydney Botanic Gardens. Reduced budgets resulted in a period of relatively inactivity and a general lack of documentation for works that were done. There was a large grant for unemployment relief in 1934 but there is little detail of tree planting during the 1930s.

From the 1960s through the 1970s, there was a renewed interest in tree planting in Centennial Park, today several large stands of pines, including the pine plantation on the Mission Fields established c. 1960s as a boundary planting and windbreak for the equestrian grounds. A grove of paperbarks (Melaleuca quinquenervia), planted c. 1970s on a filled former drainage line in the Mission Fields demonstrates the continued influence of Maiden's planting principles. A grove of maritime pine (Pinus pinaster) planted on the Parade Ground on Arbor Day, 1967 demonstrates the continuing tradition of Arbor Day and Wattle Day celebrations.

A grove of spotted gum (Corymbia maculata) near the Woollahra Gates, mostly planted since the late 1960s represents the revival of experimentation with native species in the Centennial Park, a result of the influence of Ron Selkeld, Park Superintendent in 1965. This hill top area is exposed to southerly winds where spotted gum had grown vigorously but mugga ironbark planted (Eucalyptus leucoxylon) earlier did not thrive. Clumps of mainly scribbly gum were planted on the sandstone outcrops from the 1960s. The Scribbly Gums grouped around the outcrops provide a wild and picturesque effect and contrast with the more formal plantings that dominate the avenues in the parklands. At about the same time, some three hundred flooded gum trees (Euc.grandis) were planted out on the hillside to the south of Broom Avenue. In 1968, an article in The Land newspaper highlighted the need to find species suitable for the "light fine soil" of Centennial Park. The article stressed the value of the Park as "a great testing ground" particularly for native species for coastal planting.

In 1984, the Centennial Park & Moore Park Trust was appointed to administer all of Centennial Park and Queens Park. In 1990 the Centennial Park & Moore Park Trust (Trust) was appointed to administer Moore Park, including the Moore Park Golf course and in 1992 the E.S. Marks Field. The Trust administers Centennial Parklands in accordance with the Centennial Park and Moore Park Trust Act 1983.

Renewal throughout the 1990s included the involvement of John Lennis (1952–2015) Aboriginal "bush tutor" with the Guriwal Aboriginal Corporation at La Perouse, then Aboriginal Education Officer with the Royal Botanic Gardens & Domain Trust. He advised on establishing the native plantings and walks at Ash Paddock and Lachlan Swamps. He also was responsible for the Cadi Jam Ora — First Encounters Garden in the Royal Botanic Garden.

=== Special events ===
The provision of grand open spaces has tended to invite military parades and reviews throughout the history of Sydney. The first such events were held on the parade ground in the (Hyde Park) barracks square. As other preferable venues became available these events moved; first to the Domain, then Moore Park and ultimately Centennial Park. Large public displays were held on the Queens Birthday, other public holidays and on significant anniversaries such as Jubilees and Centenaries. In 1888, the Long Meadow in Centennial Park was used for the annual Military Review. In 1908, Australian troops participated in a review to celebrate the "Great White Fleet" visit. A celebration was held in 1954 when Queen Elizabeth visited Centennial Park.

The Royal Agricultural Society was allowed to use the park at show time in 1865. The exhibitions were very popular, and in December 1887 one Sydney resident wrote a letter to the editor of the Sydney Morning Herald, saying that the only celebration he was looking forward to was the Agriculture Society (of NSW)'s exhibition planned for 26 January 1888. The Showground was a major attraction for generations of Australians.

The Parklands has always provided a venue for special events including conventions, exhibitions, film productions, sporting events, the Sydney Gay and Lesbian Mardi Gras as well as the Royal Easter Show. In recent years Centennial Park has developed its capacity to hold special events. Recently the parklands have played host to a number of events such as Dame Kiri Te Kanawa, Big Bold and Brassy, Hermes International Show jumping and Concert for Life. The Parklands was also an open-air venue for the Sydney 2000 Olympic and Paralympic Games road cycling and marathon events.

In 2007 the Rugby Centre for Excellence and in 2008 the Sports Medicine Clinic were constructed in Moore Park.

In 2013 the park celebrated its 125th anniversary with various celebrations. A ten-day light garden in January from the Paddington Gates down to Centennial Parklands Dining highlighted that area, a tree planting on Australia Day, development of the Park's inaugural master plan and construction of the first ever children's garden occurred throughout the year. Executive officer Peter Hadfield called on the state and federal governments to commit $20m to establish a future fund for the park.

Rebecca Giles, governor of the Centennial Parklands Foundation, notes rising private philanthropy stepping into the budget gap left by a withdrawing NSW Government. Examples of New York's Central Park's Conservancy were cited. Since January Ms Giles cited a record $1.5m grant for a children's play garden from the Ian Potter Foundation; $500,000 for a labyrinth project, $100,000 from Tiffany & Co. to improve the Woollahra gates and $45,000 for disabled access improvements at Moore Park Golf Course.

== Centennial Park ==
Centennial Park, with 189 hectares (470 acres), is the largest of the three parks that make up the Centennial Parklands. Centennial Park comprises 2.2 square kilometres (0.85 sq mi) of open space and lightly wooded grounds located within the City of Randwick. It was originally swampland, known as Lachlan Swamps. Centennial Park is one of Australia's most famous parks and is listed on the Register of the National Estate; and is a grand park in the Victorian period tradition featuring formal gardens, ponds, grand avenues, statues, historic buildings and sporting fields.

=== History ===
Centennial Park was set aside by Governor Macquarie in 1811 and was developed as water reserve and common grazing land.

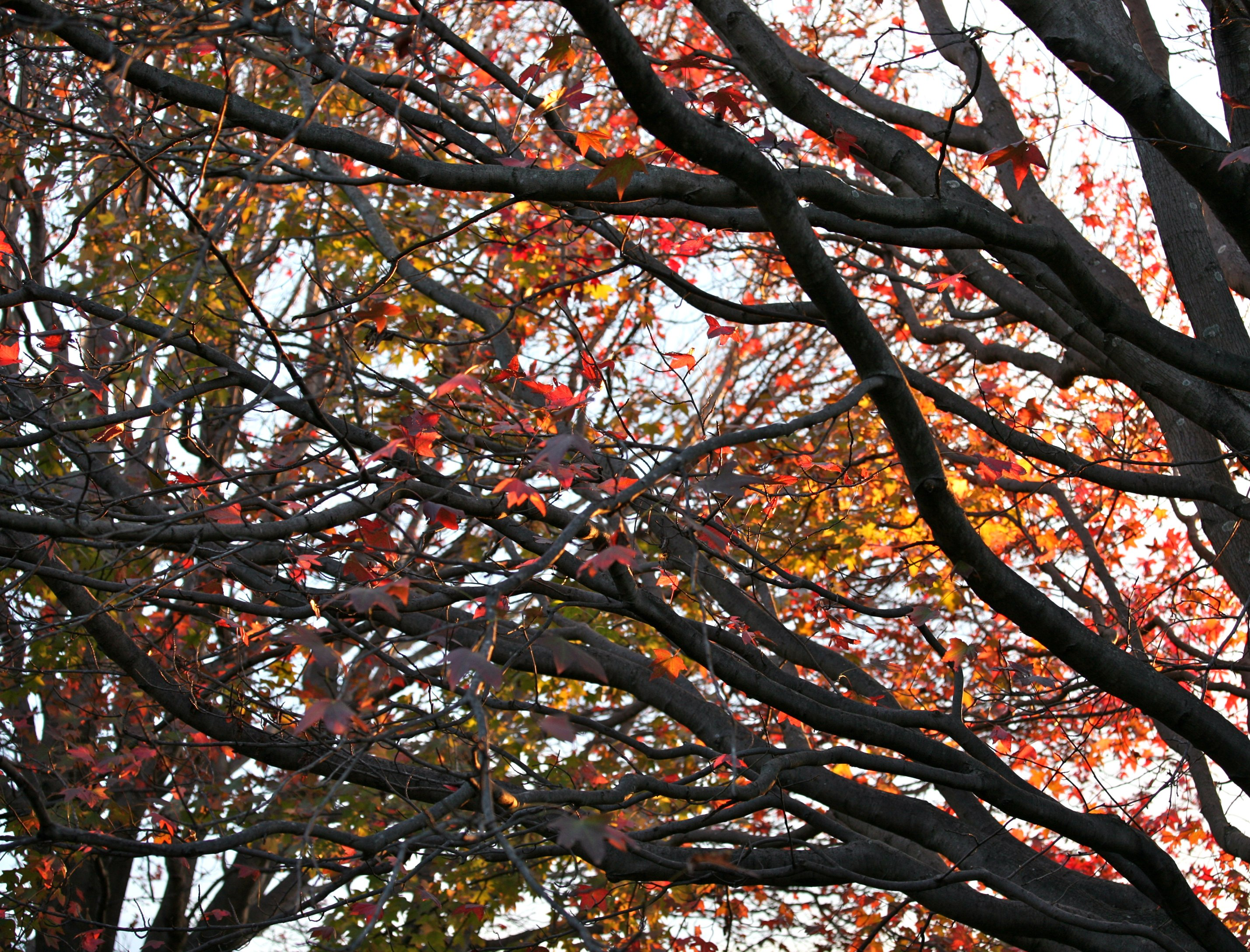
Autumn leaves observed in Centennial Park, Sydney.

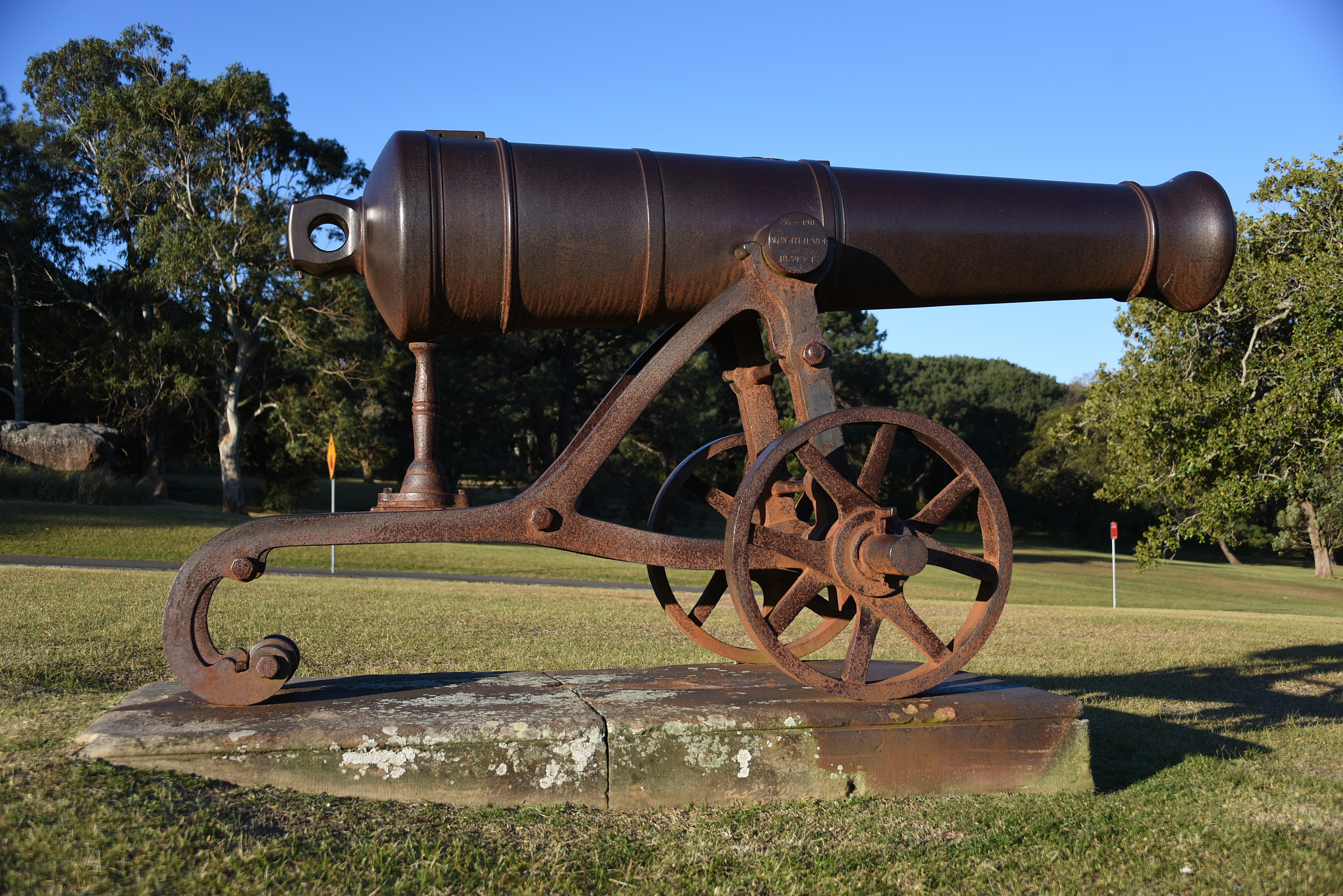
Russian cannon from the Crimean War

The government began plans for a celebratory park in 1887 and passed an Act of Parliament in the following year. Some of the grandiose plans for the area, such as a museum and a national convention building, never eventuated. Centennial Park was dedicated by Governor Lord Carrington, on Australia Day on 26 January 1888 to celebrate the first 100 years of European settlement in Australia and described by him as "emphatically the people's park". The Governor-General, Lord Hopetoun dedicated the park "to the people of New South Wales forever".

The land was originally set aside by Governor Lachlan Macquarie for grazing and watering stock. The ponds to the south, known as Lachlan Swamps, were named in his honour and were the chief water supply for Sydney from 1830 to 1880. Water was carried to Hyde Park along a tunnel called Busby's Bore, after its designer John Busby (1765–1857). The tunnel served the needs of Sydney until the Nepean scheme made it redundant in the 1880s.

=== Federation Pavilion ===
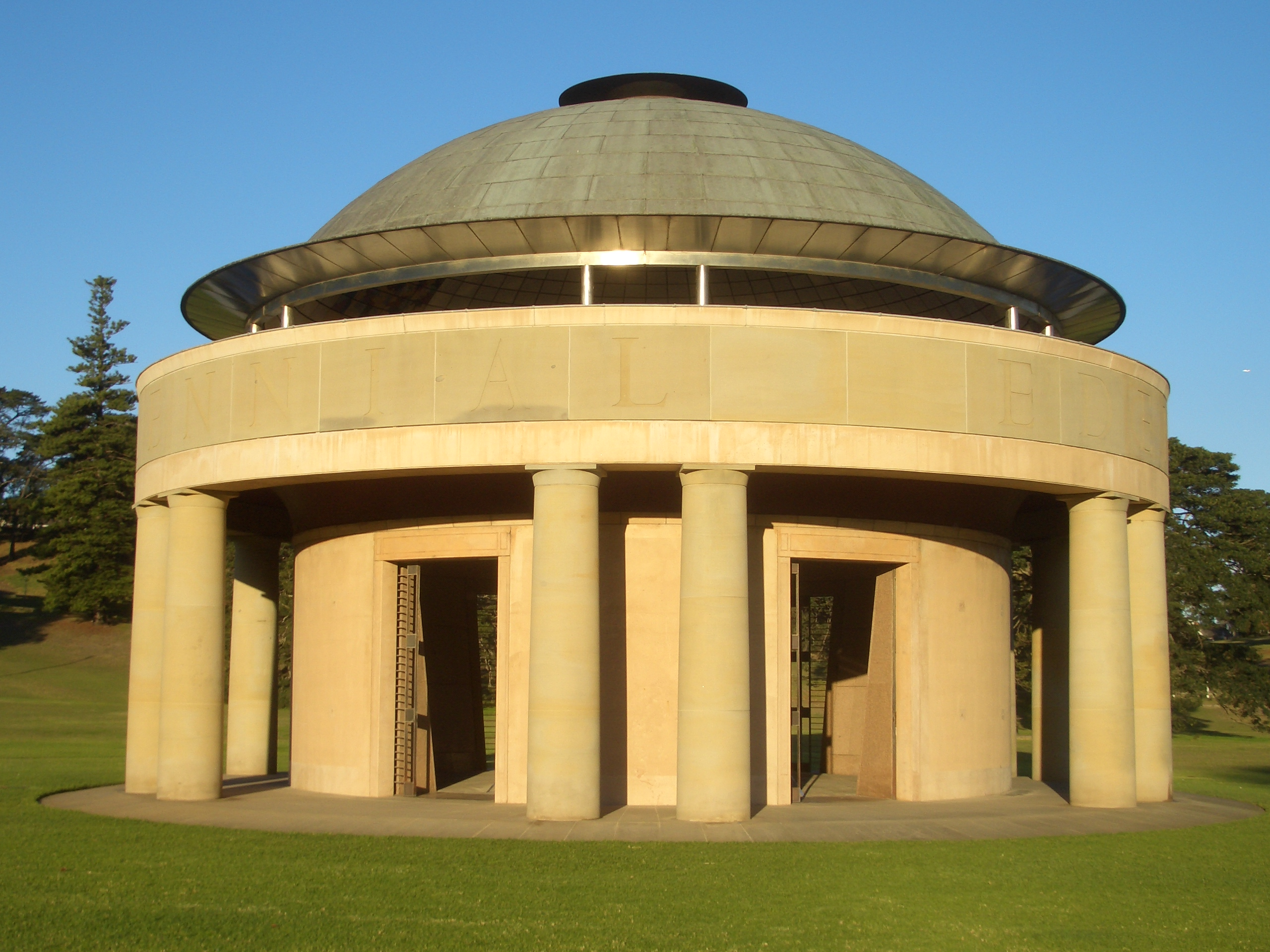
Federation Pavilion

The Federation Pavilion, which encloses the Commonwealth Stone (1901), is significant as the site of the official ceremony to mark the Federation of Australia and the inauguration of the Commonwealth of Australia on 1 January 1901.

The Federation Pavilion, designed by Alexander Tzannes, was erected around the "Commonwealth Stone" as a permanent monument to Federation, in the Bicentennial Year of European Settlement in 1988. An inscription around the pavilion is from a poem by Bernard O'Dowd, and reads: "Mammon or millennial Eden". The building was renovated and plaques were added to celebrate the Centenary of the Federation of Australia on 1 January 2001.

The Commonwealth Stone is made of sandstone, and it is almost the only remnant of the original pavilion used by Lord Hopetoun. Most of the structure rotted, being made of plaster of Paris; the base survived and is now located in Cabarita Park. Its remains are heritage-listed under the name "Federation Pavilion".

=== Grand Drive ===
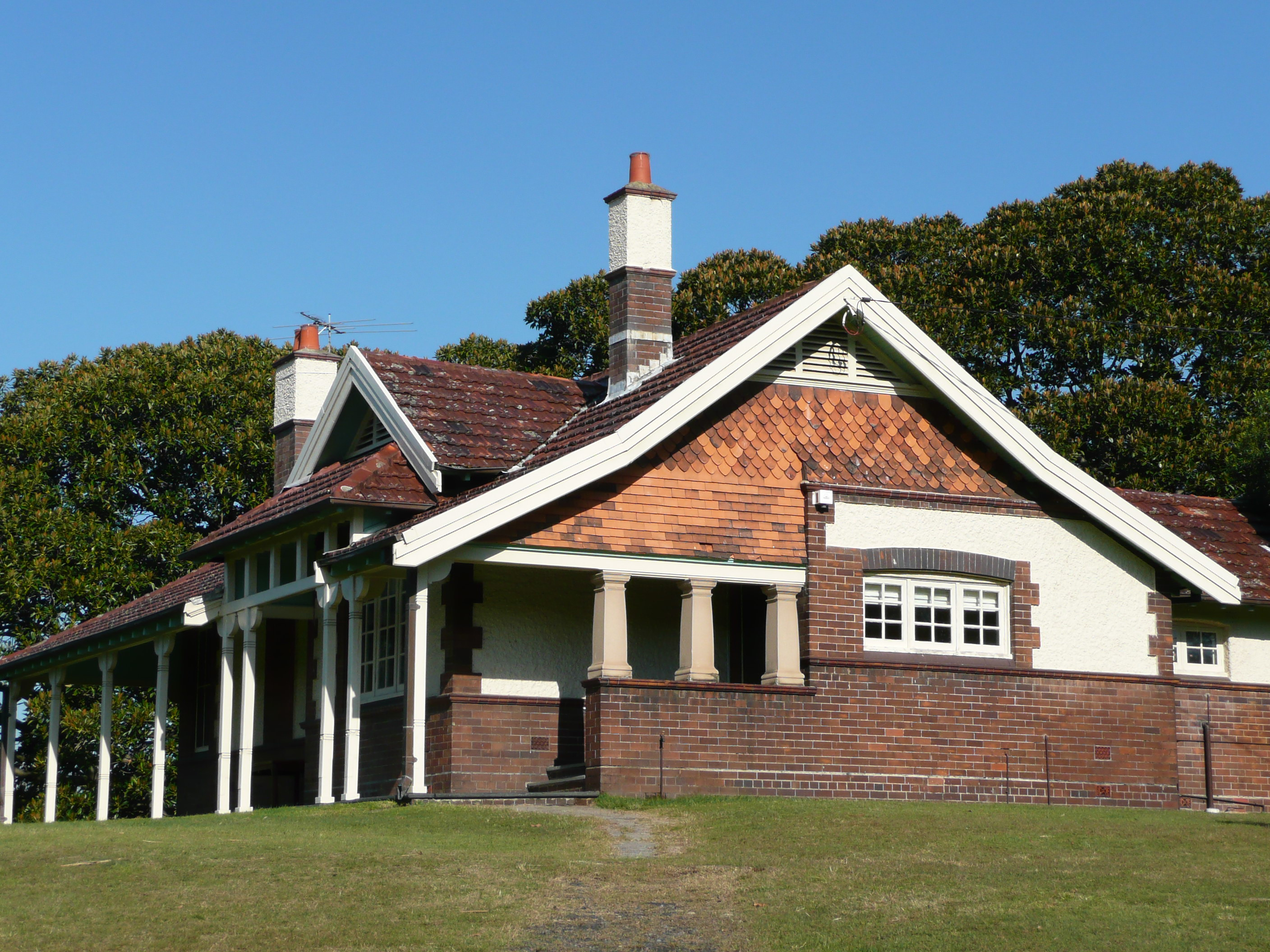
Ranger's cottage designed by Walter Liberty Vernon

Grand Drive is the circular main road through the park. It runs for 3.8 kilometres (2.4 mi) and was part of the marathons course used in the Sydney 2000 Olympic and Sydney 2000 Paralympic Games. The drive is separated into five concentric circles, with the outer track used for cycling or rollerblading, fourth largest for car driving, third for car parking and many trees, the second is a paved pathway for walking, also used for running, the smallest being a dirt track for horseriding.

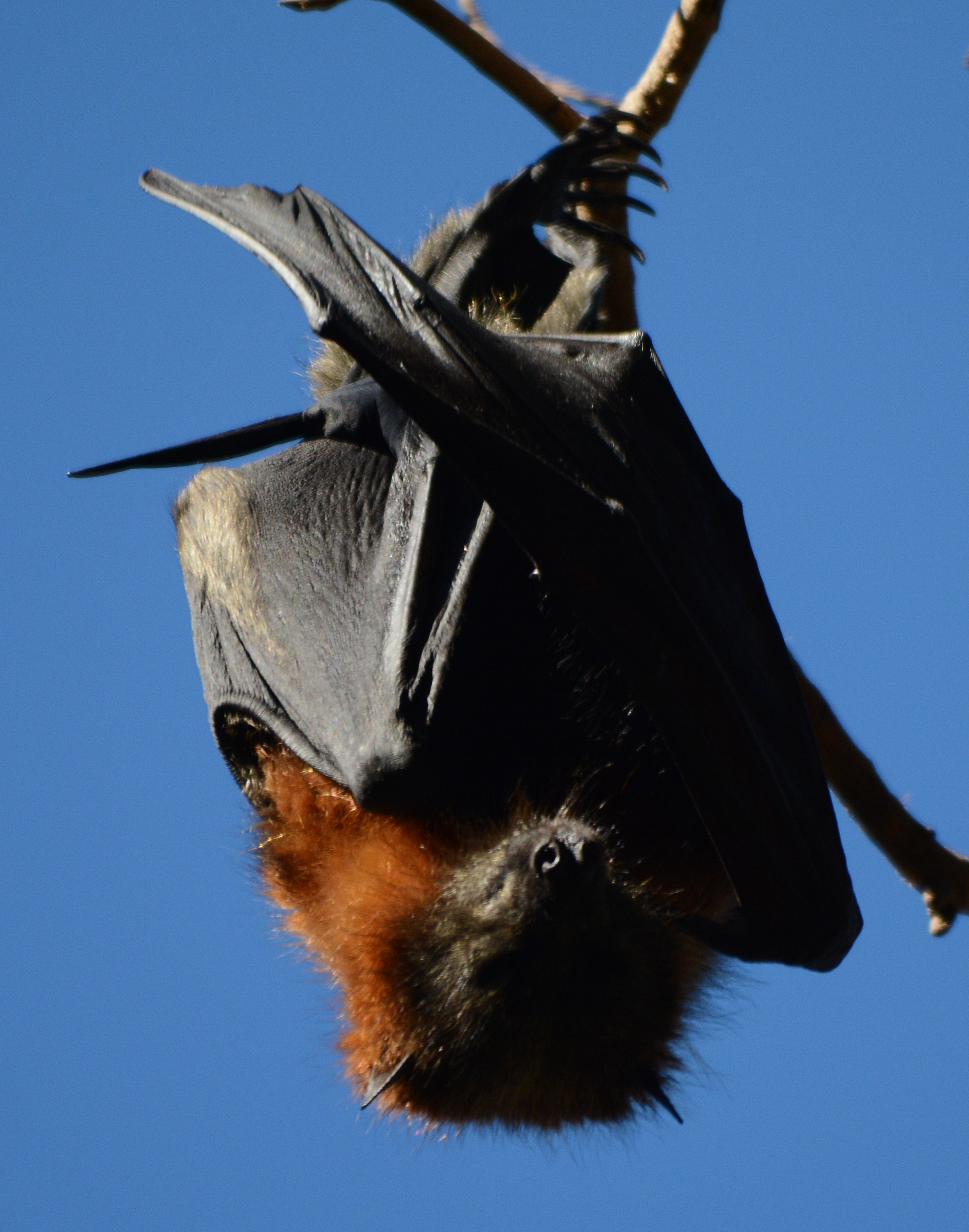
Flying fox in Lachlan Swamp

=== Wildlife ===
Centennial Park has a wide variety of wildlife that makes its home in the park or uses it frequently. The range includes pelicans, black swans, mallard ducks, White ducks, purple swamphens, Common moorhens, coots, Toulouse geese, Emden geese, turtles and eels, plus European carp that were introduced into the park's ponds and are now regarded as a pest. There is also a colony of flying foxes in the Lachlan Swamp (including the grey-headed flying fox), which began roosting there in 2010.

== Moore Park ==
Moore Park
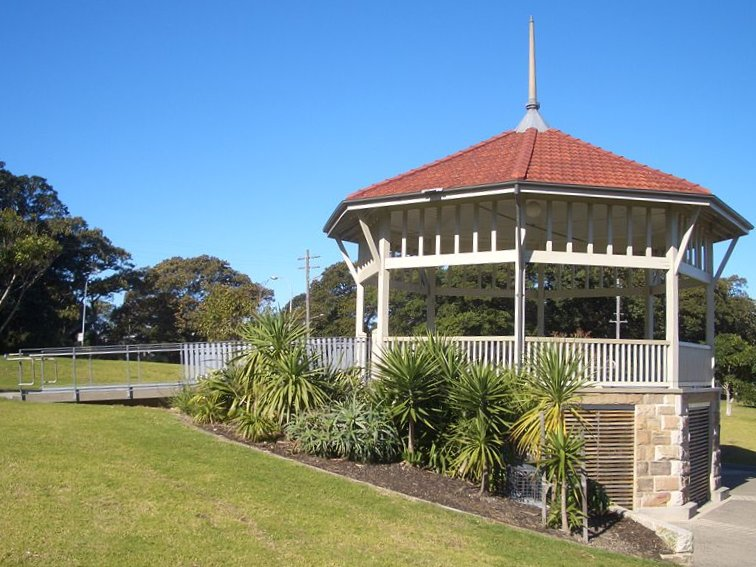
- The rotunda at Moore Park (west)
- Interactive map of Moore Park
- Type: Urban park
- Location: Sydney, New South Wales, Australia
- Coordinates: 33°53′48″S 151°13′12″E
- Area: 115 hectares (280 acres)
- Created: 1869
- Status: Open all year
- Designation: New South Wales Heritage Register

Moore Park is a large urban park comprising 115 hectares (280 acres) of open spaces and playing fields, including the ES Marks Athletics Field, an 18-hole public golf course and golf driving range, tennis courts and netball courts. The park is also used as a venue for circuses and other outdoor events. The adjoining Sydney Football and Sydney Cricket stadia are managed by the Sydney Cricket & Sports Ground Trust.

The 440-metre-long (1,440 ft) Albert Cotter Bridge with concrete helical approach ramps across Anzac Parade connects Moore Park (west) with Kippax Lakes and Moore Park (east). A section of the heritage-listed Busby's Bore is located adjacent to Kippax Lakes and run's underneath sections of Moore Park.

=== History ===
The parkland located south of Paddington was named after Charles Moore, Mayor of Sydney from 1867 to 1869, who fought for the land to be dedicated as a leisure area for the people of Sydney and suburbs. The land was part of 400 hectares (1,000 acres) originally set aside by Governor Lachlan Macquarie in 1810 for grazing and watering stock.

Sydney's first zoo was established here in 1879 on 2.8 hectares (7 acres) of land known as Billygoat Swamp. The zoological gardens covered 6.1 hectares (15 acres) by 1906 but moved to Bradley's Head at the site now known as Taronga Zoo in 1917. It was replaced by Sydney Girls High School, which opened on this site in 1921. Students were transferred from Elizabeth Street, which was the site of a David Jones department store. Sydney Boys High School opened in 1928 on the remaining zoo land.

An infamous pack rape crime occurred in the park, leading to the 1886 Mount Rennie rape case. Nine men were sentenced to death and four were hanged despite controversy. Location on the rise known as Mount Rennie is the heritage-listed Moore Park Golf House that was opened on 19 June 1926. The Golf House is a two-storey brick building with tiled roof and features a restaurant and bar with views of the golf course and a 150-seat function centre with views towards the city.

Constructed in 1909 in the park's northwestern corner is a rotunda, designed by the New South Wales Government Architect, that fell into disrepair by 1929 and was restored in 2004. A sandstone dwelling constructed in 1860 on the corner of Anzac Parade and Alison Road served as a road toll house up until 1877 and is the only surviving metropolitan toll house and the only two-storey toll house. Road tolls were collected from travellers journeying between Sydney and La Perouse or Randwick Racecourse.

== Queen's Park ==
Queen's Park
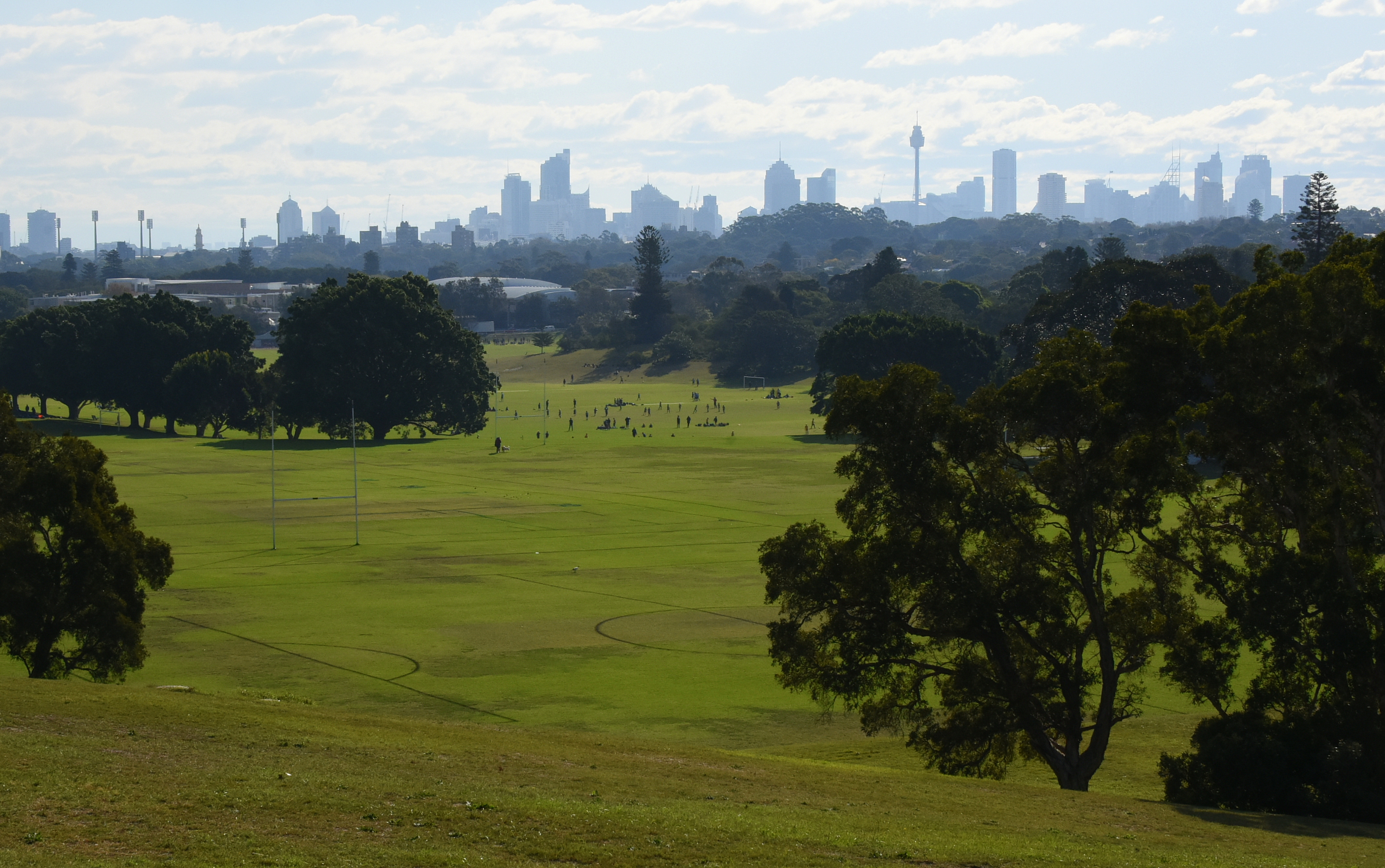
- Interactive map of Queen's Park
- Type: Urban park
- Location: Sydney, New South Wales, Australia
- Coordinates: 33°54′04″S 151°14′53″E
- Area: 26 hectares (64 acres)
- Created: 1888
- Status: Open all year

Queen's Park is a 26-hectare (64-acre) urban park set in a natural amphitheatre at the foot of dramatic sandstone cliffs, with panoramic views, that forms part of the Centennial Parklands. It was dedicated with Centennial Park in 1888 as part of the centenary celebrations of European settlement in Australia through the enactment of the Centennial Celebrations Act 1887. Surrounded to the north by the suburb of Queens Park, the park was originally part of the Sydney Common and later the Lachlan Swamps Water Reserve. Numerous playing fields are located on the southern and western flatter sections of the park. It has been used for sports fields since 1938. Moriah College, which is located on the park's western boundary, also uses the park for their PDHPE lessons and other schools in Sydney also use the park. The Centennial Park and Moore Park Trust undertook major renovations of Queen's Park in 2009 to improve the quality of the playing fields which are used daily. The Trust also completed a major renovation of the popular children's playground in 2009, and developed a shared cycleway to link the eastern suburbs cycle network with Centennial Park.

== Heritage listing ==
As at 25 September 2008, Centennial Parklands is a place of National, State and Local heritage significance. It is a large, linked open space of largely nineteenth-century landscape design intended for social and physical activity.

The Parklands has developed at the head of the Botany Bay catchment in an area originally part of the territory of the Gadi people on lands designated in 1811 as the Sydney Common. The Parklands retains evidence of the original landforms and plays a vital role in sustaining natural processes and biological diversity on a scale that is rare in the inner urban environment.

The Parklands has national significance as the place of the inauguration of the nation, the creation of a People's Park, events, persons and monuments of national importance. The place also has strong associations with convict heritage, pathways and transportation routes, water supply, horticultural and agricultural experimentation, nature conservation, military use, and a diversity of sport, recreation and cultures.

=== Summary of Natural Heritage ===
Centennial Parklands retains rare evidence of the original geodiversity, biodiversity, and ecosystems of the area known today as the eastern suburbs of Sydney. The natural basin in which the Parklands is situated retains its hydrological and ecological function as the head of the Botany Bay catchment. The waterbodies and vegetation in the Parklands continue to provide rare habitat for a wide diversity of indigenous flora and fauna within a highly urbanised area. The Parklands provides habitat for rare and threatened species and contains remnants of an endangered ecological community, Eastern Suburbs Banksia Scrub, which covered much of the area prior to European contact. The natural significance of the Parklands underpins its value to current and future generations and to the regional environment.

=== Summary of Indigenous Heritage ===
Today's Parklands forms a part of a complex of Indigenous places used as a natural resource for social, ceremonial and subsistence purposes in the pre-colonial and post-contact periods. The traditional Gadigal cultural landscape included a detailed knowledge of the land and resources of today's Parklands, which allowed the Gadi people as custodians to manage them and look after them properly.

The springs, wetlands and remnant vegetation that can still be found in the Parklands today continue to represent an important biological resource which would have been a useful source of fresh water, plants and animals through the generations. It is therefore probable that the Gadi people used the area for camping, food collecting and other activities in the pre-colonial period. Known associations during the post-contact era include camping and food collecting visits, employment, military activities, sport, cultural events and leisure.

The maintenance of ongoing spiritual and other associations with Country continues to be important to Indigenous Australians who wish to care for this place as a cultural landscape.

=== Summary of Cultural Heritage ===
Centennial Parklands is highly valued for its space, scale, beauty and grandeur and for the rarity and diversity of its Natural, Indigenous and Cultural heritage. For many individuals, groups and the community as a whole, Centennial Parklands is a cultural landscape that continues to play an important and vital role in personal and social histories.

The place retains significant associations with the development of the early colony of NSW, the establishment and design of parks and gardens for the public good, and prominent events. These include the Centenary and Bicentenary of the establishment of the NSW colony, inauguration of the Commonwealth of Australia in 1901, the 2000 Olympic Games, the Paralympics and the Centenary of Federation celebrations in 2001.

Centennial Parklands is highly significant for its leisure and sporting heritage. The individual parks that make up the Parklands were specifically established to cater for public recreation and have been an important social and recreational resource for over a century.

Centennial Parklands now receives millions of visits annually, attracting people from surrounding residential areas, the wider Sydney region and beyond. The Parklands provides a unique area of open space that supports a diversity of activities that are rare in an inner urban area.

Centennial Park, Moore Park, Queens Park was listed on the New South Wales State Heritage Register on 27 March 2000 having satisfied the following criteria.

The place is important in demonstrating the course, or pattern, of cultural or natural history in New South Wales.

Centennial Park is historically significant as part of the site of the second Sydney Common and public open space proclaimed by Governor Lachlan Macquarie on 5 October 1811. It is the site of Sydney's second and third water supply, Busby Bore and the Lachlan Water Reserve. It is the site of Sydney's first public suburban drive - the Grand Drive. It is the first designed suburban park, based on the English model of integrated suburban residential development and recreational open space. The Park provided the setting for the following prominent events: The Centenary Celebrations, 1888; The Annual Military Review; the Commonwealth Swearing-in Ceremony 1901; the American Fleet Review 1908; mourning for the death of King Edward 1910; Peace Celebrations and Thanksgiving Service 1918; Sesqui-Centenary Celebrations 1938; Federation Jubilee 1951; Federation Pavilion dedication 1988; Bi-Centenary Celebrations 1988. The most significant periods in the history of the park are: pre-European, natural environment pre-1788; Lachlan Water Reserve 1811–1887; Centennial Park 1888–1930, 1984–present [1990].

The place is important in demonstrating aesthetic characteristics and/or a high degree of creative or technical achievement in New South Wales.

Centennial Park is a designed environment that, after 100 years, still retains the unity and continuity of its designed elements. Aesthetically it combines contrasting landscape types with spatial diversity that, together with a surrounding built environment that complements the scale of the Park while providing minimal visual intrusion, works together to provide a harmony of scale.

The place has a strong or special association with a particular community or cultural group in New South Wales for social, cultural or spiritual reasons.

Centennial park, designed as a People's Park, has provided an important social venue for meetings of a range of community groups, commemorative events, sporting events, military venues, concerts and general public recreation.

The place has potential to yield information that will contribute to an understanding of the cultural or natural history of New South Wales.

Centennial Park has been the site of horticultural experimentation, particularly with grass species and native tree species. It has also been the site of conservation of indigenous bird species and is the location of indigenous plant species representative of the ecology of the Botany sands system.

== See also ==
- Centennial Park, the suburb
- Disney Studios Australia
- Queens Park, the suburb
- Moore Park, the suburb
- Sydney Cricket Ground
- Sydney Football Stadium
- Sydney Showground (Moore Park)
- The Entertainment Quarter
- List of parks in Sydney
