= Centennial Park (Sydney) =

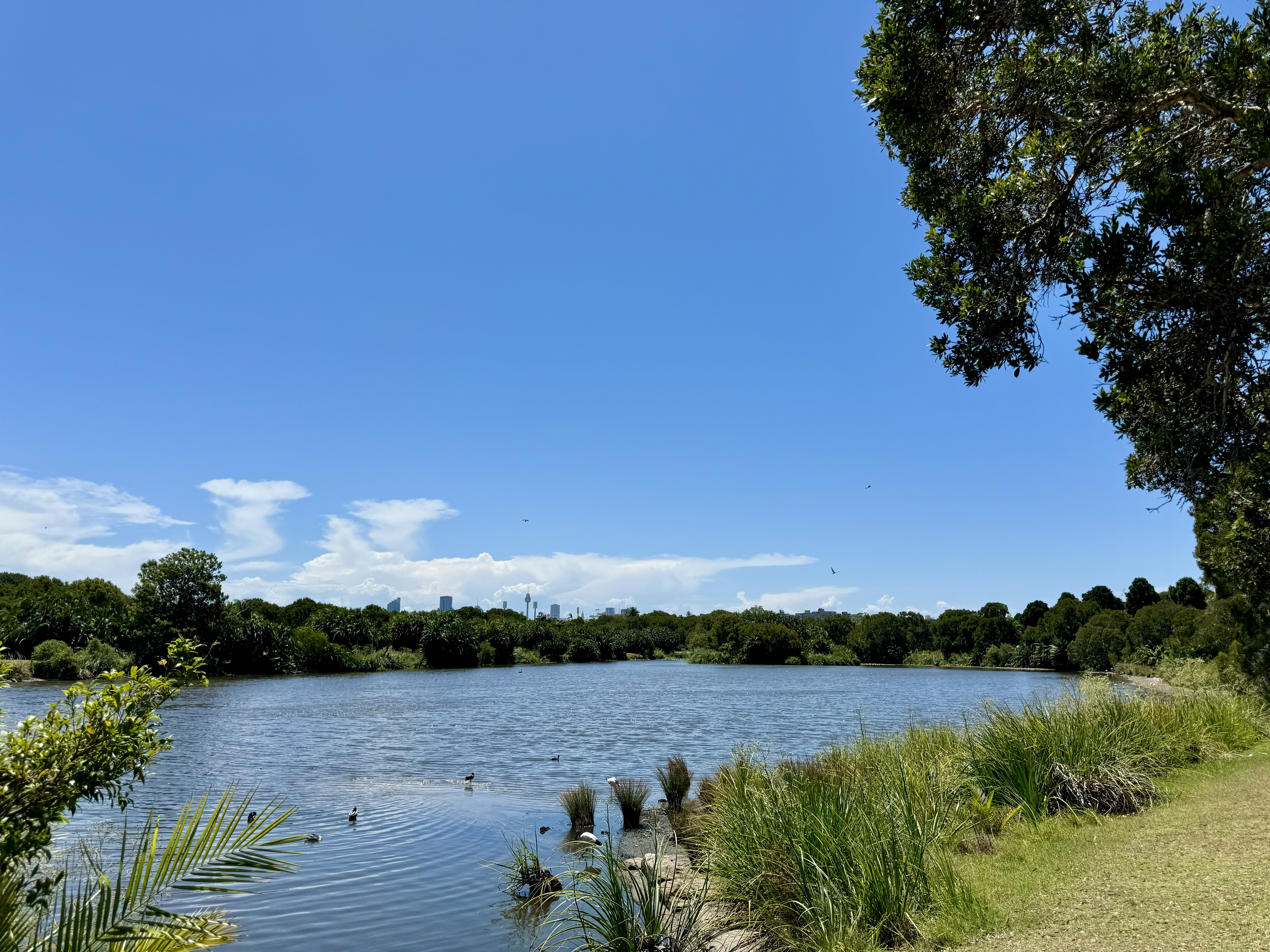
- Randwick Pond

- Location of Centennial Park in Sydney
- Type: Urban park
- Location: Sydney, New South Wales, Australia
- Coordinates: 33°54′S 151°14′E
- Created: 1888; 138 years ago
- Founder: Premier Henry Parkes
- Operator: Centennial Park & Moore Park Trust; Part of Greater Sydney Parklands
- Status: Open all year
- Designation: Australian National Heritage List
- Public transit: :: Bondi Junction; : Routes #333, 340, 352, 355, 389 and 440; : Moore Park and Royal Randwick
- Website: www.centennialparklands.com.au
- Location: City of Randwick, New South Wales, Australia

Australian National Heritage List
- Official name: Centennial Park
- Type: Listed place
- Designated: 3 October 2018
- Reference no.: 106153

Centennial Park is an urban park in Sydney, New South Wales, Australia. The park is the largest of the three parks making up the Centennial Parklands area in the City of Randwick.

Following the closure of the Lachlan Swamps, as a source of drinking water due to pollution, Governor Carington lobbied for the creation of a landscaped park for the people of Sydney. The Centennial Celebrations Act of 1887 created the park, which was dedicated by Governor Carington on Australia Day, 26 January 1888 to celebrate the first 100 years of European settlement in Australia.

The park comprises 2.2 square kilometres (0.85 sq mi) of open space, including wooded grounds, gardens, wetlands, sports fields and a wide avenue with cycling and pedestrian tracks.

The park is open from 6:30am to 5:30pm during the winter months, 6am to 6pm in spring and 6am to 8pm in summer.

== History ==
Centennial Park, alongside Moore Park and Queens Park, were originally a part of Sydney Common, land set aside by Governor Lachlan Macquarie in 1811 for use as a water reserve and common grazing land. The ponds to the south, known as Lachlan Swamps, were named in his honour and were the chief water supply for Sydney from 1830 to 1880. Water was carried to Hyde Park along a tunnel called Busby's Bore, after its designer John Busby (1765–1857). The tunnel served the needs of Sydney until the Nepean scheme made it redundant in the 1880s.

The government began plans for a celebratory park in 1887 and passed an Act of Parliament in the following year. Some of the grandiose plans for the area, such as a museum and a national convention building, never eventuated.

Centennial Park was dedicated by Governor Carrington on Australia Day, 26 January 1888 to celebrate the first 100 years of European settlement in Australia and described by him as "emphatically the people's park". The Governor-General, Lord Hopetoun dedicated the park "to the people of New South Wales forever".

In 1851, it was a scene of a duel between the first Premier of New South Wales, Stuart Donaldson, and the Surveyor-General, Thomas Mitchell. Both men survived to fulfil their duties.

On 7 February 1986, Sallie-Anne Huckstepp was found drowned in the Busby Pond. It was thought that she had been murdered by a well-known Sydney criminal, Neddy Smith, but he was not convicted. The Sydney Morning Herald described her as a "32-year-old gangster's moll, heroin addict and prostitute who mingled with Sydney's most notorious criminals and blew the whistle on crooked cops."

== Park Features ==
=== Grand Drive ===
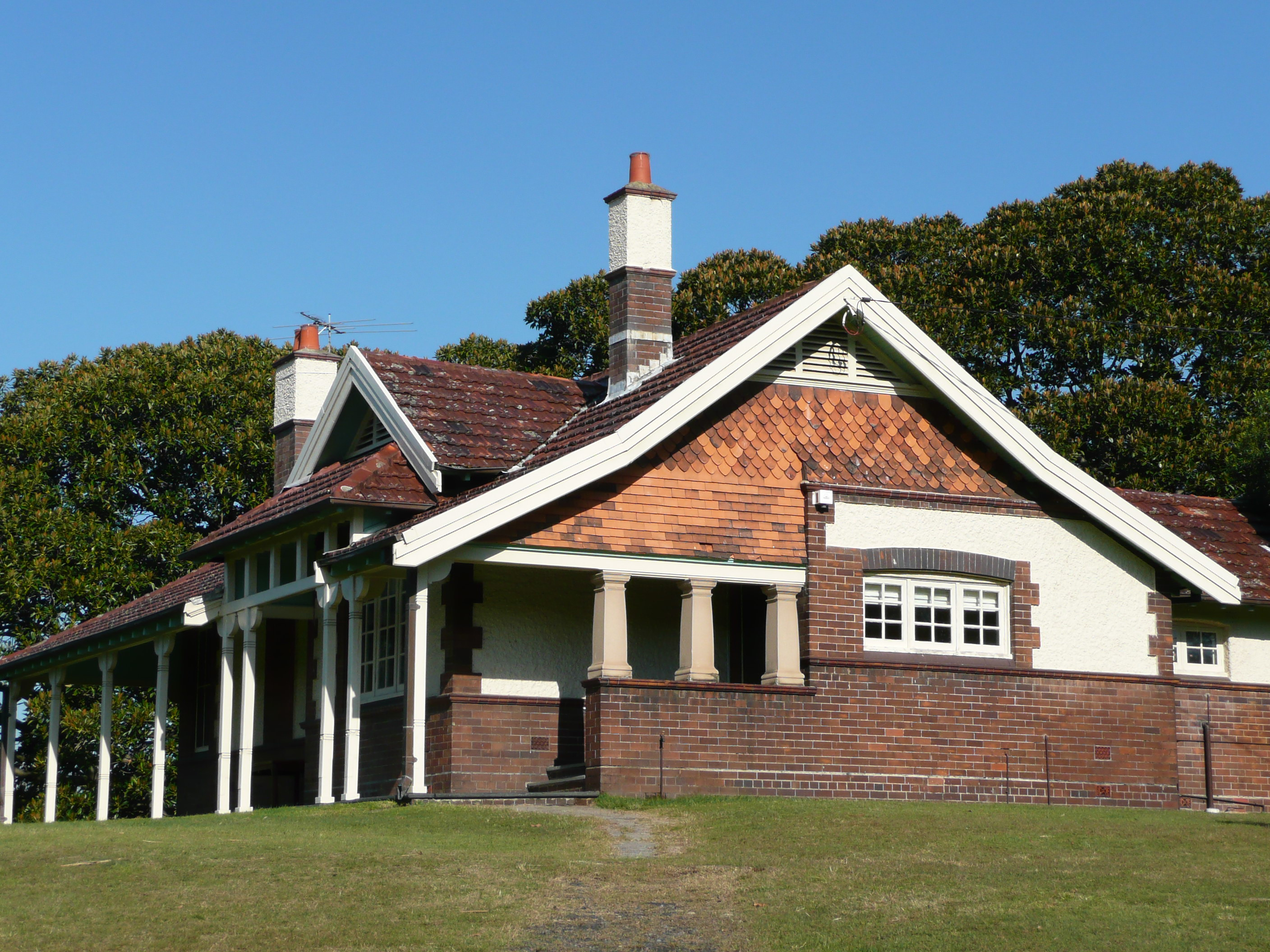
Ranger's cottage designed by Walter Liberty Vernon

Grand Drive is the circular main road through the park. It runs for 3.8 kilometres (2.4 mi) and was part of the marathons course used in the Sydney 2000 Olympic and Sydney 2000 Paralympic Games. The drive is separated into five concentric circles, with the outer track used for cycling or rollerblading, fourth largest for car driving, third for car parking and many trees, the second is a paved pathway for walking, also used for running, the smallest being a dirt track for horseriding.

In March 2012, Centennial Parklands management issued a proposal for traffic calming measures at one of four identified blackspots on Grand Drive. The proposal caused the ire of cyclist groups who staged a mass protest, claiming that the proposed measures would make the park more dangerous for cyclists and pedestrians. Public submissions into the proposal were invited for Centennial Parklands management, together with community consultative representatives, to review.

=== Federation Pavilion ===
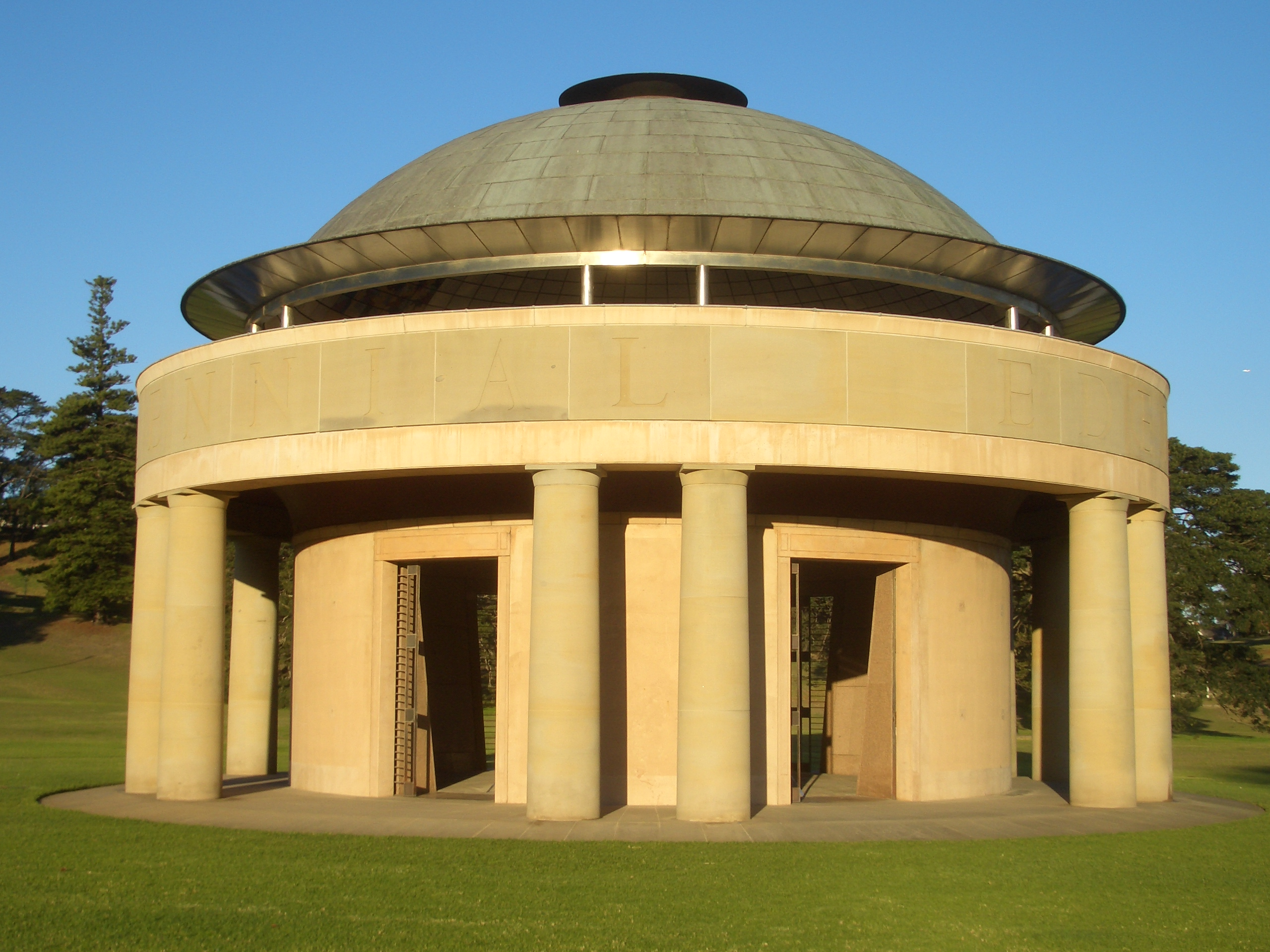
Federation Pavilion

The Federation Pavilion, which encloses the Commonwealth Stone (1901), is significant as the site of the official ceremony to mark the Federation of Australia and the inauguration of the Commonwealth of Australia on 1 January 1901.

The Federation Pavilion, designed by Alexander Tzannes, was erected around the "Commonwealth Stone" as a permanent monument to Federation, in the Bicentennial Year of European Settlement in 1988. An inscription around the pavilion is from a poem by Bernard O'Dowd, and reads: "Mammon or millennial Eden". The building was renovated and plaques were added to celebrate the Centenary of the Federation of Australia on 1 January 2001.

The Commonwealth Stone is made of sandstone, and it is almost the only remnant of the original pavilion used by Lord Hopetoun. Most of the structure rotted, being made of plaster of Paris; the base survived and is now located in Cabarita Park. Its remains are heritage-listed under the name "Federation Pavilion".

=== McKay Oval ===
Located in the most western area of the park, McKay Oval is used as the home ground of Sydney Boys High School for rugby union, soccer and cricket matches, in the Great Public Schools Competition. The main oval is currently surrounded by small white fence, which is also the boundary for cricket games, though spectators for the winter sports are allowed inside this boundary and are allowed to sit very close to the field, around 5 metres (16 ft).

Built adjacent is the Fairland Pavilion, the hosting area for various lunches and afternoon teas, also the location of the canteen, changerooms, scoreboard, first aid, and storerooms for the bulk of the sporting equipment.

=== Centennial Park Labyrinth ===
Sydney's first public stone labyrinth was officially opened on 15 September 2014. It cost more than A$500,000 and five months to build. It is an eleven circuit sandstone labyrinth, designed based on the medieval labyrinth in Chartres Cathedral, France.

=== Statues and Sculptures ===
After the opening of the park, Premier Henry Parkes instigated a program of commissioning and installing 31 statues. The majority are now lost, however remaining works include of writer Charles Dickens, Parkes, Griffins, and a pair of terracotta statues atop sandstone columns.

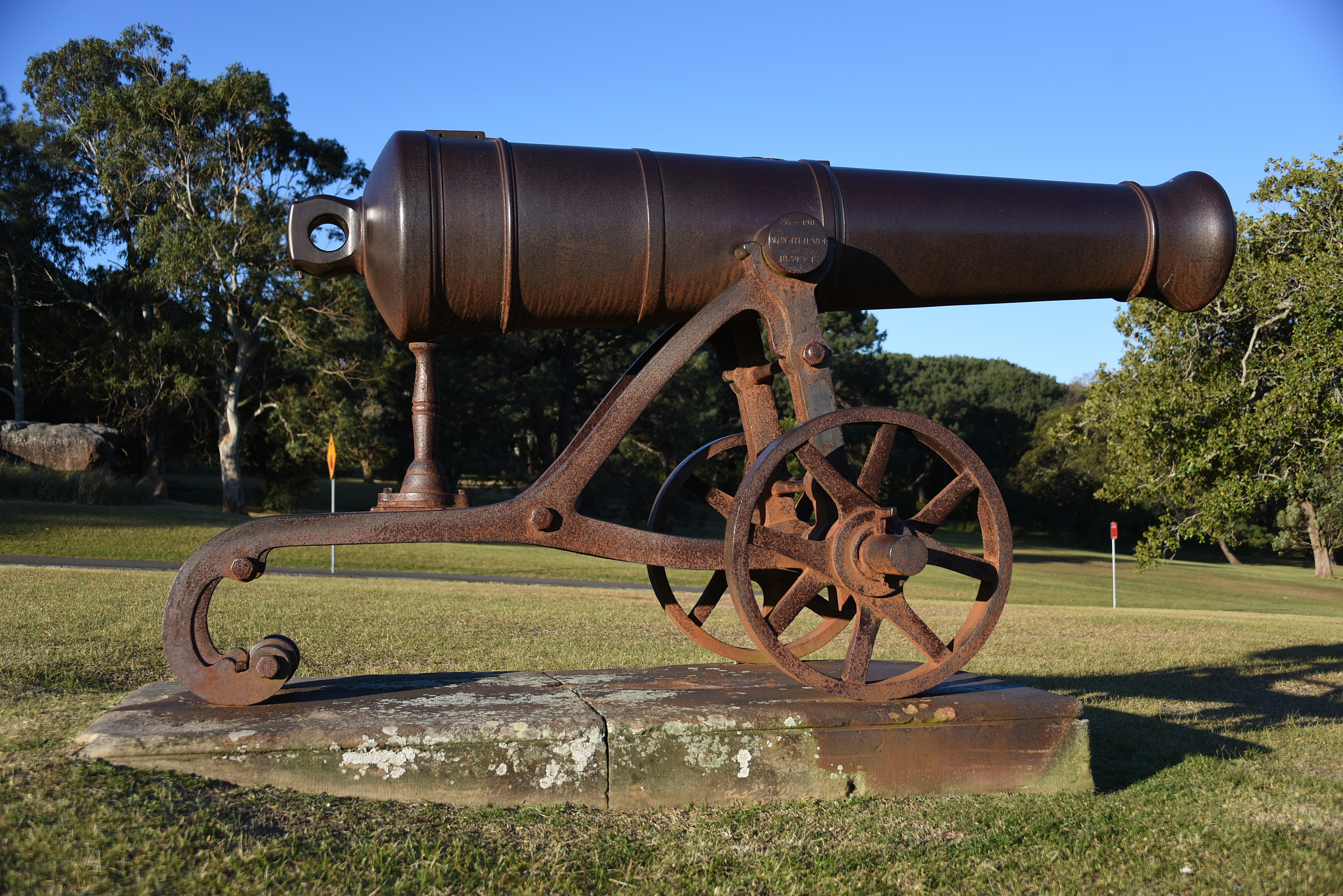
Russian cannon from the Crimean War

Near Oxford Street is a space known as Cannon Triangle, which includes a statue of a rugby union footballer called "We Won" and two cannon. The cannon were manufactured in Russia and used in the Crimean War. They were captured by British Forces after the fall of Sevastopol. A number of them were given to various cities that had made a contribution to the war effort, with the result that two of them found their way to Centennial Park. They have been in the park since 1920.

== Wildlife ==
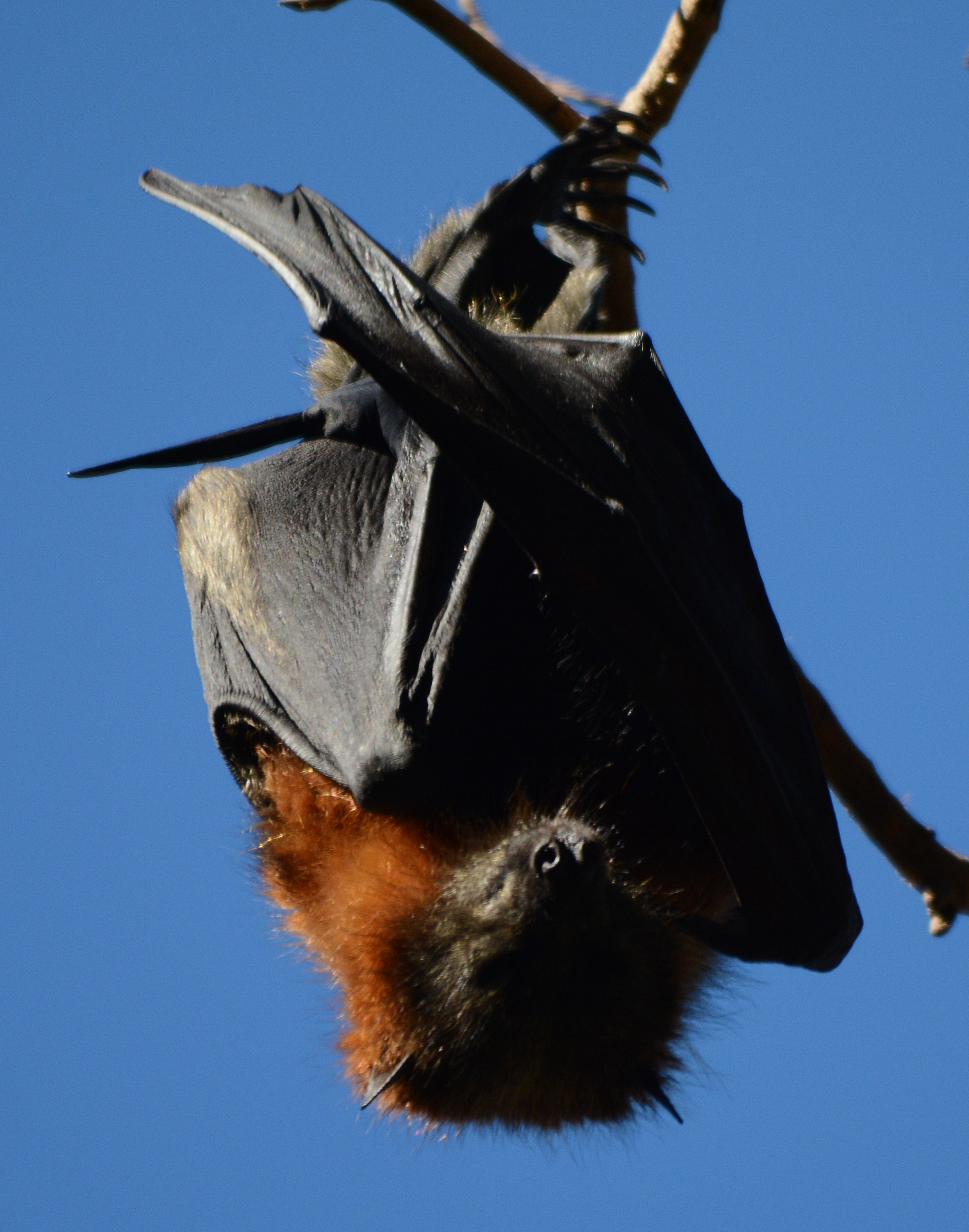
Flying fox in Lachlan Swamp

The park is a vital haven and critical habitat for wildlife in inner Sydney, being home to over 15,000 trees and over 124 species of native land and aquatic birds.

The range of wildlife includes pelicans, black swans, mallard ducks, White ducks, purple swamphens, Common moorhens, coots, Toulouse geese, Emden geese, turtles and eels, plus European carp that were introduced into the park's ponds and are now regarded as a pest.

=== Lachlan Swamp Flying Fox Colony ===
Since early 2010, large numbers (ranging from 5,000 to 45,000) of grey-headed flying foxes have been roosting in Lachlan Swamp. A small number of Black flying fox (up to ~1,000) also call the swamp home. The number is seasonal and annually variable, with ~20,000 in November 2014 and ~10,000 in November 2015.

The park is also home to a collection of microbats, with species detected within the park including Gould's wattled bat, Southern myotis, Common bent-wing bat and the East-coast Free-tailed Bat.

The Flying-Fox Camp Management Plan is in place to provide Greater Sydney Parklands with a framework to conserve the flying-foxes and their habitat.

=== Conservation Efforts ===
The park exists within the former range of the Eastern Suburbs Banksia Scrub, a critically endangered ecological area that once covered the majority of Sydney's eastern suburbs, now reduced to small, isolated patches. Large scale regeneration efforts have begun in the park, with over 20,000 native trees and shrubs being planted in 2025 as part of a broader initiative to enhance biodiversity and reconnect ecological corridors across the city.

Threatened species within the park include the flora Acacia terminalis and Magenta lilly pilly, and fauna:

- Latham's snipe
- White-bellied sea eagle
- Little bent-wing bat
- Australasian bent-wing bat
- Myotis macropus
- Powerful owl
- Grey-headed flying fox
- Freckled duck

Work is ongoing to sustain the wildlife of the park by continuing to expand patches of the Banksia Scrub, increase forage and understorey trees, and revegetate pond edges throughout the park.

== Heritage Listing ==
The park was inscribed on the Australian National Heritage List on 3 October 2018. The site was listed for its "outstanding heritage value to the nation as the site chosen for the 1901 inauguration of the Commonwealth of Australia".

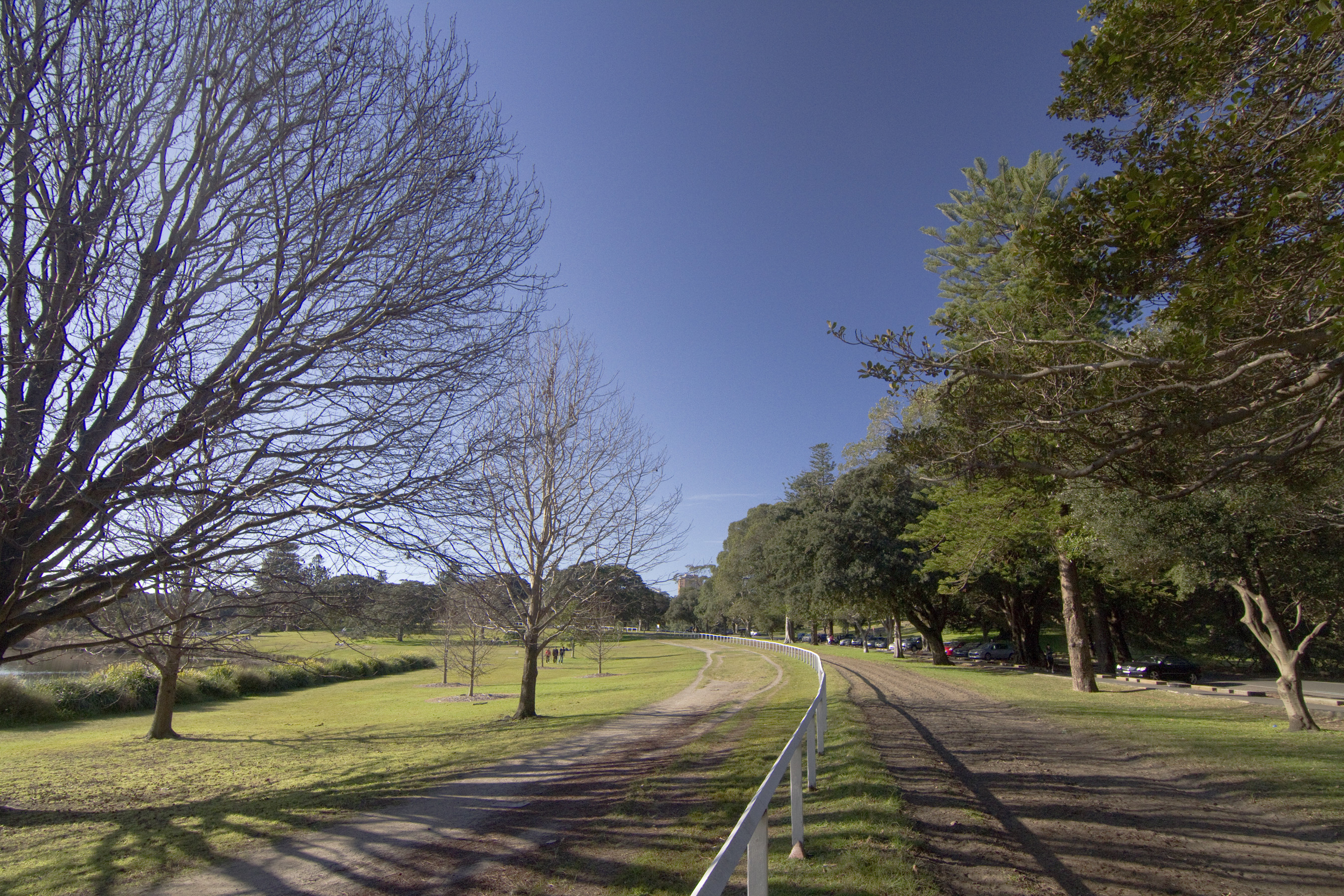
Horse track at Centennial Park

== Gallery ==
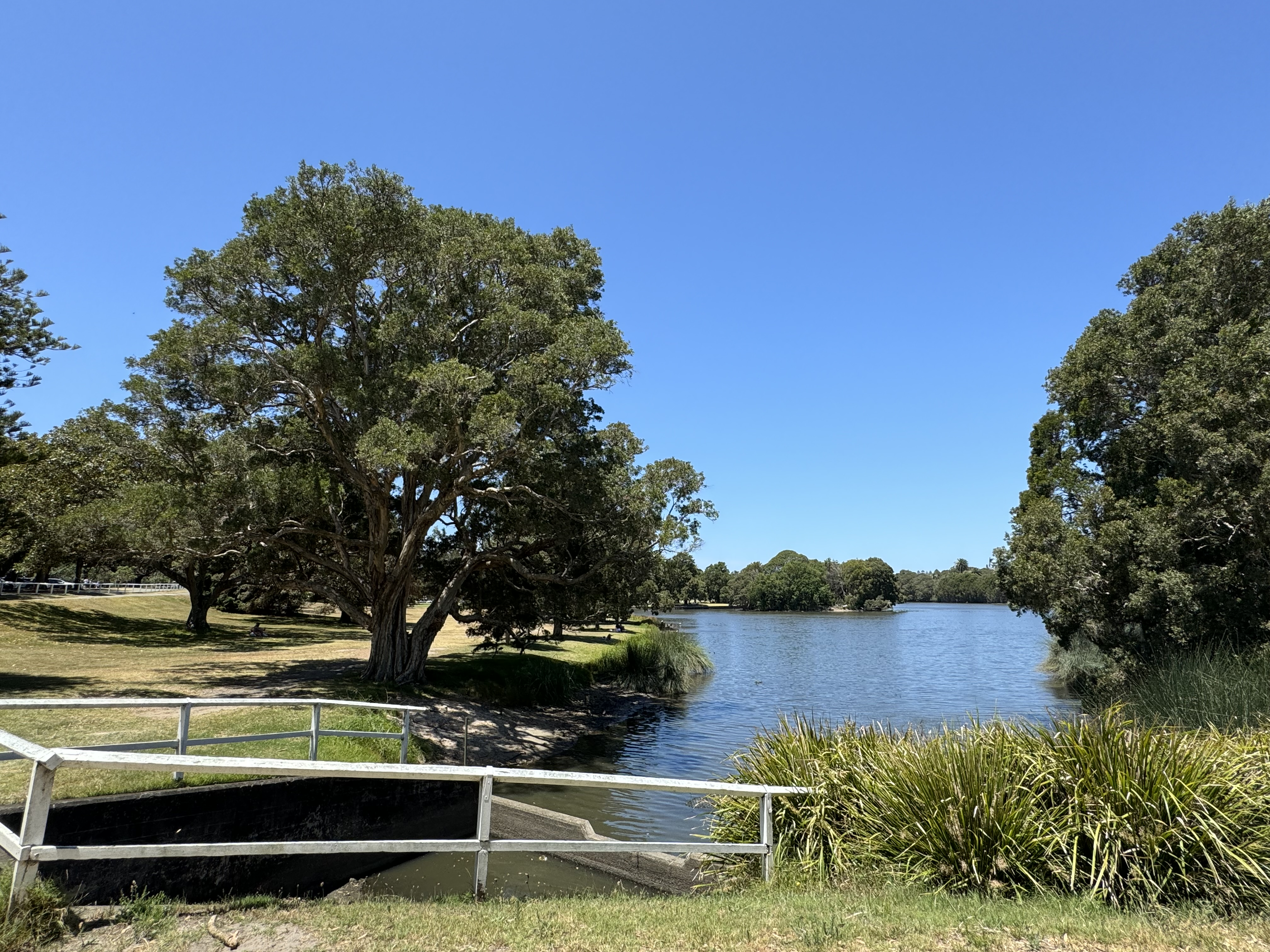
Busbys Pond

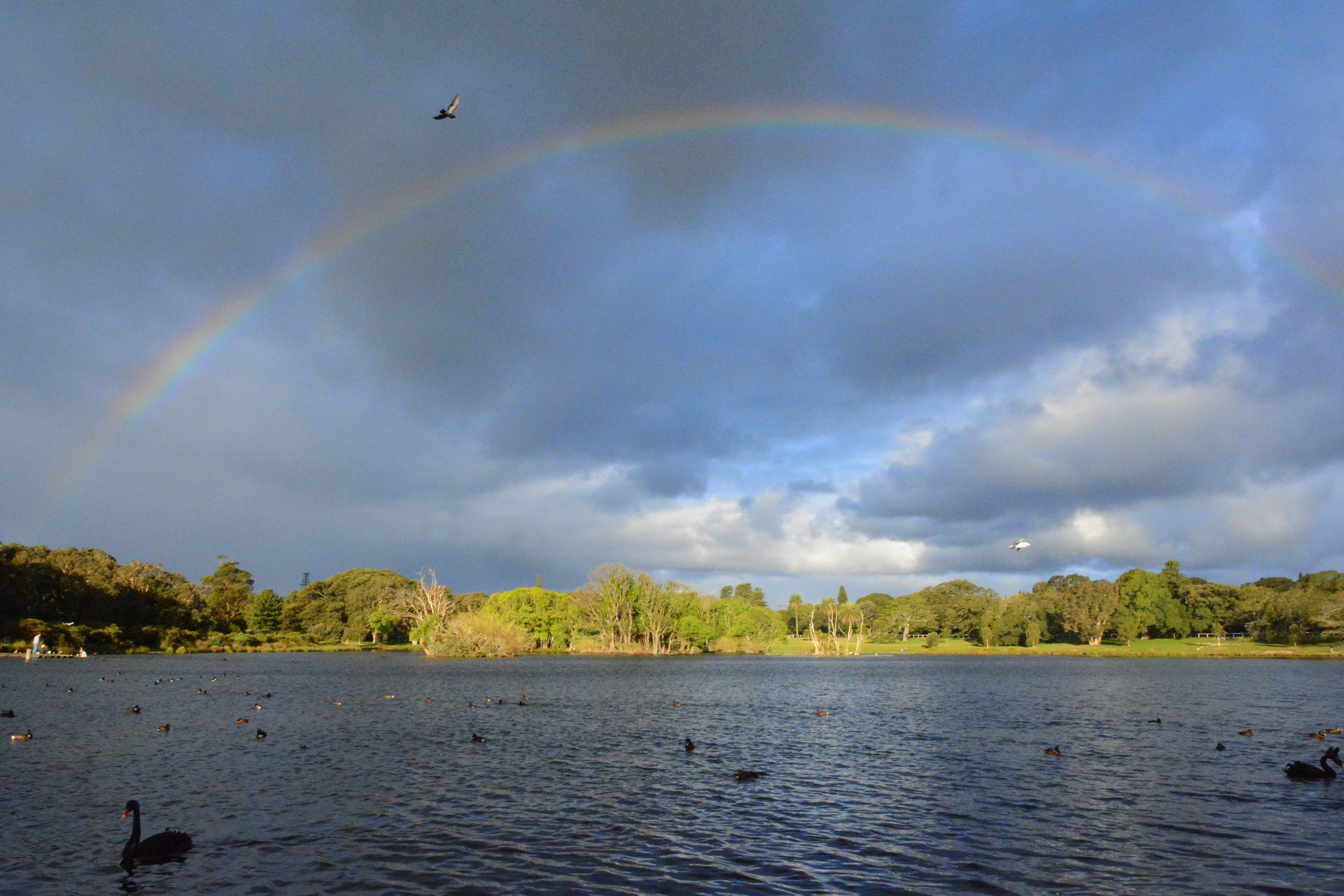
Duck Pond

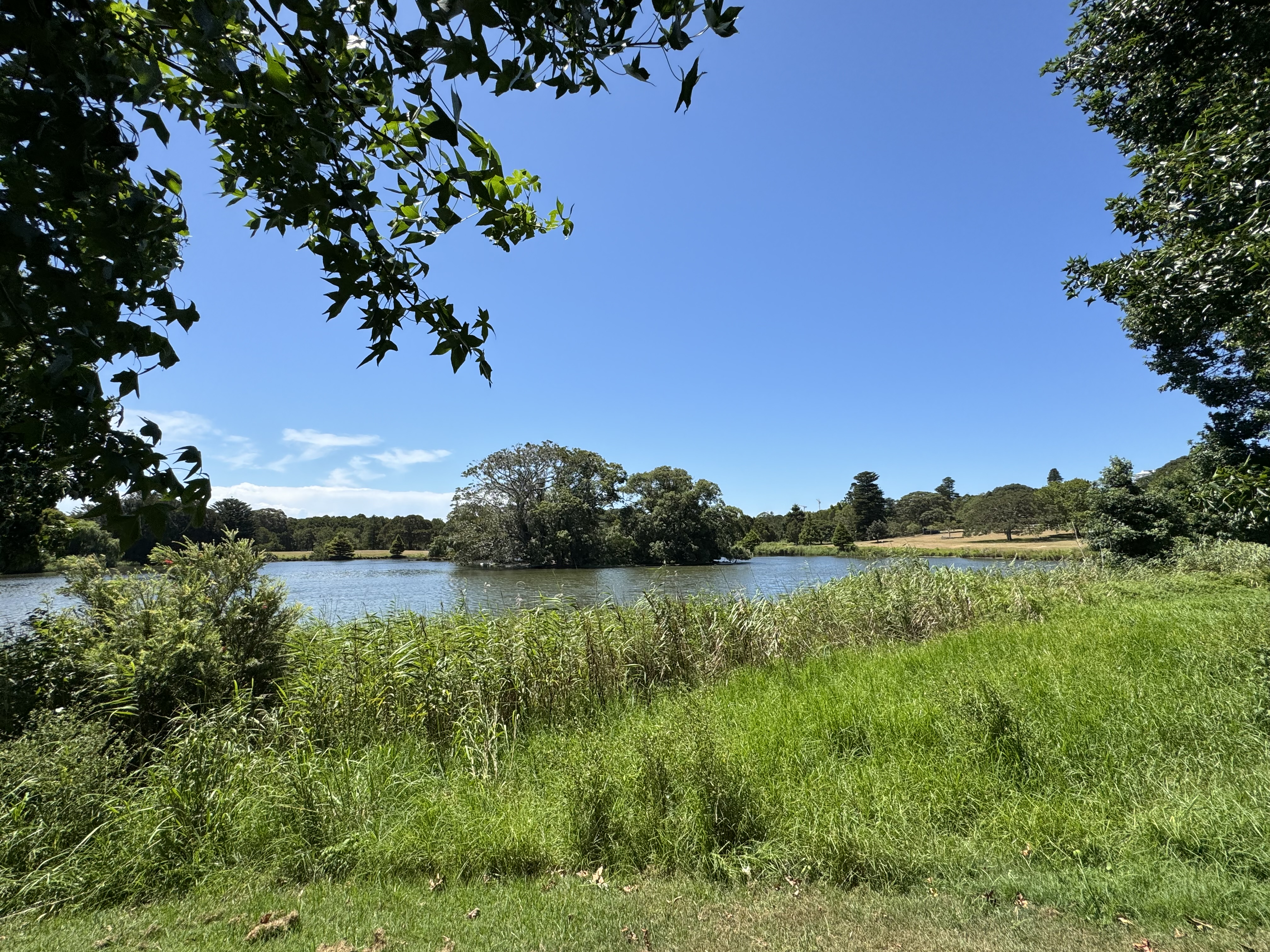
Willow Pond

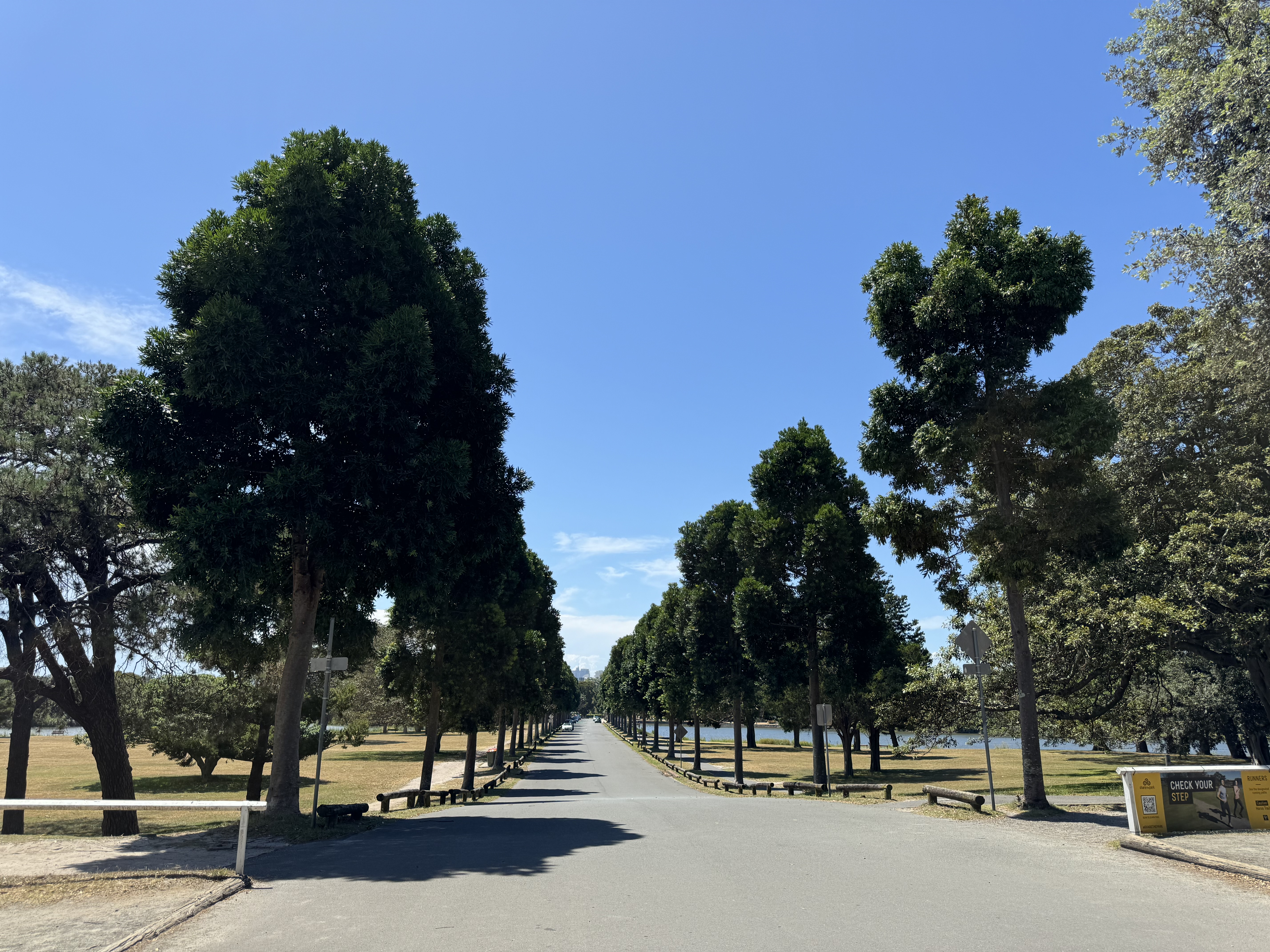
Parkes Drive

== See also ==
- Parks in Sydney
