= Federation Pavilion =

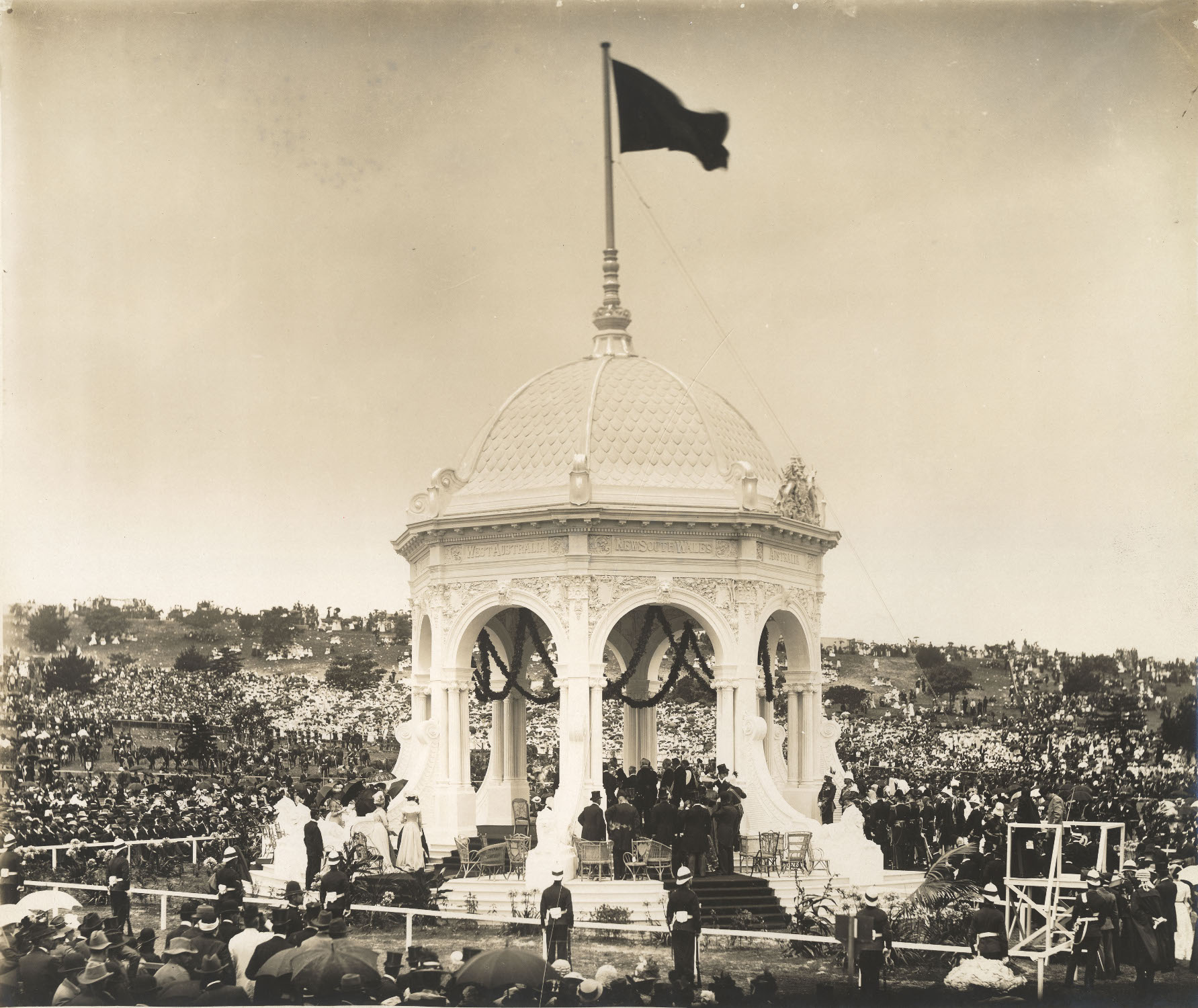
- The pavilion on 1 January 1901

- Location within New South Wales Location within Australia
- 33.8429°S 151.1179°E
- Location: Cabarita Road, Cabarita, City of Canada Bay, New South Wales, Australia

History
- Built: 1900

Site notes
- Owner: City of Canada Bay Council

New South Wales Heritage Register
- Official name: Federation Pavilion, Cabarita Park
- Type: State heritage (built)
- Designated: 22 December 2000
- Reference no.: 1454
- Type: Pavilion
- Category: Community Facilities

The Federation Pavilion was a temporary structure erected in Centennial Park, Sydney, for use in the celebrations marking the Federation of Australia on 1 January 1901. It was used to swear in Australia's first Governor-General and the first members of the Federal Executive Council, including the first Prime Minister of Australia. The pavilion was originally covered in ornate plasterwork, but the exterior was not preserved and soon fell into disrepair. In 1903, the wooden framework was purchased by the Municipality of Concord and moved to Cabarita Park in the suburb of the Cabarita. The property is now owned by the City of Canada Bay, and was added to the New South Wales State Heritage Register on 22 December 2000. The pavilion has appeared in the clear panel of the Australian five-dollar note since 2016, when the new Next Generation Banknote series went into circulation.

== History ==
=== Cabarita Park ===
At the time of European settlement the Canada Bay area was part of the traditional lands of the Wangal clan of Aboriginal people. The Wangal were a clan of the larger Darug language group or Aboriginal nation. Their lives were strongly focussed on the harbour and its foreshores, especially in food gathering. Aboriginal people also hunted animals, harvested plants and gathered raw materials in the bushland fringing the harbour. The Hen & Chicken Bay area, along with Homebush Bay, was traditionally a major meeting place for Aboriginal people from Port Jackson and the wider Sydney region. Before the arrival of white settlers, Cabarita Park was a typical rocky outcrop along the shores of the Parramatta River.

Cabarita may have been derived from an Aboriginal word meaning 'by the water' or may have been derived from a place in Spain where Surveyor-General Mitchell worked under Wellington.

Cabarita Point was first sighted by the first European settlers in February 1788 by Captain John Hunter on his journey up the Parramatta River. The park was reserved as a recreation area in 1856, and first accessible by steamer in the 1850s. Early in its history the park was popular for picnics and watching boat races on the harbour.

Part of the suburb was originally granted in 1795 to David Anderson, a private soldier in the New South Wales Corps. The grant was described as being at "Caberita Point, at the upper part of the harbour".

Cabarita Park, a picnic area on Cabarita Point was known as Correy's Gardens in the 1880s. This part of the river was the venue for early regattas, including the GPS schools "Head of the River" before these races were moved to the Nepean River. The park was dedicated for public use in 1880. Cabarita was linked to Burwood station by tram, and the park was popular with families for picnics.

There was a segregated swimming pool, with one half for men and boys, the other for women and girls. Husbands and wives, as well as lovers, would lean on the dividing fence for a chat as the water swirled around their legs. France Bay, Exile Bay and Canada Bay, adjacent to the park, commemorate a group of 58 French-Canadian exiles. After an 1838 rebellion in Canada these prisoners were sent to NSW and held in the Longbottom Stockade in Concord, at which time the 3 bays received these names.

Most of the trees now in Cabarita Park were planted in the 1930s and 1940s as during the 1920s a significant number of original trees died and were used by residents for firewood.

Cabarita Park was proclaimed a public park on 24 April 1936 under the Public Parks Act 1912.

=== Federation Pavilion ===
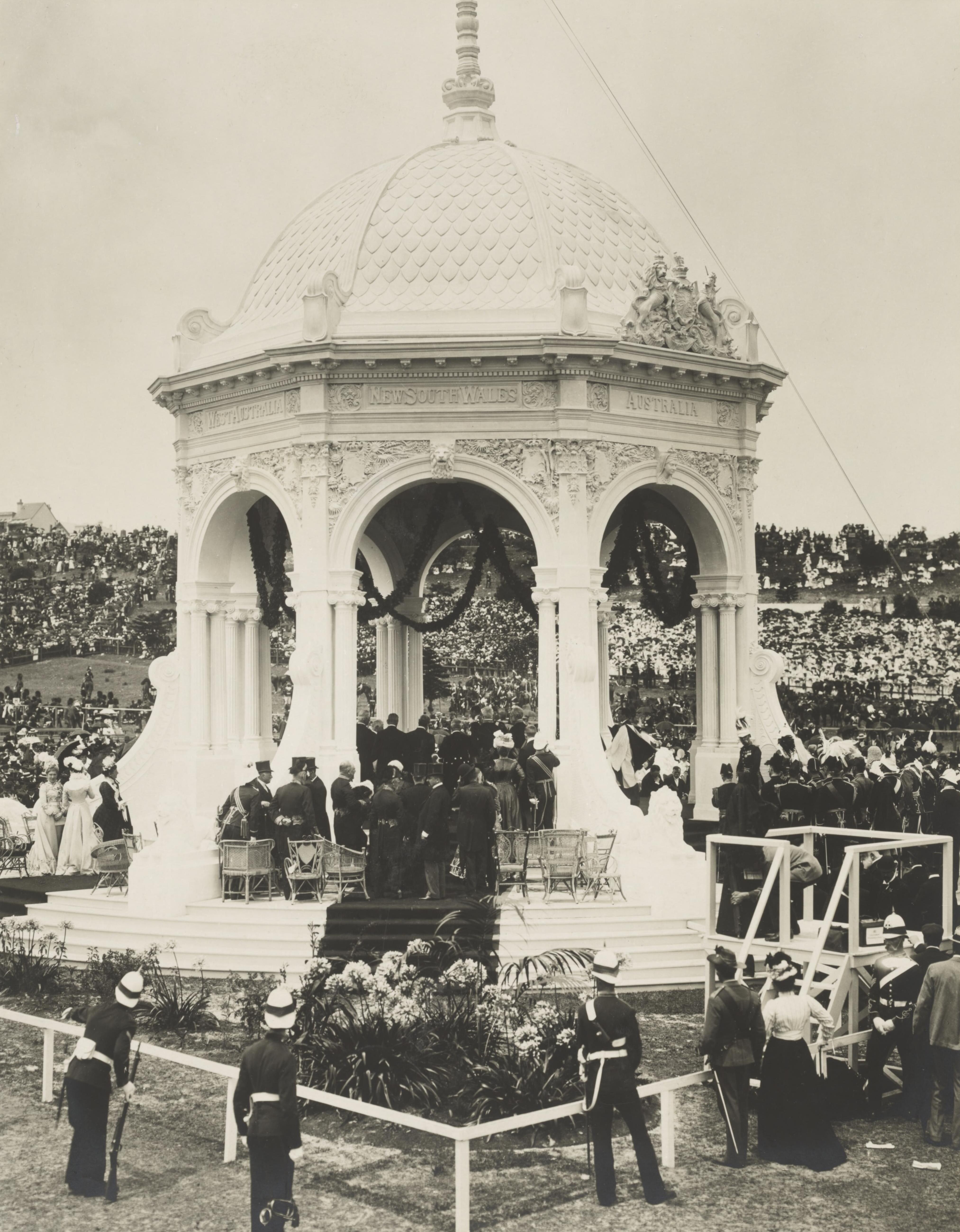
The pavilion during the swearing-in ceremony on 1 January 1901

The pavilion's timber structure was used as the site for the swearing in of the first Governor-General of Australia, John Hope, 7th Earl of Hopetoun, the first Prime Minister of Australia, Edmund Barton, and the first Cabinet at the official inauguration of the federation of the colonies in Centennial Park, Sydney, on 1 January 1901. The structure was the specially erected focal point of the official ceremony to inaugurate the Commonwealth of Australia on 1 January 1901. The ceremony was accompanied by much pomp and attended by a vast crowd of 60,000 onlookers. The swearing in oaths were administered by the Lieutenant Governor and Chief Justice of New South Wales, Sir Frederick Matthew Darley.

Originally the pavilion stood 14m high and was covered with ornate details rendered in fibrous plaster. The building was the responsibility of the Decorations and Illuminations Committee for the celebrations, with the New South Wales Government Architect taking a prominent role. It is not known however who designed the structure. The work appears to have been financed out of the Citizens' Commonwealth Celebrations Fund.

Frederick Winchester Grant was (in Tracey's view) the principal plasterwork modeller in his firm Grant and Cocks. He undertook the work for the Federation Pavilion, an ornate, fibrous plaster and wood structure designed by architect Walter Liberty Vernon for the ceremony to mark the inauguration of the Commonwealth by New South Wales Government.

The pavilion was raised on a platform consisting of a huge slab of polished Moruya granite with six sides to represent the original six states of the federation. Known as the Commonwealth Stone, the slab was later, in 1904, embedded into the ground as a permanent memorial to mark the exact spot where the Commonwealth came into being.

Following the inauguration ceremony, a number of people suggested that the original fibrous plaster ornamentations should be remade in marble. No action was taken in relation to these suggestions, and in 1902 the pavilion was reported in the Botanic Gardens and Domain Report for that year to be in a very dilapidated condition. The report recommended the pavilion's removal. It was soon put up for sale and bought by the Municipality of Concord for the sum of £60. At the time of purchase the plaster ornamentations had all but disintegrated, leaving the wooden skeleton or frame on which they had been erected.

The pavilion was moved (the shell of the rotunda) by Concord Council to Cabarita Park (then known as Mortlake Park) in 1903 though it was now stripped of all its original ornamentation. As part of the Jubilee of Federation celebrations, the Lieutenant Governor and the Chief Justice of NSW, Kenneth Street, unveiled a memorial tablet and plaque in the pavilion at its new location in Cabarita Park on 9 May 1951. The ceremony was organised by Concord Council and attended by some 10,000 people. Representatives of 14 harbourside councils also attended, while the Mayor of Concord, Ald. H. F. Stanton, read messages from 18 other city and suburban councils. The messages had been delivered by runners from the Western Suburbs Amateur Athletic Association who had taken part in an 11-mile relay around Concord Municipality before the ceremony. Messages of goodwill were also received from the then Lord Hopetoun and his son, the Marquis. Accompanying the ceremony were exhibitions of basketball, gymnastic displays and aquatic events, including water-skiing and speedboat racing. The Navy League, local Boy Scouts and Sea Scouts formed guards of honour for the distinguished guests after unveiling the plaque.

A proposal to restore the pavilion to its original appearance, but using marble for the ornamental features, arose in 1972. However this was refused by the NSW Government Architect because of the difficulties involved, the lack of any known plans and drawings for the structure, the fact that it would not be satisfactory to reproduce in durable material ornamentation that was originally designed to be temporary. In 1983, the NSW Premier's Department initiated moves to return the pavilion to its original location in Centennial Park in preparation for the Centenary of Federation celebrations in 2001. This proposal was rejected unanimously by Concord Council, its members indignantly pointing out that the structure would not have survived at all but for its purchase, re-erection and maintenance by the council.

From at least the 1980s the pavilion in Cabarita Park has been used as the venue for wedding parties and band recitals.

In 1988, a new and permanent Federation Pavilion, designed by architect Alexander Tzannes in post modern style and evoking the form of a classical rotunda was erected over the granite slab in Centennial Park, the Bicentennial year of European settlement.

Other structures in Cabarita Park over the years have included a boatshed, netted harbour swimming baths, Cabarita Swimming Centre, a kiosk/caretaker's cottage, picnic shelters, marina, boat ramp, children's playground and Rivercat ferry wharf.

== Description ==
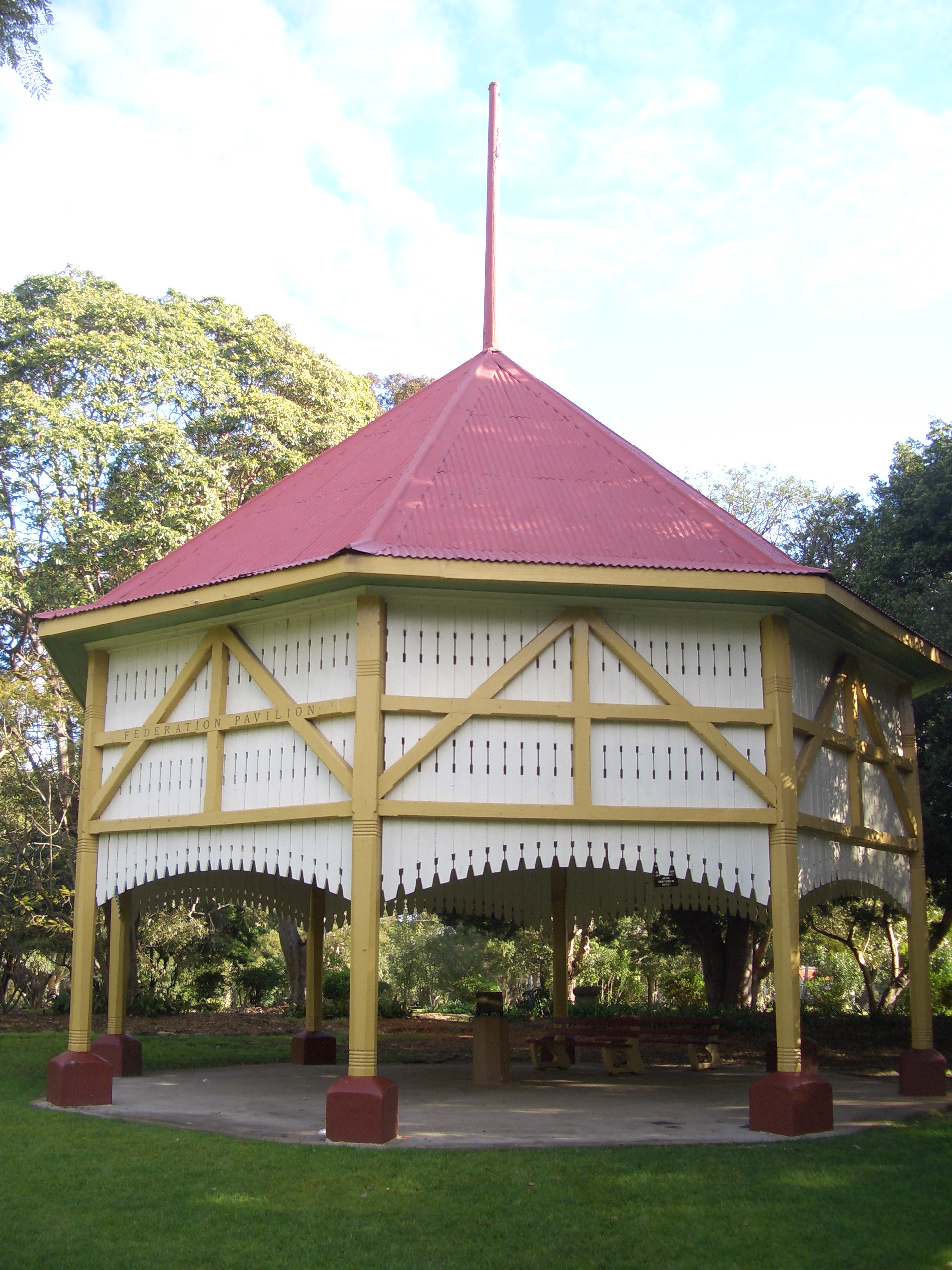
The remains of the pavilion in Cabarita Park, 2007

The pavilion is much altered from its original 1901 appearance, with most of its ornate features gone. These include the arches and grouped Ionic columns, the entablature, the Commonwealth Coat of Arms, lion head keystones and the roof with its shingle motif and finial. Though it retains the general form of the original, the pavilion is now a much plainer structure. It is not elevated as it was in 1901, but rests on a slab of concrete level with the surrounding ground. The pillars supporting the dome are plain timber posts which formed the core of the original Ionic columns. The arches resting on the pillars have been replaced with a series of vertical timber battens. It is not clear how much of the original fabric remains.

The pavilion was reported to be well maintained and in good condition as of 14 February 2007.

== Heritage listing ==
The pavilion structure is significant as the timber frame of the pavilion that was used as the site for the swearing in of the first Governor General of Australia, Lord Hopetoun, the first prime Minister, Edmund Barton, and the first Cabinet at the official inauguration of federation in Centennial Park, Sydney, on 1 January 1901.

The structure is highly valued by the community for its symbolic and cultural associations as the focal point of the official ceremony to inaugurate the Commonwealth of Australia on 1 January 1901.

The structure is significant for its association with important figures in Australia's history, particularly those involved in the federation of the Australian colonies and the formation of the Commonwealth of Australia. Pre-eminent among these figures are Edmund Barton, the first Prime Minister, and Lord Hopetoun, the first Governor General.

The pavilion was moved (the shell of the rotunda) to Cabarita Park in 1903.

Federation Pavilion, Cabarita Park was listed on the New South Wales State Heritage Register on 22 December 2000.
