= Charing Cross (disambiguation) =

Charing Cross may refer to:

== Australia ==
- Charing Cross, New South Wales
  - Charing Cross (homestead)
- Charing Cross, Bendigo, Victoria

== Canada ==
- Charing Cross, Ontario, in Chatham-Kent

== India ==
- Charring Cross, Ooty, in Nilgiri district, Tamil Nadu

== New Zealand ==
- Charing Cross statistical area, in Canterbury Region

== Pakistan ==
- Charing Cross, Lahore

== United Kingdom ==
England

- Charing Cross, London
  - Charing Cross Road
  - Charing Cross railway station
  - Charing Cross tube station
  - Charing Cross Hospital
- Charing Cross, Birkenhead (junction of Whetstone Lane, Exmouth Street, Grange Road West and Oxton Road)

Scotland

- Charing Cross, Glasgow
  - Charing Cross (Glasgow) railway station
- Charing Cross, Greenock (junction of Rue End Street, Main Street and Arthur Street)
