= Robert Bitmead =

Robert Bitmead may refer to:

- Bob Bitmead (born 1942), Australian cricketer
- Robert R. Bitmead, American engineer
