= Chester Francis Cobb =

Australian-born English novelist (1899–1943)

- Born: 8 June 1899; Sydney, New South Wales
- Died: 17 February 1943 (aged 43); Oxford, Oxfordshire, England
- Education: Sydney Grammar School
- Occupations: Novelist; journalist
- Writing career
- Notable works: Mr. Moffatt (1925); Days of disillusion (1926)

Chester Francis Cobb (8 June 1899 – 17 February 1943) was an Australian-born English novelist. Born in Waverley, Sydney, Cobb became a reporter for The Daily Telegraph and moved to Oxfordshire after 1921. He had a brief literary career and wrote two published novels. Although he never returned to Australia, he drew on his experiences there in his works and is notable as the first Australia-born novelist to use a stream of consciousness device in his works.

== Life and career ==
Chester Francis Cobb was born on 8 June 1899 at Charing Cross in Waverley, Sydney. His father was chemist Joseph Septimus Cobb, an English immigrant from Sheffield who owned a pharmacy below their apartment. His mother, Rosalie Thomasina Kate Cockburn (née Smith), was born in Geelong. Cobb regularly read fiction as a child and stopped going to church very early. He was educated at Sydney Grammar School, but left early to start a cadetship at The Daily Telegraph, later becoming a reporter.

In 1921, shortly after coming into a small inheritance from his mother's death, Cobb left for Oxfordshire, England and became a poultry farmer. It is unknown why he left Australia. Cobb married Barbara Anne Convy, who was twenty years older than him, on 31 March 1924 at Little Rollright. After several rejected manuscripts, his first novel, Mr. Moffatt, was published by Allen & Unwin in 1925. The following year, an American edition was published by G.H. Doran and Cobb's second novel, Days of disillusion, was published by Allen & Unwin. He wrote a third novel which was never published—it is possible that Cobb retired from writing as he received almost no income from poor sales. Poultry farming was his main source of income until at least 1938, when he became a sub-editor on The Countryman. He died on 17 February 1943 after a gallbladder operation at Radcliffe Infirmary.

== Literary analysis and reception ==
Cobb had only a brief literary career, but he is notable as the first Australia-born novelist to use the stream-of-consciousness technique. His novels draw upon his experiences in Australia. Mr. Moffatt follows middle-aged chemist John J. Moffatt, the owner of a pharmacy in "Claverley, Sydney" (a fictional equivalent of Waverley) in 1924, who takes a painting to London to be valued only to discover it is only a reproduction, but receives several offers for it there—when Moffatt returns to Sydney, his wife is in hospital and shortly dies, his daughter leaves for Adelaide, he is unable to sell the painting and his business declines. Days of disillusion chronicles six days in the life of Robert Watson from age eight to forty, and opens in 1894, also in "Claverley".

In his 1961 reassessment of Cobb's work, Stanley Tick.

Both novels concern the "spiritual odyssey" of their main characters, which came from an interest in religion which led Cobb to question orthodox Christianity when he was young and then, in England, embrace theosophy.

== Bibliography ==
- Cobb, Chester Francis (1925). Mr. Moffatt. London: Allen & Unwin.
  - Cobb, Chester Francis (1926). Mr. Moffatt. New York: George H. Doran Company.
- Cobb, Chester Francis (1926). Days of disillusion. London: Allen & Unwin.
