= Anthony Steel =

Anthony Steel or Tony Steel may refer to:

- Anthony Steel (actor) (1920–2001), British actor
- Anthony Steel (historian) (1900–1973), British historian
- Anthony Steel (arts leader), active in Australia from 1972
- Tony Steel (1941–2018), New Zealand rugby player and politician

== See also ==
- Tony Steele (born 1942), Australian cricketer
