= Eastern Suburbs Leagues Club =

Rugby league club in Sydney, Australia

Coordinates: 33.8927°S 151.2490°E

Eastern Suburbs Leagues Club, or 'easts' as it is now known, is a licensed club that was established in 1961 with the purpose of raising revenue to support and promote the Eastern Suburbs District Rugby League Football Club and rugby league within the Eastern Suburbs of Sydney, Australia. The club describes itself as "the home of the Sydney Roosters".

Since its establishment it has progressed on to become one of the larger leagues clubs in comparison to others supporting teams in the National Rugby League competition. The primary clubhouse of the Easts Group, is located at Bondi Junction in Sydney's east, operating on the same site continuously since 1967. The Easts Group also owns licensed premises at Waverley and Kingswood in Sydney, and Berkeley in the Illawarra.

== Establishment and history ==
By the late 1950s, most Sydney Rugby League (now National Rugby League) clubs had established licensed premises to provide revenues to support the operations of their parent Rugby League team. The one remaining exception to this was the foundation Eastern Suburbs District Rugby League Football Club, now known as the Sydney Roosters. In around 1960, Millers Breweries, then one of the largest brewers in Australia, approached the Easts club with a plan to underwrite the operations of a licensed premises in Sydney's east. The football club acquiesced to this suggestion and in 1961, Eastern Suburbs Leagues Club Limited was established, first operating out of a building on the Bondi Beach promenade.

Due to the success of the new Easts Leagues Club, the organisation quickly outgrew its beachside location, and with Millers, looked to acquire a site in the booming commercial district of Bondi Junction in the adjacent suburb. The Junction, as it is known, was conveniently located on the then Sydney tramlines (and later the Eastern Suburbs Railway) and was halfway between the team's beachside and inner-eastern suburbs heartlands. Millers Breweries believed the Bondi Junction location would be perfect for a Rugby League and hospitality venue, and the football club believed the location would be convenient for post-match functions after home games at the old Sydney Sports Ground.

Easts and Millers originally purchased a building located between Spring Street and Oxford Street in Bondi Junction. Notwithstanding this purchase, the club had grander plans for a larger clubhouse. As such, while operating from its successful new premises, Easts purchased the site of the old Bondi Junction ice-skating rink on the opposite side of Spring Street, as well as adjoining premises on Bronte Road in the Junction. The plan, which came to fruition in 1967, was for Easts to move to the larger side fronting two of the Junction's main streets. Easts have operated from the new site since then, as a hospitality and clubhouse venue, and subsequently built a large commercial tower above the Leagues Club premises.

Since the late 1990s, the expanded 'Easts Group' has acquired additional clubhouses by amalgamating with former lawn bowls and other Rugby League clubs, with Easts retaining control of the merged entities.

== Facilities ==
The Easts Group of clubs provide facilities including hospitality, such as bars, bistros and restaurants, gymnasiums, lawn bowls fields, gaming and racing areas, corporate and personal function rooms, a swimming pool at the Bondi Junction club, and areas reserved for Sydney Roosters football team post-match supporter functions. Team merchandise is also available at some of the clubs.

Not only does the Easts Group continue to support the Sydney Roosters and provide a house facility for members and their guests, Easts has expanded into other areas of interest including:

- Kingswood Sports Club, Western Sydney
- Berkeley Sports Club, Illawarra region
- Waverley Bowls Club, Eastern Suburbs (under development)

== See also ==
- List of pubs in Australia
- List of restaurant in Australia
