= Tony Steele =

Personal information
- Full name: John Anthony Steele
- Born: 13 November 1942 (age 83); Waverley, New South Wales, Australia
- Batting: Right-handed
- Role: Batsman, occasional wicketkeeper

Domestic team information
- Years: Team
- 1968-69 to 1970-71: New South Wales

Career statistics
Competition	FC	List A
Matches	22	1
Runs scored	1168	10
Batting average	36.50	10.00
100s/50s	3/4	0/0
Top score	158	10
Balls bowled	24	–
Wickets	0	–
Bowling average	–	–
5 wickets in innings	0	–
10 wickets in match	0	n/a
Best bowling	–	–
Catches/stumpings	27/2	1/0
- Source: Cricinfo, 28 February 2016

John Anthony "Tony" Steele (born 13 November 1942 in Waverley, Sydney, New South Wales) is a former first-class cricketer who played 15 Sheffield Shield matches for New South Wales from 1968–69 to 1970–71.

Steele was educated at North Sydney Boys High School. A right-handed batsman, he appeared in 22 first-class matches between 1968 and 1971, scoring 1,168 runs at 36.50 with three hundreds against Queensland (158), South Australia (152) and Western Australia (123). He also took 27 catches and, as an occasional wicket-keeper, made two stumpings. He scored 10 in his only List A match. He also played for New South Wales Colts in the 1966/67 season and appeared for a Tasmania Combined XI in a first-class match in 1970/71.

He toured New Zealand with an Australian team in 1969-70, playing three matches for Australia against New Zealand and three for the Australians against domestic first-class teams. His games against New Zealand do not count as Test matches although New Zealand fielded their full-strength Test team.

== See also ==
- List of New South Wales representative cricketers
