= Queens Park, New South Wales =

Queens Park
- Suburb
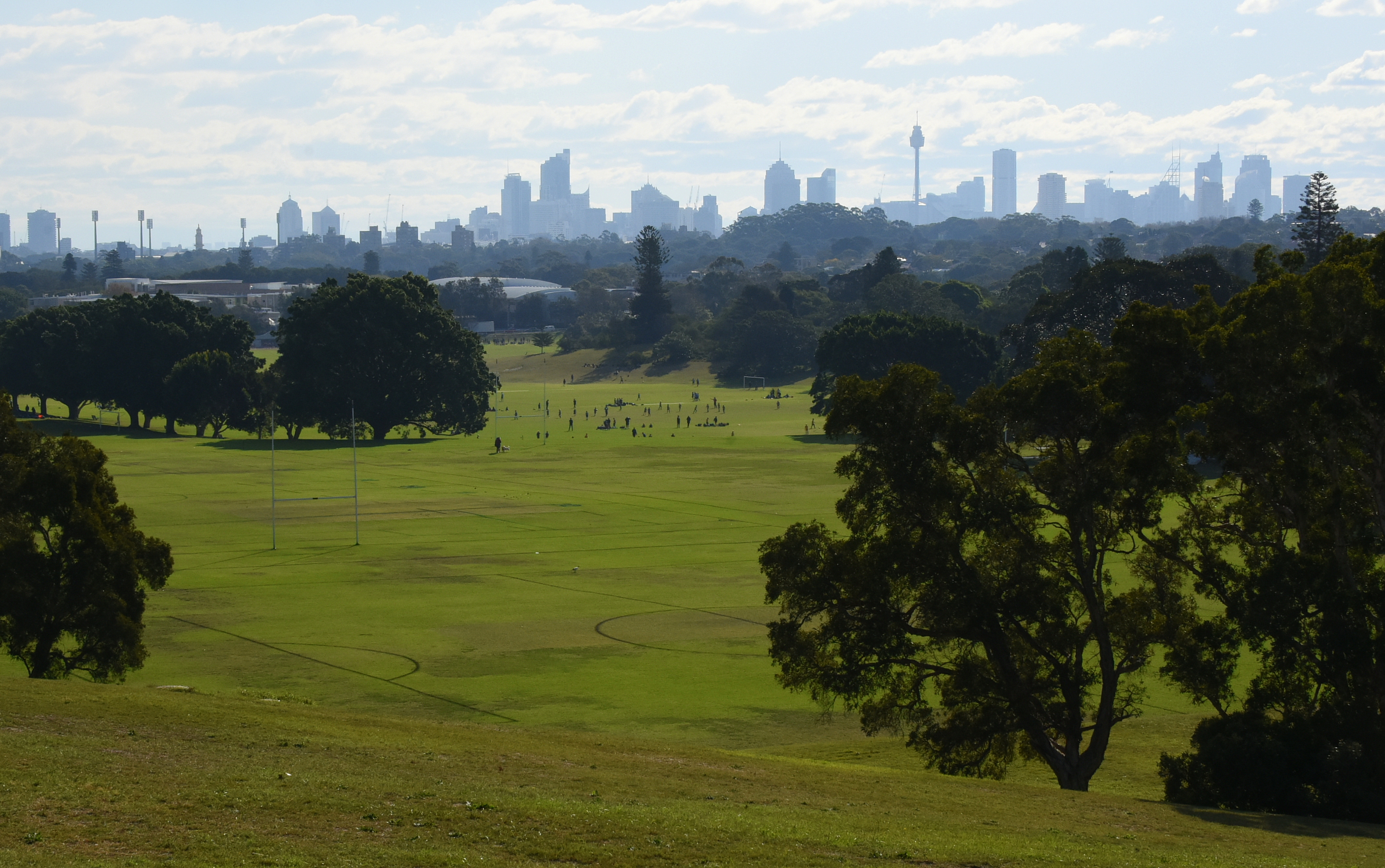
- Queens Park, view towards Sydney CBD

- Interactive map of Queens Park
- Coordinates: 33°54′4″S 151°14′53″E
- Country: Australia
- State: New South Wales
- City: Sydney
- LGA: Waverley Council
- Location: 6 km (3.7 mi) from Sydney CBD

Government
  - State electorate: Coogee
  - Federal division: Wentworth
- Elevation: 58 m (190 ft)

Population
  - Total: 3,143 (2021 census)
- Postcode: 2022
Suburbs around Queens Park
Centennial Park	Bondi Junction	Bondi Junction
Centennial Park	Queens Park	Charing Cross
Randwick	Randwick	Waverley

Queens Park is a small suburb in the eastern suburbs of Sydney, in the state of New South Wales, Australia, located approximately 5 kilometres (3.1 mi) from the Sydney central business district. Located north of Queen's Park (with an apostrophe), an urban park that forms part of the Centennial Parklands, the suburb is located in the local government area of Waverley Council.

== Geography ==
The suburb is bounded by the suburbs of Centennial Park to the west, Waverley and Charing Cross to the east, Bondi Junction to the north and Randwick to the south.

The suburb surrounds the park with houses on three sides; however only houses on the park's northern and eastern sides form the suburb of Queens Park. The area previously formed part of the suburb of Bondi Junction but was proclaimed a suburb by the Geographical Names Board of New South Wales on 2 October 1992. Houses on the eastern side date from the Victorian era. Those on the northern and southern sides are mainly Federation.

Significant sites in the suburb include the Eastern Suburb Banksia Scrub located on the south eastern side of the Moriah College site, Moriah College, and the building contained within the college that formed the former Eastern Suburbs Hospital.

== History ==
Queens Park takes its name from the park of the same name on its southern border.

The 1st Australian Field Ambulance was raised on 24 August 1914 at Queens Park. Nearly two months were spent at the camp before the order was given to embark.

Once part of Bondi Junction, the suburb's name was officially recognised in 1992 following a submission to Waverley Council by a local author Mark Roeder, and a subsequent referendum. Notwithstanding the name change, many of the longer-term residents of the suburb still refer to the area as Bondi Junction.

== Heritage listings ==
Queens Park has a number of heritage-listed sites, including

- 11 Victoria Street: Charing Cross (homestead)

== Population ==
In the 2021 Census, there were 3,143 people in Queens Park. 66.4% of people were born in Australia. The next most common country of birth was England at 7.1%. 80.5% of people spoke only English at home. The most common responses for religion were No Religion 41.2%, Catholic 23.0% and Judaism 10.9%.

== The park ==
Queen's Park was originally part of the Sydney Common and later the Lachlan Swamps Water Reserve. Today it is a large urban park, part of the Centennial Parklands. It was dedicated with Centennial Park in 1888 as part of the centenary celebrations of European settlement in Australia. Numerous playing fields are located on the southern and western flatter sections of the park. It has been used for sports fields since 1938. Moriah College, which is located on the park's western boundary, also uses the park for its PDHPE lessons and other schools in Sydney also use the park. The Centennial Park & Moore Park Trust undertook major renovations of Queen's Park in 2009 to improve the quality of the playing fields which are used daily. The Trust also completed a major renovation of the popular children's playground in 2009, and developed a shared cycleway to link the eastern suburbs cycle network with Centennial Park.
