= Geoff Davies (Australian cricketer) =

Australian cricketer (born 1946)

Personal information
- Full name: Geoffrey Robert Davies
- Born: 22 July 1946 (age 80); Randwick, New South Wales, Australia
- Batting: Right-handed
- Bowling: Right-arm leg-spin and googly

Domestic team information
- Years: Team
- 1965-66 to 1971-72: New South Wales

Career statistics
Competition	FC	List A
Matches	73	4
Runs scored	3903	79
Batting average	36.13	19.75
100s/50s	6/22	0/0
Top score	127	42
Balls bowled	6786	52
Wickets	107	0
Bowling average	32.18	–
5 wickets in innings	2	0
10 wickets in match	0	n/a
Best bowling	6/43	–
Catches/stumpings	70/0	0/0
- Source: ESPNcricinfo, 12 July 2017

Geoffrey Robert Davies (born 22 July 1946) is a former Australian cricketer. He played 73 first-class matches, mostly for New South Wales, between 1965/66 and 1971/72. He toured New Zealand with the Australian team in 1966-67 and 1969-70, and was once 12th man for the Australian Test team.

Davies was a middle-order batsman and leg-spin bowler. When he was chosen to tour New Zealand in 1967 The Canberra Times said he was "destined to become a permanent member of the Australian side – if he retains his promise". He played as the professional for East Lancashire in the Lancashire League in 1967 and was one of the league's leading players, scoring 695 runs at an average of 48.98 and taking 40 wickets at 15.97. He scored 112 and took 6 for 43 in the second innings in New South Wales' victory over Queensland in 1967-68. He was considered a contender for the 1968 tour of England, but was not selected.

== See also ==
- List of New South Wales representative cricketers
