= Sam Trimble =

Australian cricketer (1934–2019)

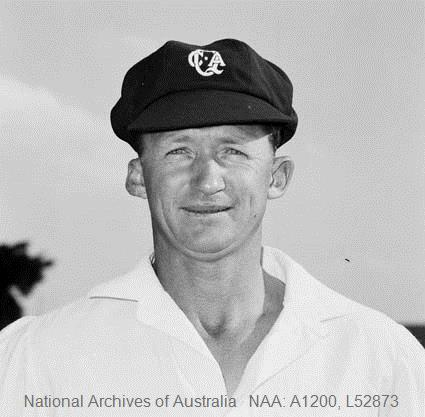
- Trimble in 1965

Personal information
- Full name: Samuel Christy Trimble
- Born: 16 August 1934; Lismore, New South Wales
- Died: 29 July 2019 (aged 84); Brisbane, Queensland
- Batting: Right-handed
- Relatives: Glenn Trimble (son)

Domestic team information
- Years: Team
- 1959/60–1975/76: Queensland

Career statistics
Competition	First-class	List A
Matches	144	12
Runs scored	10,282	245
Batting average	41.79	22.27
100s/50s	26/48	0/2
Top score	252*	56
Balls bowled	231	–
Wickets	3	–
Bowling average	59.00	–
5 wickets in innings	0	–
10 wickets in match	0	–
Best bowling	2/15	–
Catches/stumpings	86/–	6/–
- Source: Cricinfo, 30 May 2014

Samuel Christy Trimble, MBE (16 August 1934 – 29 July 2019) was an Australian first-class cricketer who played for Queensland between 1959–60 and 1975–76.

Trimble began his career in New South Wales, but unable to break into the state team he moved to Queensland. He was a right-handed opening batsman, and despite a prolific career for Queensland he never represented Australia in Tests, due to the success of Australian openers Bill Lawry and Bob Simpson. The closest he got was as 12th man for Australia in the West Indies in 1964–65. He also captained the Australian team that toured New Zealand in 1969–70 when the Test team was in South Africa; he scored 213 not out in the unofficial Third Test in Wellington, batting for eight hours in difficult conditions in an Australian total of 353.

In the 1963–64 season he scored 1006 runs at an average of 83.83, with his highest score of 252 not out against New South Wales. In 1970–71, he scored 177 against an MCC attack which included John Snow, Derek Underwood, Ray Illingworth and Peter Lever. He captained Queensland from 1967–68 to 1971–72.

He finished his 144-game career with 10,282 runs at 41.79. Until Stuart Law passed him in the late 1990s, he was the all-time leading run-scorer for Queensland.

Trimble was made a Member of the Order of the British Empire (MBE) in the 1975 Birthday Honours for services to cricket, and received the Australian Sports Medal in 2000.

Sam Trimble was the father of international batsman Glenn Trimble.

He died in Brisbane, aged 84, on 29 July 2019.
