= Charing Cross, New South Wales =

Charing Cross
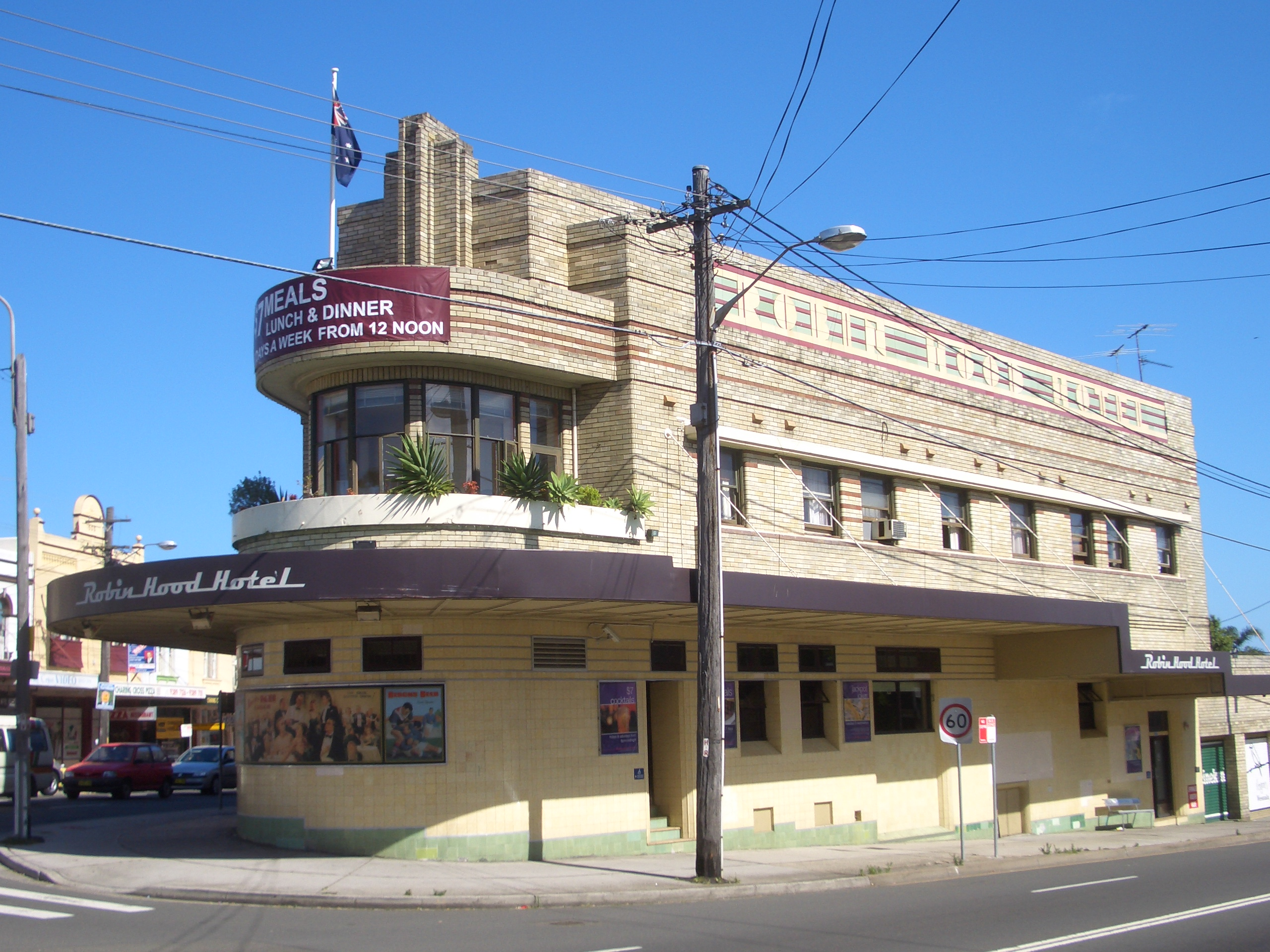
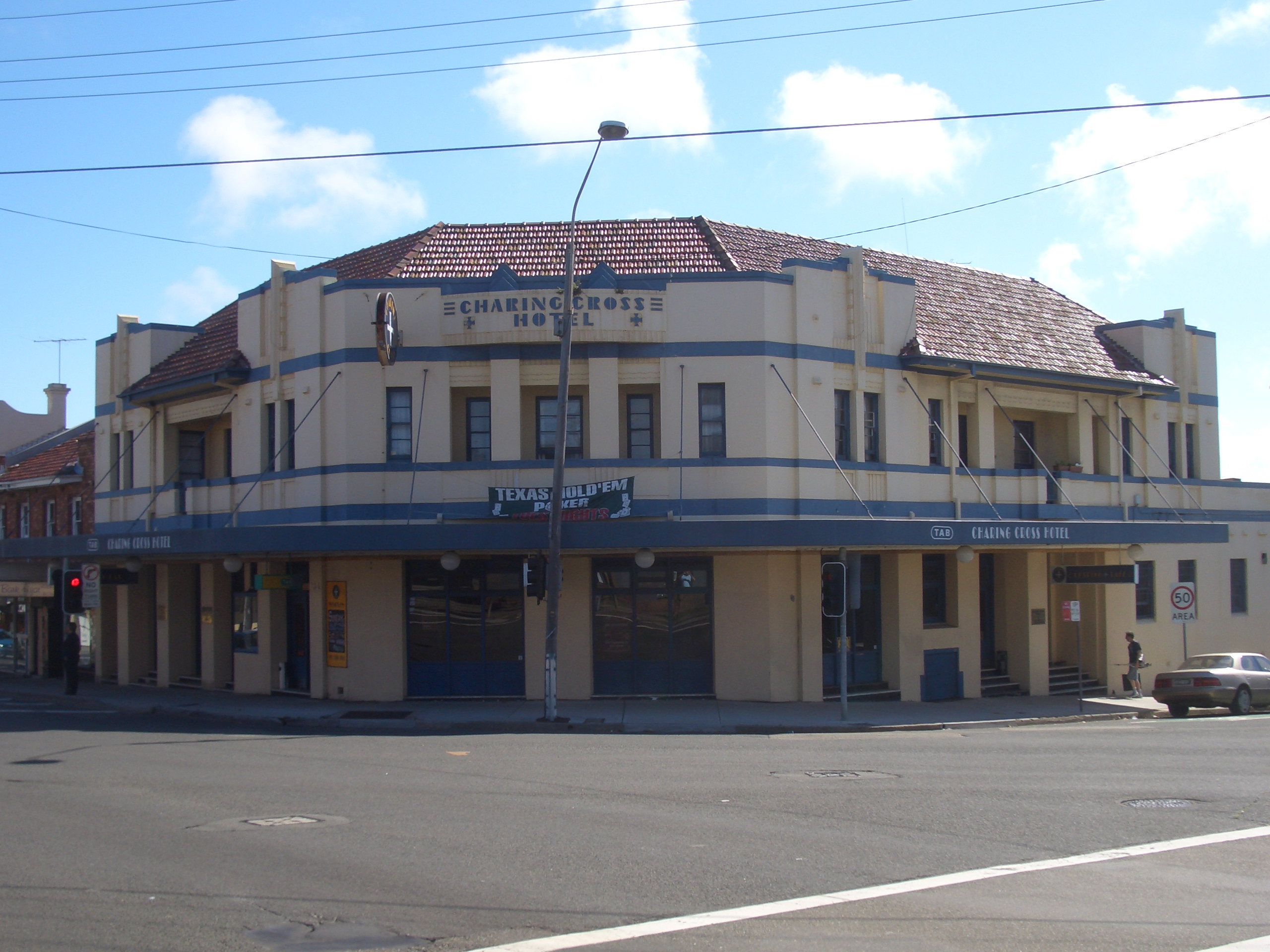
- Robin Hood Hotel, an example of the Art Deco style Charing Cross Hotel, also in the Art Deco style

- Coordinates: 33°54′01″S 151°15′13″E
- Country: Australia
- State: New South Wales
- City: Sydney
Localities around Charing Cross
| Centennial Park | Bondi Junction | Bondi |
| Queens Park | Charing Cross | Bronte |
| Randwick | Coogee | Waverley |

Charing Cross is a precinct in the suburb of Waverley, Sydney, Australia. It is used to describe the intersection of Bronte Road and Carrington Road and the short shopping strip extending to the east along Bronte Road, and is used as a reference point for the homes and schools located around it.

== Brief history ==
The locality originally called Madden's Corner, was named after Charing Cross, London, England by Waverley Council on 6 September 1859.

Charing Cross was once planned by the council to be the commercial and retail centre of Waverley. It was a much more significant shopping area prior to the rise in importance of Bondi Junction. It fell into decline with shops closing. However, the recent increase of interest in Charing Cross is reflecting the gentrification of the area with the moving in of up-market clothing and gourmet food stores and restaurants.

== Sport and recreation ==
Charing Cross is represented in one of the most popular sporting competitions across Australia, the National Rugby League competition, by the local team the Sydney Roosters. St Charles Junior Rugby League Club, one of the junior clubs in the Roosters Juniors, is also based near Charing Cross.

== NSW Heritage items ==
- "Charing Cross (house)". New South Wales State Heritage Register. Department of Planning & Environment. Text is licensed by State of New South Wales (Department of Planning and Environment) under CC BY 4.0 licence.
- "Charing Cross Hotel". New South Wales Heritage Database. Office of Environment & Heritage.
- "Robin Hood Hotel". New South Wales Heritage Database. Office of Environment & Heritage.

== Notable people ==
- Chester Francis Cobb (1899–1943), novelist
