= Glenn Trimble =

Australian cricketer

Personal information
- Full name: Glenn Samuel Trimble
- Born: 1 January 1963 (age 63); Herston, Queensland, Australia
- Batting: Right-handed
- Bowling: Right-arm medium
- Role: All-rounder
- Relatives: Sam Trimble (father)

International information
- National side: Australia
- ODI debut (cap 92): 19 January 1986 v New Zealand
- Last ODI: 27 January 1986 v New Zealand

Domestic team information
- Years: Team
- 1982/83–1989/90: Queensland

Career statistics
Competition	ODI	FC	LA
Matches	2	57	22
Runs scored	4	2,881	380
Batting average	4.00	33.11	22.35
100s/50s	0/0	4/16	1/0
Top score	4	138*	100*
Balls bowled	24	1,848	120
Wickets	0	30	0
Bowling average	–	29.33	–
5 wickets in innings	–	1	–
10 wickets in match	–	0	–
Best bowling	–	5/50	–
Catches/stumpings	1/–	55/–	7/–
- Source: Cricinfo, 12 January 2015

Glenn Samuel Trimble (born 1 January 1963) is a former cricketer who represented Australia and Queensland. A batsman who preferred to play straight, and a part-time medium pace bowler, Trimble was a regular member of the Queensland side in the mid-1980s, and won an Esso Scholarship in 1986, playing with the Essex County Cricket Club Second XI in England.

He played in four losing Queensland Sheffield Shield final teams.

== Biography ==
Born in Brisbane, Queensland, the son of former Queensland cricket captain and opening batsman Sam Trimble, Glenn Trimble attended Brisbane State High School and played in the cricket team.

Trimble was selected for the Australian Under 19 team in February 1982 and played three "tests" against the touring Pakistan U-19 team. (The captain was Mike Veletta and his teammates included Craig McDermott; Saleem Malik captained the Pakistan side). He scored 116 in the second test. He scored 232 runs over the 3 tests at 46.

=== 1982-83: Queensland debut ===
Trimble made his Queensland debut in 1982–83 against WA, scoring 48.

=== 1983–84 ===
The following summer he made 84 in a Shield game against Victoria and scored useful runs in a Queensland one day victory over the touring West Indians.

Other highlights that summer included 99 against Victoria and 71 against Tasmania. He played in the Shield final, which Queensland lost to WA; Trimble scored 0 and 6.

=== 1984-85 ===
Trimble impressed over the 1984-85 summer with 42 for Qld against the touring West Indies., 90 against Victoria. and 67 not out against South Australia.

He made a century against Sri Lanka in a one-day game. but then suffered a form slump.

His form recovered towards the end of the summer making 76 against South Australia. He scored some useful knocks of 38 and 16 in the Sheffield Shield final, which Queensland narrowly lost to NSW.

=== 1985–86 season: All rounder ===
Trimble began the next summer well with 90 against Victoria. In a game against the touring New Zealand side, Trimble made 49 and 26. He had only bowled one first class over before but was given the ball and took 2–0 in his first over, and four for the game

Trimble took 2–63 against South Australia, scored 41 and took a wicket against WA, then took five wickets against Tasmania. After scoring 75 and 41 and taking two wickets against Victoria Trimble was picked in the Prime Ministers XI to play New Zealand.

He made 87 and took five wickets against South Australia.

==== One Day Internationals ====
In January 1986, Trimble was selected in the Australian one-day team as a replacement for David Hookes against the touring New Zealand cricket team.

"I was elated. I really didn't expect it and laughed off a suggestion I was even close," Trimble said. "But Dad rang from his sports centre at the Gabba and then raced in with a grin all over his face – it was all over mine too. I suppose I can now start to think that some success and more hard work could get me to New Zealand in February or India later in the year."

Trimble made his ODI debut at Perth's WACA Ground to bolster Australia’s batting line-up, replacing David Gilbert. After dropping a catch in the gully, he was later given the ball when New Zealand was 4-61. His first delivery was a bean ball which Jeff Crowe fended off for two runs; the second, another full toss, was dropped by keeper Wayne Phillips and was ruled a no ball. The third ball was a full toss which was hit for four. He ultimately bowled an erratic spell, having two chances dropped off his bowling, and being taken off after conceding 32 runs off four wicketless overs. He then batted at number eight and remained not out at the end of the innings, but did not score from any of the three balls he faced. Australia won the match by three wickets.

According to one report, "Trimble had a rough entry to international level before nearly 25,000 Perth fans and millions of TV viewers around Australia who wanted to see him fire. However, he was chosen on more than one good performance and won't be dumped completely after a single poor effort."

After being made 12th man for Australia's next match against India, Trimble was recalled for the following game against New Zealand in Adelaide, replacing fellow Queenslander Greg Ritchie. He batted at number four, scoring a boundary off the first delivery, before being caught off the bowling of Richard Hadlee on the following ball. He did not bowl. New Zealand won the match by 206 runs after an insipid batting display by the home side who were bowled out for 70 runs. Trimble was dropped.

He bounced back to take seven wickets against Tasmania, including his first five wicket haul, 5-50 . He scored 152 in a club game. An impetuous shot in a McDonald's Cup match however was thought to have led to a Queensland collapse.

At the end of the summer he was awarded a 12-week Esso scholarship in England. The other scholarship winners were Mark Waugh, Keith Bradshaw and Denis Hickey. The Australian Test selectors, chairman Lawrie Sawle, Greg Chappell, Dick Guy and Jim Higgs, gave the awards in line with the requirements of the host English clubs - Glamorgan, Essex, Middlesex and Sussex - who emphasised the need for all-rounders.

He scored his debut first class century in the 85-86 Sheffield Shield final against NSW, which Queensland drew (thereby losing the Shield because NSW were hosting). He scored 605 runs at 37.81 and took 29 wickets at 26.17 that summer. He would only take one more first class wicket in his entire career.

=== 1986 ===
In 1986 Trimble played for the Essex Second XI and Essex Under 25 team in England.

=== 1986–87 ===
In 1986-87 Trimble scored 115 runs in 166 minutes against Tasmania.

Other highlights of the summer included 63 and five catches against Tasmania, 57 against NSW, and 43 and 66 against WA He made 562 runs at 37.46. However he barely bowled, taking 0-63 for the whole summer, was unable to force his way back into the Australian side.

=== 1987–88 ===
Trimble scored his third first class century against Victoria in 1987–88, a knock off 112. In that game he combined for a Queensland record fifth-wicket stand of 231 with Allan Border. He later made 68 against NSW, 67, 57 against South Australia and 138 against Tasmania. He ended the summer with his fourth Shield final, only scoring 18 runs in another Queensland defeat.

Trimble scored 660 first class runs that summer at 36.66.

=== Later career ===
He began the 1988–89 season well with 62 and a wicket against NSW and 43 against Tasmania. However his form fell away and he was dropped from the Queensland team.

He was recalled. He was dropped again later in the season. He scored 157 runs at an average of 22.42.

Trimble played two more first class games for Queensland in 1989–90 with a top score of 39.

Trimble played in 57 Sheffield Shield and other first-class matches for Queensland by his retirement in 1989–90.

Trimble was a noted big hitter at first grade level for South Brisbane. He is reputed to have hit a six in a first grade Final at the Gabba which went over the old Clem Jones Stand and landed in a car park on the southern side of Stanley Street.
