= Australian cricket team in New Zealand in 1969–70 =

International cricket tour

While the Australia national cricket team was touring South Africa in 1969–70, another Australian team captained by Sam Trimble toured New Zealand between late February and early April. They played three matches against New Zealand, but these were not granted Test status.

The Australians also played first-class matches against New Zealand Under-23, Central Districts, Northern Districts, Canterbury and Otago. The Australians beat Otago and New Zealand Under-23, and all the other games were drawn.

== Team ==
- Sam Trimble (captain)
- Derek Chadwick
- Greg Chappell
- Geoff Davies
- John Inverarity
- Terry Jenner
- Dennis Lillee
- John Maclean
- Kerry O'Keeffe
- David Renneberg
- Tony Steele
- Alan Thomson
- Alan Turner
- Graeme Watson
