= Australian cricket team in New Zealand in 1966–67 =

International cricket tour

While the Australia national cricket team was touring South Africa in February and March 1967, another Australian team captained by Les Favell toured New Zealand to play each of the six provinces and four matches against New Zealand, but the matches did not have Test status. The Australians won against Auckland and Otago but lost to Canterbury and in the first international match against New Zealand; the other six matches were drawn.

The loss to Canterbury was the first time Australia had lost a first-class match in New Zealand.

== Team ==
- Les Favell (captain)
- Bob Bitmead
- Brian Booth
- Peter Burge
- Alan Connolly
- Ken Cunningham
- Geoff Davies
- Eric Freeman
- Allan Frost
- John Gleeson
- Barry Jarman
- Norm O'Neill
- Peter Philpott
- Paul Sheahan

It was a strong team. Seven of them had played Test cricket and three later played in Tests. Some observers considered it a stronger side than the Australian Test team that was touring South Africa at the time.
