= Allan Frost =

Australian cricketer

Personal information
- Full name: Allan Russell Frost
- Born: 2 December 1942 (age 83); Adelaide, South Australia
- Batting: Right-handed
- Bowling: Right-arm fast

Domestic team information
- Years: Team
- 1965–66 to 1967–68: South Australia

Career statistics
Competition	First-class
Matches	24
Runs scored	114
Batting average	4.95
100s/50s	0/0
Top score	27
Balls bowled	4458
Wickets	72
Bowling average	29.04
5 wickets in innings	3
10 wickets in match	0
Best bowling	5/28
Catches/stumpings	6/0
- Source: Cricinfo, 12 July 2017

Allan Russell Frost (born 2 December 1942) is a former cricketer who played first-class cricket for South Australia from 1965 to 1968.

A fast bowler, Frost took a wicket with the first ball of the innings in his first first-class match when he had MCC's Geoffrey Boycott caught by Ian Chappell on Christmas Eve 1965. He had his best season in 1966–67, when he took 33 wickets at an average of 23.69 in the Sheffield Shield. He toured New Zealand with the Australian team at the end of the season. He played in two of the four matches against New Zealand, taking six wickets, all of top-order batsmen.

His best first-class bowling figures were 5 for 28 against Wellington in February 1967. His best figures in the Sheffield Shield were 5 for 51 in the first innings against Queensland a month earlier, when he also took 4 for 22 in the second innings.

His career was curtailed by his refusal on religious grounds to play cricket on Sundays.

== See also ==
- List of South Australian representative cricketers
