= Bob Bitmead =

Australian cricketer (born 1942)

Personal information
- Full name: Robert Clyde Bitmead
- Born: 17 July 1942 (age 84); Melbourne, Australia
- Batting: Right-handed
- Bowling: Slow left-arm orthodox

Domestic team information
- Years: Team
- 1966-1968: Victoria

Career statistics
Competition	FC
Matches	16
Runs scored	90
Batting average	9.00
100s/50s	0/0
Top score	32
Balls bowled	4058
Wickets	53
Bowling average	22.30
5 wickets in innings	2
10 wickets in match	1
Best bowling	5/37
Catches/stumpings	9/0
- Source: Cricket Archive, 10 January 2022

Robert Clyde Bitmead (born 17 July 1942) is an Australian former cricketer and coach who played for Victoria between 1966 and 1968. A slow left-arm bowler known for bowling off the wrong foot, Bitmead played 16 first-class matches for Victoria and for the Australians, playing for the latter on their tour of New Zealand in 1967. He also represented Fitzroy in Victorian Premier Cricket.

Following the end of his playing career Bitmead coached at Fitzroy and Richmond, as well as the Victoria and Australia under-19 teams.

In January 2022 a number of former players made allegations of sexual misconduct against Bitmead during his time coaching both the Victoria and Australia under-19 teams.

== See also ==
- List of Victoria first-class cricketers
