= Charing Cross, Queens Park =

Charing Cross
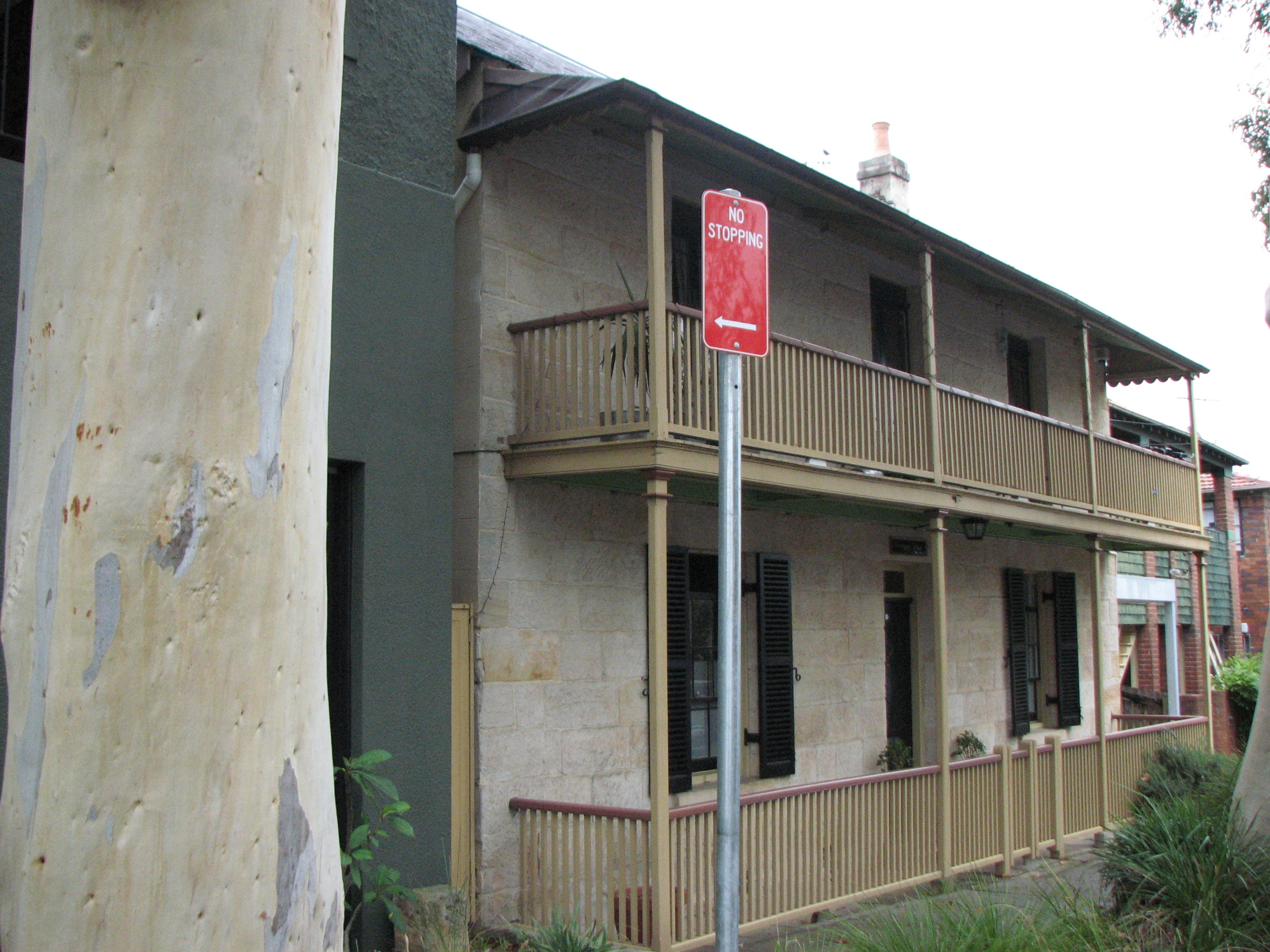
- Charing Cross, Queens Park

- Location within east Sydney Location within Australia
- 33°54′01″S 151°15′09″E
- Location: 11 Victoria Street, Queens Park, Waverley Municipality, New South Wales, Australia

History
- Built: 1860

New South Wales Heritage Register
- Official name: Charing Cross
- Type: State heritage (built)
- Designated: 2 April 1999
- Reference no.: 449
- Type: House
- Category: Residential buildings (private)

Charing Cross is a heritage-listed former homestead and former pre-school and now house and childcare centre at 11 Victoria Street, Queens Park, New South Wales, a suburb of Sydney, Australia. It was built during 1860 and was added to the New South Wales State Heritage Register on 2 April 1999.

== History ==
=== Waverley ===
Waverley took its name from the title of a book by the famous Scottish author and poet, Sir Walter Scott. Its connection with the suburb of Waverley comes through Barnett Levey (or Levy, 1798-1837) who came to Sydney in the 1820s to visit his brother. When he saw how prosperous the city was becoming, Levey decided to settle here and set up a business as a general merchant. In 1831 he was granted 60 acres in the area bounded by the present Old South Head Road, Birrell Street, Paul Street and Hollywood Avenue. He must have occupied the land before the official grant because he built himself a substantial two story home on Old South Head Road in 1827, naming it Waverley House after the book by his favourite author. As time passed the house became a distinctive landmark and gave its name to the surrounding district, which was simply called Waverley. Levey established Sydney's first permanent theatre behind his shop in George Street. His projects consumed all his money, and when he died in 1837 he left a widow and four children in poverty. In 1837 the house was taken over for a Catholic school or orphanage, but it was demolished early in the 20th century.

Waverley Municipality was proclaimed in 1859. By the 1880s trams were running to the beaches in the Eastern Suburbs and Waverley became a popular picnic spot. Waverley Park had a splendid oval, used by the established Waverley District Cricket Club.

Waverley Cemetery was established in 1877 on the site of the old tram terminus, on a beautiful site near the ocean. It houses many historically notable people.

The 1866 NSW Gazetteer described Waverley as having Clough's Windmill, Allan's Soap Works, Dickson's Soap and Candle Works and Scott's Blacking and Fireworks Factory. There were also four quarries producing excellent freestone.

=== The homestead ===
Charing Cross homestead was built in the 1860s it is one of the earliest buildings in the Waverley area.

In consultation with the Heritage Branch the rear of the building was altered to accommodate a professional child minding centre. The front of the house and upstairs was used as a private residence. In 1984 the then owner applied to the Heritage Council for financial assistance to restore the facade. A dollar for dollar amount of $30,000 was provided and the work completed in 1985. One of the conditions attached to the assistance was the making of a Permanent Conservation Order which was placed over the property 11 April 1986.

== Description ==
The building comprises a two-storey structure with central hallway and two storey verandah. Little of the original internal fabric remains.

=== Modifications and dates ===
- 1985 – Façade restoration work carried out by Stonehill Restorations under the supervision of David Sheedy, Architect.

== Heritage listing ==
As at 25 May 2006, it is one of the earliest buildings in the Waverley area, having been built in the 1860s.

Charing Cross was listed on the New South Wales State Heritage Register on 2 April 1999.

== See also ==
- Australian residential architectural styles
