= Bondi Junction =

- Suburb
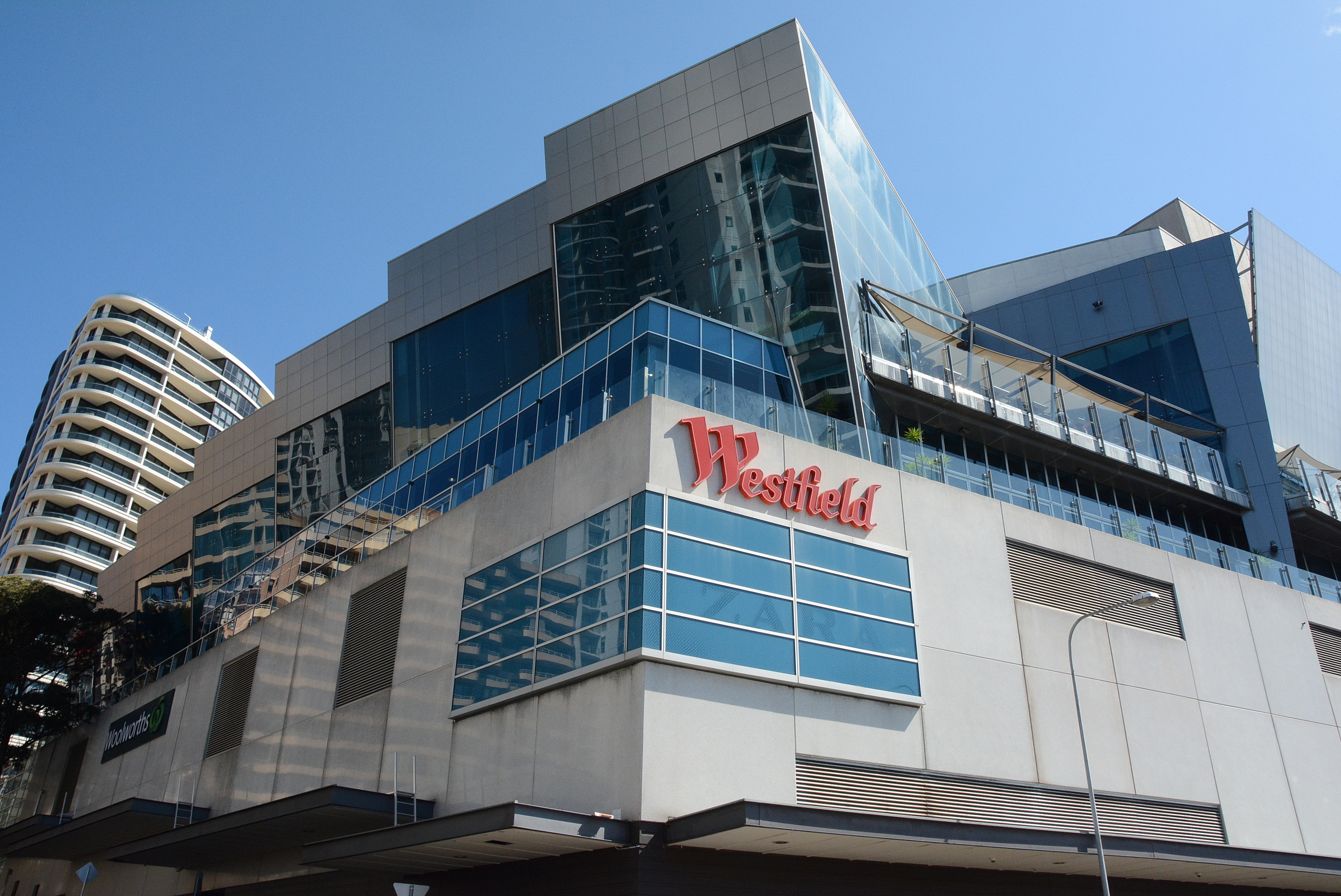
- Westfield Bondi Junction

- Interactive map of Bondi Junction
- Country: Australia
- State: New South Wales
- City: Sydney
- LGA: Waverley Council
- Location: 6 km (3.7 mi) east of Sydney CBD
- Established: 1854

Government
  - State electorates: Coogee; Vaucluse
  - Federal division: Wentworth

Area
  - Total: 1.07 km^{2} (0.41 sq mi)
- Elevation: 85 m (279 ft)

Population
  - Total: 10,361 (SAL 2021)
- Postcode: 2022
Suburbs around Bondi Junction
Woollahra	Bellevue Hill	Bondi Beach
Centennial Park	Bondi Junction	Bondi
Queens Park	Waverley	Bronte

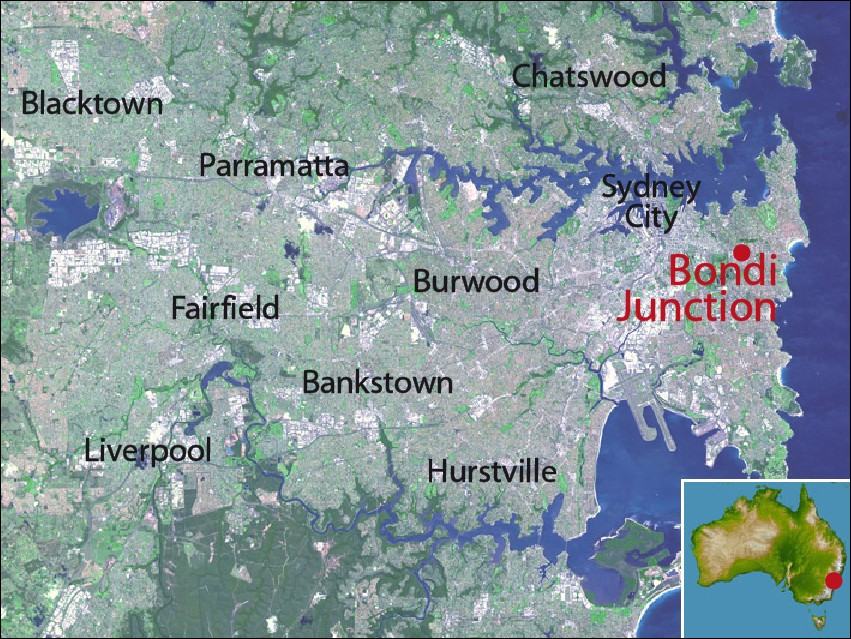
Location map of Bondi Junction based on NASA satellite images

Bondi Junction is an eastern suburb of Sydney, in the state of New South Wales, Australia. It is 6 km (3.7 mi) east of the Sydney central business district and is part of the local government area of Waverley.

Bondi Junction is a largely commercial area which has undergone many changes since the late 20th century. There have been many major commercial and residential developments around the main street and surrounding area, notably a new bus/rail interchange and large shopping mall. Many of the original pubs have been maintained, notably, the Nelson Hotel, so named because of its location on Nelson Street. Bondi Beach is a neighbouring suburb to the east with its namesake beach. Similarly named Bondi and North Bondi are also neighbouring suburbs.

Bondi Junction and the neighbouring area is well known for its famous rugby league team, the Sydney Roosters, still officially known as the Eastern Suburbs District Rugby League Football Club.

== History ==
=== Pre-colonial times and name origin ===
Before the arrival of Europeans in the Port Jackson area, the Waverley and Bondi areas were inhabited for tens of thousands of years by Aboriginal Australian peoples, who left evidence of their habitation in the form of paths, rock carvings, artefacts, and shelters. The eastern beaches were home to the Bidjigal, Birrabirragal, and Gadigal people.

The name "Bondi" is derived from the Dharawal language, spoken by the Aboriginal clans who lived further from Sydney Harbour southwards to Shoalhaven. The word Bondi, also spelt Bundi, Bundye, and Boondye, originates from the word for a loud thud, such as the sound of waves breaking over rocks, but is also associated with nulla nulla, or fighting sticks, which make a loud noise when they hit something.

=== 19th century ===
The first house in the area was Waverley House, which was built by Barnett Levey in 1827, on the current site of Waverley Street. The house changed hands many times over the years before finally being demolished in 1904. When Waverley Municipality was proclaimed in 1859, the name was taken from Waverley House.

Henry Hough was first given a grant of land on the present site of Bondi Junction in 1832. On his estate, he built a wind-powered flour mill. This was accessed by a track leading off the South Head Road (now Oxford Street), the suburb's main thoroughfare.

In 1854, the first hotel in the area opened, licensed to Alexander Gray. It was named "The Waverley Tea Gardens", and the surrounding area quickly took that name, quickly shortened to simply "Tea Gardens", which stuck for the next 30 years, before being named Bondi Junction after the trams arrived in 1881.

In 1858, the first official post office was opened, and the first school in 1879.

By 1878 steam had supplanted wind in milling and the estate was closed. In May 1881, it was subdivided. Streets in this subdivision that exist today are Mill Hill Road and Hough Street. The subdivision of the estate coincided with the opening of the first tramway to the area – steam trams began operation from Taylor Square in Darlinghurst on 12 March 1881.

A tramline was built to the Bondi Beach area in 1881, with a crossing loop line following in 1882 and the tramway junction off the Waverley line opened on 24 May 1884. The suburb acquired its name at this time.

=== 20th century ===
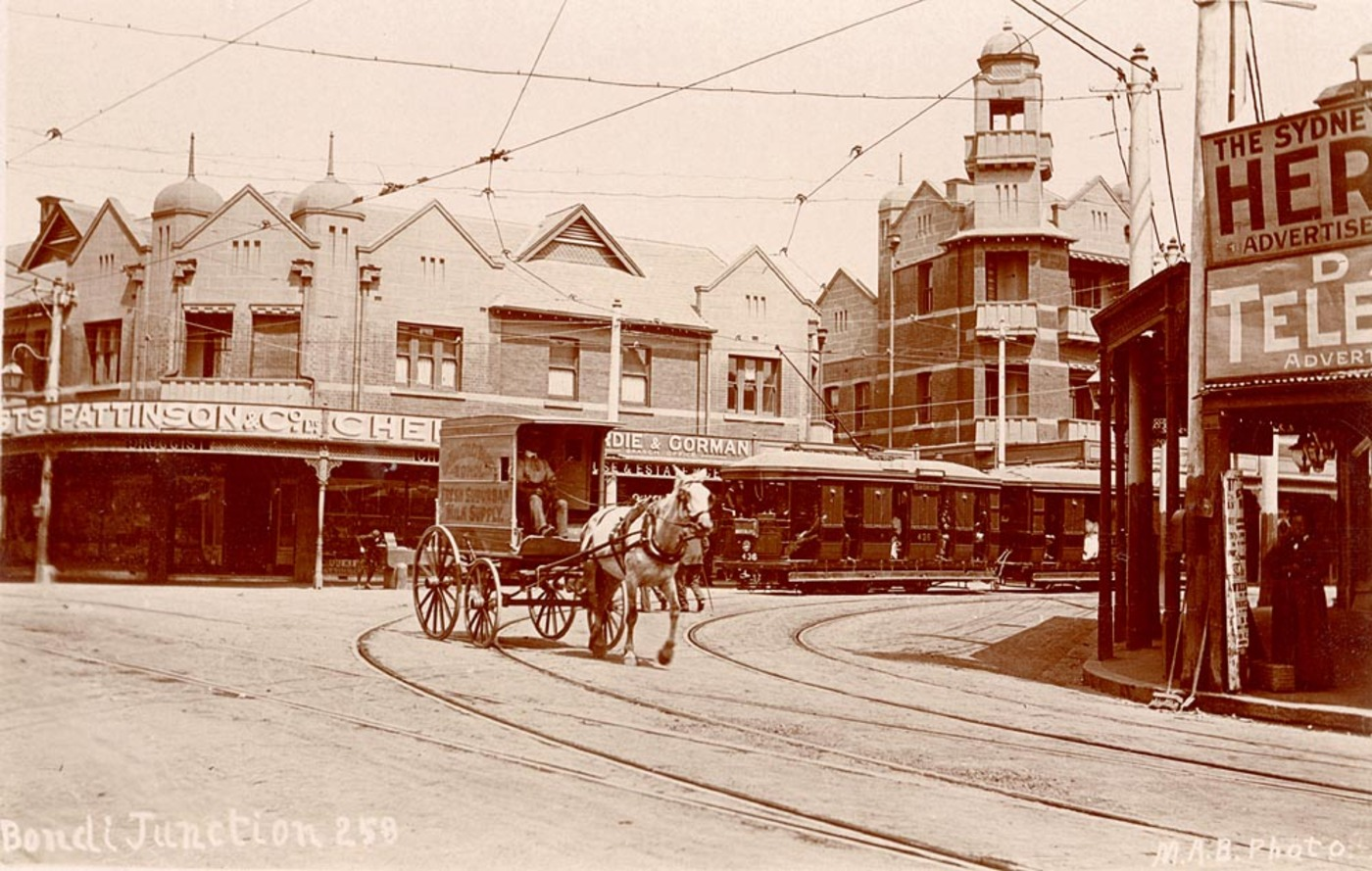
Bondi Junction in a postcard photograph taken in the period 1900–1927

With the subdivision of surrounding suburbs complete by 1930, Bondi Junction quickly grew into a major entertainment and commercial centre.

Tram lines ran to Bondi Beach via Birriga Road, Bondi Beach via Bondi Road, Bronte Beach and The Spot, Randwick and the City at Circular Quay and Central railway station. A tram depot was established on the corner of South Head Road (renamed Oxford Street with the completion of widening works in Darlinghurst) and the present day York Road. Oxford Street quickly became crowded and congested. By the 1960s traffic was at the point that Bondi Junction was one of the worst bottlenecks in Sydney. The Eastern Suburbs railway line, terminating at Bondi Junction, was opened in 1979.

In February 1983, Bob Hawke, then Australian opposition leader, made a public appearance in Bondi Junction, as part of his successful campaign to become Prime Minister of Australia.

In 1984, Bondi Junction underwent significant development, as the Waverley Council acquired the former Bondi Junction Boot Factory, transforming it into a new community complex.

=== 21st century ===
The suburb was historically divided by the border of Waverley and Woollahra councils. In 2002, the boundary was realigned from Oxford Street to the bypass road (see below), giving Waverley Council full control of the commercial areas of the suburb.

In April 2024, Joel Cauchi perpetrated a mass stabbing at Westfield Bondi Junction before being shot dead by police.

=== Star Theatre ===
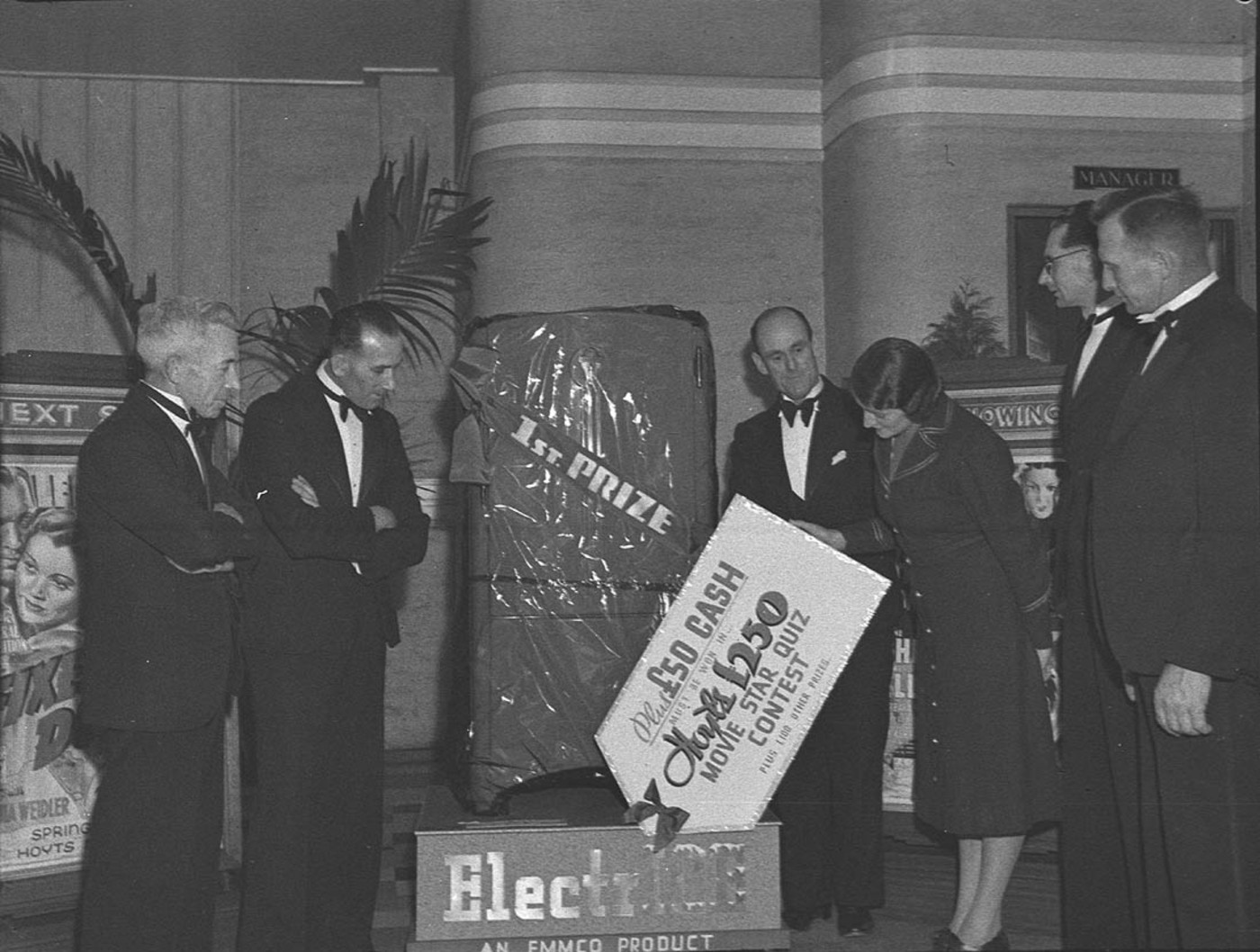
Star Theatre refrigerator display and movie star quiz contest

In 1917 the first theatre in the area, named Star Theatre, was opened, situated on a triangular plot bounded by Bronte Road, Brisbane Street, and Ebley Street. This was demolished 10 years later, and a second Star Theatre opened in 1928. The 2,400-seat theatre was operated by Olympic Theatres until Hoyts purchased it in 1935. Architects Charles Bohringer & Associates (who also remodelled the Enmore Theatre in 1937) redesigned the cinema in an Art Deco style before it was reopened in 1938. It became the largest and most popular cinema in the area, and was at one time one of the biggest suburban cinemas in New South Wales.

In 1954 the Star was equipped with a new CinemaScope screen. It was renamed the Hoyts Horror House for a short period in 1973. Hoyts sold the theatre in 1977, and it closed after Salon Kitty was screened on 8 February 1977.

The building reopened the in 1978 as the Star Rock Concert, and started showing films, but it closed permanently later in the year and was demolished in 1981.

== Transport ==
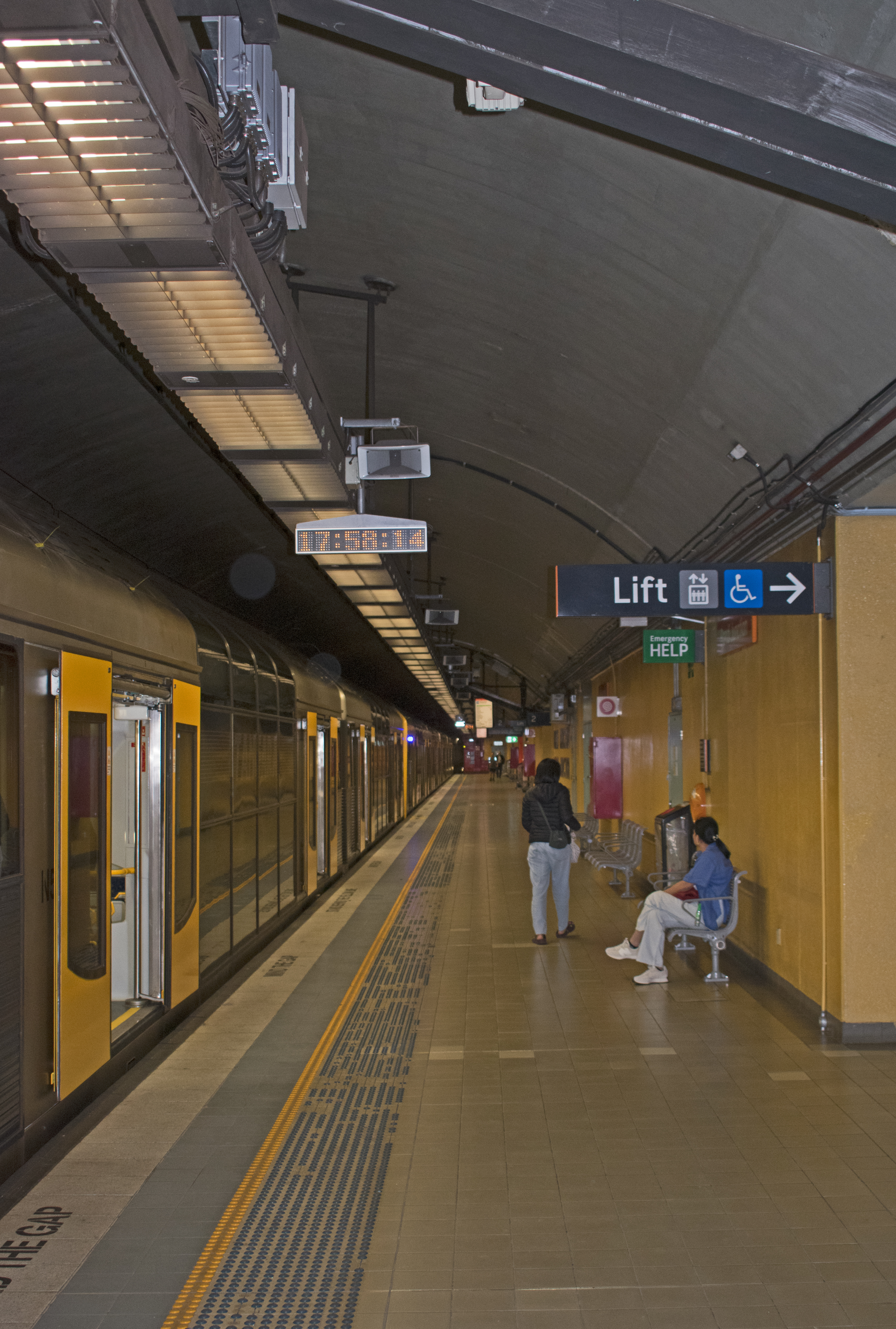
Bondi Junction railway station platforms

Bondi Junction railway station is an underground station that is also the eastern terminus of the Eastern Suburbs railway line on the Sydney Trains network. The station is also the terminus of limited South Coast Line services. A bus interchange is located at ground level, above the railway station and below residential towers.

The Sydney tram network was closed in 1961 and the Waverley Tram Depot converted to a bus depot. This temporarily reduced the traffic problem in the area; but, the rise of the private motor vehicle soon made the problem acute. A railway to Sydney's eastern suburbs was first proposed by John Young, Mayor of Sydney in the 1870s. This was subsequently incorporated into the Bradfield Scheme for improving Sydney's railways. The line was never built as Bradfield envisaged, however.

In 1976, with construction of the railway underway and the NSW Government resolving to actually complete the project as far as Bondi Junction, construction was also begun on an elevated freeway-standard bypass of Bondi Junction. The Bondi Junction Bypass (later renamed Syd Einfeld Drive after the notable local man and one-time Member for Phillip), unlike the railway, was constructed quickly, opening on 6 January 1979. The road runs around the northern side of the business district from Oxford Street at Ocean Street to Oxford Street at Bondi Road and is elevated at about five metres above the ground. It is constructed as a continuous concrete plank bridge. The freeway is, in fact, the only section ever built of a much longer planned road known as the Eastern Freeway, a proposed freeway abandoned in the 1960s, which would have travelled between the Sydney CBD and Bondi.

With the railway opening in June 1979, major changes to traffic flow were made in Bondi Junction. The main thoroughfare, Oxford Street, became devoted to buses only between Adelaide Street and Bronte Road and a pedestrian mall was created between Bronte Road and Newland Street, known as Bondi Junction Mall. The opening of the railway provided the opportunity to rationalise bus services in the Eastern Suburbs, with most city services eliminated or terminated at the new Bondi Junction Bus–Rail Interchange.

In 1998, Woollahra Council, which controlled the site of the bus interchange, finalised an agreement to sell the airspace above the site to Meriton Apartments. Construction began in April 1999 for a new bus interchange and two residential apartment towers of over 70 m high. While this took place, upgrade works were also performed on Bondi Junction railway station. The new interchange was tentatively opened in September 2000 for the Sydney Olympics but subsequently closed for further work. The new bus interchange opened in July 2001.

== Economy ==
=== Retail and shopping ===
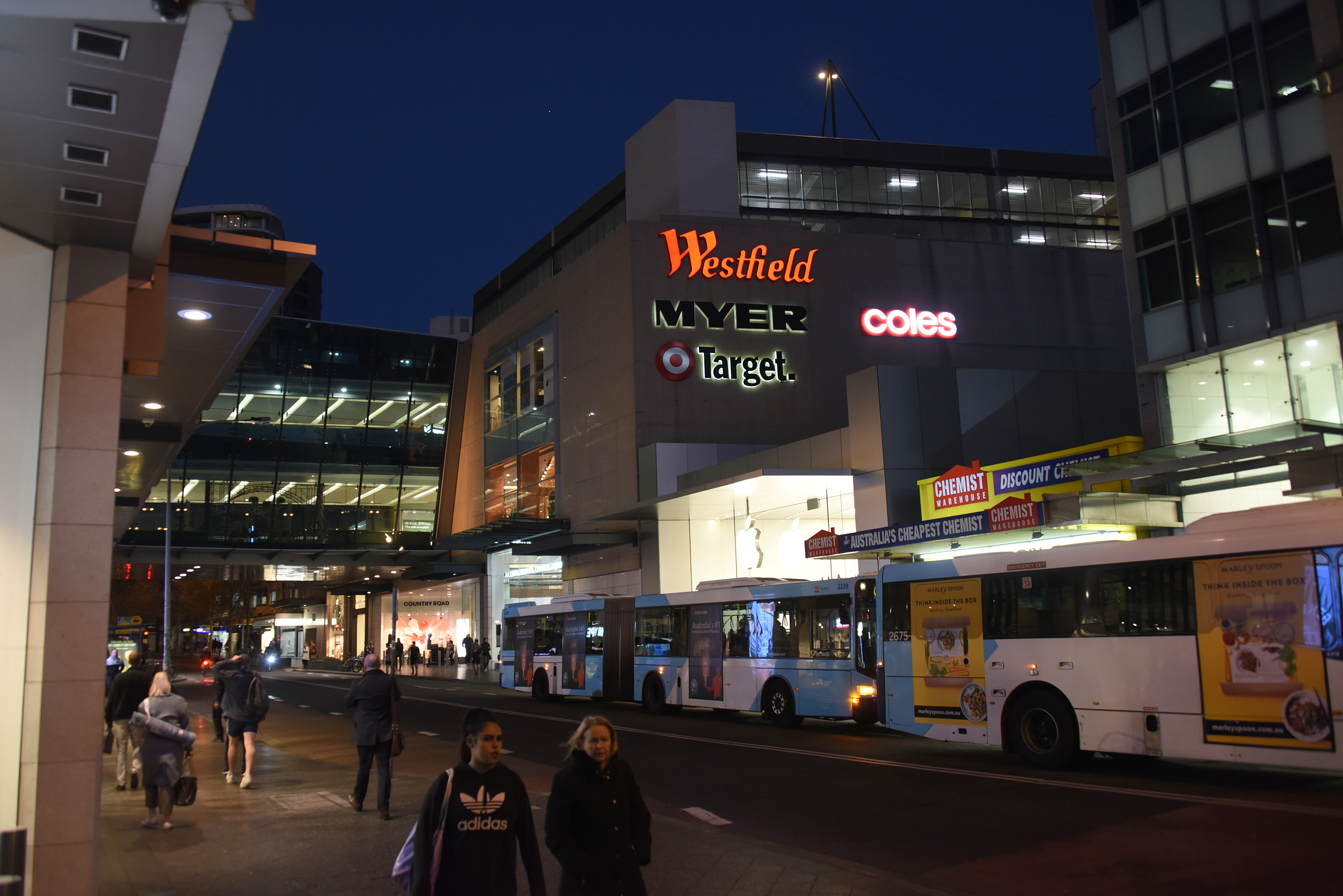
Westfield Bondi Junction

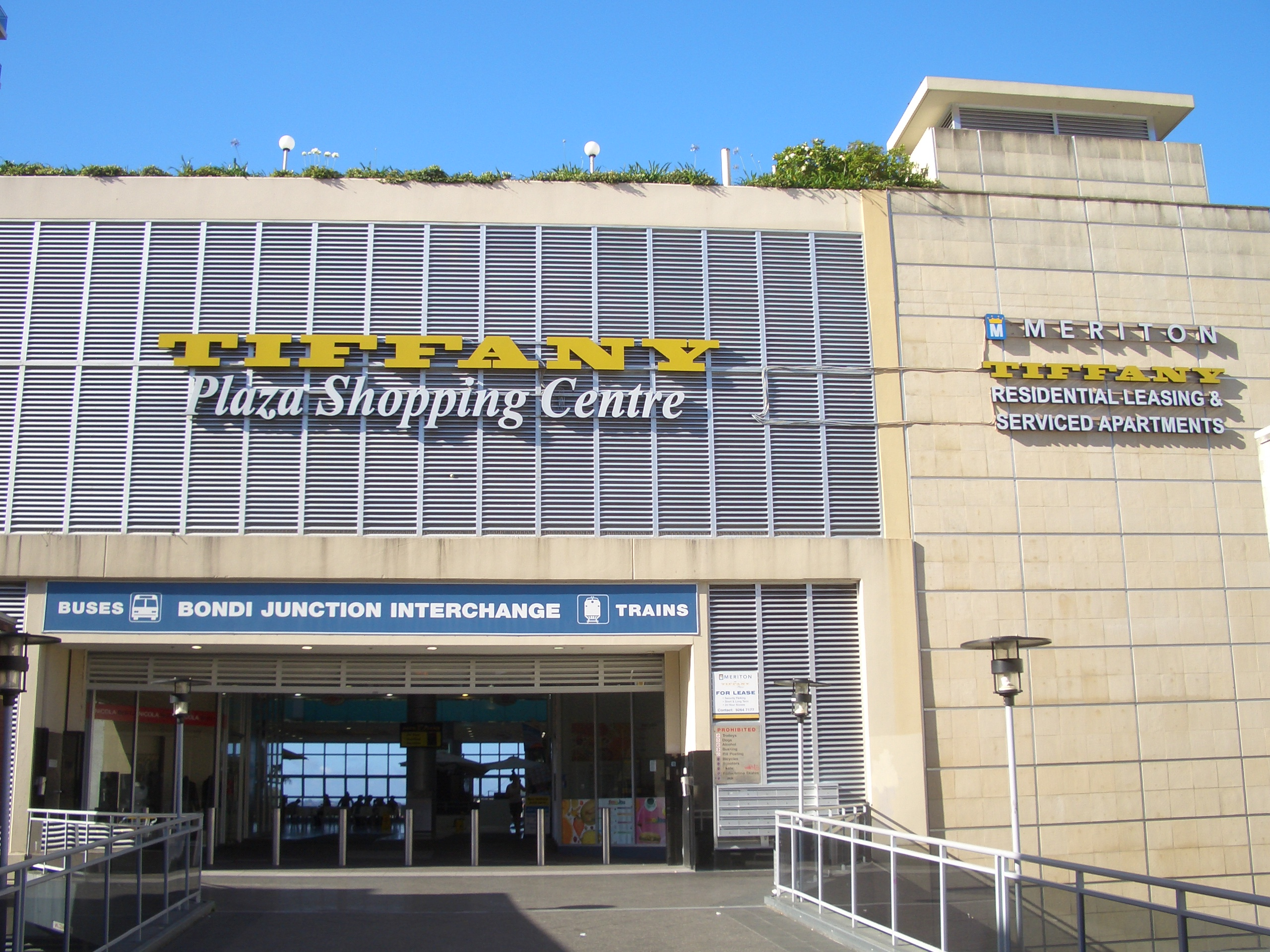
Tiffany Plaza Shopping Centre, above the bus/rail interchange

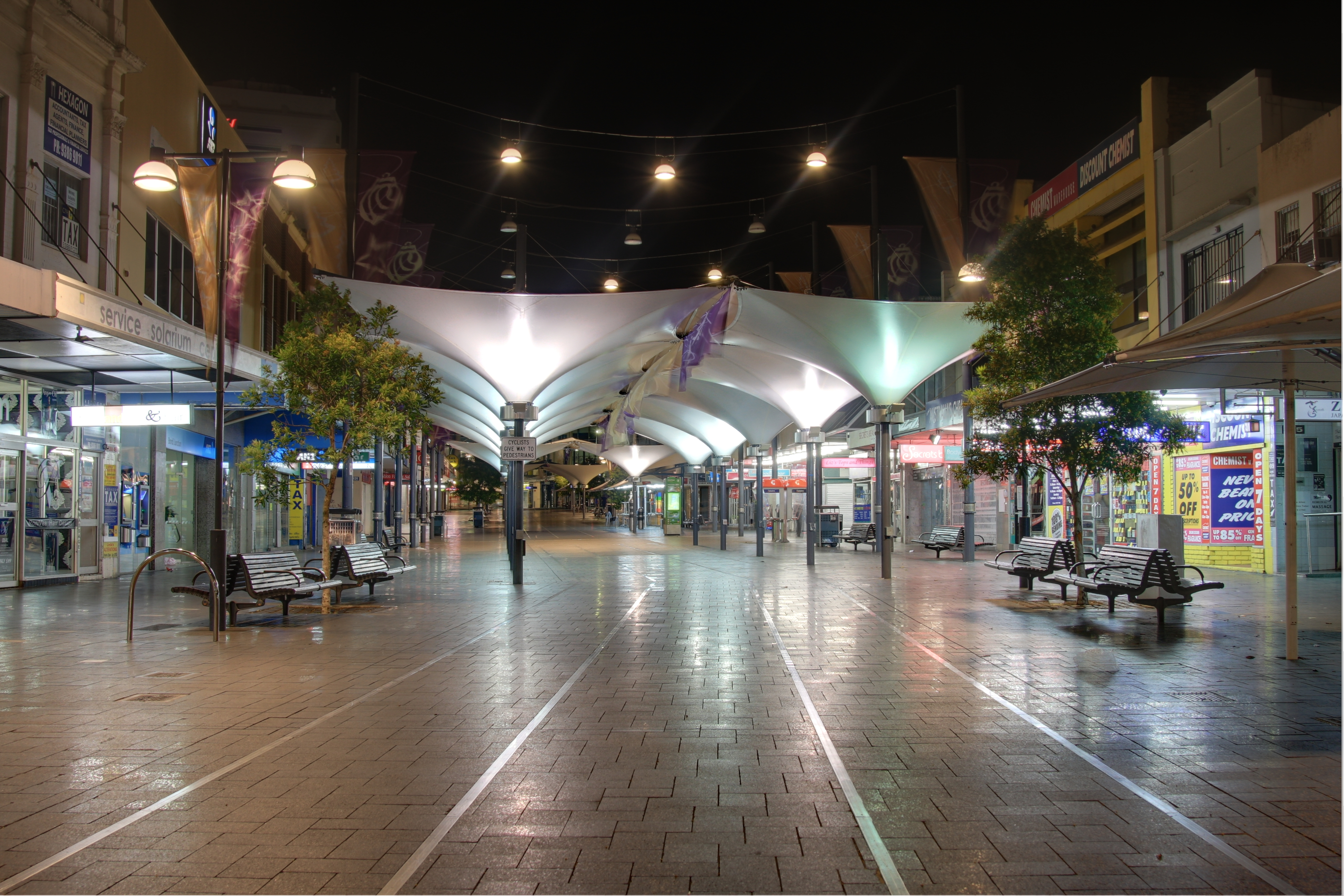
Oxford Street Mall

Westfield Bondi Junction is a major mid to upmarket shopping centre opposite Bondi Junction railway station on the corner of Grosvenor and Oxford Street. There are also two smaller shopping centre nearby, Eastgate Bondi Junction located below the Eastgate residential apartment development and a shopping centre above the station and bus interchange known as Meriton Retail Precinct Bondi Junction. Oxford Street is a major commercial centre in Bondi Junction as it contains numerous businesses including hotels and shops from the York Street end to Old South Head Road. Oxford Street Mall is a pedestrian zone between Bronte Road and Newland Street and contains numerous shops and cafes. There are also shops along Spring Street, Ebley Street and Bronte Road.

=== High-density developments and housing ===
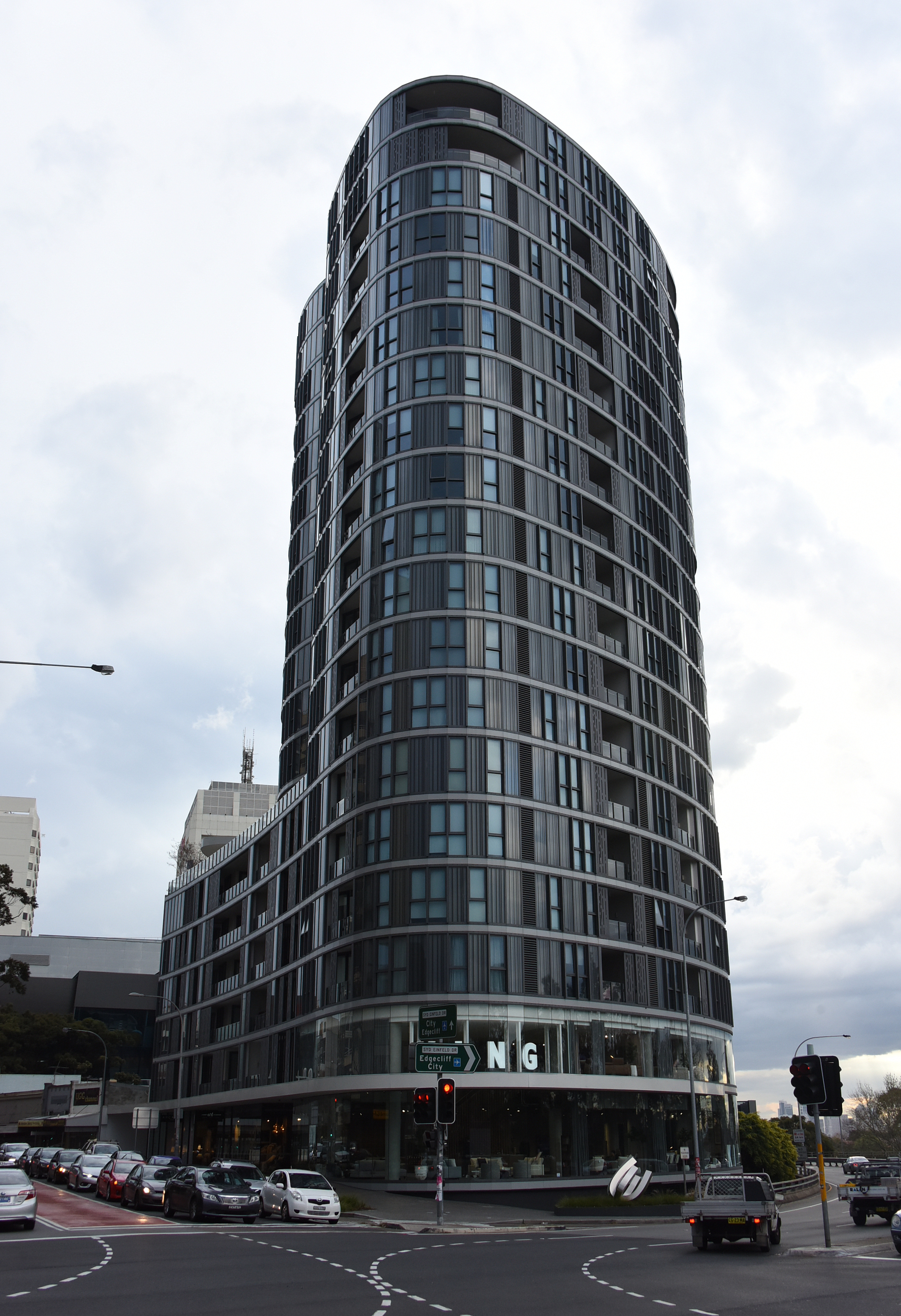
High-density development, Bondi Junction

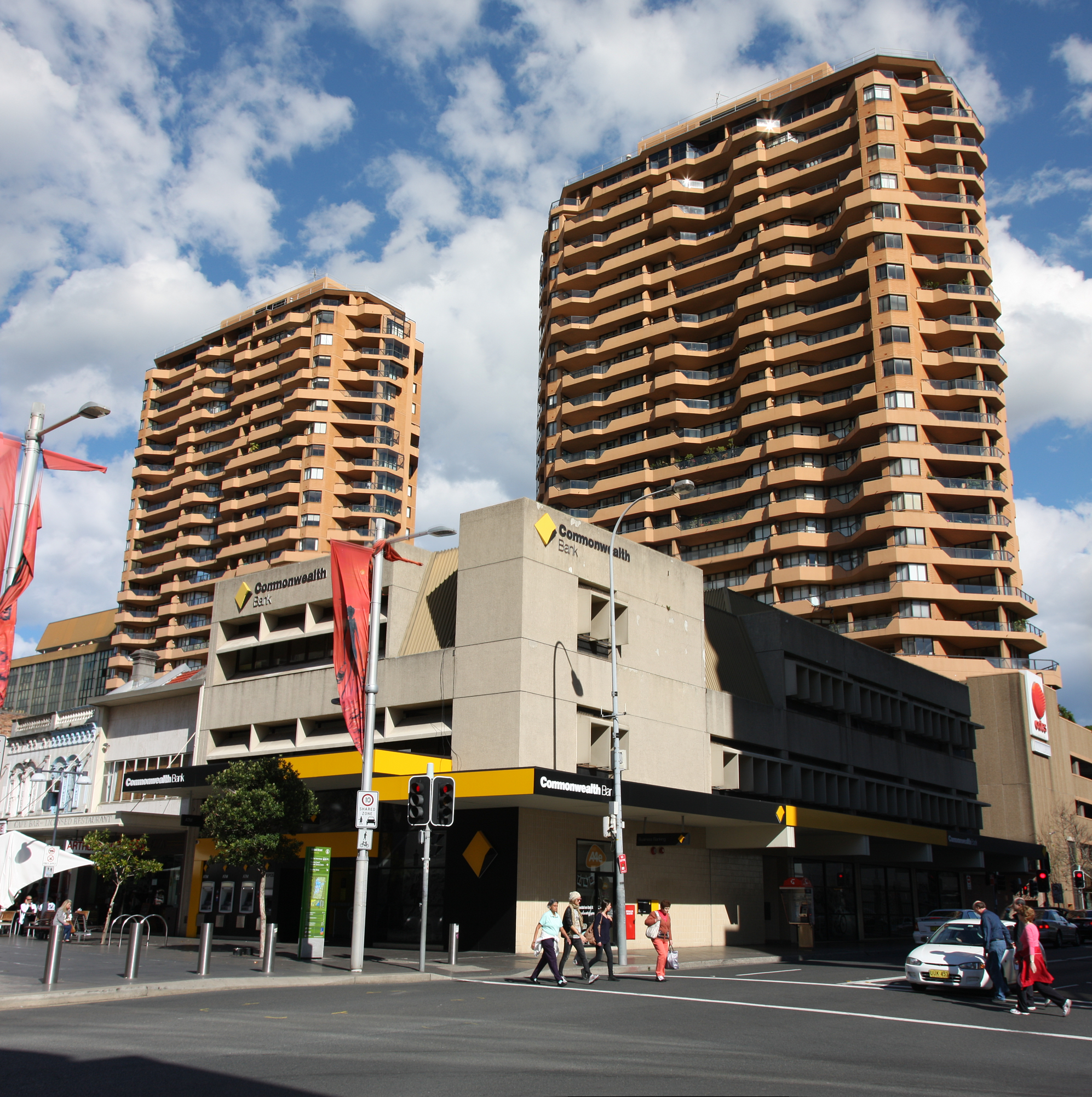
High-density developments and commercial area, Bondi Junction

Bondi Junction is Sydney's fifth largest business district behind the CBD itself, North Sydney, Parramatta and Chatswood. Typical development in the commercial area consists of strip-mall type development two or three levels high. However, over the last 35 years, at least twenty buildings of 12 levels or higher have been constructed including Bondi Junction Private Hospital

The first large development was the Eastern Suburbs Leagues Club (Easts), the local rugby league club for the Eastern Suburbs Roosters.

In the 1980s, following the completion of the Eastern Suburbs Railway, commercial development reached a peak with several office buildings built in the centre of Bondi Junction. By the 1990s, these were mostly displaced by residential developments.

Bondi Junction features high density residential developments close to the commercial centre and low density housing further away. Domestic architecture includes Victorian and Federation designs.

== Demographics ==
According to the 2021 Census, there were 10,361 residents in Bondi Junction. In Bondi Junction, 42.0% of people were born in Australia. The next most common countries of birth were England 9.0%, Brazil 3.8%, Ireland 3.2%, China (excluding SARs and Taiwan) 3.0% and South Africa 2.6%. 64.2% of people only spoke English at home. Other languages spoken at home included Mandarin 3.7%, Portuguese 3.6%, Spanish 3.1%, Russian 2.5% and Italian 1.7%. The most common responses for religion in Bondi Junction were No Religion (41.1%), Catholic (20.6%), Judaism (11.2%) and Anglican (6.4%).

== Sport and recreation ==
Bondi Junction is represented in the National Rugby League by the Sydney Roosters, officially the Eastern Suburbs District Rugby League Football Club (ESDRLFC). The clubhouse of the team is centrally located on Spring Street, Bondi Junction. The Junction is known colloquially to residents in the area as "the home of the Roosters".

== Local landmarks and heritage listing ==
Bondi Junction has many heritage-listed buildings and other items.

Waverley Reservoirs on Paul Street is heritage listed at the state level.

The following are some of the locally heritage listed buildings:

- Italianate home used as community health centre, 26 Llandaff Street
- Ben Eden, Paul Street
- Blair Athol, Woodstock Street
- Euston, Woodstock Street
- Charles Terrace, Denison Street
- Glen Mervyn, Denison Street
- Myall, Mill Hill Road
- Cintra, Mill Hill Road
- Congregationalist Church, Botany Street
- Clementson Park, Ebley Street
- Fingleton Reserve, Waverley Crescent
- Hallena, Waverley Street
- Cotswald Hall, Dalley Street
- Waverley Library
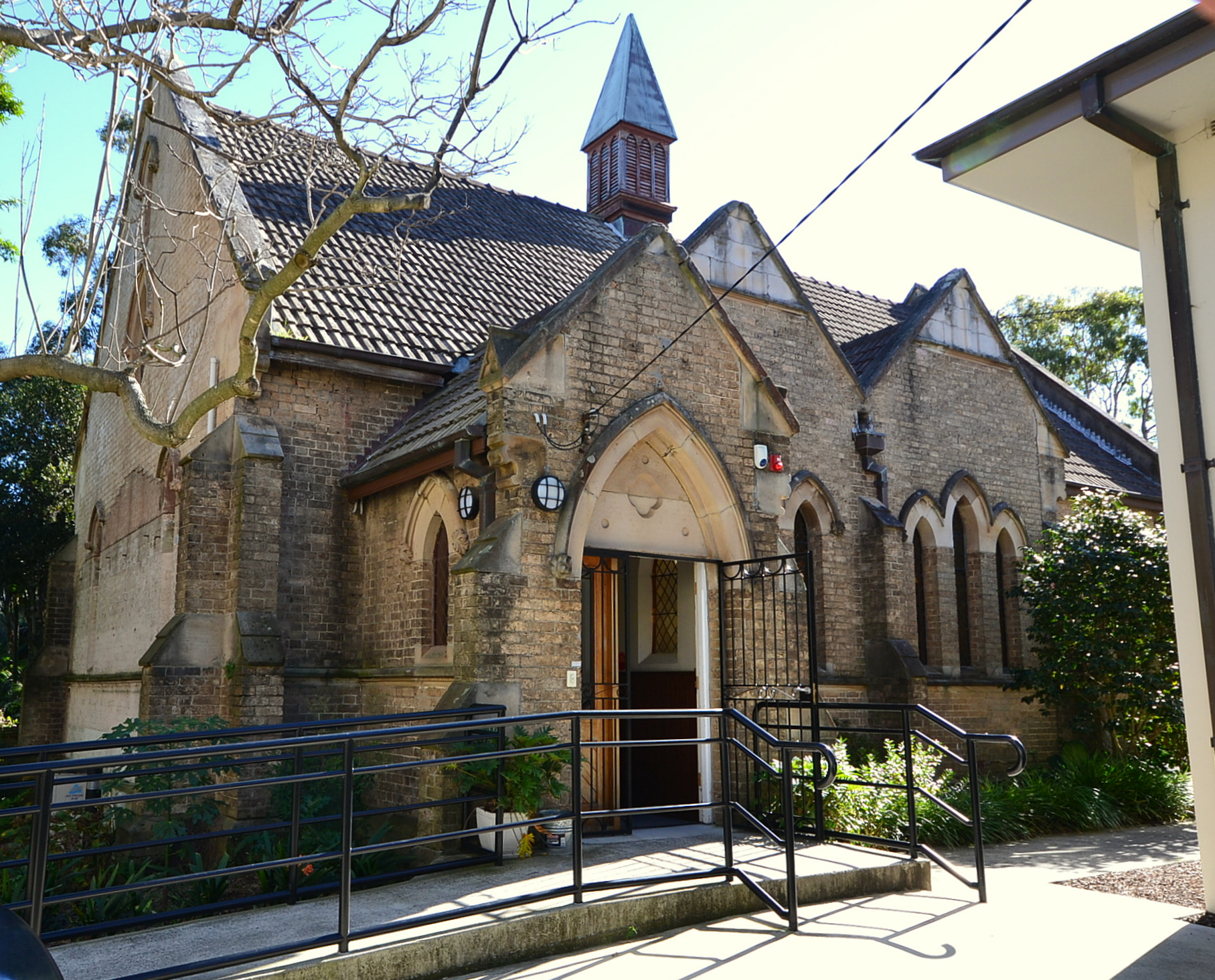
Congregationalist Church, Botany Street

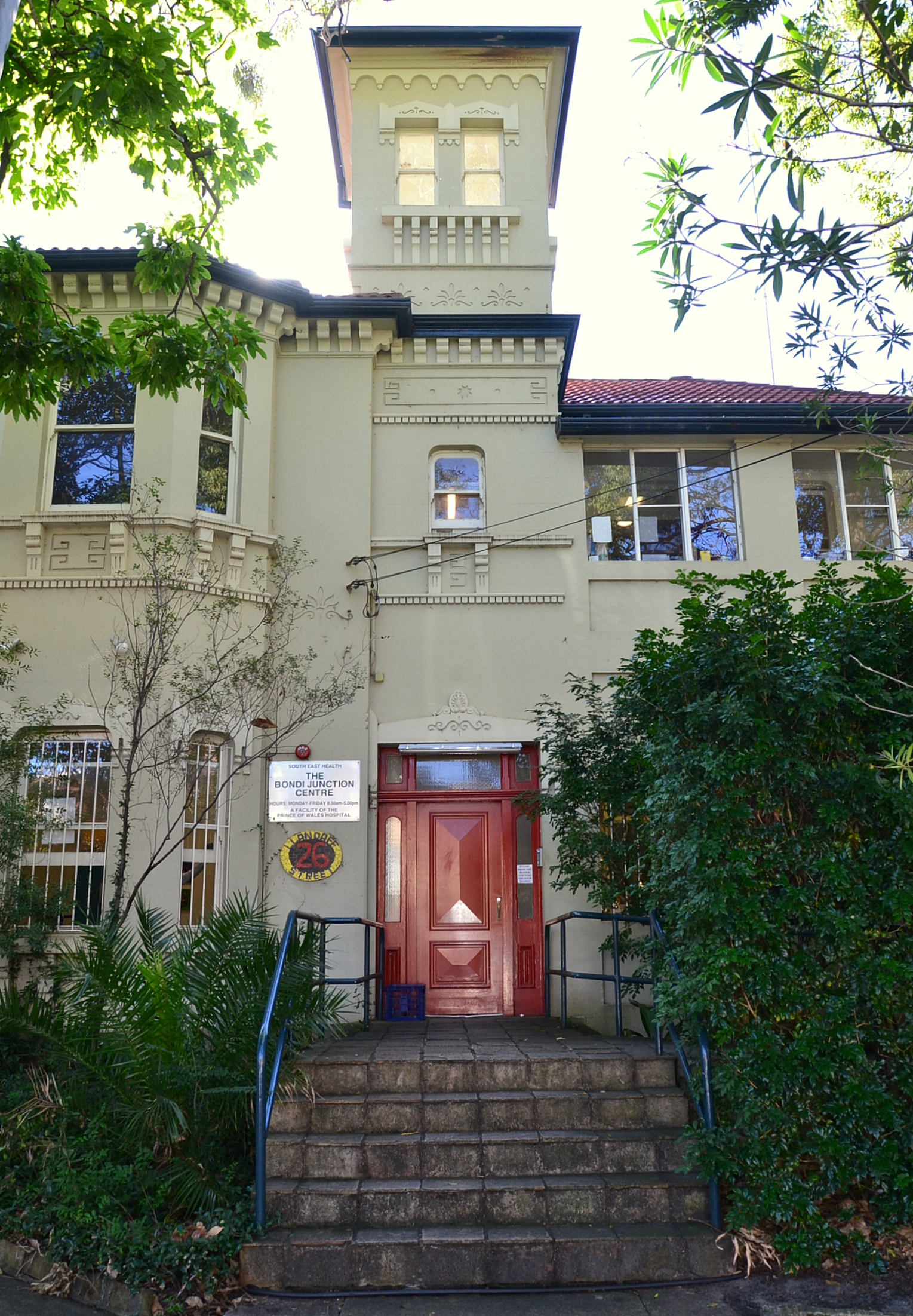
Bondi Junction Community Health Centre, Llandalff Street
