= Waverley, New South Wales =

Waverley
- Suburb
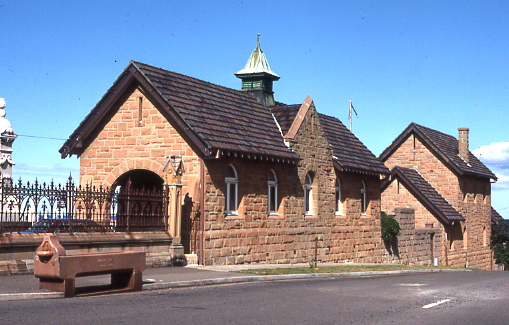
- Waverley Cemetery office building

- Interactive map of Waverley
- Country: Australia
- State: New South Wales
- City: Sydney
- LGA: Waverley Municipal Council
- Location: 7 km (4.3 mi) east of Sydney CBD

Government
  - State electorate: Coogee
  - Federal division: Wentworth
- Elevation: 94 m (308 ft)

Population
  - Total: 4,216 (2021 census)
- Postcode: 2024
Suburbs around Waverley
| Bondi Junction | Bondi | Bronte |
| Charing Cross | Waverley | Tasman Sea |
| Queens Park | Randwick | Clovelly |

Waverley is a suburb in the Eastern suburbs of Sydney, in the state of New South Wales, Australia. Waverley is located seven kilometres east of the Sydney central business district, in the local government area of Waverley Council.

Waverley Council takes its name from the suburb but its administrative centre is located in the adjacent suburb of Bondi Junction, which is also a major commercial centre. Waverley is the highest point of altitude in Sydney's Eastern Suburbs.

== History ==
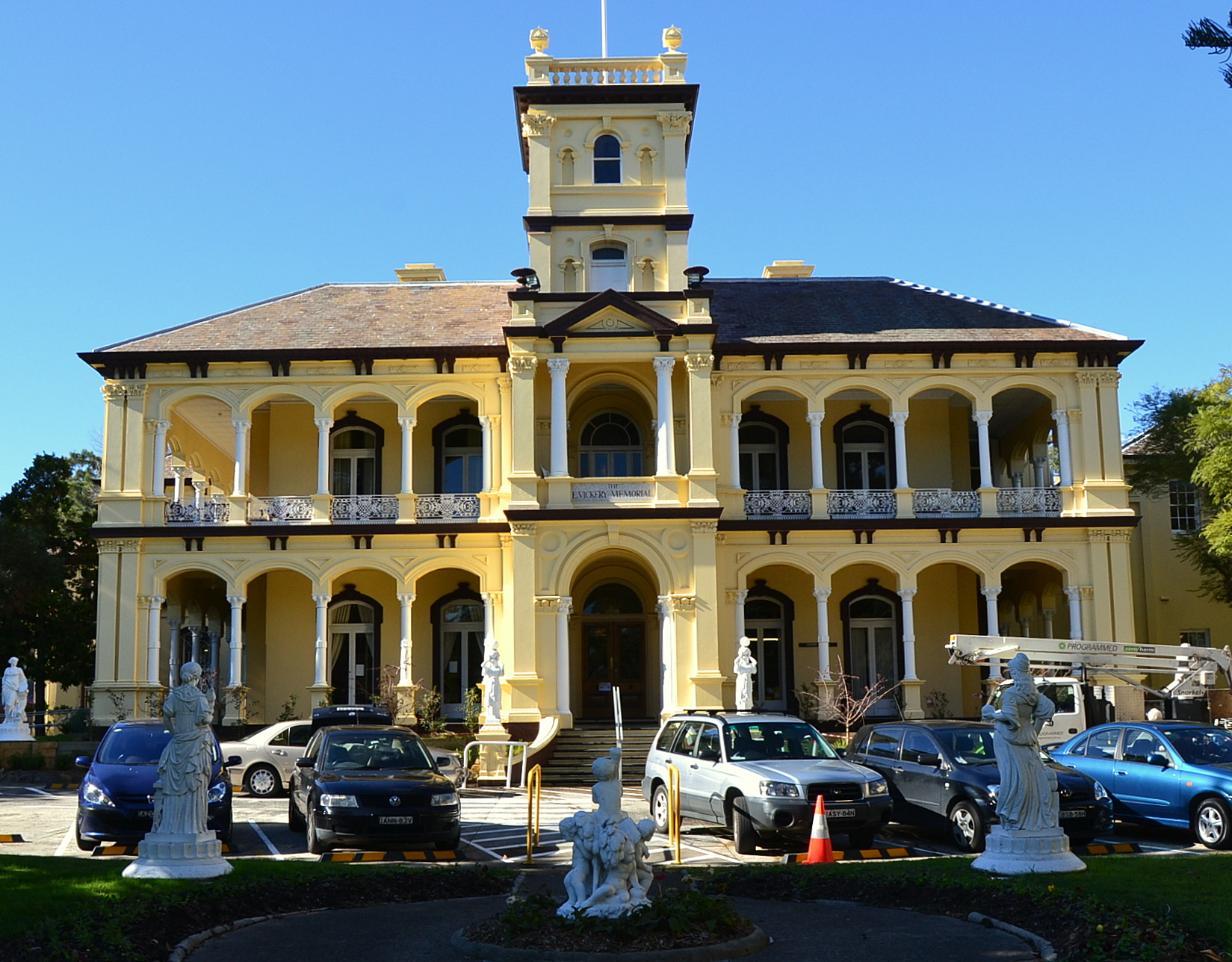
Edina, War Memorial Hospital.

Waverley takes its name from a home built near Old South Head Road in 1827 by Barnett Levey (or Levy) (1798–1837). It was named Waverley House, after the title of his favourite book, Waverley, by author Sir Walter Scott. Waverley Municipality was proclaimed in June 1859. The house was a distinctive landmark and gave its name to the surrounding suburb.

Waverley Cemetery (South Head General Cemetery) was established in 1877 and is one of Australia's most notable cemeteries due to its cliff-side location. The cemetery features the graves of several notable Australians including poet Henry Kendall and aviator Lawrence Hargrave.

Edina, a late Victorian mansion built on a grand scale in Birrell Street by Ebenezer Vickery for himself and his family, was completed around 1884. Vickery was a leading merchant and a prominent patron of the Methodist Church. Other buildings in the group include Banksia, Witchagil and the Nellie Vickery Memorial Chapel. Banksia and Witchagil are two-storey villas that Vickery built for his sons.

This distinguished group of Victorian buildings is now used as the War Memorial Hospital. Edina, Banksia and Witchagil are on the (now defunct) Register of the National Estate. Other heritage items in Waverley include the two weatherboard cottages in Judges Lane, off Bronte Road. A building in Waverley once collapsed into a large hole that swallowed ten houses and an entire street.

In the early 1960s, local authorities and women in Waverly were said by local media to be having “the bikini war”. After over 50 women were arrested on Bondi Beach one weekend that year, a 1935 ordinance requiring bathing suits to meet certain measurements was dropped later that year, replaced by requiring “proper and adequate” swimsuits.

== Heritage listings ==
Waverley has a number of heritage-listed sites, including:

- 240 Birrell Street: St Mary's Anglican Church, Waverley
- 45 Victoria Street: Mary Immaculate Catholic Church, Waverley, designed by John Hennessy in 1912. Its twin-towered design is said to be reminiscent of the Italian Renaissance and is an example of the Federation Academic Classical style.
- Victoria Street, Presbyterian Church (Jubilee Church currently) was designed by Sydney architects Messrs Nixon and Allen. The foundation stone was laid by Mrs. Grahame on 8 May 1897.
- Victoria Street, the Catholic Friary was demolished in 1985 after sustaining extensive fire damage (see gallery below).

== Population ==
In the 2021 Census, there were 4,216 people in Waverley. 58.1% of people were born in Australia. The most common countries of birth were England 8.9% and New Zealand 2.9%. 75.3% of people only spoke English at home. The most common responses for religion were No Religion 40.3% and Catholic 25.0%.

== Commercial area ==
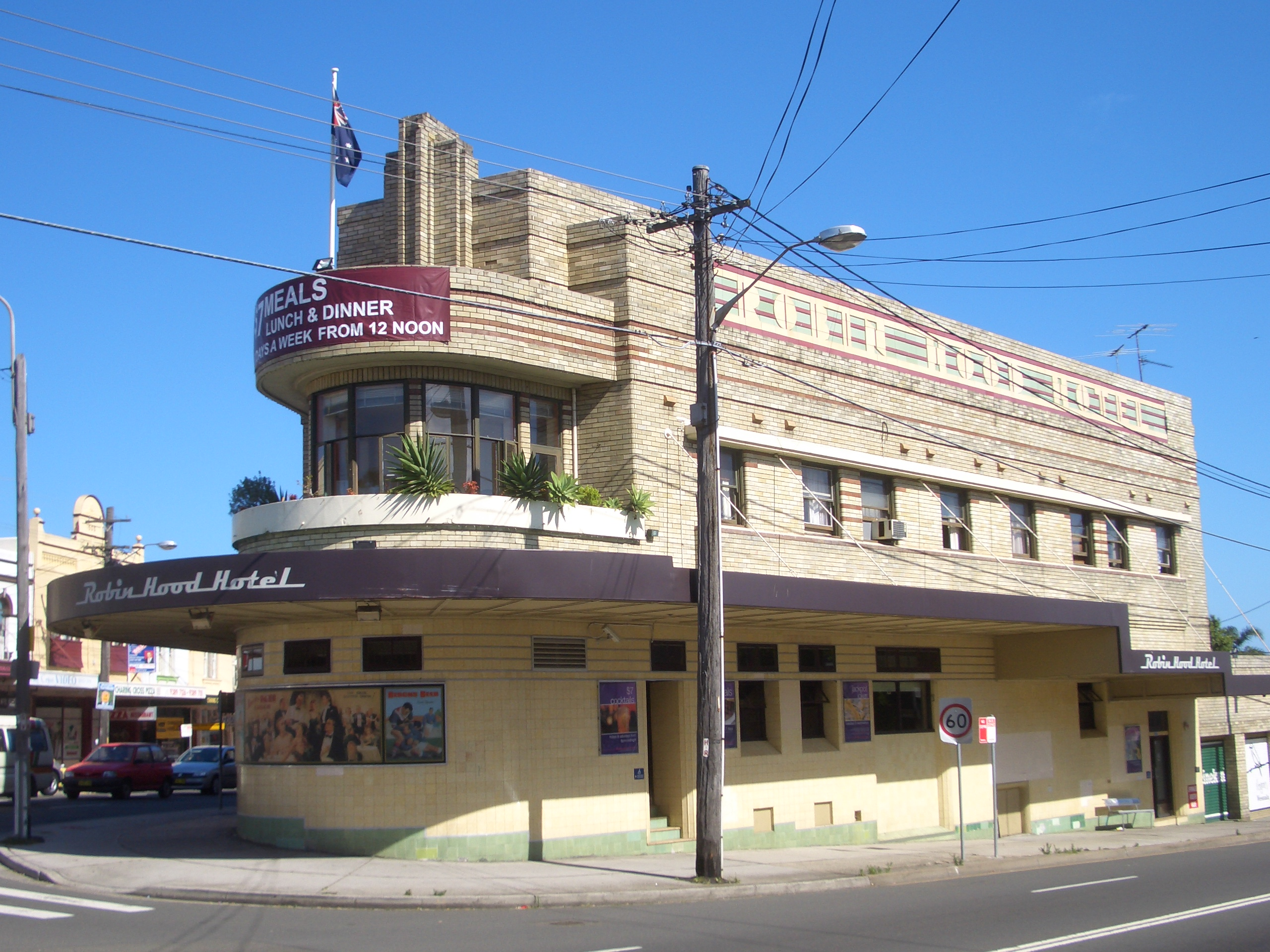
Robin Hood Hotel, an Art Deco style structure

Waverley is mostly residential with a scattering of commercial developments, centred on the road junction known as Charing Cross.

== Schools ==
Waverley is home to a number of schools including Waverley Public School (state primary), the suburb includes:

- Waverley College is a Christian Brothers school for boys made up of Our Lady's Mount Campus in Birrell Street, (Senior School Years 7-12), Waterford Campus in Henrietta Street (Junior School Years 5–6) and Waterford Pre School.
- St Catherine's School is an Anglican, Day and Boarding school for girls, located in Albion Street.
- St Clare's College is a Catholic, high school for girls in Church Street.
- St Charles' Primary School, Waverley. A Catholic primary school next door to St Clare's.

== Sport and recreation ==
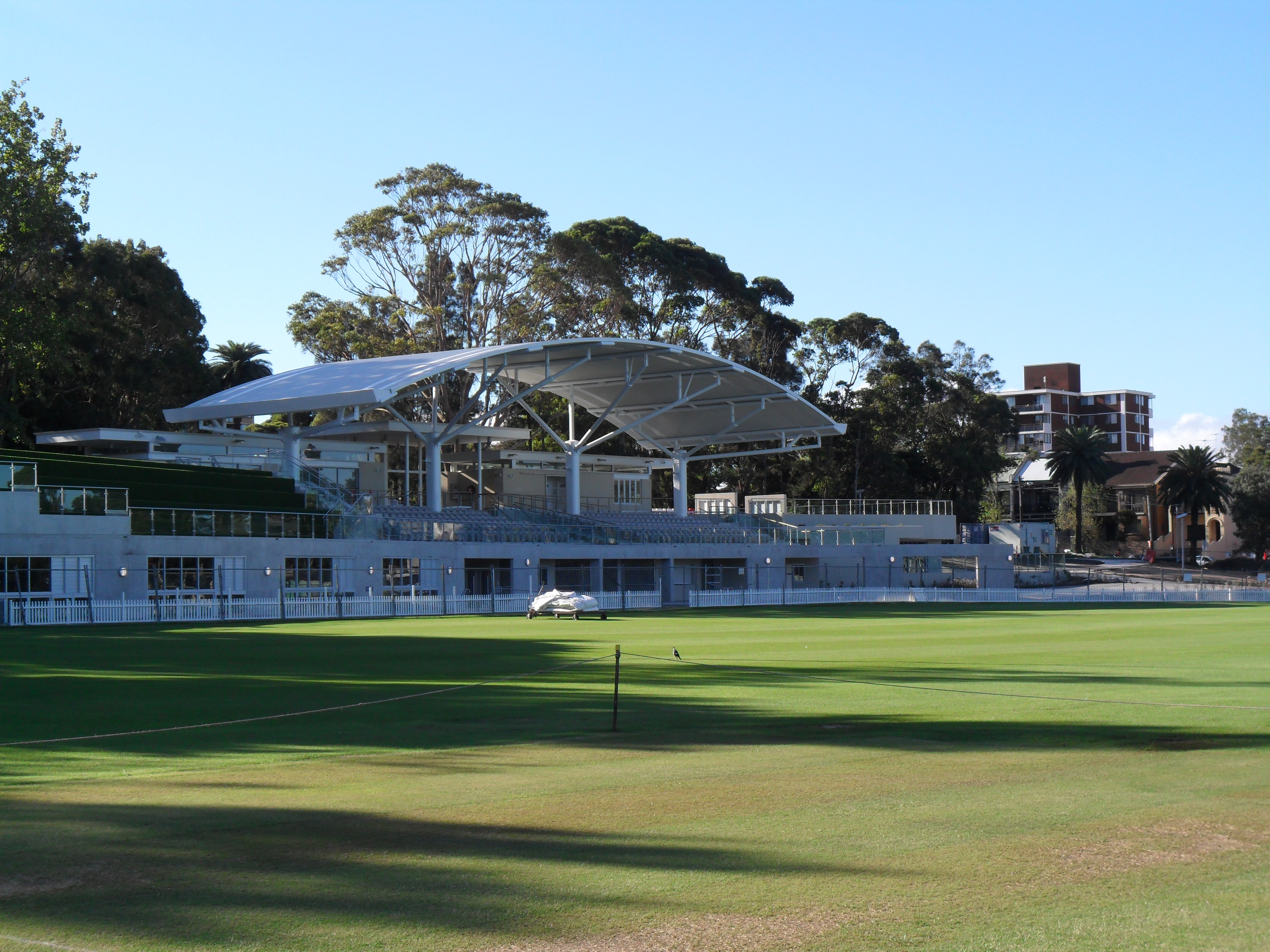
Waverley Oval

Waverley is represented in one of the most popular sporting competitions across Australia, the National Rugby League competition, by the local team the Sydney Roosters, officially the Eastern Suburbs District Rugby League Football Club (ESDRLFC).

The following clubs are located in or represent the Waverley area:

- Sydney Roosters Rugby League Club (based at the Eastern Suburbs Leagues Club, in Bondi Junction).
- Waverley Rugby Club - Rugby Union
- Eastern Suburbs Cricket Club
- Bondi United - Rugby League
- Waverley Bowls Club
- St Charles Waverley - Rugby League
- * Waverley Old Boys Football Club - Football (Soccer)
- Waverley Amateur Radio Society - The oldest continuously licensed amateur radio club in Australia. The society was founded in Waverley in 1919 and is now located in nearby Rose Bay

== Notable people ==
Current and former notable residents include:

- Barney Wilson, a cinematographer and creative director working within the Australian film industry.
- Millicent Armstrong (1888–1973), born in Waverley, was a playwright and farmer who wrote primarily about the experiences of country life in early 20th century Australia.
- Susan Cullen-Ward (1941–2004), Crown Princess of Albania.
- Queen Mary of Denmark (née Mary Donaldson) (born 1972), a resident of Porter Street near Bronte Road, and formerly involved in Eastern Suburbs real estate before her marriage to then Crown Prince Frederik.
- Reg Lindsay (1929–2008), country music star. Lindsay was born in Waverley.
- Pakie Macdougall was born here in 1875. She was a leading figure of the art scene in Sydney in the 1930s
- Princess Michael of Kent (born 1945)
- Scott Morrison (born 1968), 30th Prime Minister of Australia (2018–2022). Morrison was born in Waverley.
- Elizabeth Julia Reid (1915–1974), born in Waverley, was a Catholic journalist and Grail movement leader.
- Bob Windle, gold medalist in the 1500m freestyle at the 1964 Summer Olympics. Windle spent his formative years in the suburb.

== Gallery ==
Schools and churches

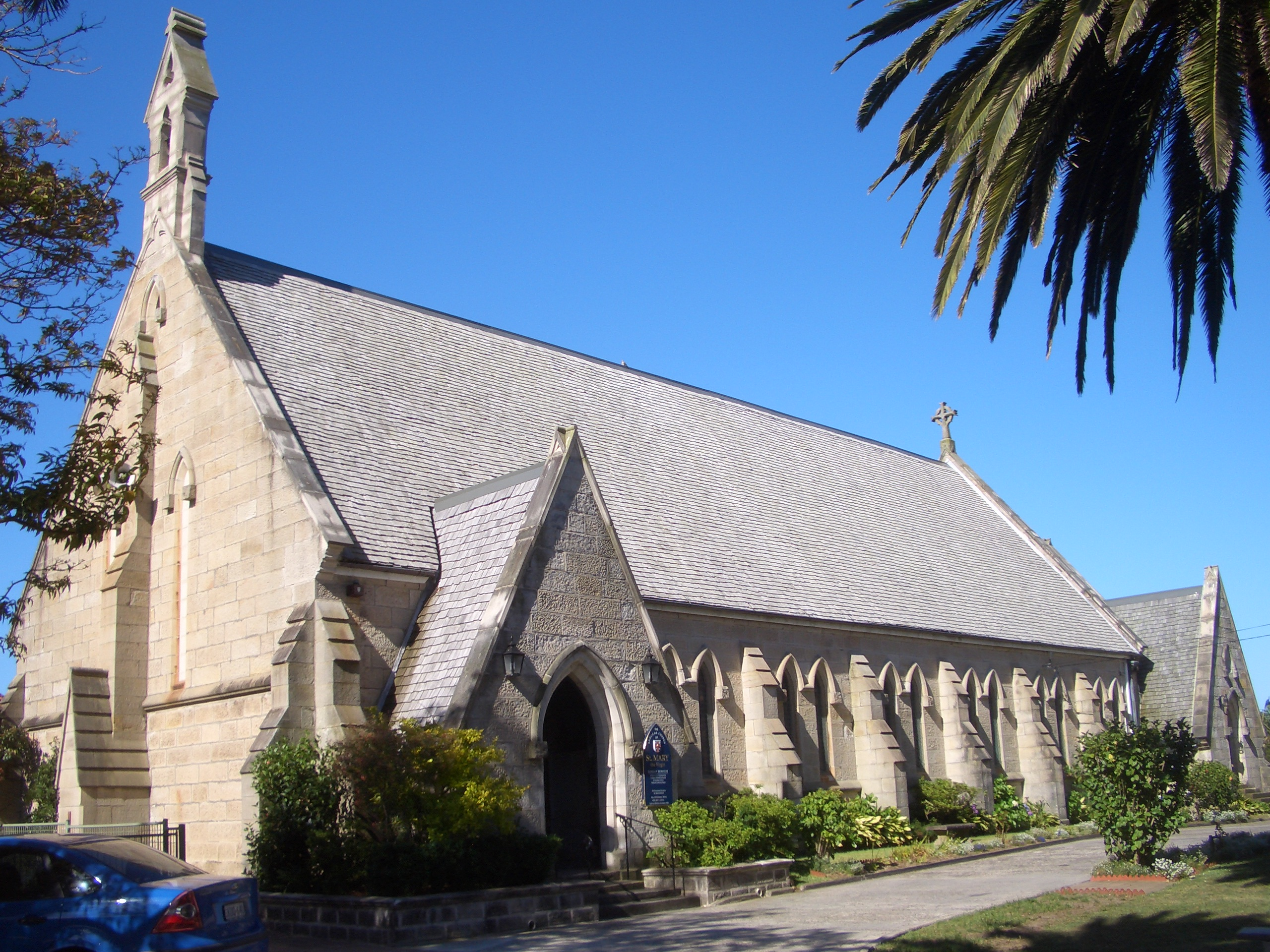
St. Mary's Anglican Church

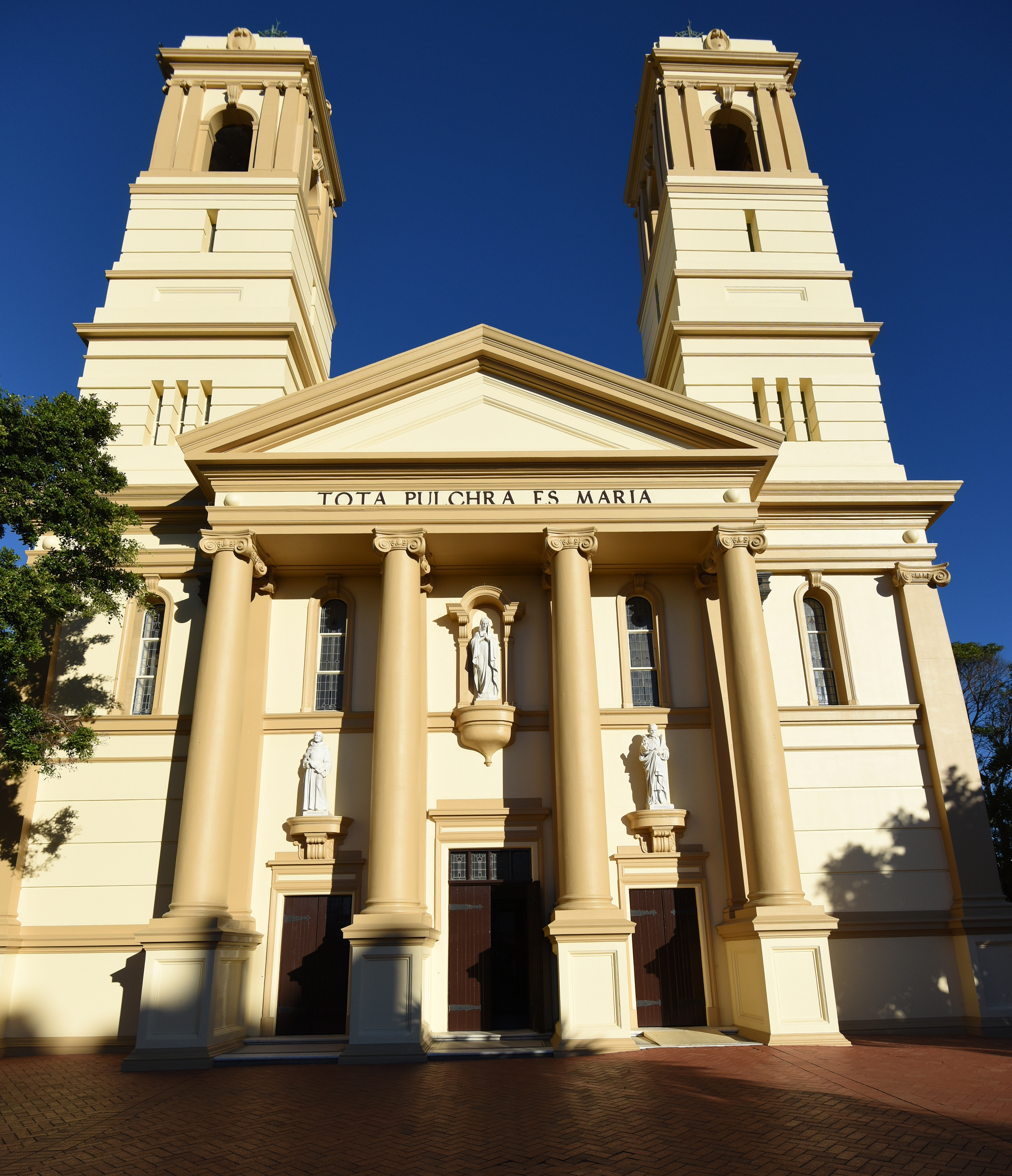
Mary Immaculate Church

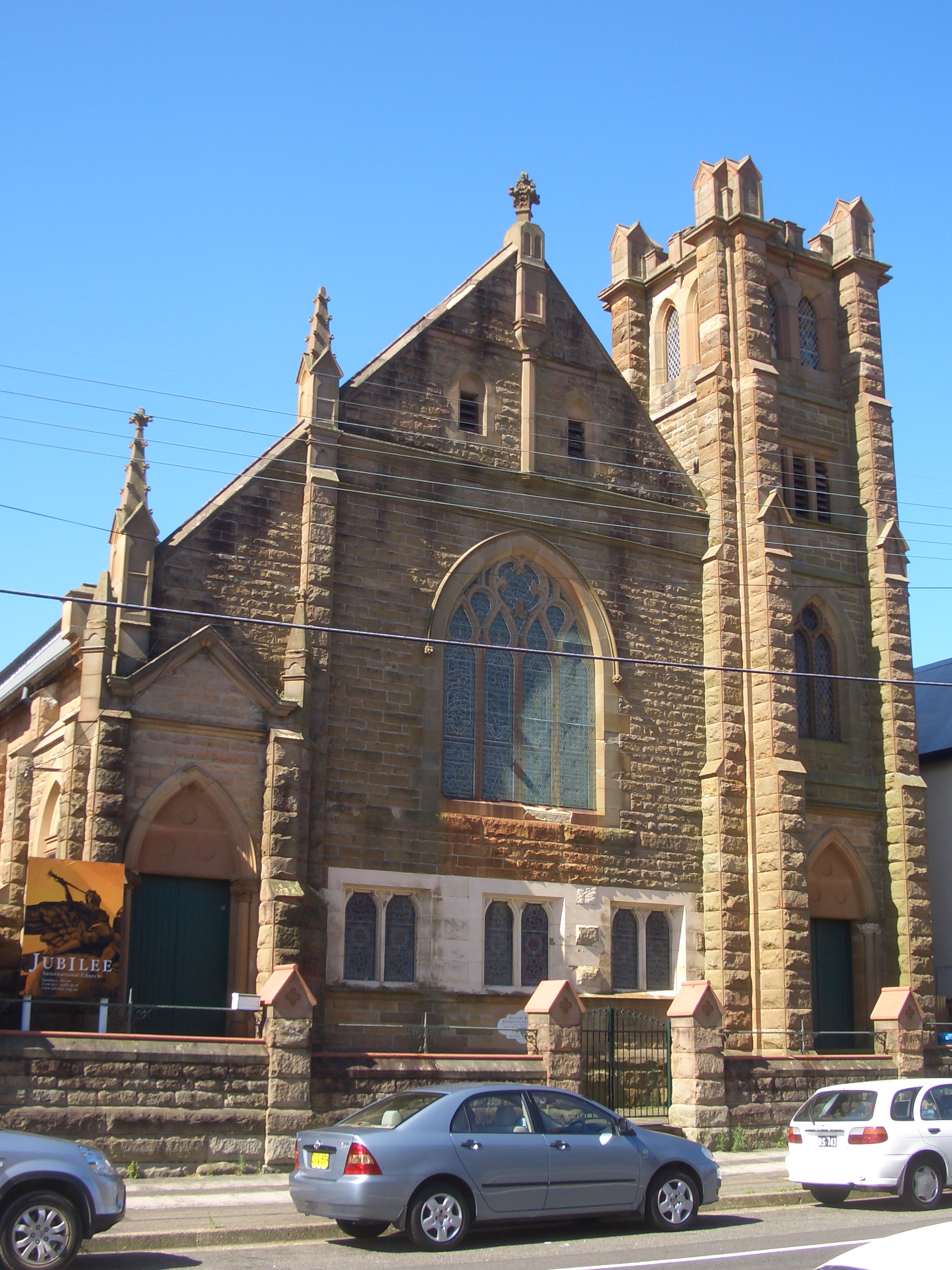
Jubilee International Church (formerly Presbyterian Church, 1897)

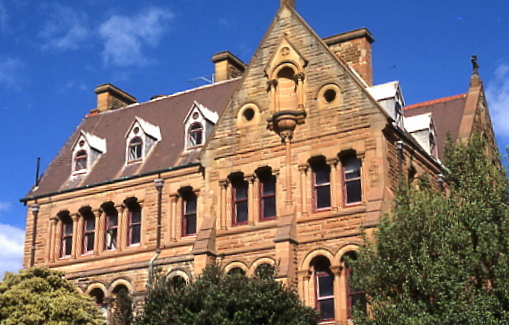
Catholic Friary, Victoria Street, before demolition in 1985

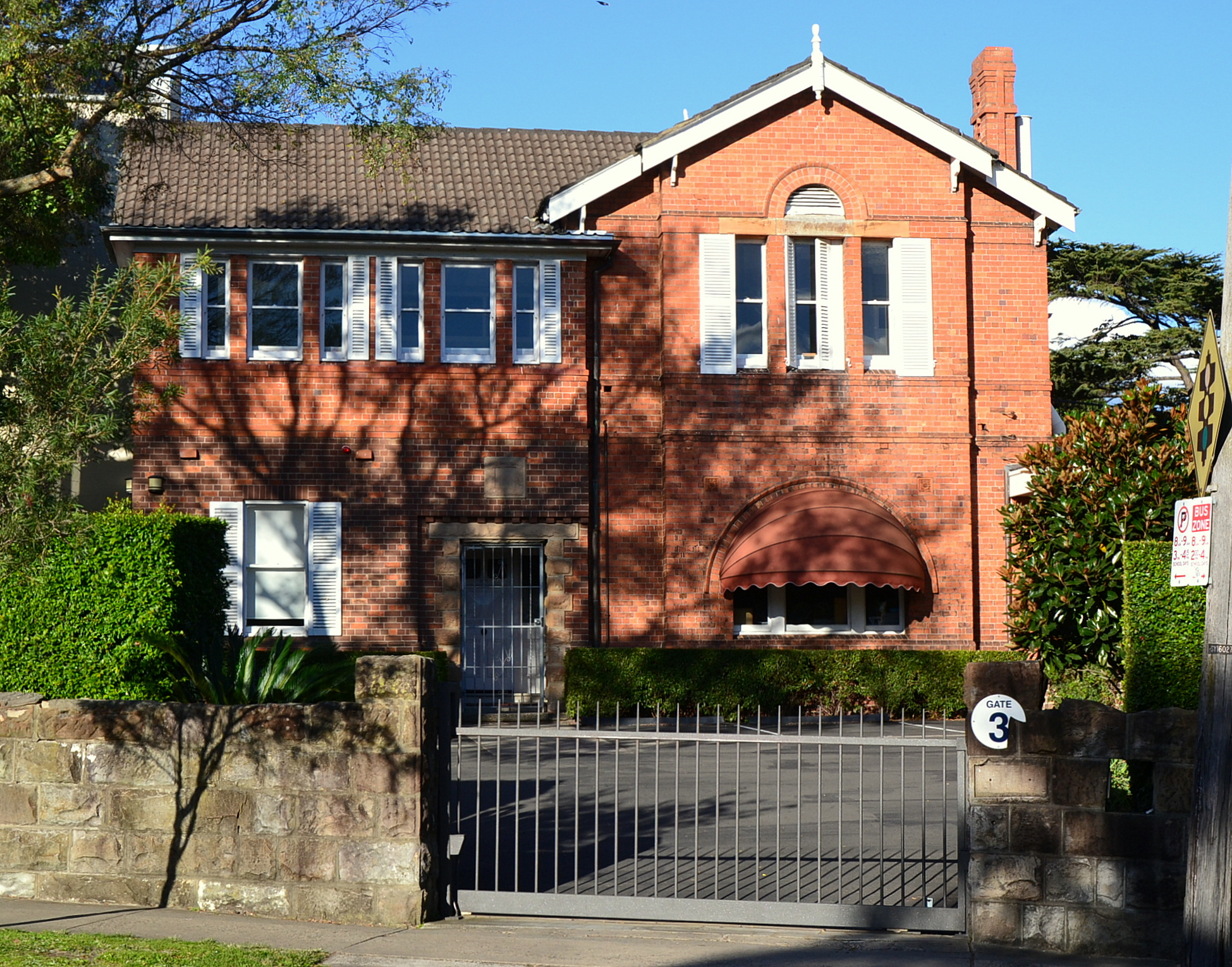
Former home (c.1891) acquired by St Catherine's School in 1957

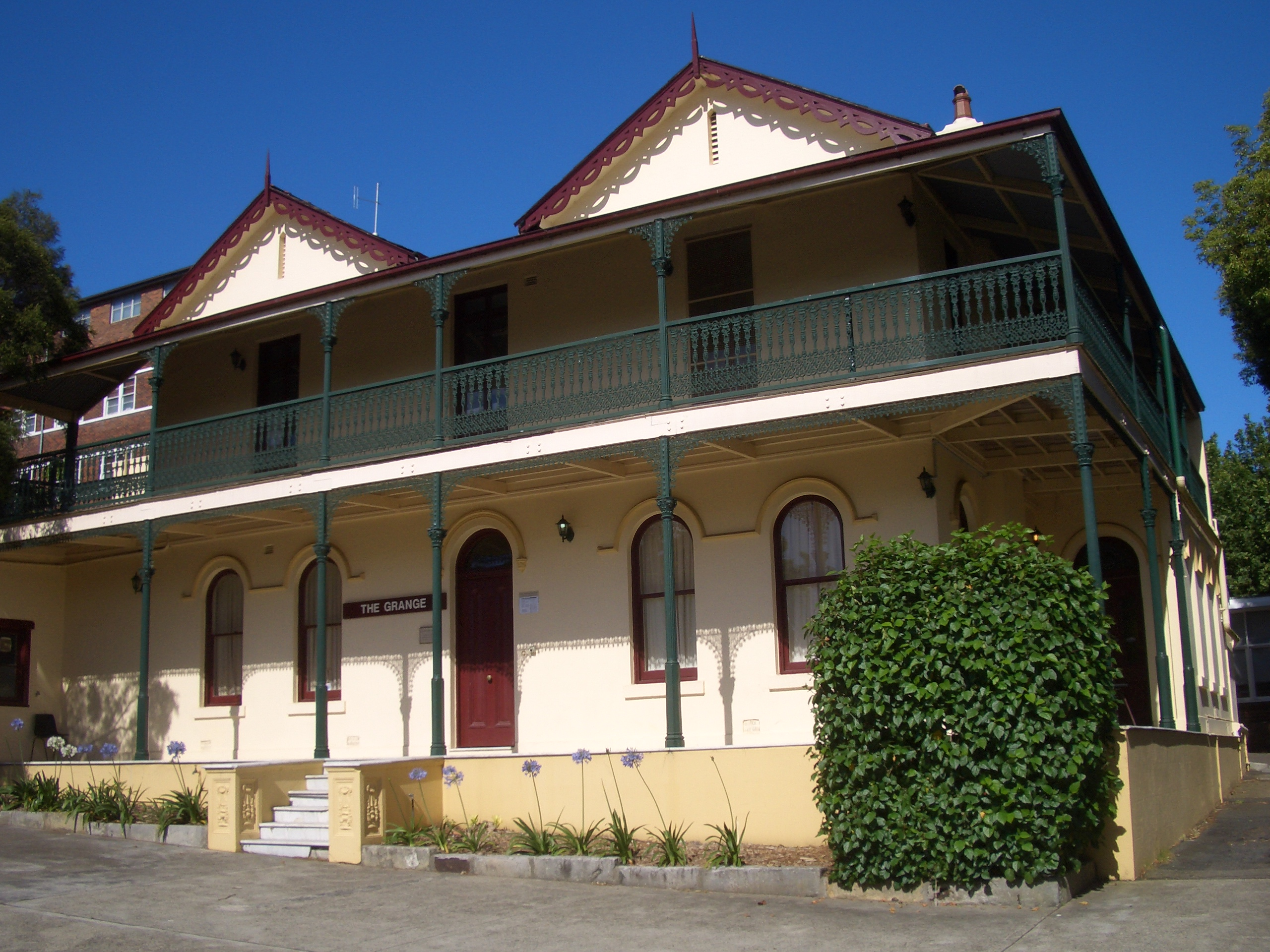
The Grange, Waverley College

== Local landmarks ==
Heritage-listed items in the Waverley area include the following:

- Mary Immaculate Church group, Victoria Street
- St Marys Anglican Church and pipe organ, Birrell Street
- Waverley Reservoir No.1, Paul Street
- Avondale, St Marys Avenue
- War Memorial Hospital group of buildings, Birrell Street
- Bronte Public School, Hewlett Street
- Bronte View, St Thomas Street
- Cadore, Henry Street
- Carthona, Birrell Street
- Chapel, St Clares Convent, Carrington Road
- Char Nez, Brown Street
- Charing Cross hotel, Carrington Road
- Moana, Gardyne Street
- Simpson Park, Macpherson Street
- Sonoma, Bronte Road
- Stone buildings, Waverley Cemetery

== Beaches ==
Waverley has a coastline that stretches 7.5 km and is mostly surrounded by cliffs and headlands that are made up of 220 million year old Hawkesbury sandstone. Waverley has 3 main beaches and some other unpatrolled spots. Bondi Beach, Bronte Beach and Tamarama Beach are all main beaches whereas beaches like Mackenzies Bay are unpatrolled beaches.
