= Australian five-dollar note =

Current denomination of Australian currency

Five Dollars
- Value: 5 Australian dollars
- Width: 130 mm
- Height: 65 mm
- Security features: Window, Shadow image
- Material used: Polymer
- Years of printing: Pale Mauve – 1992–1993; Revised – 1995–1998, 2002–2003, 2005–2008, 2012–2013, 2015; Commemorative – 2001; Next Generation – 2016–present

Obverse
- Design: Queen Elizabeth II; Acanthorhynchus tenuirostris; Acacia verticillata
- Designer: emerystudios
- Design date: 1 September 2016

Reverse
- Design: Parliament House, Canberra; Commonwealth Star; Federation Pavilion
- Designer: emerystudios
- Design date: 1 September 2016

The Australian five-dollar note was first issued on 29 May 1967, fifteen months after the currency was changed from the pound to the dollar on 14 February 1966. It was a new denomination with mauve colouration – the pre-decimal system had no denomination with a value of £2 1/2. The first polymer version of the note was introduced on 7 July 1992. A major design update was issued on 1 September 2016, with a minor update to the signatures in 2019.

== Series ==
- The first issue was a paper note which had a gradient of mauve, with a distinct black overprint. It was designed by Gordon Andrews, with Russell Drysdale as the Reserve Bank of Australia's artistic advisor. It featured portraits of Sir Joseph Banks and Caroline Chisholm, as well as elevations of Sydney streets from Joseph Fowles' "Sydney in 1848", the cover of the Shipping Gazette, a watercolour of the Waverley, and a handbill of a meeting of the Family Colonization Loan Society. All of these images were sourced from the State Library of New South Wales.
- The first polymer banknote issue, which can be recognised for its mauve colouration and numeral font, was first issued in pale mauve on 7 July 1992. A number of people found it difficult to distinguish it from the $10 banknote, especially in poor lighting conditions.
- In 1995, a second polymer issue was issued on 24 April, that year, distinguishable by its deeper shade of mauve and a different font for the numeral.
- A federation commemorative was issued on 1 January 2001 until 4 years later. Notes featured Sir Henry Parkes on the obverse and Catherine Helen Spence on the reverse.
- On 1 September 2016, Next Generation Banknote (NGB) $5 was issued. The NGB series banknotes contain more security features than the previous series, including a clear top-to-bottom window.

== Statistics ==
According to Reserve Bank statistics, at the end of June 2017 there were two hundred and eleven million five dollar banknotes in circulation, fourteen percent of the total banknotes in circulation; worth one thousand and fifty five million, or one percent of the total value for all denominations. Coombs/Randall has the greatest value, issued for two years only; and the 1990 Fraser/Higgins being issued for less than a year.

From 1967 to 1974, the title identifying the country was "Commonwealth of Australia" and there were 195,504,000 of these notes issued. The title identifying the country was then changed to "Australia" and from 1974 until the end of the issuance of paper currency for this denomination (in 1992), 978,068,318 of these notes were issued.

== Design ==
On the 1995 design, Queen Elizabeth II, Queen of Australia at the time was on the obverse, along with eucalyptus (gum) leaves. There is a number 5 in the right hand corner of both sides. The word "Australia" is written to the bottom left of the Queen. Parliament House appears on the reverse. On the 2001 commemorative design, Sir Henry Parkes appears on the obverse and Catherine Helen Spence on the reverse.

On 12 April 2016, the Reserve Bank of Australia announced a new design for the 5-dollar banknote would be introduced into circulation on 1 September 2016, the fourth polymer $5 banknote issued since 1992. It is the first of a new series of banknotes that will feature a different species of Australian wattle and a native bird. The 5-dollar banknote has the prickly Moses wattle (Acacia verticillata subsp. ovoidea) and the eastern spinebill (Acanthorhynchus tenuirostris). It also features an image of the Federation Pavilion. The reverse features Parliament House, showing the mosaic forecourt designed by Kumantje Jagamara, called Possum and Wallaby Dreaming, as well as a plan of Parliament House.

The 2016 design was slightly updated in 2019, with new signatures for the Governor of the Reserve Bank and the Secretary to the Treasury.

After the death of Elizabeth II, the Reserve Bank of Australia said that it was discussing with the government before it decides the replacement portrait on the 5-dollar banknote. On 2 February 2023, the Reserve Bank of Australia announced that King Charles III will not appear on the new five-dollar banknote; a design celebrating First Nations peoples will appear instead. The federal Parliament House will continue to be included.

== Security features ==
The paper design included a watermark of Captain James Cook in the white field. The same watermark was also used in the last issue of pound banknotes. A new feature of the decimal currency was metallic strip embedded within the paper of the note, first near the centre of the note, then from 1976 moved to the left side on the obverse of the note.

The polymer issue includes: a shadow image of the Australian coat of arms which is visible under other printing when the note is held up to light; a pointed star with four points on the obverse and three on the reverse that come together under light; a clear window that has a stylised gum flower showing; and raised print and micro printing of the denomination value.

Some features of the banknote glow under UV light. These features include the serial number and a square patch on the reverse of the note. There is also raised printing around the portraits and major design elements of the note which can be felt by rubbing the finger or fingernail against them.
