= A. verticillata =

A. verticillata may refer to:

- Acacia verticillata, the prickly Moses, prickly-leaved wattle, star-leaved acacia or whorl-leaved acacia, a perennial tree species
- Allocasuarina verticillata, the drooping sheoak, a nitrogen fixing tree species native of southeastern Australia
- Alzatea verticillata, a flowering tree species native to the Neotropics
