= Prickly Moses =

Prickly Moses is a common name for several plants and may refer to:

- Acacia brownii, endemic to eastern Australia
- Acacia farnesiana
- Acacia hubbardiana, native to north eastern Australia
- Acacia pulchella, endemic to western Australia
- Acacia ulicifolia, native to Australia
- Acacia verticillata, native to south eastern Australia
