= Sydney Mechanics' School of Arts =

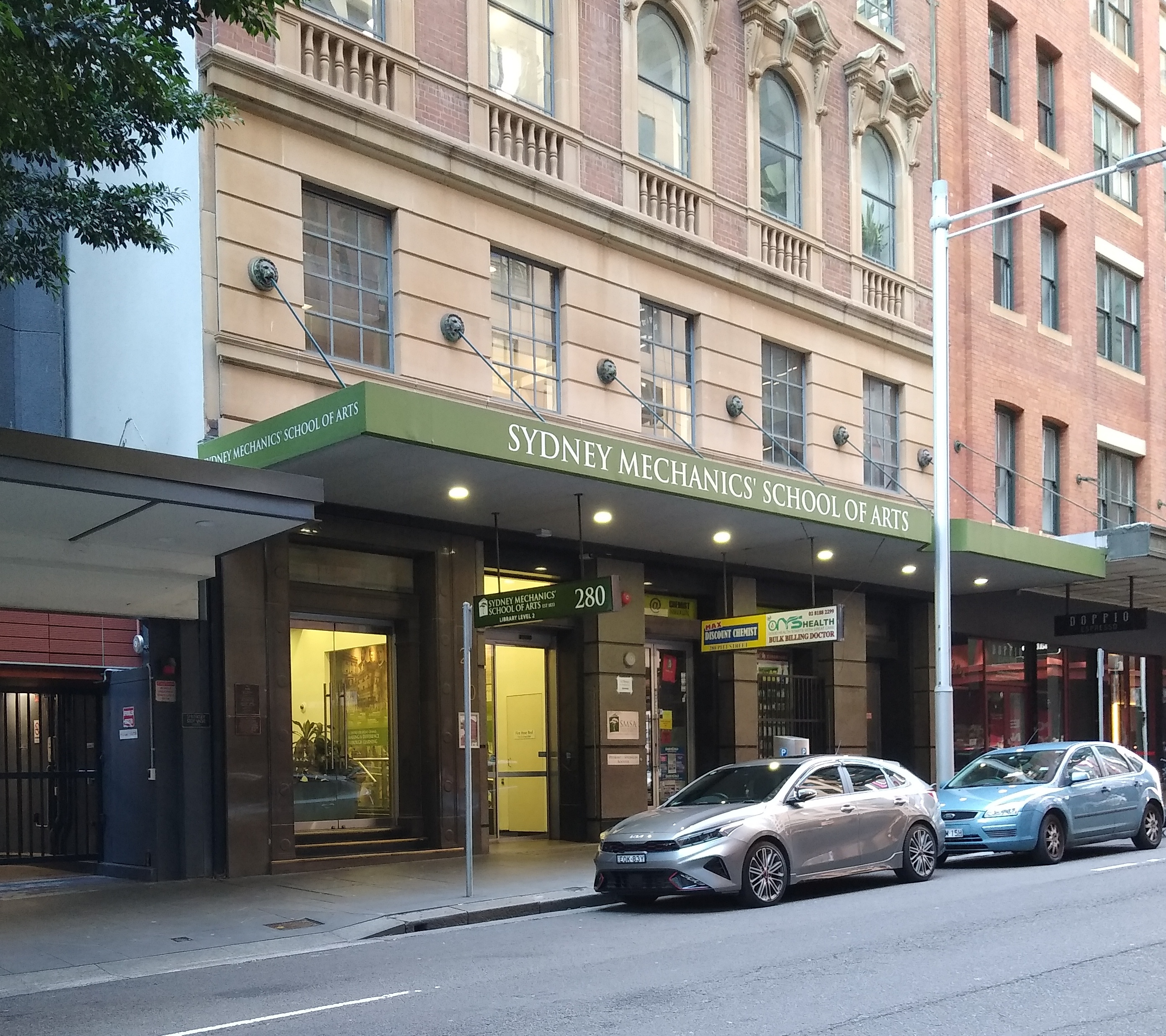
- Sydney Mechanics' School of Arts, pictured in 2022

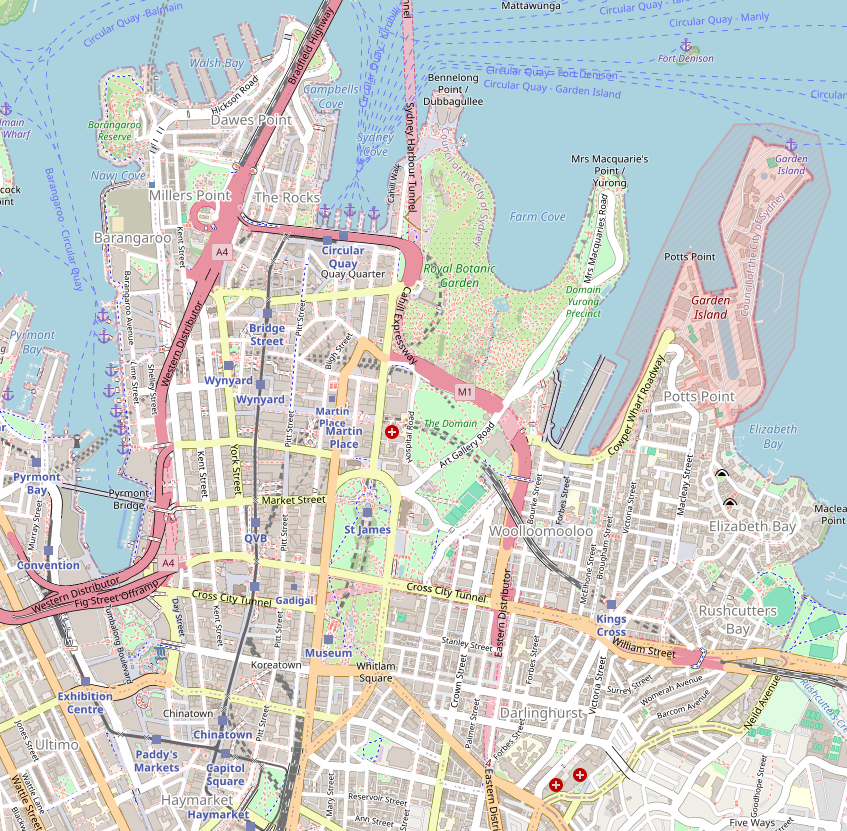
- Location in Sydney central business district
- Abbreviation: SMSA
- Formation: 1833; 193 years ago
- Founder: Henry Carmichael
- Type: Non-profit
- Location: 280 Pitt Street, Sydney, New South Wales, Australia
- Coordinates: 33.87418°S 151.20818°E
- Services: Adult education
- Website: smsa.org.au

The Sydney Mechanics' School of Arts (SMSA) is the longest running School of Arts (also known as a "Mechanics' Institute") and the oldest continuous lending library in Australia. Founded in Sydney in 1833, the school counted many of the colony's educated elite as members. It ran a program of public lectures, courses, and other activities based on its mission of adult education. It also set up a lending library which became the oldest continuously-operating lending library in Australia.

After selling its former home at the heritage-listed building at 275 Pitt Street known as the Sydney School of Arts building in 1996, it renovated and moved into the building known as Lincoln House at 280 Pitt Street. In 2011, the SMSA opened the Tom Keneally Centre, which holds the research collection of world-renowned author Thomas Keneally from his private collection and memorabilia.

== History ==
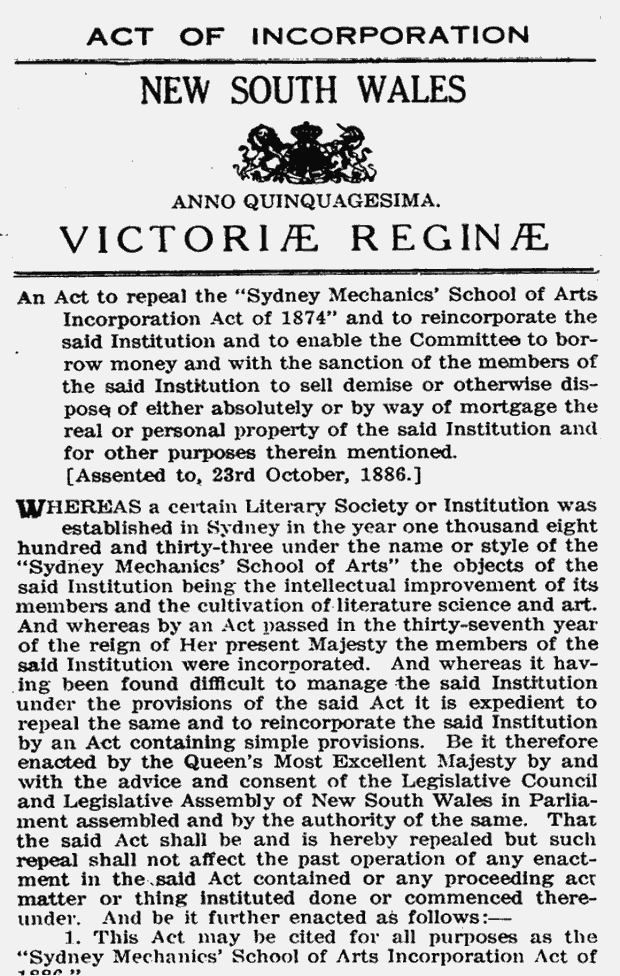
SMSA Act of incorporation, 1886

By the early 1830s, Sydney Town had come a long way from its origins as a convict colony four decades earlier and free settlers were increasing in numbers. John Dunmore Lang wished to build an Australian College in Sydney and sent Henry Carmichael to recruit craftsmen in Scotland. On the return journey in 1831 aboard the Stirling Castle Carmichael gave classes to some of these men. They formed the nucleus of a Mechanics' Institute when they arrived in Sydney.

Mechanics' Institutes were a recent phenomenon – the first one had been set up in Scotland in 1821 – and their aim was the intellectual improvement of their members, through the diffusion of scientific and other useful knowledge, and the cultivation of literature, science and art. While it still had some 21,000 convicts, the free and freed population of Sydney was growing, and assisted immigration was helping to create a new society. The establishment of a legislative council to advise the Governor of New South Wales brought responsible government a step closer. Businessmen with a social conscience set up "civilising" institutions such as the Savings Bank of NSW in 1832. The following year the Sydney Mechanics' School of Arts was founded after a meeting on 22 March between Carmichael with Surveyor-General Major Thomas Mitchell and Dr Charles Nicholson who "...resolved to found an institution similar to those established in England by Dr. Bricbeck, Dr. Ure, and other distinguished promoters of popular education."

The aim was to pursue further education for working men through public lectures and classes, and the establishment of a library. The colonial administration of Governor Richard Bourke soon recognised the efforts of the School of Arts and provided a land grant and a small annual subsidy to support its work. In 1836, aided by various philanthropists, the school was able to lease vacant land at 275 Pitt Street, and the inaugural lecture was given on 4 April 1837 by Carmichael, followed by a chemistry demonstration by Nicholson. The establishment includes a lending library, which became the oldest continuously running lending library in Australia.

A certain Literary Society or Institution was established in Sydney in the year 1833 under the name and style of the Sydney Mechanics’ School of Arts, the objects being the intellectual improvement of its members and the cultivation of literature, science and art.

— Charter of the SMSA

Under the leadership of such men as Carmichael and Nicholson, Mitchell, engineer Norman Selfe, and businessman Thomas Barker (who had been elected to the council of the Australian College in 1831) the school flourished and became one of the leading providers of adult education in the colony with more than 1500 students attending lectures and classes. Among those who gave classes were artist and teacher Joseph Fowles, suffragist Louisa Lawson, explorer Ludwig Leichhardt and poet Henry Kendall, and subjects included art, mathematics, architecture, anatomy and simple surgery. Officers and teachers of the school, such as Nicholson and John Woolley, also played a role in the establishment of the University of Sydney. The school was originally incorporated under its own Act of Parliament in 1874 with the Sydney Mechanics' School of Arts Incorporation Act. This was later replaced by an Act of the same name in 1886 that allowed greater financial freedom to the school's governing committee (namely the ability to borrow money and sell school assets) and amended in 1929 and 1940 to allow, respectively, the sale of the land granted by Governor Bourke and a reduction in size of the committee.

By the 1870s, some in the SMSA felt that the institution was drifting from its original purpose of educating the working class of Sydney and so proposed the expansion of its scope into technical education, and formed the Technical and Working Men's College.

The college was built at the rear of the Pitt Street buildings on newly acquired land that extended back to George Street, and included a new hall, laboratories, classrooms, offices and a yard area. The college breathed new life into the SMSA, with courses on practical learning attracting workers back to the School. College enrolments rose from 720 in the first year to 1198 in the second, and continued to increase over subsequent years. However lack of space was a perennial problem and college courses were soon being held in other rooms and buildings around the city. In addition, limited funding hampered further increases in the program, and in 1883 the New South Wales government took over the college, transforming it into the basis of a new technical college, which became the foundation for the Sydney Technical College. This continued to operate from the SMSA building and other rented properties in the city until it moved to the purpose-built technical college at Harris Street in Ultimo in 1891 which in turn became the University of Technology Sydney in 1988. The buildings are now used as the main campus of the Sydney Institute of TAFE, part of the State Government-run Technical and Further Education [TAFE] college system.

The original role of such Mechanic's Institutes was to provide education for adults who had received little formal education as children. Thus most of the Schools of Arts and Institutes had libraries attached, and in NSW the government provided grants for the purchase of books. But over the years, as the colonial (and later State) governments began to take greater responsibility for public education, this meant the end of most of these philanthropic organisations – a process that sped up when local councils also began to provide free public library facilities. By the 1970s, the SMSA was in financial difficulty with a large heritage building to maintain but a declining membership. It eventually sold its original building to raise capital in 1987 and moved into new premises across the road in 2000.

== Buildings ==
=== Original premises ===
In February 1837 the SMSA moved into their new building in Pitt Street. Although it had been established in 1833, it had no premises. The initial meetings were held in rooms around the city, firstly in the Australian College, and from 1834 until 1837 in rooms allocated in the house formerly occupied by Superintendent of Police Captain Francis Rossi at "Church Hill" in the Rocks district, which were provided by the Governor until the School could obtain a site for a permanent home. In January 1836 a lease was secured for a vacant site in Pitt Street adjacent to the Congregationalist Independent chapel, which had been designed by John Verge and opened in 1830. Tenders were called for in The Sydney Herald to erect a Mechanics' School of Arts building in March 1836 and the building was completed in time for the SMSA Annual General meeting on 6 February 1837.

In January 1845, an advertisement appeared in the newly retitled Sydney Morning Herald advising the public that the Sydney Mechanics' School of Arts building was for sale. The sale was proposed to fund the relocation of the school to a new site to allow for the construction of a larger building. It appears, however, that there was a change of heart, for the Committee of the SMSA purchased the building and the leasehold of the property itself, and began planning extensions on the site.

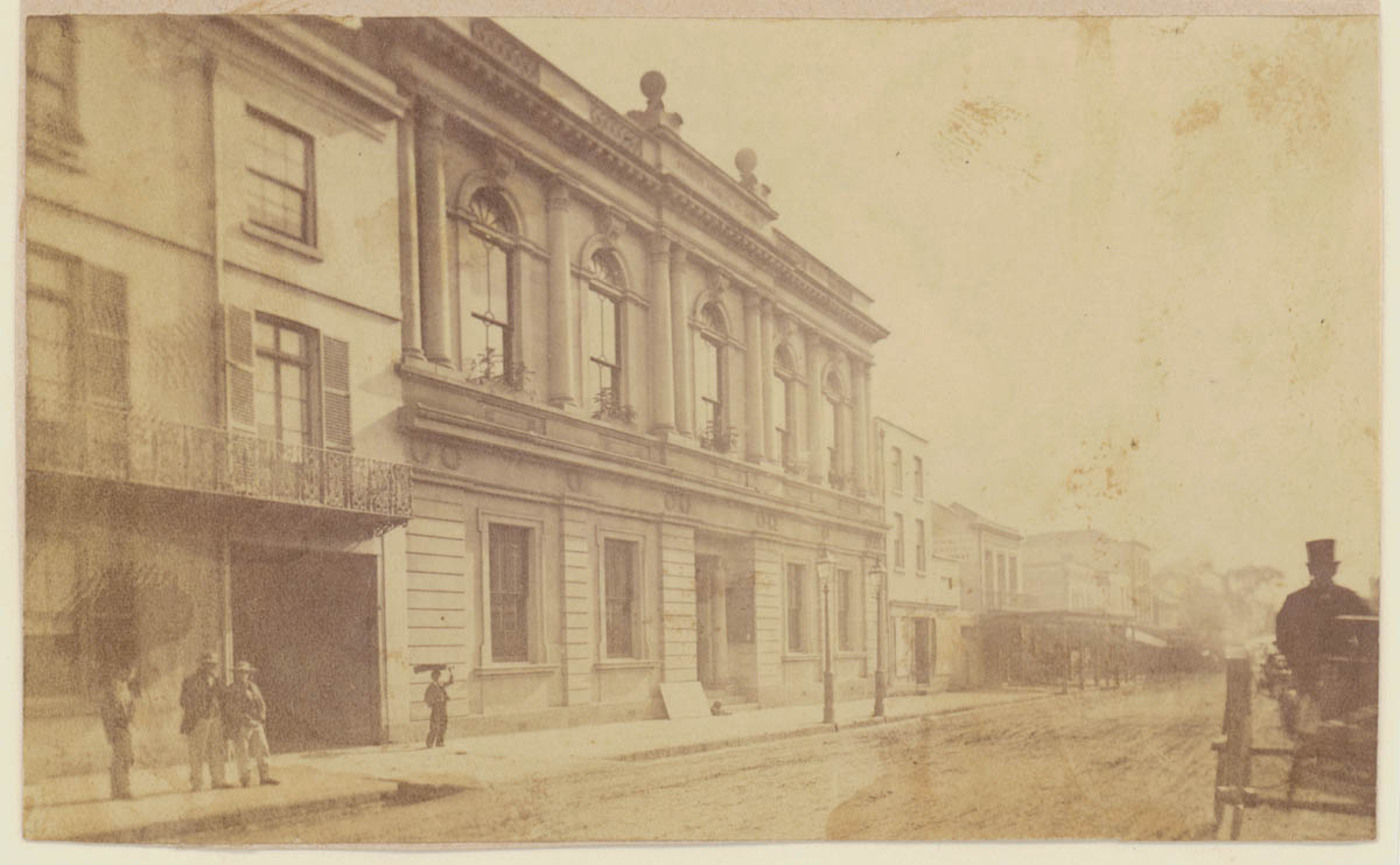
The façade of the original SMSA building, pictured in 1869

The need for extra space was a constant concern for the SMSA. In 1852 a petition was presented to the Legislative Council seeking permission for the SMSA to sell or swap a parcel of land set aside for it in George Street South for the purpose of purchasing a site in a more central location. With the funds available the SMSA Committee was able to move quickly when the neighbouring building, the Independent Chapel, was put on the market on 7 January 1855. Purchasing this site gave the School the opportunity to double the size of its building without having to relocate. With this in mind, a public appeal for donations to fund proposed works was advertised in newspapers from 1856.

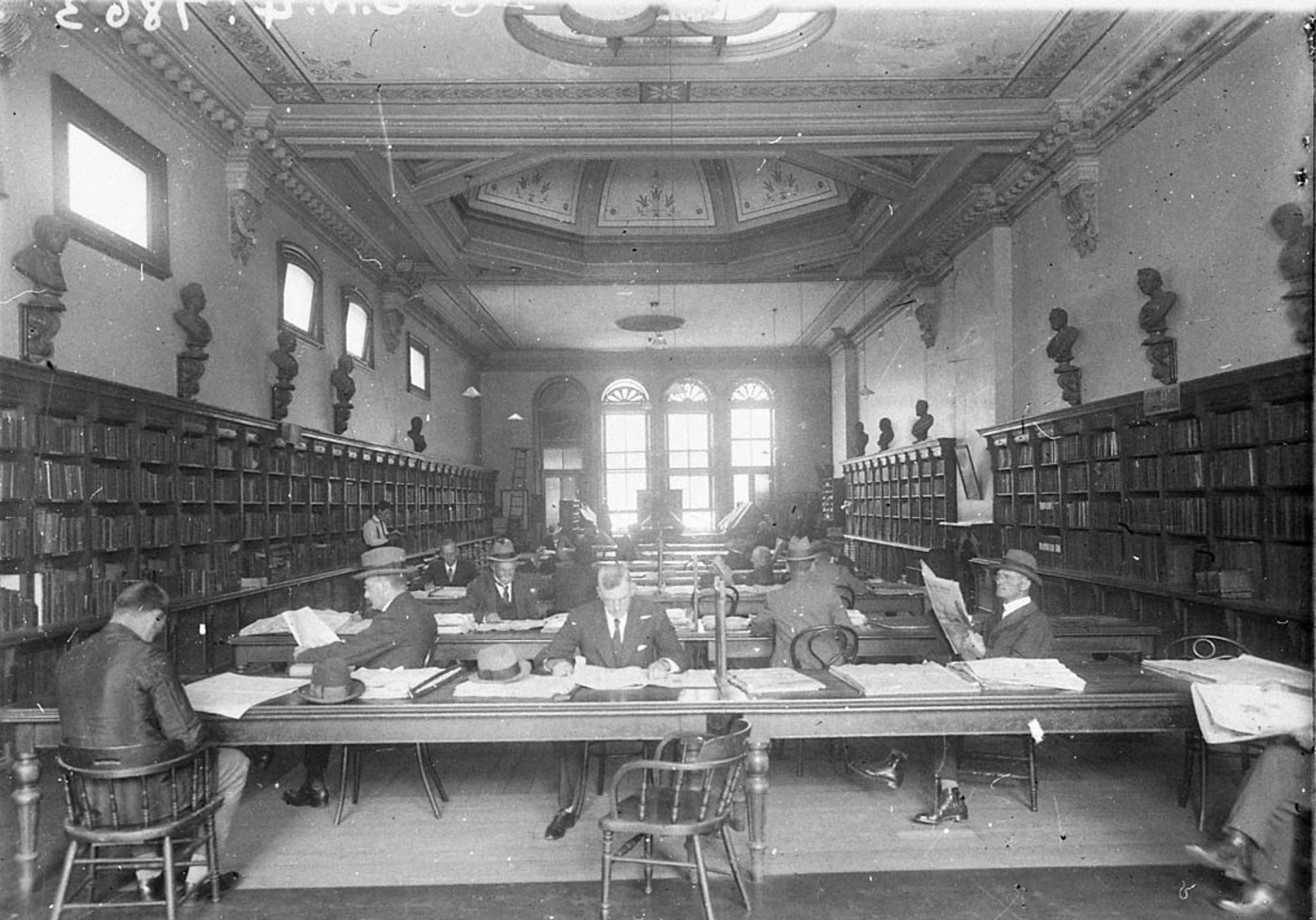
Library Reading Room, 275 Pitt Street, Sydney, ca. 1925, by Sam Hood

Work began in earnest in early 1860 which joined the two formerly separate buildings of the old SMSA and the Independent Chapel into one frontage. Internally the walls of the older buildings and many of the internal spaces were retained and adapted. The new façade was designed in a Palladian style with late Georgian features such as Corinthian columns on the upper level, round fanlights with keystones, corbelled cornice and interlocking circles with a central panel inscribed "Sydney School of Arts", all of which are still visible. With the building works completed, but with a £2000 debt, classes continued. Ongoing repairs and alterations, such as new skylights to the reading room, lining of walls and ceilings and other works, contributed to costs for the School.

The new building served the SMSA well, providing more room for concerts and performances, larger reading rooms and reference library as well as updated facilities including new overhead gas lighting. Already "one of the most prosperous institutions in the colony...", the renovations made it even more attractive and were expected to "...bring about an increase in its membership." Excavations were also proposed for the installation of an electric motor to power the School's lighting. However, after the government took over the Technical and Working Men's College and then stopped leasing the SMSA hall for the new Sydney Technical College at the beginning of 1888, the loss of income to the School meant that this work did not proceed. A continuing downturn in income saw further changes made to the SMSA building in a bid to improve finances. Between 1891 and 1894 the rents received by the SMSA fell from £1670 to £439 per annum. The decision to build shops into the front of the building was taken and in 1895–96 three shops were added to the ground floor in what had been the library and committee room provided much-needed revenue for the SMSA which was otherwise in decline. With falling cash reserves, by the early 1980s the SMSA found it increasingly difficult to maintain the building and began to consider selling the site.

=== New premises ===
In 1988 the SMSA moved out of its original home to Town Hall House, the first of a series of temporary homes over the next 12 years.

The funds from the sale allowed the SMSA to purchase in 1996 Lincoln House across the road at 280 Pitt Street – a 10-storey brick building with street-level retail premises and nine commercial office levels.

Lincoln House was designed by well-known Sydney architects Spain & Cosh for bicycle and motorcycle manufacturers, importers, and retailers, Bennett & Wood. Fronting both Pitt and Bathurst Streets, it is an L-shaped building that wrapped around the existing headquarters on the corner. It was briefly named Speedwell House (like the original building), but was renamed Lincoln House in 1927.

Lincoln house was renovated after being bought by the School of Arts, including the addition of a library, auditorium, and seminar rooms on the first three floors. The rest of the building was retained office space, leased to other businesses and not-for-profit organisations. The School of Arts moved in during 2000.

== The Tom Keneally Centre ==
In 2011, the SMSA opened The Tom Keneally Centre, which holds the research collection of world-renowned author Thomas Keneally from his private collection and memorabilia.

== See also ==
- Sydney School of Arts building
