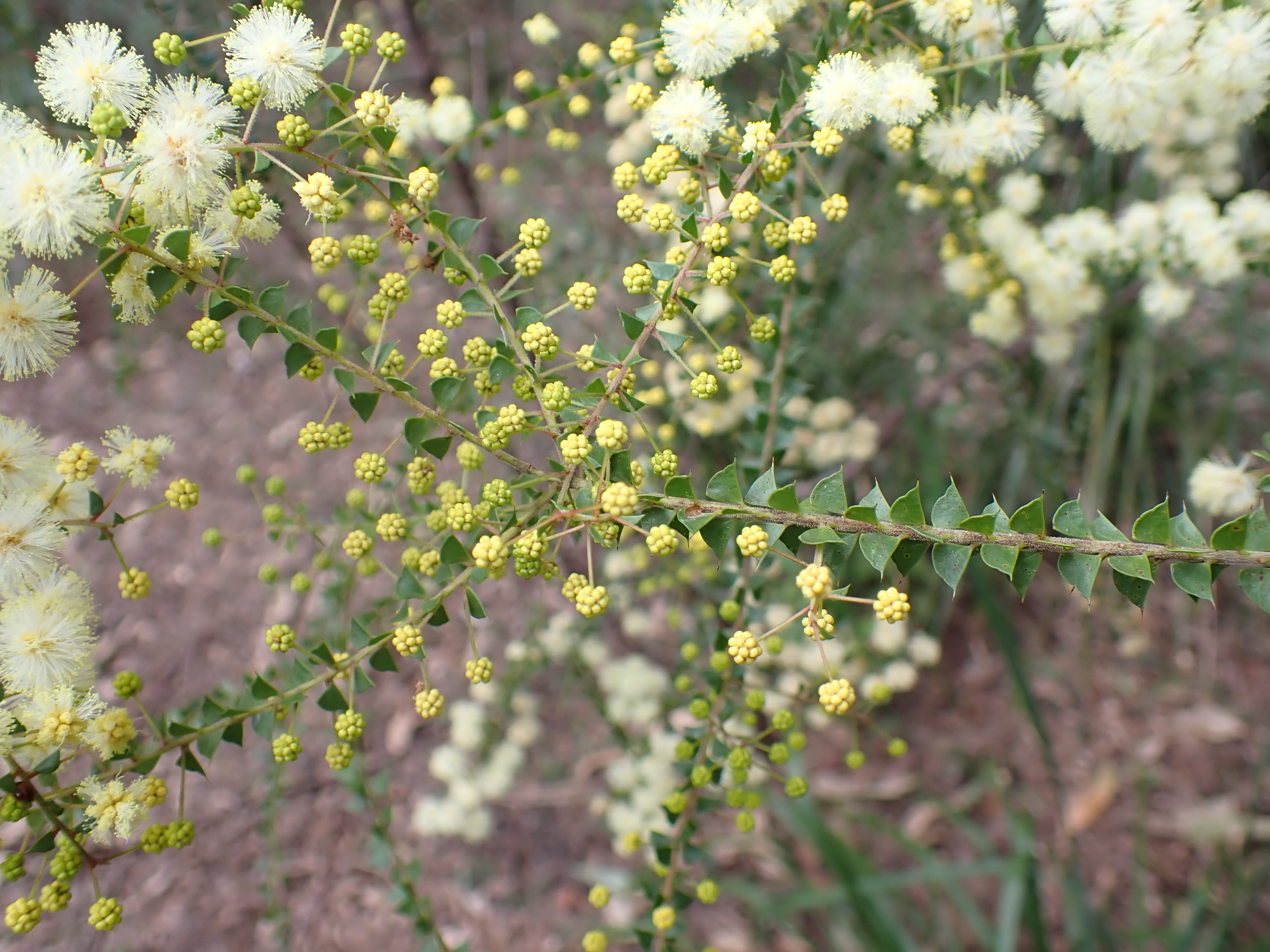
- In Maroochy Regional Bushland Botanic Garden, Tanawha

Scientific classification
- Kingdom: Plantae
- Clade: Tracheophytes
- Clade: Angiosperms
- Clade: Eudicots
- Clade: Rosids
- Order: Fabales
- Family: Fabaceae
- Subfamily: Caesalpinioideae
- Clade: Mimosoid clade
- Genus: Acacia
- Species: A. hubbardiana

Binomial name
- Acacia hubbardiana Pedley
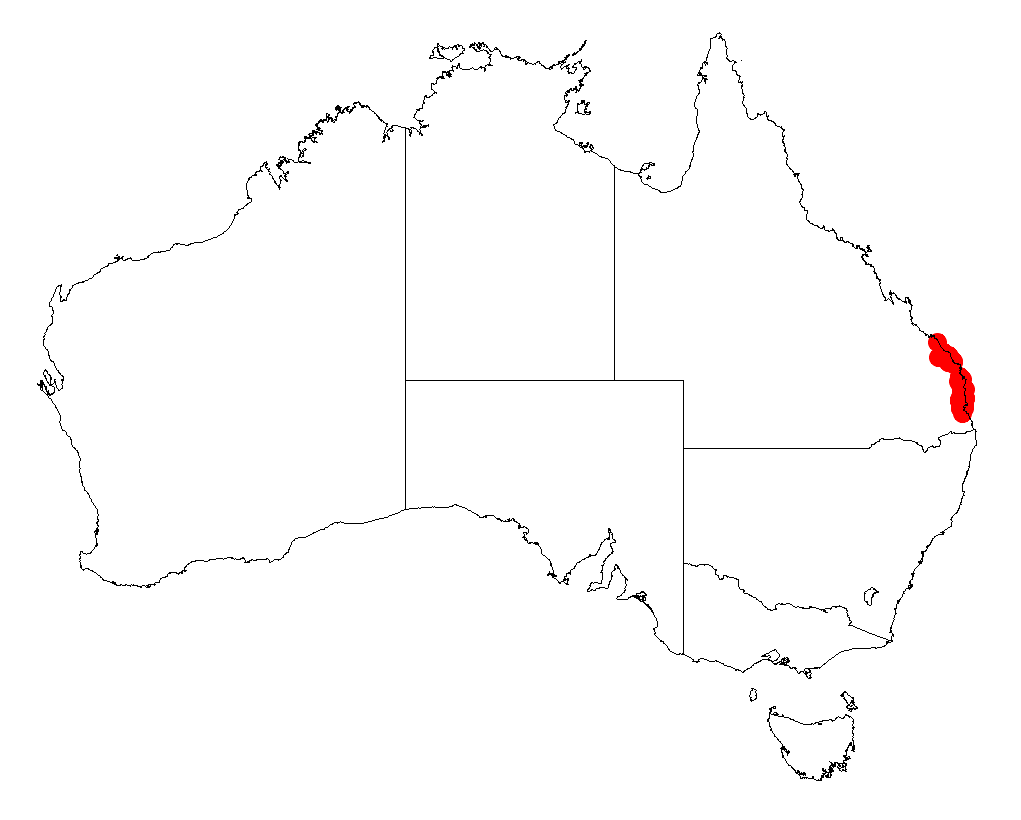
- Occurrence data from AVH

Synonyms
- Acacia plagiophylla F.Muell. nom. illeg.; Acacia undulifolia var. humilis Benth. p.p.>; Racosperma hubbardianum (Pedley) Pedley

= Acacia hubbardiana =

Yellow prickly moses

Species of legume

Acacia hubbardiana, commonly known as yellow prickly Moses or prickly Moses, is a species of flowering plant in the family Fabaceae and is endemic to south-eastern Queensland, Australia. It is a spreading shrub with dimidiate, sharply-pointed, glabrous phyllodes, spherical heads of creamy-yellow flowers and thinly leathery, oblong to narrowly oblong pods.

== Description ==
Acacia hubbardiana is a spreading shrub with sharply pointed, glabrous phyllodes 5–10 mm (0.20–0.39 in) long and 3–8 mm (0.12–0.31 in) wide. The phyllodes have one more or less straight edge and the other edge convex and partly near the branchlet. The flowers are borne in spherical heads in axils near the ends of branchlets on a peduncle 5–12 mm (0.20–0.47 in) long, sometimes in racemes up to 30 mm (1.2 in) long, each head with 15 to 20 creamy yellow flowers. The pods are thinly leathery, oblong to narrowly oblong, up to 50 mm (2.0 in) long and 10–15 mm (0.39–0.59 in) wide and raised over the seeds, the seeds about 4.5 mm (0.18 in) long.

== Taxonomy ==
This species was first formally described in 1859 by Ferdinand von Mueller who gave it the name Acacia plagiophylla in the Journal of the Proceedings of the Linnean Society, Botany, but the name was illegitimate because it had already been used in 1826 for a separate species by Sprengel. In 1969, Leslie Pedley gave it the name A. hubbardiana in Contributions from the Queensland Herbarium. The specific epithet (hubbardiana) honours Charles Edward Hubbard, "who collected extensively in Queensland".

== Distribution and habitat ==
Yellow prickly Moses grows along coastal parts of south eastern Queensland from near Bundaberg in the north to Brisbane in the south, where it is found on coastal plains, swamps and lowlands in poorly drained, sandy soils in open woodland or heath.

== Conservation status ==
Acacia hubbardiana is listed as of "least concern" under the Queensland Government Nature Conservation Act 1992.

== See also ==
- List of Acacia species
