= Joseph Fowles =

Australian artist (1809-1878)

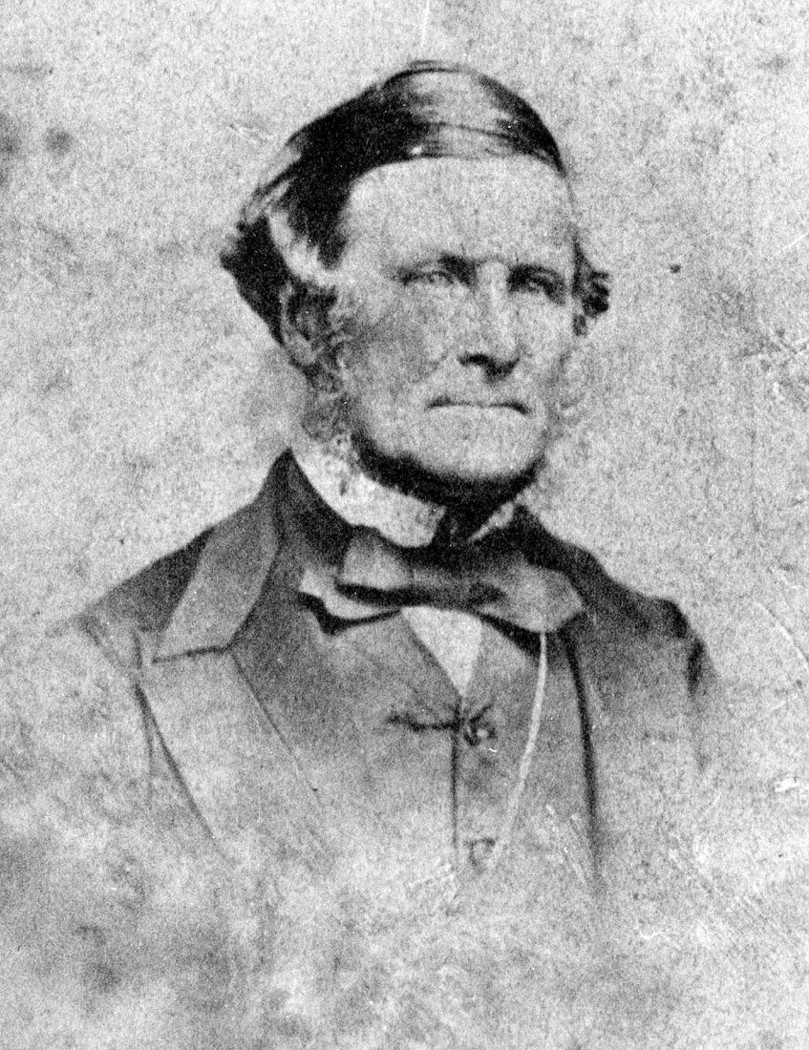
- Joseph Fowles author of "Sydney in 1848"
- Born: Joseph Fowles; 24 December 1809; Kings Stanley, Gloucestershire, England
- Died: 25 June 1878 (aged 68); Sydney, NSW, Australia
- Resting place: Rookwood Cemetery
- Occupations: artist and teacher
- Known for: "Sydney in 1848"
- Spouses: Sarah Bird Goldstone m. 1831 Bath, Somerset, England; Emily Collyer Sydney, NSW, Australia (7 children); Elizabeth Harris m. 1874 Sydney, NSW, Australia (4 children)
- Parent(s): William Fowles and Elizabeth Adey

Joseph Fowles (24 December 1809 – 25 June 1878) was an Australian artist and educator, perhaps best remembered for his publication "Sydney in 1848", a series of etchings depicting Sydney’s streets and buildings in that year.

== Early life and arrival ==
=== Voyage ===
Fowles was an artist but not much is known of his early life apart from what can be gleaned from the journal of his voyage to New South Wales held in the Mitchell Library, Sydney. During the voyage he painted on deck and his illustrated journal includes islands and ports of call en route.

He arrived in Sydney on 31 August 1838 via Hobart as an unassisted cabin passenger aboard the "Fortune" with his wife Sarah and partner Emily Collyer.

=== Life in Sydney ===
His journal states that leased a property at Hunters Hill owned by Mary Reiby known as Figtree Farm. Here on the farm he produced fruit and vegetables and obtained timber sold at market in Sydney. The Fowles family lived at Hunters Hill into the 1840s during which time his wife Sarah returned to England and Fowles took up with his companion Emily Lambrigg Collyer. They were to have seven children.

== Career as an artist ==
=== Marine painter ===
Fowles opened a studio in Harrington Street in Sydney’s Rocks in the 1840s and gained a reputation as a marine painter. At the first public exhibition of art in the colony in 1847 presented by the Society for the Promotion of Fine Arts in Australia he exhibited 7 works featuring maritime subjects: five were of ships and one “Kangaroos” his first documented animal painting.

The Sydney Morning Herald described him as a marine painter successful in capturing the likeness of ships in his work.

Fowles exhibited three further maritime paintings in the same exhibition in 1849.

=== Etchings and drawings of Sydney ===
==== Sydney in 1848 ====
The major artistic work of Joseph Fowles career was a series of etchings depicting the town of Sydney in 1848. Sydney had been transformed in the years following Fowles arrival and he set himself the task of conveying the bustling new city in a series of streetscape etchings identifying administrative, commercial, religious and residential buildings of the city.

“Sydney in 1848” appeared in 20 fortnightly parts between 1848 and 1850. The collection of etchings proved popular, being published in full in 1878 and subsequently in 1882, 1962 and 1973.

Fowles believed Sydney’s stature as a city had not been recognised in Britain. The purpose of this project was to change any such perceptions to the contrary as he outlined in the serial installments appearing in the press and in the print publication:

“The principal object of this Work is to remove the erroneous and discreditable notions current in England concerning this City, in common with everything else connected with the Colony. We shall endeavour to represent Sydney as it really is – to exhibit its spacious Gas-lit Streets, crowded by an active thriving Population – its Public Edifices, and its sumptuous Shops, which boldly claim a comparison with those of London itself”

The work remains an important source for Sydney’s early history.

==== Sydney Views ====
“Sydney in 1848” marked a move away from marine subjects toward landscapes, in particular views of Sydney. These included scenes of Sydney around Millers Point, Sydney residences including Bungarrabee (Eastern Creek) and Emu Hall (Penrith). Street scenes included a portrait of publican Stephen Butts on a white horse, outside his fashionable terrace house in Macquarie Street. The latter work signalled Fowles’ other artistic phase as an animal portraitist, especially horses.

==== Equine and Animal subjects ====
Fowles penchant for painting horses was related to his love of horse racing. He painted commissioned works as well as contributing to exhibitions in the 1850s and 1860s. He established a successful business selling portraits of champion racehorses.

He established stables near Randwick racecourse, named The Newmarket training stables. The Sydney Morning Herald reported these stables built by ‘Mr Fowles the well-known animal painter of Sydney’ to be ‘the most complete establishment of the kind in the colony’

Despite a financial setback in which the stables sent him into insolvency he remained well connected in the racing industry affiliated with Homebush Jockey Club and the Tattersall’s Club.

== Career as a teacher ==
The success of Fowles major artistic work: “Sydney in 1848” acted as a springboard for a career as a drawing teacher that was to last for the rest of his life.

From his first appointment at a private boarding school in Liverpool Street, Sydney, in 1851–1852 to a succession of city public schools in the late 1870s he had a long and distinguished career in education. His major appointments included Sydney Mechanics School of Art (1854–1861), Sydney Grammar School (1867–74) and Kings School (1871–73)

He became drawing master for the Board of National Education forerunner of the New South Wales Department of Education. Fowles published instructional manuals for drawing for students and teachers such as the “Sydney Drawing Book” that underpinned the curriculum in NSW government schools into the 1880s.

It was said that through Fowles efforts drawing was being taught at every government school in New South Wales at the comparatively early date of 1869.

== Later life ==
Joseph Fowles suffered seizures later in life and his obituary records that a third recorded instance was to prove fatal on the evening of 25 June 1878.

The notice in the Sydney Morning Herald remembers him for his artistic talent, referring to him as “father of drawing in the city.” A reference is made to “Sydney in 1848” and as a painter of animals in which “Mr Fowles especially excelled”. His service to education is acknowledged and his many years as drawing master to the National Board of Education.

== Gallery ==
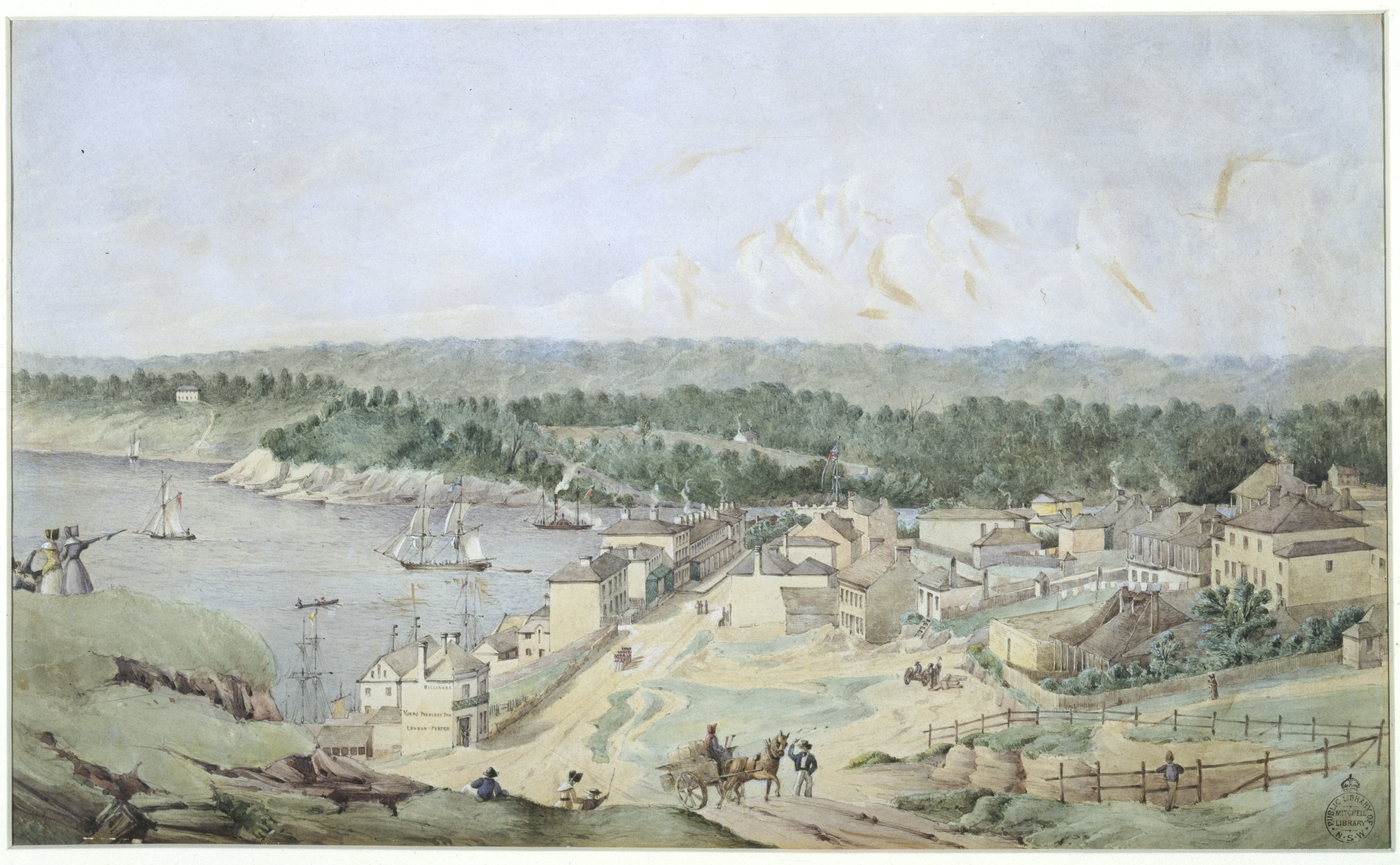
Millers Point, Sydney (ca. 1845)

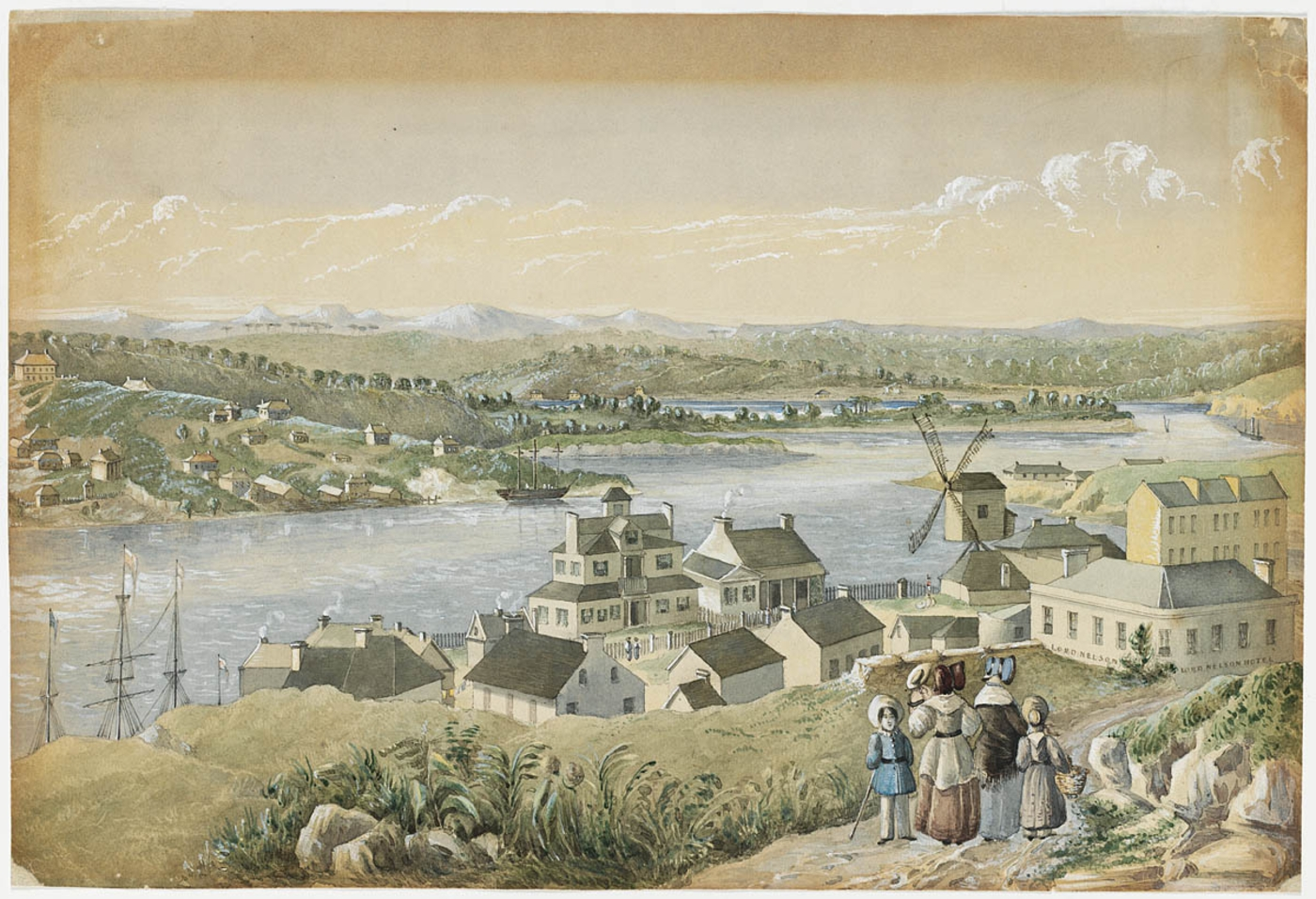
Millers Point (ca. 1845)

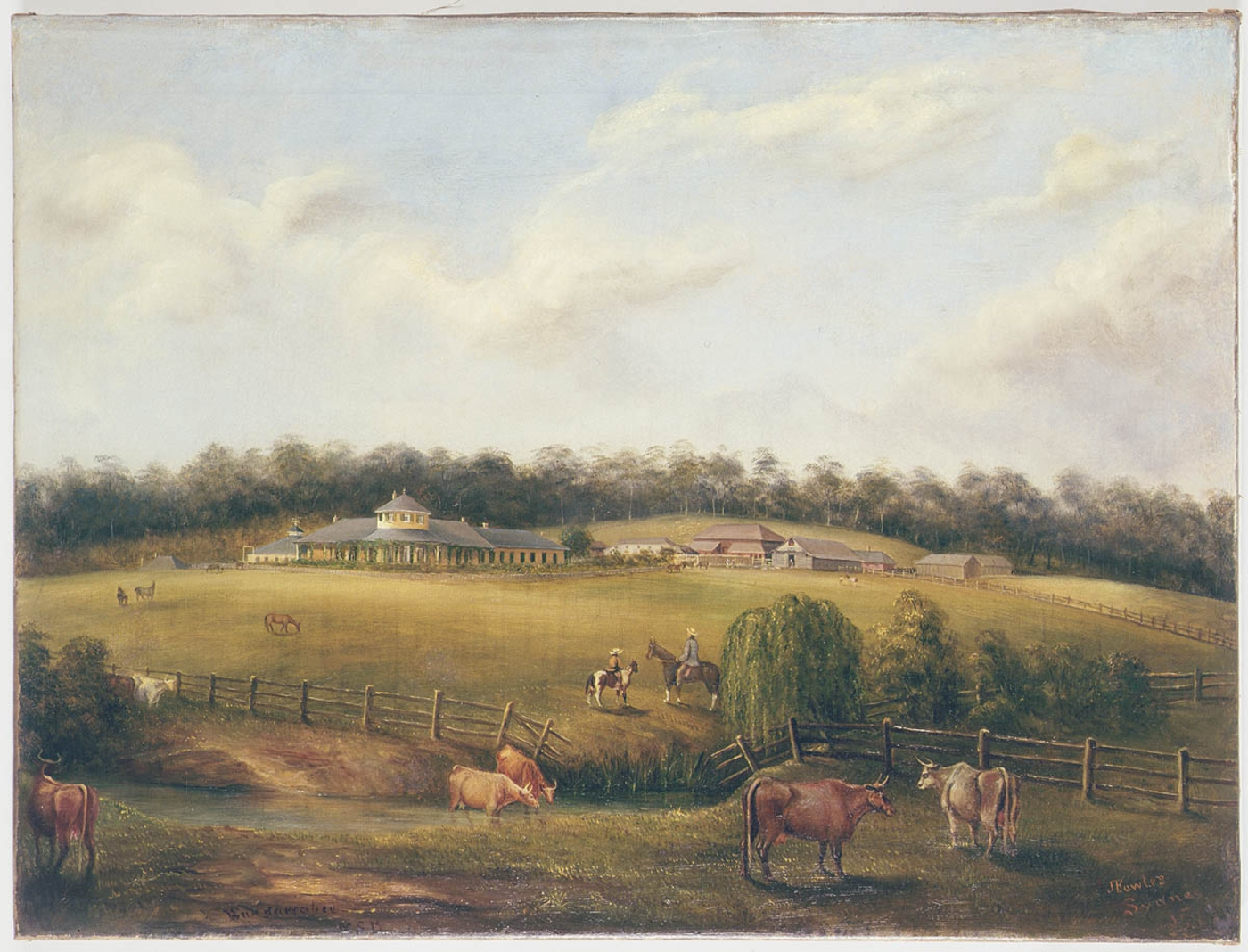
View of Bungarrabee (1858)

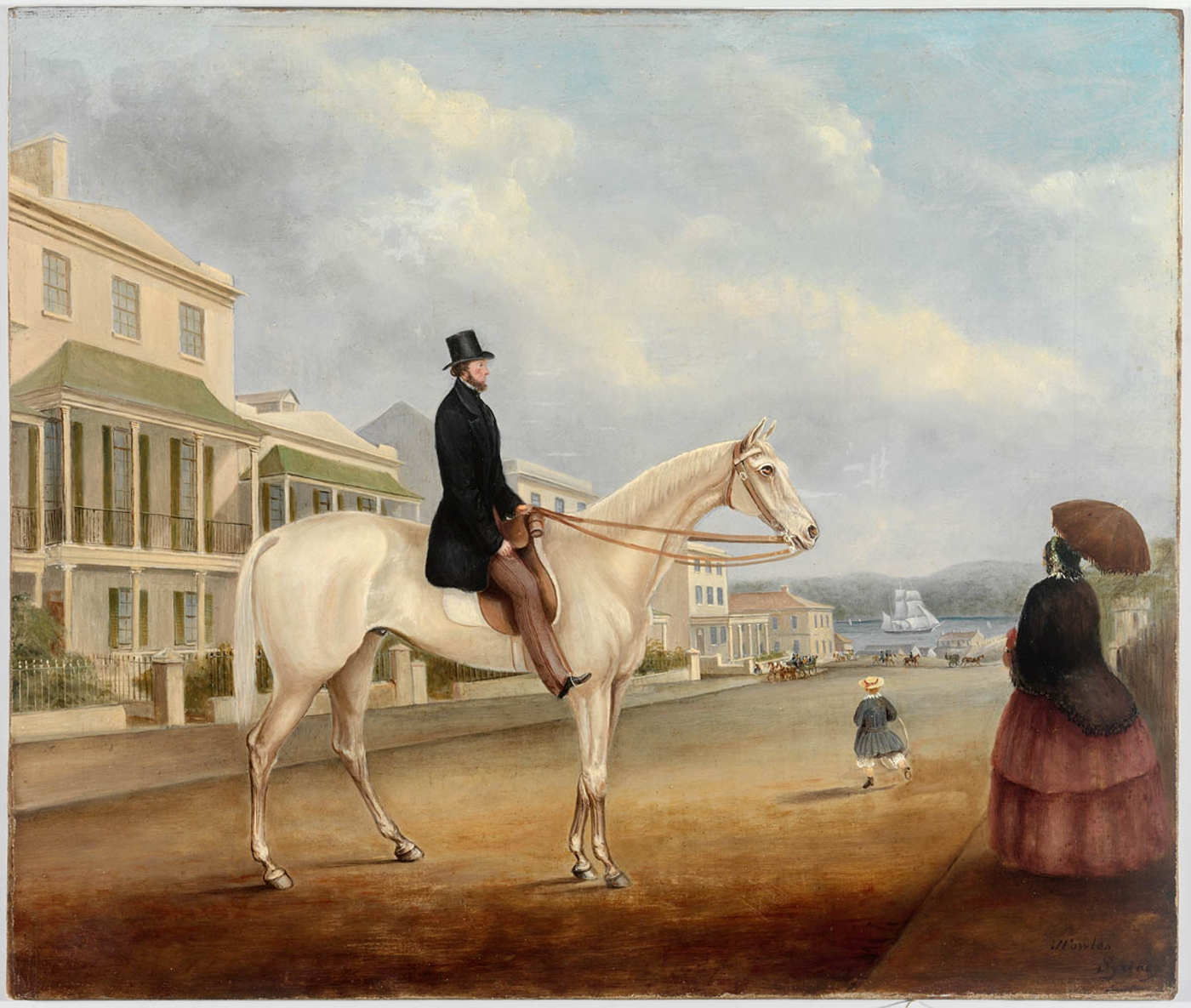
Stephen Butts on a white horse, Macquarie Street, Sydney (ca. 1850)

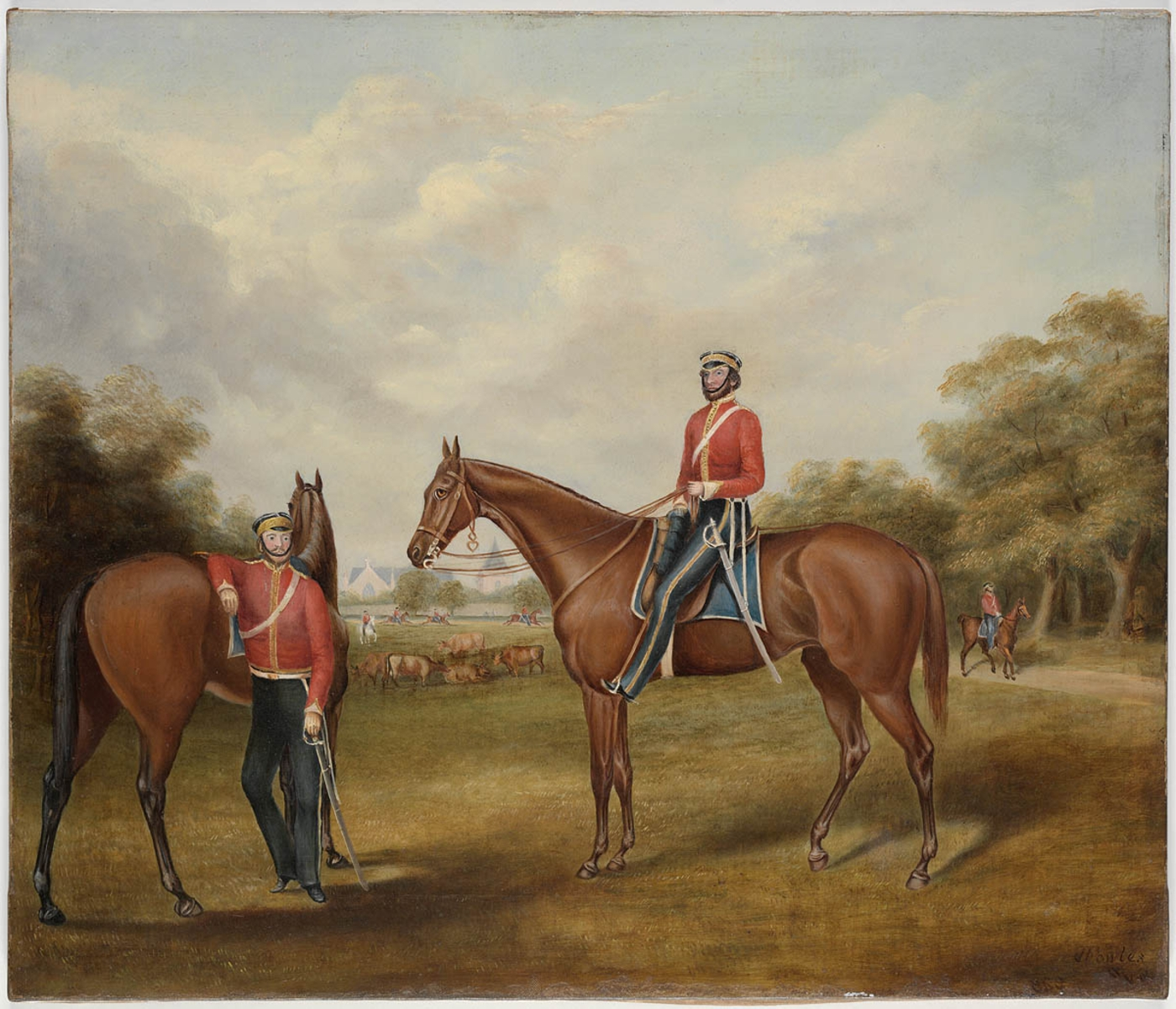
Captain Frederick Butts and a fellow officer of the 77th (East Middlesex) Regiment of Foot, Hyde Park, Sydney (1858)

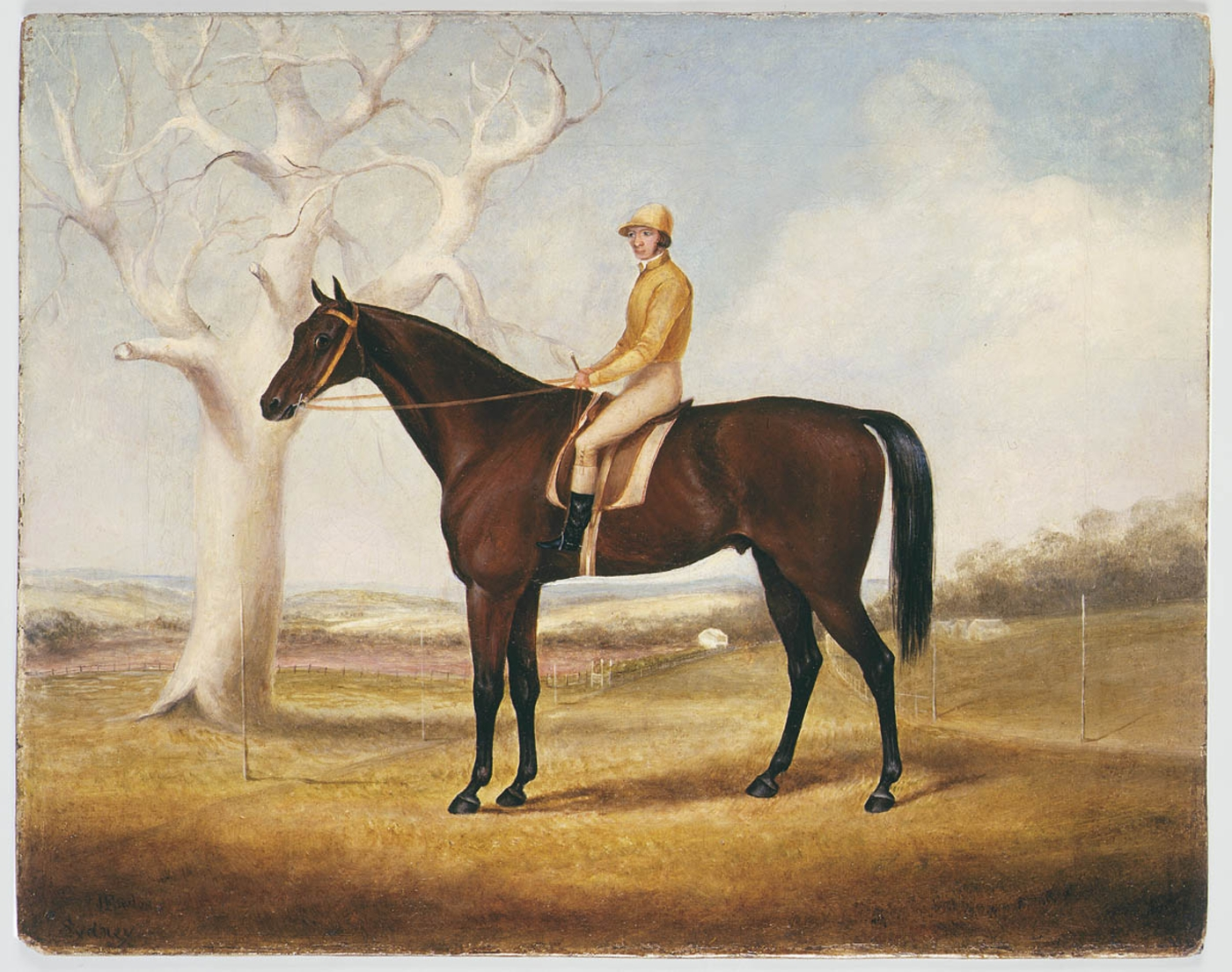
Race horse and jockey (no date)

== See also ==
- Australian art
