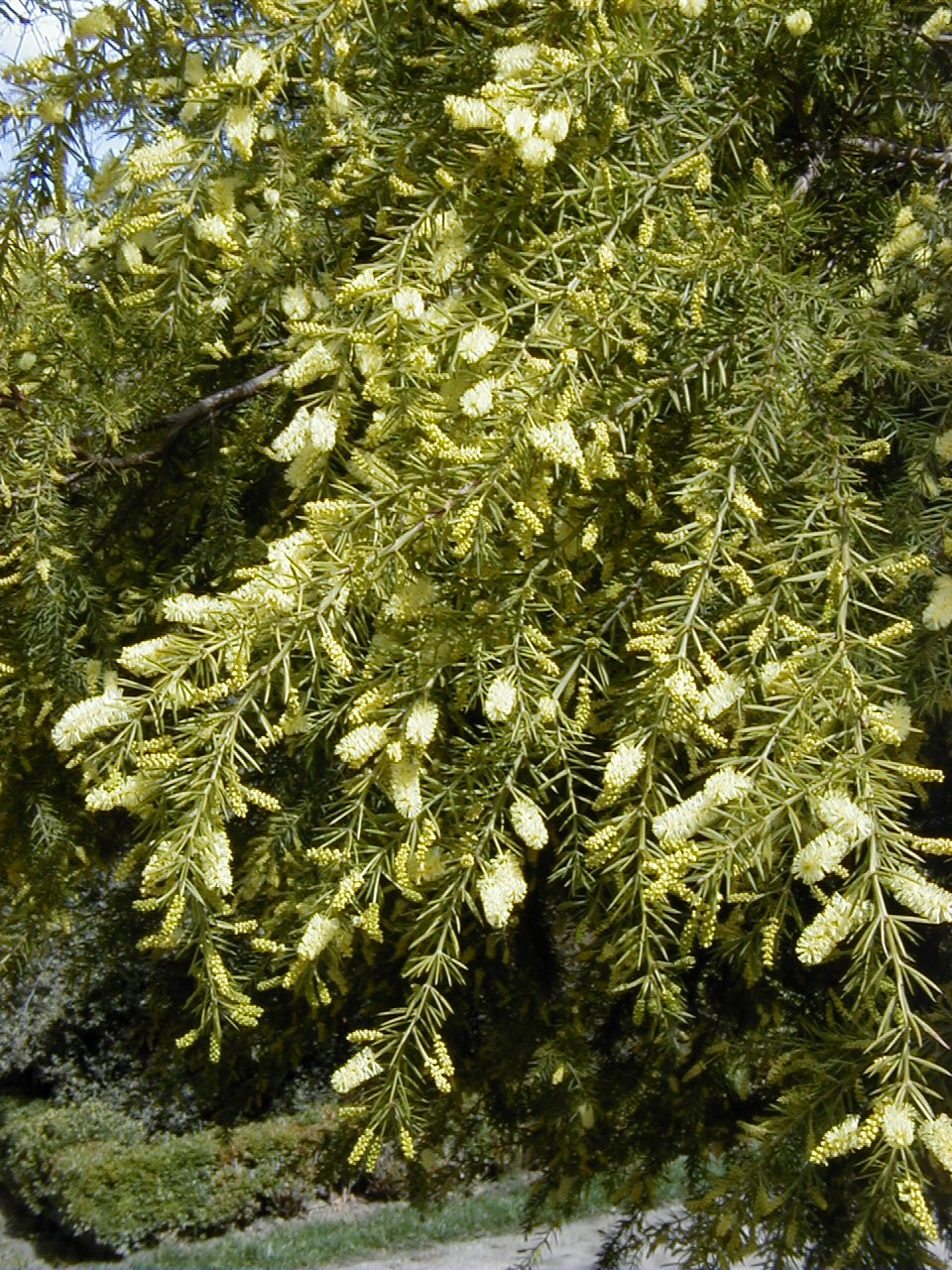
- In the Madrid Botanical Garden

Conservation status
- Least Concern (IUCN 3.1)

Scientific classification
- Kingdom: Plantae
- Clade: Embryophytes
- Clade: Tracheophytes
- Clade: Spermatophytes
- Clade: Angiosperms
- Clade: Eudicots
- Clade: Rosids
- Order: Fabales
- Family: Fabaceae
- Subfamily: Caesalpinioideae
- Clade: Mimosoid clade
- Genus: Acacia
- Species: A. verticillata

Binomial name
- Acacia verticillata (L'Hér.) Willd.
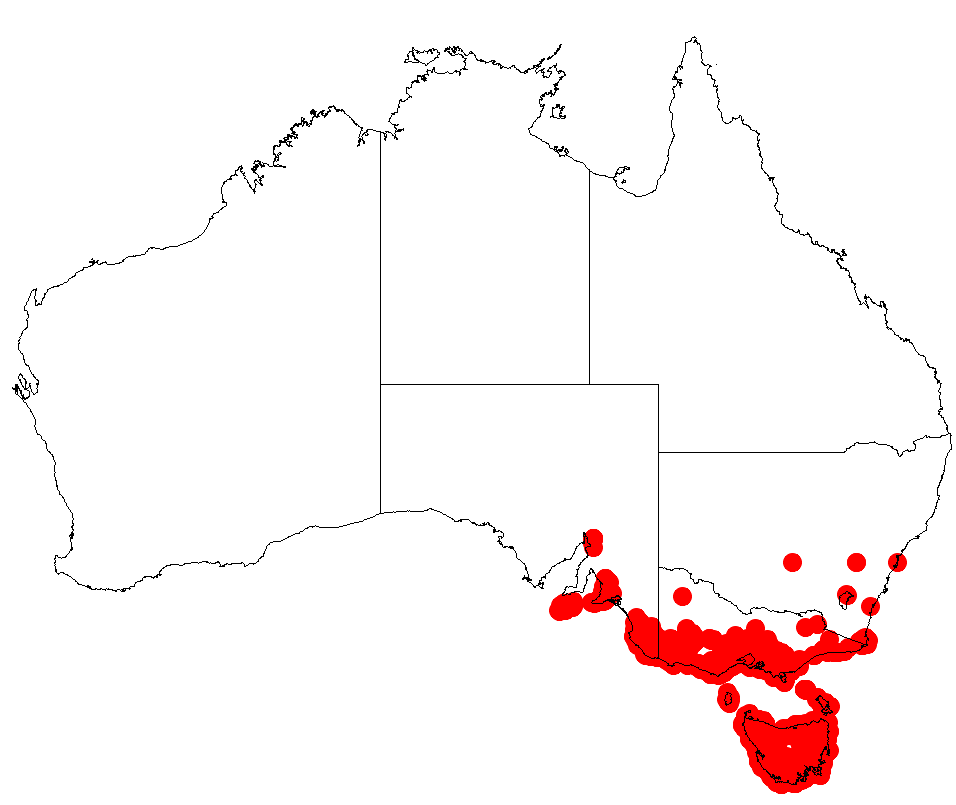
- Occurrence data from AVH

Synonyms
- Acacia verticillata Benth.; Acacia verticillata (L'Hér.) Willd. var. angusta DC.; Acacia verticillata (L'Hér.) Willd. var. glabra DC.; Mimosa verticillata L'Hér.; Phyllodoce verticillata (L'Hér.) Link; Racosperma verticillatum (L'Hér.) C. Mart.

= Acacia verticillata =

Prickly moses

Species of legume

Acacia verticillata (prickly Moses; prickly-leaved wattle; star-leaved acacia; prickly mimosa; whorl-leaved acacia) is a perennial shrub to small tree native to south eastern Australia.

== Description ==
The shrub or tree can grow to a maximum height of around 10 m (33 ft) and has a spreading habit. The branchlets have bristly prickling stipules with a length of 0.5 to 2 mm (0.020 to 0.079 in) in length. Like most species of Acacia it has phyllodes rather than true leaves. The evergreen phyllodes grow in bundles that are all crowded together and are whorled that have a linear or lanceolate shape with a length of 5 to 25 mm (0.20 to 0.98 in) and a width of 1 to 7 mm (0.039 to 0.276 in). The phyllodes are glabrous, pungent and rigid with one main visible vein. It blooms between July and December producing simple inflorescences on glabrous stalks with a length of 2 to 5 mm (0.079 to 0.197 in). The ovoid the spherical flower-spikes have a length of up to 4.5 cm (1.8 in) with densely pack light yellow coloured flowers. The compressed a linear seed pods that form after flowering are barely constricted between each of the seeds. The pods are 2 to 8 cm (0.79 to 3.15 in) in length and have a width of 3 to 5 mm (0.12 to 0.20 in) and have quite thin valves. The elliptic shaped seeds are around 3 to 4 mm (0.12 to 0.16 in) in length and have a filamentous funicle that folds and thickens into a turbinate aril.

== Taxonomy ==
The species was first described by Charles Louis L'Héritier de Brutelle in 1806 as part of Carl Ludwig Willdenows work Species Plantarum. It was reclassified as Racosperma verticillatum by Leslie Pedley in 2003 then transferred back to genus Acacia in 2006.

Four subspecies are known:

- Acacia verticillata subsp. verticillata
- Acacia verticillata subsp. ruscifolia
- Acacia verticillata subsp. cephalantha
- Acacia verticillata subsp. ovoidea

== Distribution ==
A. verticillata is endemic to New South Wales, Victoria, South Australia and Tasmania. The species is a common understorey shrub in both wet and dry sclerophyll forests as well as scrub and heath. In coastal environments it will often have much wider leaves as opposed to the regular needle-like nature of inland specimens. The range of the plant extends from the Gulf St Vincent in South Australia throughout the south-eastern parts and into southern and south eastern Victoria and far south-eastern New South Wales and Tasmania including the islands in Bass Strait where it is situated in saline, riparian and submontane areas.

== Uses ==
Prickly Moses is sold commercially for cultivation and can grow in full sun or part shade in a variety of locations including plains, hills and footslopes as a second line from the coast. It will grow in clay or loam soils that are alkaline, neutral or acidic and will tolerate drought, water logging and a moderate frost. It is regarded as an excellent habitat for birds but is highly flammable and not recommended for near houses in bushfire prone areas. Indigenous Australians used the fibre from the plant to make fishing lines.

== In popular culture ==
On 1 September 2016, the Reserve Bank of Australia released a replacement of the polymer five dollar note which includes a depiction of Acacia verticillata (subspecies ovoidea).

== See also ==
- List of Acacia species
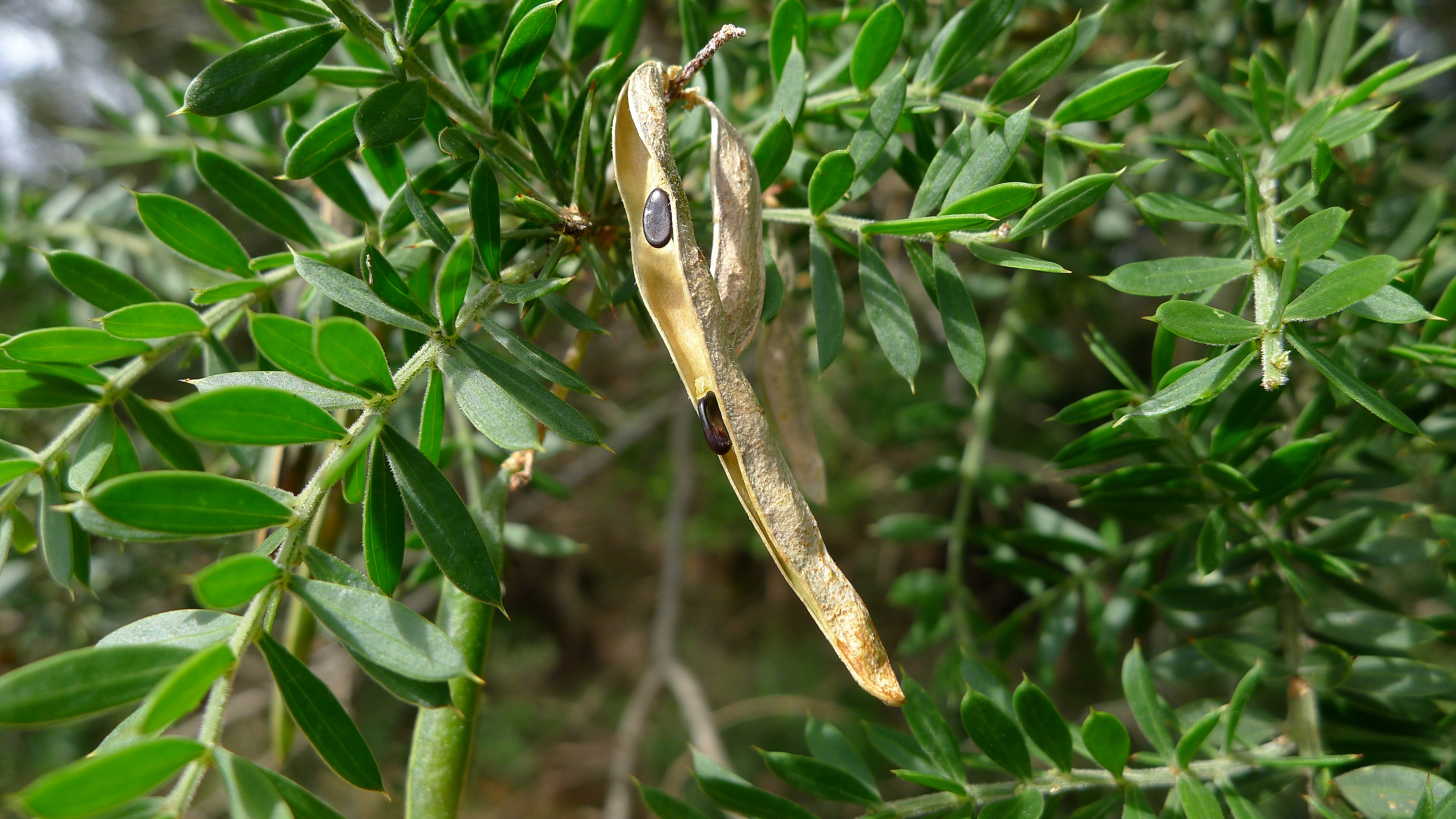
Seed pods

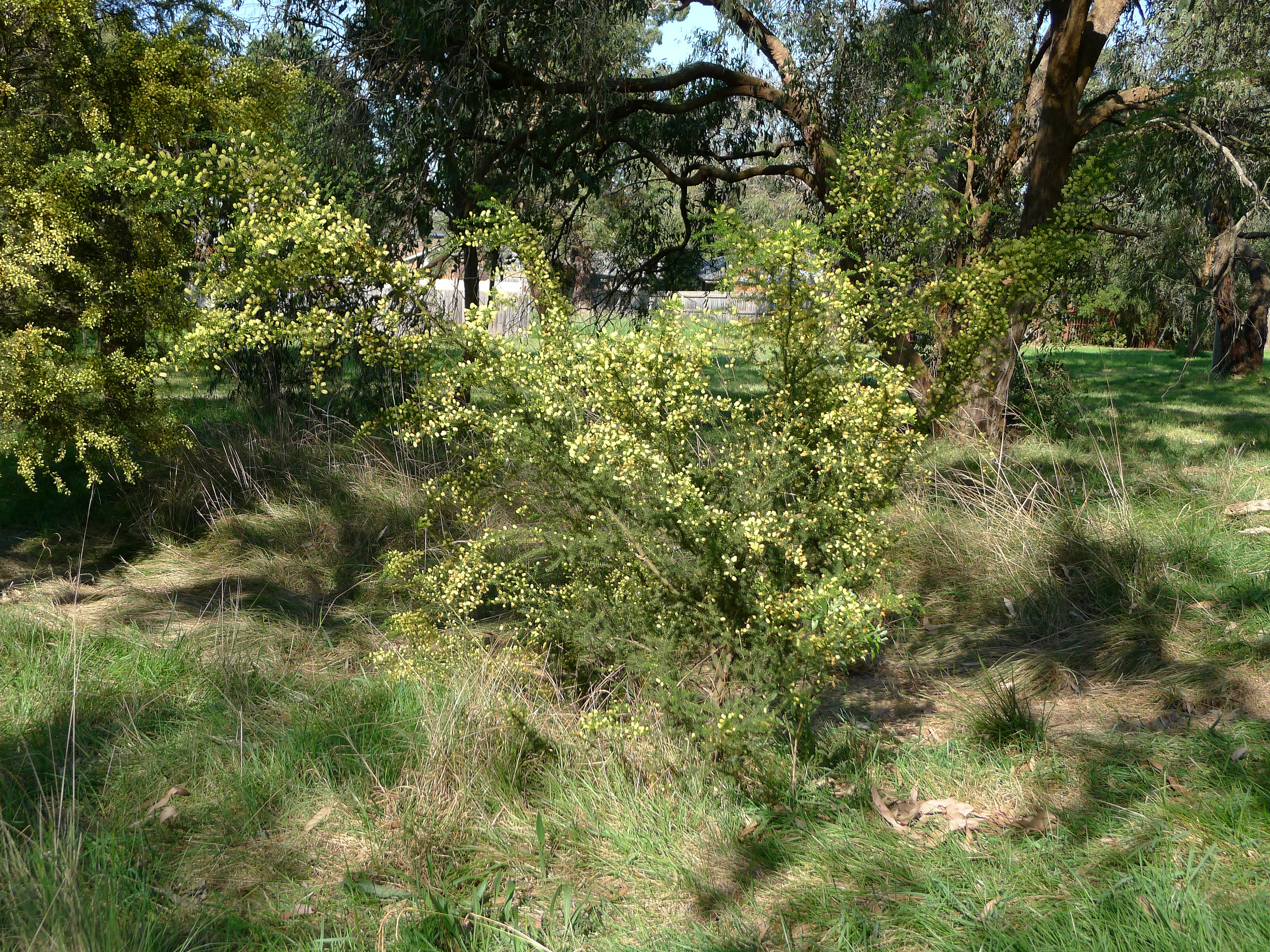
Habit

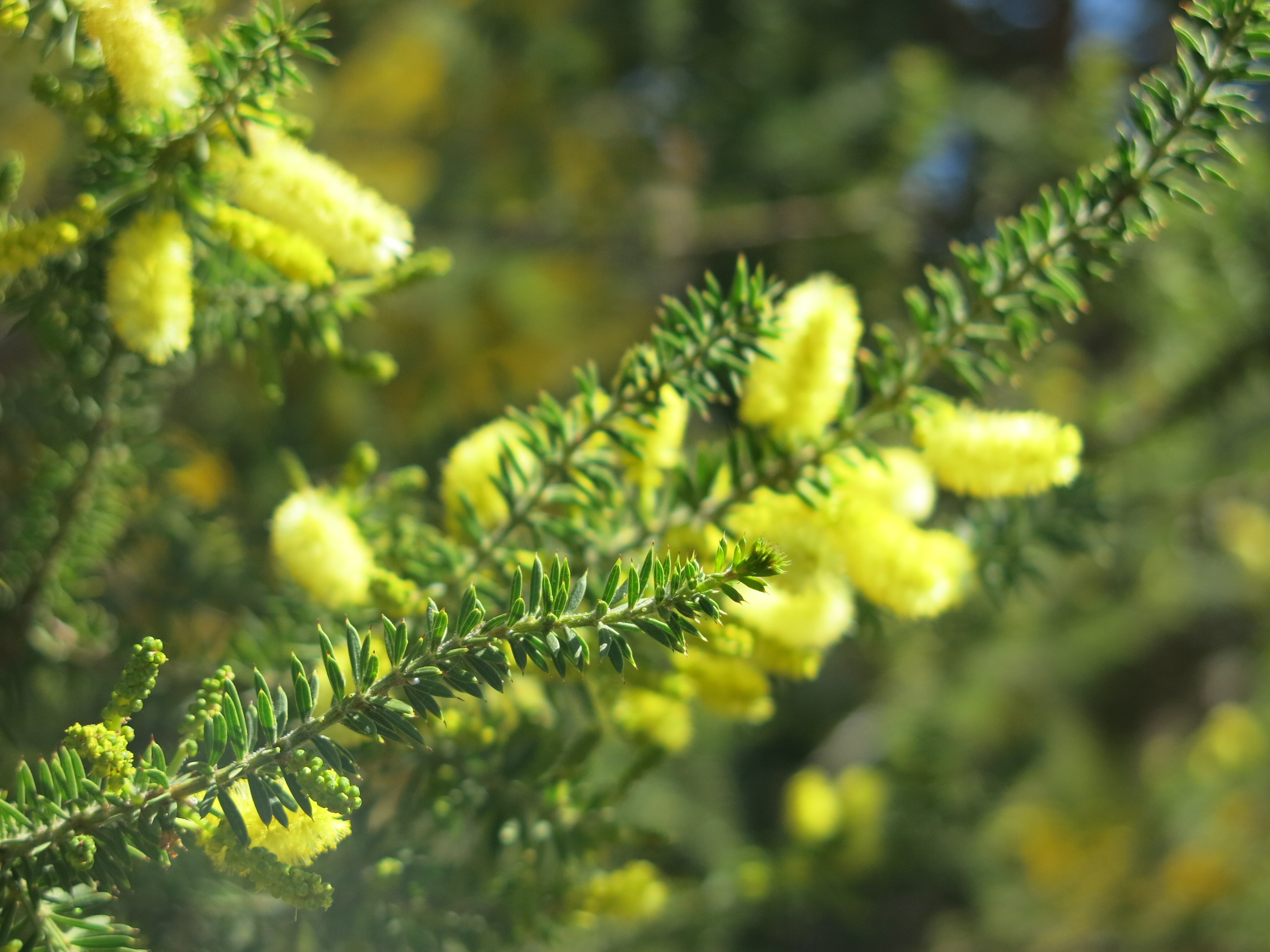
Foliage and inflorescences

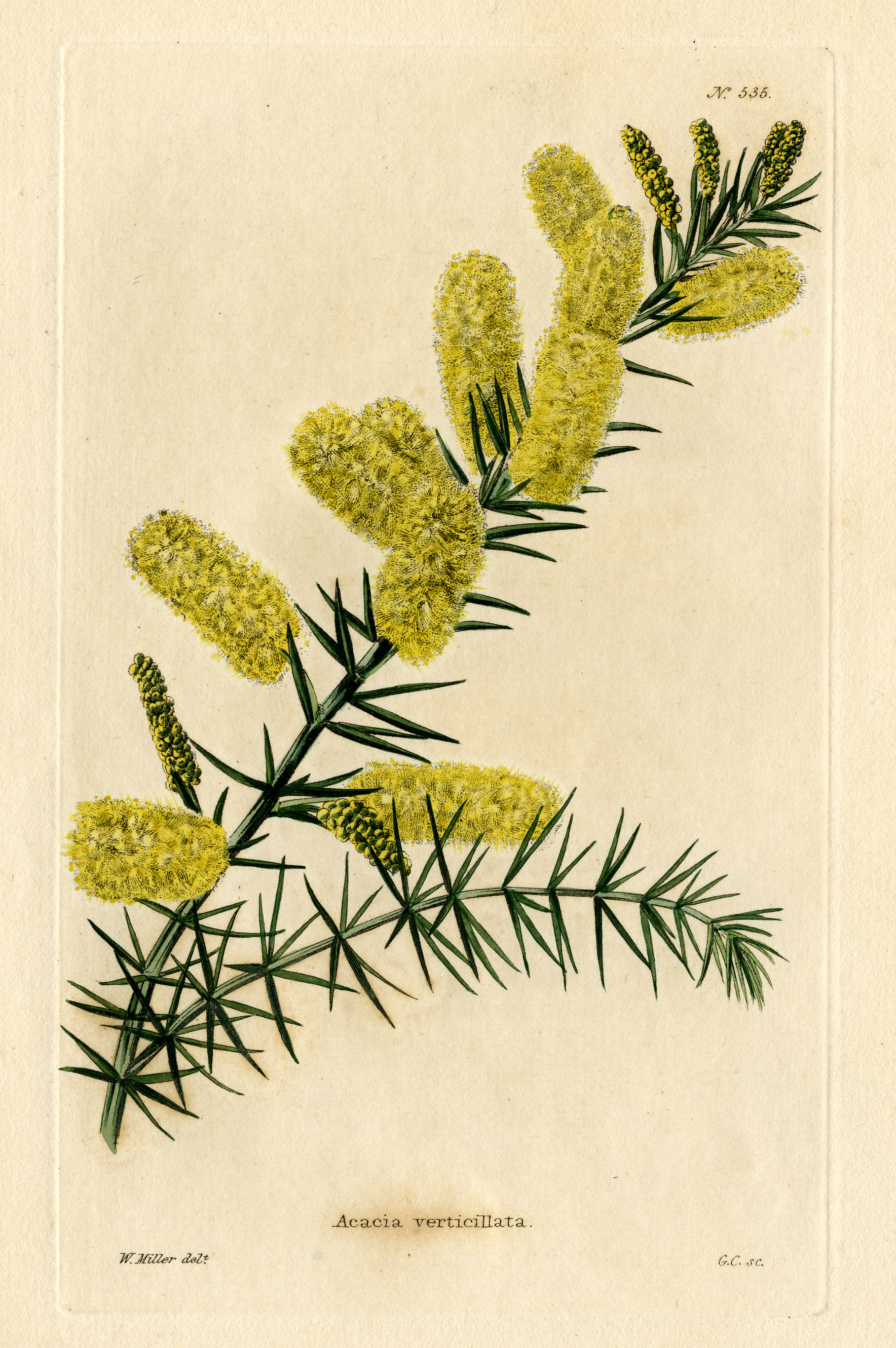
Drawing in The Botanical Cabinet by William Miller
