= Anzac Parade, Sydney =

Road in Sydney, New South Wales, Australia

Anzac Parade New South Wales
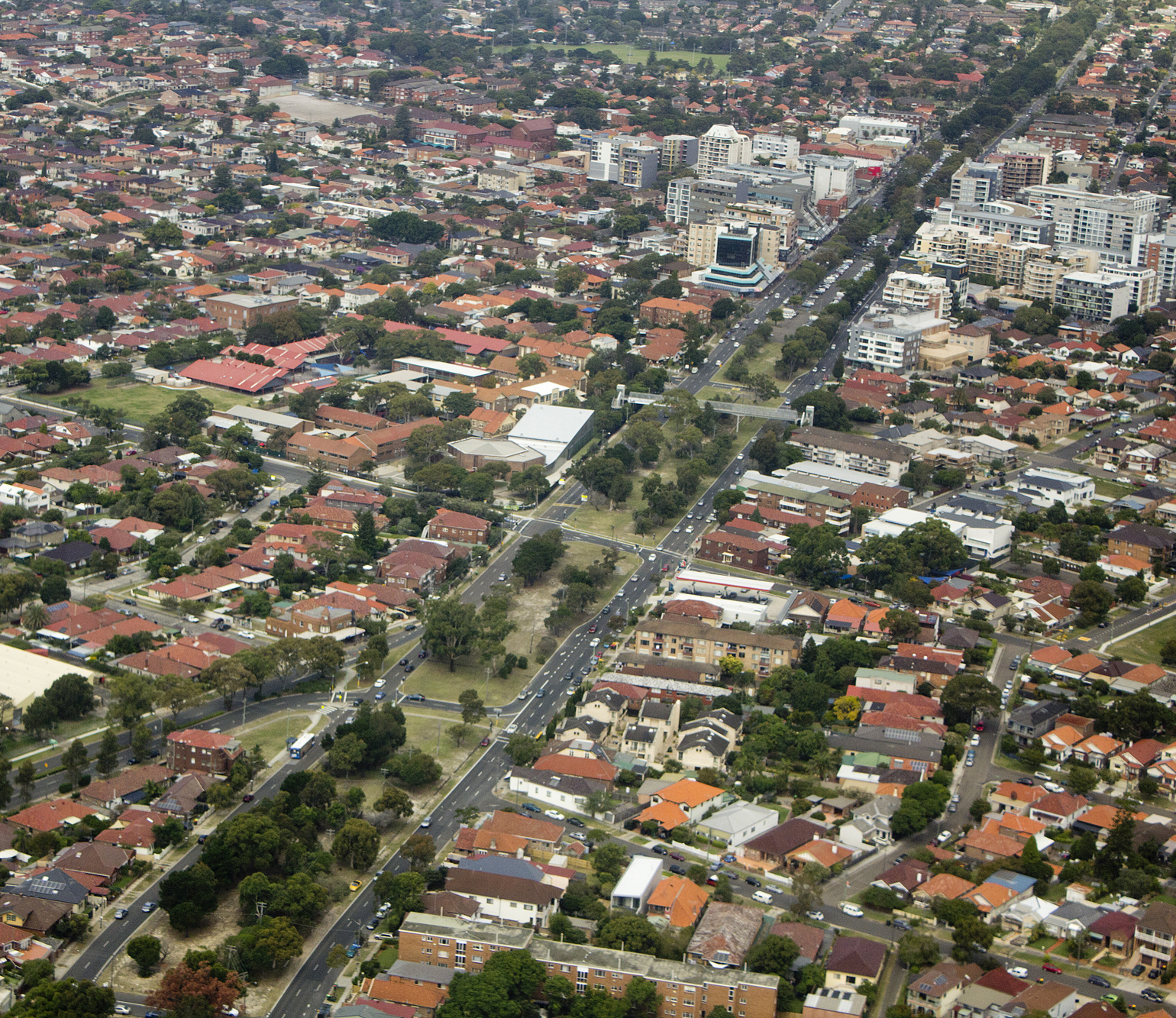
- Anzac Parade through Kingsford and Maroubra.
- Coordinates: 33.886607°S 151.218976°E (North end); 33.987755°S 151.231750°E (South end)

General information
- Type: Road
- Length: 13.5 km (8.4 mi)
- Opened: 1917
- Gazetted: August 1928
- Former route number: State Route 70 (1974–2004)

Major junctions
- North end: Flinders Street; Moore Park, Sydney
- Eastern Distributor; Moore Park Road; Cleveland Street; Allison Road; Gardeners Road; Maroubra Road; Bunnerong Road
- South end: No through road La Perouse, Sydney

Location(s)
- Major suburbs: Kensington, Kingsford, Maroubra, Matraville, Malabar, Chifley, Little Bay

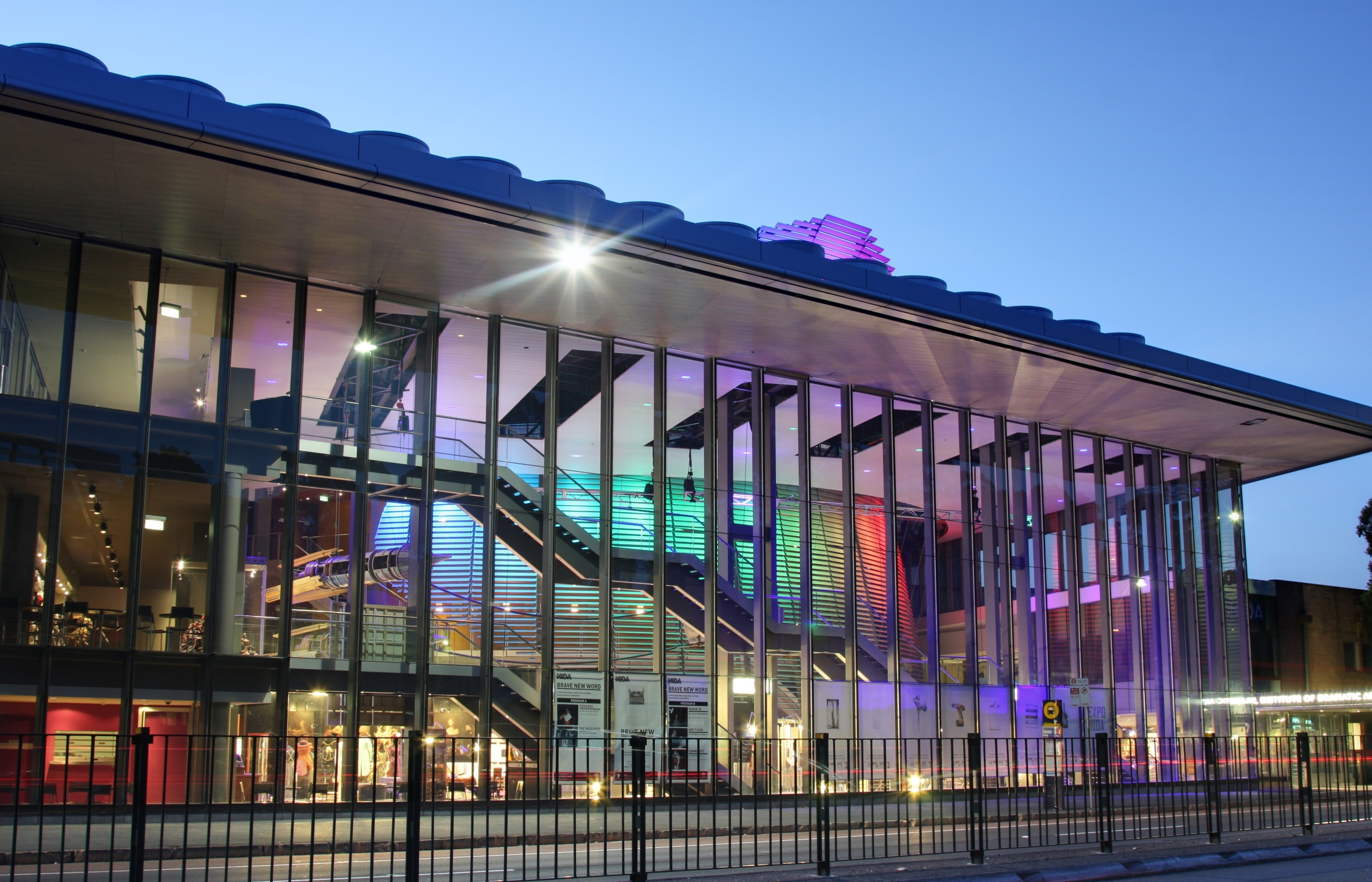
National Institute of Dramatic Art

Anzac Parade is a major road in the south-eastern suburbs of Sydney, New South Wales, Australia which travels south-east from the CBD, named in memory of members of the First Australian Imperial Force (later to become known as Anzacs) who marched down the street from their barracks (now a heritage listed part of the University of New South Wales) to Sydney Harbour, where they were transported to Europe during World War I.

== Route ==
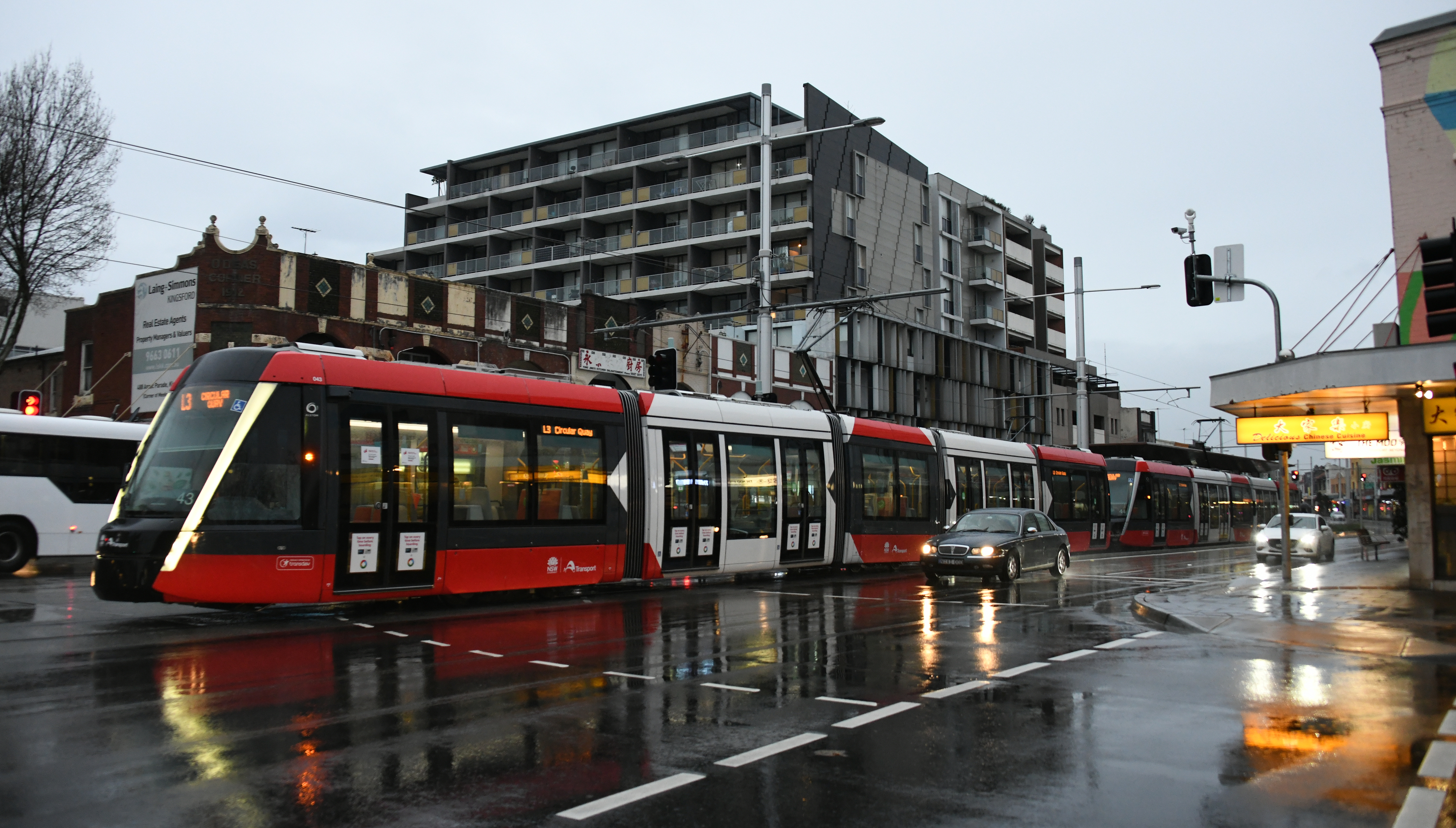
Anzac Parade, Kingsford

Anzac Parade commences to the east of Driver's Triangle (a small park east of the intersection of Moore Park Road and South Dowling Street) at the intersection of Moore Park Road, Flinders Street and the Eastern Distributor at Moore Park and heads in a southerly direction as a six-lane, dual-carriageway road through Kensington, before incorporating a wider central median through the suburbs of Kingsford, Maroubra, Matraville, Malabar, Chifley and Little Bay. It narrows to a two-lane, single carriageway route before ending shortly afterwards at a loop at La Perouse.

Major landmarks along Anzac Parade include the University of New South Wales and National Institute of Dramatic Art in Kensington, as well as Pacific Square in Maroubra.

Anzac Parade included part of the marathon during the 2000 Summer Olympics, and the blue line denoting the marathon's path still exists today.

== History ==
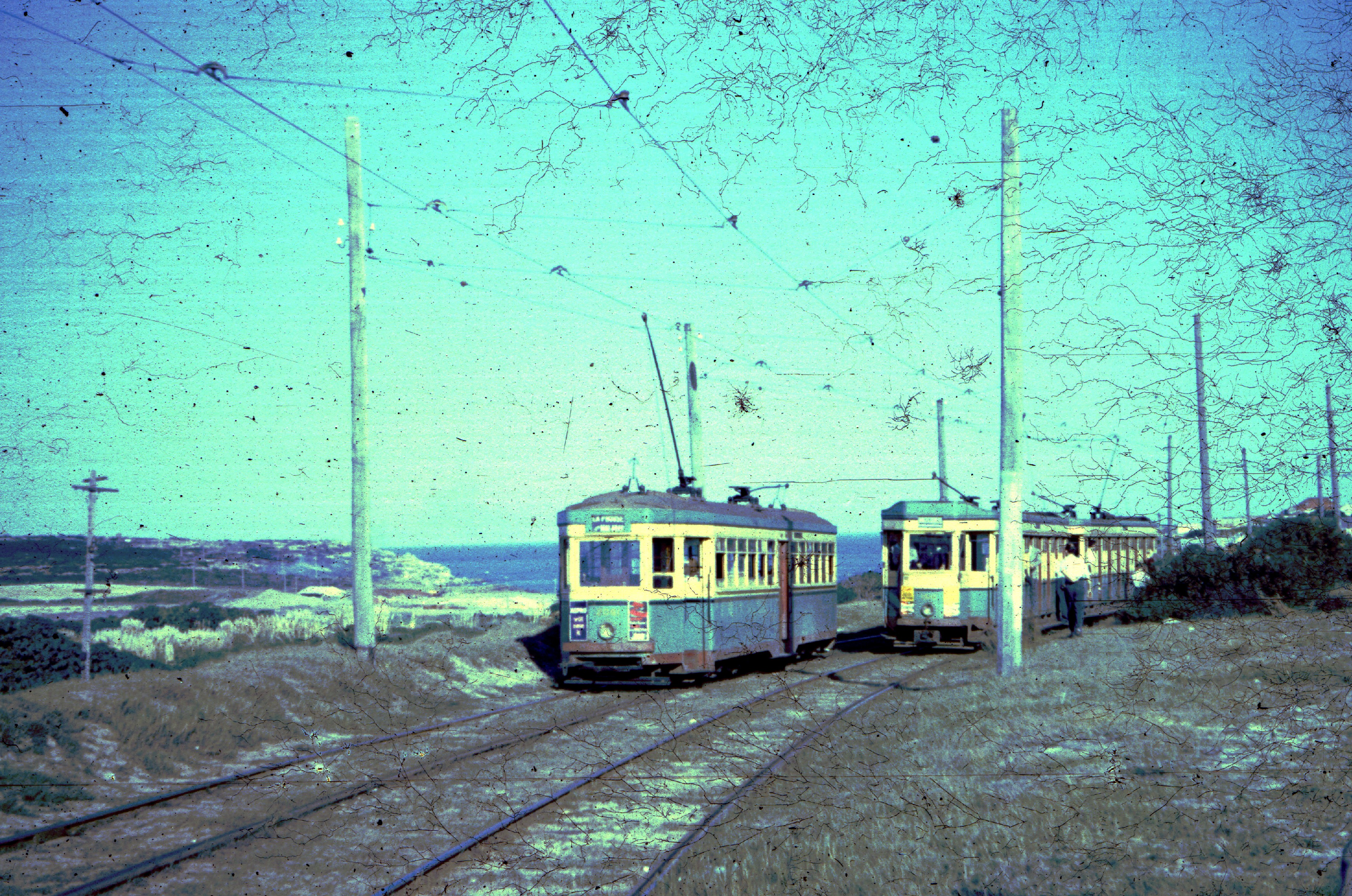
Trams on Anzac Parade, La Perouse, 1960

The passing of the Main Roads Act of 1924 through the Parliament of New South Wales provided for the declaration of Main Roads, roads partially funded by the State government through the Main Roads Board (MRB). Main Road No. 171 was declared along this road on 8 August 1928, from the intersection with Allison Road in Kensington, via Kingsford and Maroubra to La Perouse; with the passing of the Main Roads (Amendment) Act of 1929 to provide for additional declarations of State Highways and Trunk Roads, this was amended to Main Road 171 on 8 April 1929.

The northern end of Main Road 171 was extended further along Anzac Parade to its intersection with Moore Park Road (and continuing further north along Flinders Street to the intersection with Oxford Street at Taylors Square) on 2 December 1964.

In the 1960s, the government contracted the American firm De Leuw, Cather & Company (of Chicago and San Francisco) to design an overpass at the intersection of Anzac Parade, Alison Road, Dacey Avenue and Martin Road. The work of the consultants did not include the detailed design of the bridges.

The passing of the Roads Act of 1993 updated road classifications and the way they could be declared within New South Wales. Under this act, Anzac Parade retains its declaration as part of Main Road 171.

The route was allocated State Route 70 in 1974, but was completely decommissioned in 2004.

In February 2015, the Albert Cotter Bridge across Anzac Parade opened. This pedestrian and cycle bridge was built to improve access to events at the Sydney Cricket Ground and Sydney Football Stadium.

=== Naming ===
Anzac Parade began life as a series of discrete roadways through south-eastern Sydney, which were unified under one name in 1917. These streets were:

- Randwick Road, between Moore Park and Alison roads, Moore Park
- Eastern Avenue, between Alison Road and Lorne Avenue, Kensington
- Bunnerong Road, between Lorne Avenue and Kingsford Nine Ways
- Broad Road, between Nine Ways and the present-day Anzac Parade–Bunnerong Road intersection at Little Bay
- Bunnerong Road, between Little Bay and La Perouse.

Quambi Avenue, which ran between La Perouse tram terminus and the nearby wharf, was added to Anzac Parade in November 1934.

== Public transport ==
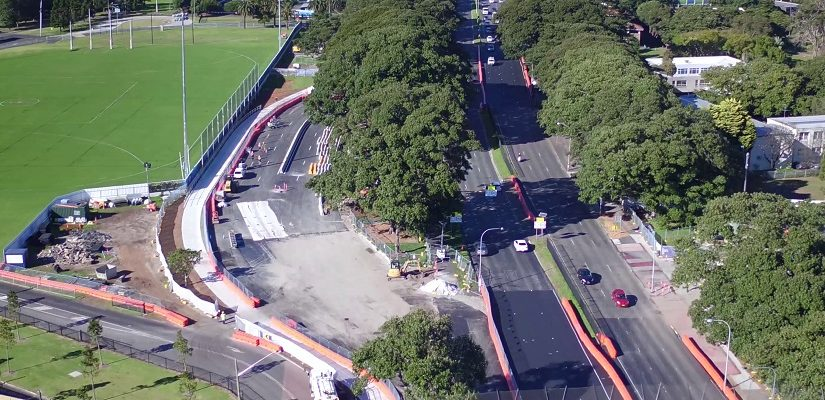
Light rail construction on Anzac Parade in 2016

The road is served by Transdev John Holland bus services, to the city, Railway Square, Bondi Junction, Maroubra, Westfield Eastgardens, Coogee, Little Bay and La Perouse The road also contains a bus-only lane prior to its intersection with Alison Road, as well as a separate parallel bus corridor accompanying its route through Moore Park. It is one of the busiest road based public transport routes in Sydney.

In 2015, construction of the CBD and South East Light Rail commenced. Running from Circular Quay down George Street to Central station, it then crosses Moore Park and follows Anzac Parade. South of Moore Park the line splits into two branches – one continuing down Anzac Parade to Kingsford which opened in 2020, and the second heading to Randwick via Alison Road which opened in 2019. In April 2016, work began on a temporary six-lane diversion of Anzac Parade between the Albert Cotter Bridge and Lang Road while a tunnel was built below the road. Traffic was directed on to the temporary road from mid-2016. The original alignment was reinstated in April 2017.

South of Kingsford, Anzac Parade is a divided road with a wide grassy median strip. This median strip was formerly used by a tram service. The line was closed in 1961, when the route was replaced by buses.

== Major intersections ==
LGA	Location	km	mi	Destinations	Notes
Sydney	Paddington–Moore Park boundary	0.0	0.0	Flinders Street - Darlinghurst	Northern terminus of road
Sydney	Paddington–Moore Park boundary	0.0	0.0	Eastern Distributor (M1 north) - North Sydney, Lane Cove	Northbound entrance only
Sydney	Paddington–Moore Park boundary	0.0	0.0	Moore Park Road - Surry Hills, Woollahra	
Sydney	Moore Park	0.3	0.19	Eastern Distributor (M1 north) - North Sydney, Lane Cove	Southbound exit only
Sydney	Moore Park	1.0	0.62	Cleveland Street (west) - Surry Hills, Chippendale; Lang Road (east) - Woollahra	
Sydney–Randwick boundary	Moore Park–Centennial Park–Kensington tripoint	1.7	1.1	Dacey Avenue (west) – Waterloo; Allison Road (east) - Randwick, Coogee	
Randwick	Kingsford	4.4	2.7	Gardeners Road (west) – Rosebery, St Peters; Rainbow Street (east) - South Coogee	
Randwick	Maroubra	6.7	4.2	Maroubra Road - Pagewood, South Coogee	
Randwick	Phillip Bay–Little Bay boundary	12.2	7.6	Bunnerong Road - Matraville	
Randwick	La Perouse	13.5	8.4	No through road	Southern terminus of road
Incomplete access; Tolled; Route transition
