= Malabar Beach =

Beach in Sydney, Australia

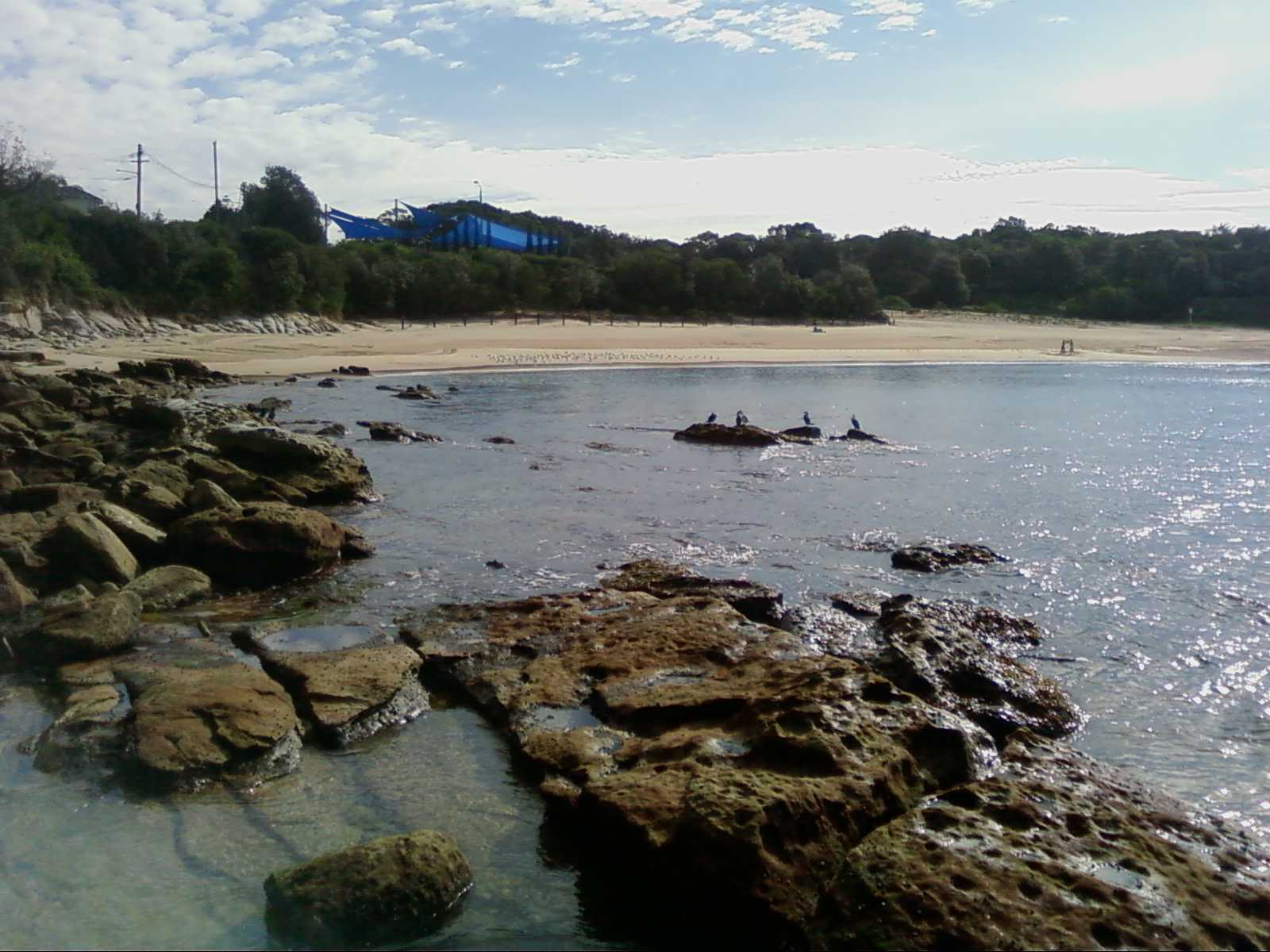
Photo of Malabar Beach taken from the rocks on the south side of the bay. 27 July 2015

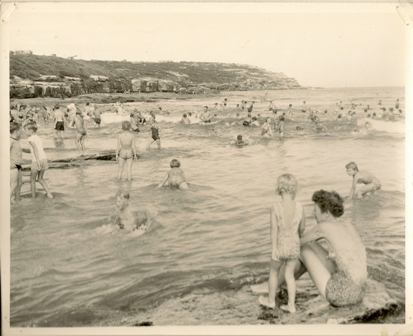
Children swimming at Malabar Beach, 1950s. Courtesy Ray Mascord.

Malabar Beach is a beach in Malabar, Sydney, New South Wales, Australia, located to the south of Maroubra Beach and to the north of Little Bay and La Perouse. The Randwick Golf Club is located on the cliffs on the right side and Malabar Headland on the cliffs on the left side. Its sands stretch for about 200 metres. Two boat ramps can be found towards both ends of the beach, as well as a rock pool further south, below Randwick Golf Club.

== History ==
Malabar Beach was previously known as Long Bay beach. Following a petition by local residents, the new name was gazetted on 29 September 1933, following a shipwreck of the MV Malabar in 1931. There also have been four other shipwrecks on the headland - the St Albans in 1882, Try One in 1947 and SS Goolgwai in 1955 (and an unnamed barge in 1955).

Malabar Beach suffered issues with water pollution that affected health of the swimmers. For example, there was an outbreak of typhoid in one family who swam at Malabar Beach regularly. In 1957, 300 residents had a protest meeting in Cromwell Park nearby to raise the issue of the beach water pollution to the Sydney Water Board. In 1992 a marine outfall started pumping the sewage 4.2 km out to the sea, and water quality improved dramatically. Randwick Council lifeguards started patrolling the beach, and a playground and barbecue were installed in Cromwell Park.

== Geography ==
The rocky headland on the left of the bay or the cliff, protect the beach from the waves so the water is very calm so swimming, snorkelling, scuba diving, kayaking and paddle boarding is easy to do at Malabar Beach although it gets deep suddenly. The beach is also shaped like a dolphin.

== Dangers ==
In the waters swim colourful fish but also small stingrays and blue ringed octopuses which lurk the waters. Malabar Beach is not patrolled with lifeguards or lifesavers although there is a lifeguard tower there.
