= Prince Henry Hospital =

Prince Henry Hospital site
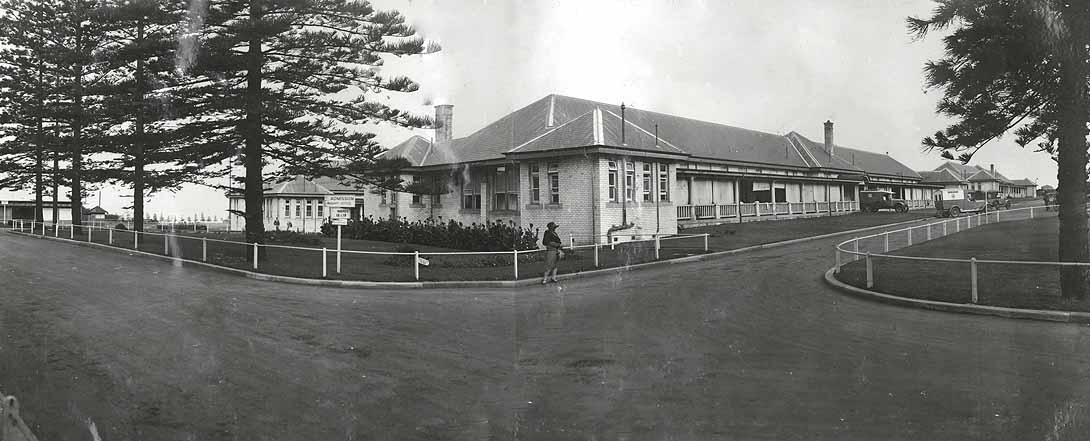
- Portion of the former Coast Hospital, undated.

- Location within inner Sydney
- 33°58′51″S 151°15′02″E
- Location: 1430 Anzac Parade, Little Bay, City of Randwick, New South Wales, Australia

History
- Built: 1881–

Site notes
- Architect(s): NSW Colonial Architect; NSW Government Architect
- Owner: Landcom

New South Wales Heritage Register
- Official name: Prince Henry Site; Prince Henry Hospital; The Coast Hospital
- Type: State heritage (complex / group)
- Designated: 2 May 2003
- Reference no.: 1651
- Type: Hospital
- Category: Health Services
- Builders: NSW Public Works Department

The Prince Henry Hospital site, formerly known as the Prince Henry Hospital, Sydney, is a heritage-listed former teaching hospital and infectious diseases hospital and now UNSW teaching hospital and spinal rehabilitation unit located at 1430 Anzac Parade in the suburb of Little Bay in Sydney, New South Wales, Australia. It was designed by NSW NSW Colonial Architect and NSW Government Architect and built from 1881 by NSW Public Works Department. It is also known as Prince Henry Hospital and The Coast Hospital. The property is owned by Landcom, an agency of the Government of New South Wales. It was added to the New South Wales State Heritage Register on 2 May 2003.

== History ==
=== Aboriginal historical context ===
The greater Sydney region has been inhabited by Aboriginal people for at least 20,000 years with dated sheltered occupation sites occurring in the Blue Mountains and its foothills. Aboriginal occupation of coastal NSW has also been dated to extend back to at least 20,000 years before present at Burrill Lake on the South Coast and 17,000 years before present at Bass Point. At the time of these periods of occupation, both sites would have been located within hinterland areas situated some distance away from the coast. In the case of Burrill Lake, the sea would have been up to 16 km further east than at present and the site would have been located within an inland environment drained by rivers, creeks and streams.

There are no other Pleistocene sites recorded on the Sydney Coast. There are however two sites that have been dated to the early Holocene around 7,000 to 8,000 years ago. These are located at the current Prince of Wales Hospital site (a hearth dated to 7,800 years ago) and a rock shelter site at Curracurrang. It is likely that many coastal Aboriginal sites of a similar age within the Sydney region have been submerged and/or destroyed by sea-level changes which have occurred in eastern Australia during the last 20,000 years. In general terms, the majority of sites recorded within the Sydney Basin investigated to the present are dated to within the last 2,500 years that in most cases demonstrate Aboriginal exploitation of marine resources at the current sea levels.

Available evidence indicates that Aboriginal occupation of the Sydney region was initially sporadic, and that population numbers were fairly low during the earliest periods. From around 5,000 years ago an increasing and continued use of many sites investigated through archaeology appears to have ensued. Evidence for the Aboriginal use and occupation of the Sydney region from this period is therefore far more "archaeologically visible" than for previous periods.

In the South Sydney region at least three archaeological sites have produced dates of Aboriginal occupation that range from between 3,000 and 5,000 years ago. From about 3,000 years ago to Contact the number of occupied sites appears to have increased dramatically. This may reflect a "real" increase in the number of sites (and hence people) in the region, or may reflect preservation factors (particularly associated with shell midden deposits) where older sites have been destroyed by thousands of years of erosion, and accelerated by development in the post-Contact period.

Over the 20,000 years of Aboriginal occupation in the region, and in particular the last 5,000 to 8,000 years, numerous changes in excavated stone tool assemblages have been observed. Various temporal markers have been established by archaeologist in an attempt to distinguish what are considered to be the more significant changes in tool types and tool kit composition. The assumption being that changes in one (or more) components of the excavated material culture may reflect changes in other aspects of past Aboriginal social, economic and technological practices.

These arguments are based upon changes in stone tool assemblages and observable changes in the use of certain types of stone used in Aboriginal tool manufacture. Excavation of a number of rock-shelter occupation sites in particular indicates that the earlier phases of occupation are largely characterised by the presence of large cores and scraper tools. This appears to be followed by the addition of a variety of smaller backed implements (known variously as backed blades, geometric microliths or Bondi Points) to the toolkit previously dominated by larger tools at around 5,000 years ago. By around 1,500 years ago the smaller backed forms appear (on available evidence) to have gone out of use and excavated site assemblages are characterised by quartz bi-polar artefacts and more opportunistic or undifferentiated small tools. It is reasonable to assume that the many artefacts made by Aboriginal people from shell, bone or wood as observed at Contact were also used in the past but these materials have not survived in the archaeological record.

Research indicates that coastal sites in the Sydney region have been largely ignored by archaeologists until relatively recently. Prior to work completed over the last two decades, the majority of Aboriginal archaeological sites investigated were located south of Sydney and the Georges River. Previous focus of investigations was frequently on the stone artefacts made by Aboriginal people in the past, the sequence of changes in their form and composition, and upon comparisons between coastal and inland sites that sought to understand how people used the landscape as a means to characterise Aboriginal life on the eastern coast of NSW prior to Contact. More recent archaeological studies have focused upon the way Aboriginal people adapted to the coastal environment and the immediate hinterland, and how other aspects of the archaeological record (such as food, art, site complexity and composition, and site distribution data) can contribute to our understanding of prehistoric Aboriginal life.

=== Colonial history ===
One of the earliest land grants in this area was made in 1824 to Captain Francis Marsh, who received 12 acres bounded by the present Botany and High Streets, Alison and Belmore Roads. In 1839 William Newcombe acquired the land north-west of the present town hall in Avoca Street.

Randwick takes its name from the town of Randwick, Gloucestershire, England. The name was suggested by Simeon Pearce (1821–86) and his brother James. Simeon was born in the English Randwick and the brothers were responsible for the early development of both Randwick and its neighbour, Coogee. Simeon had come to the colony in 1841as a 21 year old surveyor. He built his Blenheim House on the 4 acres he bought from Marsh, and called his property "Randwick". The brothers bought and sold land profitably in the area and elsewhere. Simeon campaigned for construction of a road from the city to Coogee (achieved in 1853) and promoted the incorporation of the suburb. Pearce sought construction of a church modelled on the church of St. John in his birthplace. In 1857 the first St Jude's stood on the site of the present post office, at the corner of the present Alison Road and Avoca Street.

Randwick was slow to progress. The village was isolated from Sydney by swamps and sandhills, and although a horse-drawn omnibus was operated by a man named Grice from the late 1850s, the journey was more a test of nerves than a pleasure jaunt. Wind blew sand over the track, and the bus sometimes became bogged, so that passengers had to get out and push it free. From its early days Randwick had a divided society. The wealthy lived elegantly in large houses built when Pearce promoted Randwick and Coogee as a fashionable area. But the market gardens, orchards and piggeries that continued alongside the large estates were the lot of the working class. Even on the later estates that became racing empires, many jockeys and stablehands lived in huts or even under canvas. An even poorer group were the immigrants who existed on the periphery of Randwick in a place called Irishtown, in the area now known as The Spot, around the junction of St.Paul's Street and Perouse Road. Here families lived in makeshift houses, taking on the most menial tasks in their struggle to survive.

In 1858 when the NSW Government passed the Municipalities Act, enabling formation of municipal districts empowered to collect rates and borrow money to improve their suburb, Randwick was the first suburb to apply for the status of a municipality. It was approved in February 1859, and its first Council was elected in March 1859.

Randwick had been the venue for sporting events, as well as duels and illegal sports, from the early days in the colony's history. Its first racecourse, the Sandy Racecourse or Old Sand Track, had been a hazardous track over hills and gullies since 1860. When a move was made in 1863 by John Tait, to establish Randwick Racecourse, Simeon Pearce was furious, especially when he heard that Tait also intended to move into Byron Lodge. Tait's venture prospered, however and he became the first person in Australia to organise racing as a commercial sport. The racecourse made a big difference to the progress of Randwick. The horse-drawn omnibus gave way to trams that linked the suburb to Sydney and civilisation. Randwick soon became a prosperous and lively place, and it still retains a busy residential, professional and commercial life.

Today, some of the houses have been replaced by home units. Many European migrants have made their homes in the area, along with students and workers at the nearby University of NSW and the Prince of Wales Hospital.

=== The choice of a site for The Coast Hospital ===
The Prince Henry Hospital and former Coast Hospital at Little Bay represent an important phase in the provision of public health in New South Wales and Australia. Established by the Board of Health in 1881, in response to an outbreak of smallpox, the hospital was the first government-controlled public hospital in the post-convict era. The Board of Health, forerunner to the Department of Health, was created initially to deal with the smallpox outbreak of 1881. The Board of Health and New South Wales government's involvement in the early administration at the hospital empowered both organisations in their dealings with other New South Wales private hospitals in the late nineteenth and early twentieth century. It also laid the foundations for the administrative policies in regard to hospitals that became standard within the system.

The location of the Coast Hospital was a reflection of the prevailing beliefs with regard to the treatment of infectious disease and in health care generally. Fear of infectious diseases in the nineteenth century meant that those diagnosed or suspected of having infection were geographically isolated and removed from the general population. At the same time, fresh ocean air was considered highly beneficial in the treatment of disease. The Coast Hospital was built with both these ideals in mind. Not only was the original hospital well removed from the populated areas in Sydney, but within the grounds of the institution, the patients were duly separated depending on their ailment. The main section was located on the southern headland of Little Bay where maximum exposure to the elements was assured.

The isolated nature of the Coast Hospital also led to the establishment of the first complete ambulance service in New South Wales and a forerunner of permanent ambulance services throughout the entire country.

The Coast Hospital cemetery was the second burial place for the hospital, between 1897 and 1952. It was not within the grounds itself, but away to the south in an isolated position to minimise the spread of disease. The cemetery has ongoing significance for the Aboriginal community as the Dharawal Resting Place, where ancestral remains of the La Perouse Aboriginal people, returned from both Australian and international museums, can be returned to country and buried. The first reburial took place in June 2002. The cemetery is now within Botany Bay National Park and pressed by golf courses.

=== Prince Henry Hospital ===
As the isolation of the hospital was gradually reduced, through the encroachment of Sydney's suburbs and improvement in transport facilities, the demand for the services of the hospital grew. The first years of the twentieth century reflected this change as a major building program was initiated at the hospital.

The proposal for the construction of up to 20 new wards between 1914 and 1920 reflected a growing community belief that the provision of public health was a universal right to those in the community - a view held by the then New South Wales government and the Minister for Health, Fred Flowers. The new wards built on the slope to the west, away from the original coast section, were named the Flowers Hospital after the minister.

The overall redevelopment, wards, theatres and auxiliary rooms meant that by 1929 the hospital was the largest in NSW. In 1934 the hospital was renamed the Prince Henry Hospital in honour of the recent visit by Prince Henry, Duke of Gloucester. The establishment of the hospital originally as an infectious disease hospital allowed it to develop an expertise in the diagnosis and treatment of infectious diseases that stayed with the facility throughout its operation. Its almost continual use as an infectious disease hospital since its opening provides valuable evidence of the community's attitude, and an official attitude, to the treatment of infectious diseases.

New techniques for the diagnosis and treatment of infection and research into disease were a specialist function of the hospital as a unit. The expertise of the staff who were stationed at the hospital in diagnosis and treatment made them highly valued at other institutions around the country and gained the hospital a worldwide reputation. The training of nurses at the hospital had been standard practice since 1894, while from 1937 all nurses were required to spend two months training in the Nurses Preliminary Training School before entering the wards.

During the same period (1936) the hospital was chosen by the New South Wales Postgraduate Committee as an official postgraduate teaching hospital. A postgraduate medical school was opened in 1938, although it only operated until 1943, and was finally abandoned due to wartime restrictions on staff and services. In 1960, the hospital became the first teaching hospital for the newly created University of NSW.

The hospital's expertise and specialisation extended beyond the infectious disease wards and the training facilities. Specialist services were offered to treat soldiers during the early years of the Second World War, including the first of the American troops to land in Sydney (before the American military established their own hospitals). In 1946 a special police ward was created to treat those members of the police force who needed treatment; while on the other side of the law, one ward in the Delaney House was converted and secured to treat prisoners from Long Bay Gaol. (The link between the hospital and Long Bay Gaol also included the excellent bread baked and delivered daily to Prince Henry Hospital).

=== People at Prince Henry Hospital ===
Part of the hospital's reputation has come from its association with prominent medical professionals and administrators who have worked there over the years. Some have been remembered in the naming of buildings on site after them, including Matron E McNevin, Matron CM Dickson, FW Marks, Bob Heffron, and JE Delaney. Both Matron McNevin and Matron Dickson were honoured through the naming of the two main nurses' homes after them.

Matron Clarice Dickson had served at the Coast Hospital since 1909 when she joined the nursing staff. She went to France during World War I to serve for the Red Cross and was awarded a medal for courageous dedication to duty under fire. She returned to the Coast Hospital in 1920 as Sub-Matron, but transferred to Newington State Hospital in 1926 for six months before returning to the Coast Hospital as Sub-Matron in 1927. She became Matron of Prince Henry Hospital in 1936 and retired in 1937. The new nurses' home was named after her on her retirement.

Matron Dickson was followed by Ethel McNevin as Matron of Prince Henry Hospital. Matron McNevin had arrived at the Coast Hospital in 1915 as a trainee, and served at the hospital until 1926 when she resigned to become Matron of Coonamble District Hospital. In 1928 she was appointed Matron of the Perth Hospital in Western Australia. She returned to Prince Henry Hospital in 1937 as Matron, a position in which she served until her retirement in September 1955. During her time as Matron, McNevin introduced the Nurses Preliminary Training School in which new nurses would spend two months learning the basics of the profession before transferring to the wards. The school became an integral part of the nursing experience at Prince Henry Hospital. Following her retirement, Matron McNevin returned to Prince Henry Hospital as the librarian in the Medical Library and lived in a small flat in the Matron Dickson Nurses Home. She died at the hospital in July 1960.

Both Heffron and Marks had served on the Board of Directors for the hospital as directors. Bob Heffron, MLA, was appointed to the Board in 1942 and was Chairman of the Board between September 1950 and November 1959. He served as the local member for Botany from 1930 and as NSW Premier between 1959 and 1964. The new Ward Block A was named after him in 1961 in recognition of his seventeen years of service on the Hospital Board. FW Marks was Chairman of the Board between 1936 until his death in 1942. The contribution of the Marks family was recognised by the naming of the new infectious diseases ward the FW Marks Pavilion. Other members of staff left lasting impressions on the hospital through their devotion to the patients and staff while they were in residence.

Dr CJM "Cec" Walters, who served as the Medical Superintendent of Prince Henry Hospital from October 1936 until December 1959, is fondly remembered by many ex-staff for his loyalty to the hospital and devotion to duty. Dr Walters started his career as a veterinary surgeon in 1913, before enlisting in 1914 and serving in mobile veterinary hospitals in France, including in command positions. On his return to Australia he was appointed in charge of the Veterinary Clinic at Sydney University. In 1923 he graduated from the School of Medicine and came to work at the Coast Hospital in 1924 where he remained, except for a brief period as a Macquarie Street specialist, until 1959. Throughout this time he continued to practice as a veterinary surgeon, working from time to time on the thoroughbreds in Vic Field's stable at Randwick Racecourse.

John E. Delaney became Chief Executive Officer in 1973, succeeding J. R. Clancy, a cousin of the former Catholic Archbishop of Sydney, Cardinal Clancy. Delaney is remembered as a fine administrator who fought for a dual carriageway along Anzac Parade to the Prince Henry site.

The work of Dr Neville Stanley is remembered in association with the Pathology Building, which was named after benefactors Hugh and Catherine McIlrath. His virus research team achieved national prominence in Australia, in relation to research into viral meningitis and the polio virus.

=== The closure of Prince Henry Hospital ===
The closure of the Prince Henry Hospital was announced in September 1988. The facilities were to be slowly relocated to the Prince of Wales Hospital, forming a "super hospital" on the proceeds of the sale of Prince Henry Hospital. However, prior to the official announcement, since the early 1970s, the services offered by Prince Henry had been slowly withdrawn. From 1984 the future of the hospital was being continually reassessed. A lack of funds for capital works and the uncertainty over its future resulted in many of the buildings becoming run-down across the site. Following the official announcement of its closure, services continued to be downgraded, wards closed and staff relocated. There are few working precincts remaining on the Prince Henry site as of May 2002.

The Prince Henry Hospital grew to provide a range of medical services on the site. The hospital became a major teaching hospital, operating at its peak in the mid 1980s. Since that time, as a result of state government policy, which focused on the consolidation of health services at other hospitals, the Prince Henry Hospital has been progressively closed. In 1999 the Minister for Health announced the transfer of the remaining hospital services to the Prince of Wales Hospital at Randwick. The redevelopment of the Prince Henry site was also announced, to provide private housing, aged care housing and selected medical services. This redevelopment was to include the restoration of heritage buildings on the site.

A two-staged approach to the preparation of a Conservation Management Plan was agreed with the then NSW Heritage Office and Randwick City Council to guide the Prince Henry site Masterplan. A Stage 2 Conservation Management Plan, dated May 2002 (amended February 2003) including Archaeological Management Plan, dated August 2002 was endorsed by the Heritage Council on 27 June 2003.

The Prince Henry Masterplan was approved by the Heritage Council Approvals Committee in December 2001. In September 2002, the Heritage Council recommended to the Minister that the site be listed on the State Heritage Register. The site was listed on 2 May 2003.

The revised Masterplan was approved by the Heritage Council in May 2003. Heritage Council general terms of approval were issued for a Stage 1 infrastructure IDA in 2003. Heritage Council general terms of approval were issued in March 2004 for DA7 for amalgamation of parts of Anzac Parade with the site and community title subdivision of site to create 27 allotments. An integrated development application 1103/2003, DA7 for the land management regime for Prince Henry Hospital site was established as a "Community Scheme" for the entire site. Site Masterplan amendments were approved on 6 October 2005.

== Description ==
=== Site ===
The Prince Henry site contains a variety of buildings in an open landscape setting, as well as archaeological features and artefacts that provide evidence of its continuous use as a hospital for over 120 years.

Natural landscape elements such as the Little Bay Geological Site, areas of sandstone outcropping and indigenous vegetation have been overlaid by numerous cultural landscape elements such as cultural plantings (several species of Phoenix palms, banksias and Norfolk Island pines) and retaining walls and rock cuttings. There are significant views from the site towards Little Bay and the coastal headlands as well as major visual axes along Pine Avenue and between the Flowers Wards.

The existing buildings and structures, relate to the four key phases of development at the Prince Henry site and include elements that represent each of the major building types. These include hospital wards and operating theatres, specialist and research facilities, administration buildings, nurses and doctors' quarters, maintenance and services as well as laundry, kitchen and education facilities.

Below is a list of built and landscape elements of particular significance at the Prince Henry Site, Little Bay (see also attached plans):

=== Historic precinct ===
This includes a collection of significant built and landscape elements relating to the development of the Coast Hospital and Prince Henry Hospital and their settings. Centred on Pine Avenue, it includes historic roads, cultural plantings, rock cuttings and outcrops, kerbs, retaining walls, spatial relationships between buildings and groups, and views within and beyond the precinct;

- Entrance Gates, Gateposts and Gatehouse and Entrance to Pine Avenue;
- Pine Avenue, including retaining wall, avenue of Cook's pines (Araucaria columnaris) and ornamental plantings;
- Ensemble of Water Tower, Wishing Well, World War II Memorial Clock Tower and their Pine Avenue setting;
- Henry's Trading Post/Emergency Service Store (former Coast Hospital Pathology Laboratory);
- Former Pathology Department building and adjacent former water reservoir;
- Former Matron Dickson Nurses Home, including courtyard, associated retaining walls, pathway, steps, ornamental and indigenous plantings;
- Former Nurses Dining Room and Matron's Office/Nurses Lecture Hall;
- Pine Cottage and its setting;
- Coral Avenue, including ornamental plantings;
- Interdenominational Australian Nurses War Memorial Chapel and its setting;
- Storage Shed/former Motor Garage and its setting;
- BJ Heffron House (Block A), Delaney Building (Block B) and their setting, including adjacent historic road alignment and ornamental plantings;
- Former Artisans' Cottages No 4 and No 5, No 6 and No 7, No 8 and No 9 and their setting, including associated garages and ornamental plantings and historic road alignment;
- Former Institute of Tropical Medicine complex (Ward 16, Kitchen and Boiler House) and its setting, including sandstone retaining walls and ornamental plantings;
- The Flowers Ward Group, including former Flowers Wards, the former 'Hill Theatres' and their setting, including historic road alignments, sandstone kerbing, sandstone Rock Cutting, Foundation Stone, ornamental plantings and views and vistas;
- The Coast Golf and Recreation Club Clubhouse (former Coast Hospital Steam Laundry);
- Former Coast Hospital Water Tower;
- The Pond and associated watercourse;

Little Bay Beach, adjoining Headlands of Little Bay and Coastline, including coastal views and scenery;

- Tennis Court and Entrance to former Chief Executive Officer's (CEO) residence;
- The North Cemetery including its curtilage and setting;
- Wetlands;
- Little Bay Geological Site including Critical Exposure Area and Cleared Area, within the Prince Henry site and University of NSW Lands and possible extent of Palaeovalley;

Former Male Lazaret site, including sandstone wall, sandstone drain/culvert and ornamental palm;

- Ornamental plantings located throughout Prince Henry site;
- Areas of indigenous vegetation located throughout Prince Henry site;
- Sandstone elements, including rock outcrops, the Rock Cutting, kerbs and quarried sandstone; and
- Significant retaining walls located throughout the Prince Henry site; and
- Historic road alignments.

=== Moveable heritage ===
A number of movable items relating to the cultural history of the hospital, particularly the history of medical treatment, technological development and nursing care on the site from 1881, have been collected within the PHHTNA Museum (Prince Henry Hospital Nursing and Medical Museum) and have been identified in the Museum Plan. Other movable items, ranging from medical equipment to garage doors are located throughout the Prince Henry site. They are identified in the Conservation Management Plan.

- Coast Hospital Cemetery, Little Bay

Burials: 1897–1952

Dharawal Resting Place: 2002–present

Nestled in the cliffs of Little Bay, the cemetery is poignant reminder of the devastating effects of epidemics in Sydney. The Coast Hospital was established in 1881 during the smallpox epidemic. This cemetery was the second burial place for the hospital, between 1897 and 1952. It was not within the hospital grounds itself, but away to the south in an isolated position to minimise the spread of disease. There is still a visual link between cemetery and hospital across the cliffs. Scattered monuments remain amongst mown grass. Some graves are marked by kerbing, one by a small timber picket fence. The majority of graves are unmarked: it is estimated there are over 2000 burials here. Only 78 graves are still visible. A row of grave markers to nurses and staff is on the right as you enter. There are two simple Gothic arch headstones to Chinamen, Ton Dong (d.1902) and Ah Wong (d.1902), both of the plague. The most unusual are two matching grave markers to the Rouse family, Enid Pearl (d.1907) and her mother Alice (d.1917). A semicircular barrel-top sarcophagus covered in tiles defines each grave plot: a sandstone headstone the inscription. Each is enclosed in matching cast-iron fences. Executed by monumental mason James Cunningham, Sydney, this style of funerary monument is rarely seen in NSW. The cemetery has ongoing significance for the Aboriginal community as the Dharawal Resting Place, where ancestral remains of the La Perouse Aboriginal people, returned from both Australian and international museums, can be returned to country and buried. The first reburial took place in June 2002. The cemetery is now within Botany Bay National Park and pressed by golf courses.

=== Condition ===
As at 14 July 2003, Evidence of Aboriginal occupation prior to the establishment of the Coast Hospital in 1881 includes a diverse collection of prehistoric Aboriginal sites, such as open and sheltered middens, open campsites, rock engravings, axe-grinding grooves and pathways, a possible fish trap and ochre source. The area also retains the potential to contain previously unidentified Aboriginal artefacts and significant sites (see attached plans).

Identified Aboriginal Archaeological sites located within the existing boundaries of the Prince Henry site are:

1. Little Bay 5: Sheltered midden on Little Bay, disturbed, prehistoric.
2. Little Bay 6: Open midden on Little Bay, disturbed, prehistoric.
3. Little Bay 7: Axe grinding grooves, Coast Golf Course, undisturbed, prehistoric.
4. Little Bay 8 and 9: Rock engravings, Coast Golf Course, unlocated, possibly undisturbed, prehistoric.
5. Little Bay 10: Leprosy Lazaret, Coast Golf Course, possibly moderately disturbed, from c. 1890s.
6. Potential Ochre Site: Prince Henry northern land boundary, likely to be disturbed, date unknown (not registered).
7. The Tram Loop: Socially significant site located in bushland to be preserved in southwest of site (not registered).
8. Potential Fish Trap: Possibly prehistoric or post-Contact period, modified, but currently in good condition (not registered).

The following types of Aboriginal archaeological sites may potentially remain undetected within the Prince Henry site:

1. Open Middens that may occur along the clifflines that now form part of the Coast Golf Course or along the banks of the various watercourses that drain into Little Bay;
2. Open Campsites or isolated finds of durable material, such as flaked and ground stone. The presence of manuports stone raw materials also needs to be considered; the foreshore areas of Little Bay and the banks of the freshwater creeklines that traverse the Prince Henry site are considered to be particularly sensitive;
3. Rock Engravings that may be present upon any of the open and relatively flat areas of sandstone that are present (or remain buried) within the study area;
4. Axe/Hatchet Grinding Grooves, such as those that have been recorded with moderate frequency in the surrounding region; and
5. Burial Sites that may relate to the prehistoric period of Aboriginal occupation of the Little bay area, along with post-Contact periods, perhaps associated with the impact smallpox had on the Aboriginal community following the arrival of La Perouse in 1788.

The Prince Henry site has known archaeological potential as the first post-convict era hospital in NSW.

Prince Henry also contains archaeological evidence of former activities associated with the use of the site for hospital services over the last 120 years. This archaeological evidence is primarily associated with the original Coast Hospital, located on the south headland of Little Bay and the Male Lazaret to the north of Little Bay. It also provides some evidence of the later Prince Henry Hospital, which developed nearer to Anzac Parade to the north and south of Pine Avenue (see attached plans).

Identified Historical Archaeological Items located within the existing boundaries of the Prince Henry site are:

A. Rock-Cut Steps B. Retaining Wall C. Canalised Water Courses (Canals) D. Rock Shelf, Rock Cutting and Graffiti E. Canalised Watercourse F. Resident Medical Officers Quarters Site G. North Rock Anchor Site H. Footings/Kerbing I. Rock Cutting 'South Drain' J. Remnant Garden Beds K. Cemetery Road L. Sandstone Platform M. A small number of Movable Items (in addition to those identified in the Conservation management Plan), include cut sandstone blocks, the 1937 Entrance Gates (also identified as a movable item in the CMP) and concrete plinths.

Other items are located within Historical Archaeological Zones as identified in the attached plans including retaining walls, sandstone drains, sandstone kerbing, remnant timber split rail fencing, defence related items and rock-cut features. Although features associated with the two cemeteries including the former Cemetery Road, gravestones, timber post-and-rail fencing and sandstone blockwork are beyond the study area, they are also associated with the Prince Henry site. Historical archaeological evidence, including sandstone drains and road alignments, of the former Working Patients Dormitories, also continues to exist to the south of the Prince Henry site.

=== Modifications and dates ===
The Prince Henry site, Little Bay has undergone numerous and continual modification and change since its inception. Four key phases of development reflect the site's transition from the Coast Hospital, built for the isolation and treatment of infectious diseases, to the Prince Henry Hospital, which later became a major general and teaching hospital.

=== Establishment and Early Consolidation of the Coast Hospital, 1881–1914 ===
This phase represents the first use of the site in 1881, for temporary accommodation as a response to an outbreak of smallpox. One hundred and seventy-five hectares of land at Little Bay were reserved for quarantine purposes, ultimately leading to the establishment of an isolation hospital and sanatorium. The layout and design of the Coast Hospital reflected hospital design practices of the time including separate locations for infectious patients and the sanatorium. Apart from archaeological evidence of the Coast Hospital and the Male Lazaret, only a small number of features survive from this period, including the Dam, the former Coast Hospital Steam Laundry, Pine Cottage, Pine Avenue (historic road alignment, sandstone kerbing, retaining wall and pine trees), the Artisans' Cottages and buildings from the Infectious Diseases Division (Ward 16, the Kitchen and Boiler House) which have been incorporated into the Institute of Tropical Medicine. A number of other historic road alignments remain including, the loop roads to the Infectious Diseases Division and Nurses (14) Quarters (Sewing Cottage) and to the Matron Dickson Nurses Home and the Bush Wards, the road associated with the Artisans' Cottages, the Coast Hospital Road and the Cemetery Road as does the Second (North) Cemetery.

=== Expansion of the Coast Hospital, 1915–34 ===
This phase represents a period of growth that began after the then Board of Health unveiled plans for considerable expansion of the Coast Hospital, which was to include the construction of up to 20 new wards, each of which would contain 50 beds. This area was to be known as the "Flowers Hospital". Although only six of the wards were completed, due to a change of government in 1917, they contributed to the hospital becoming the largest in New South Wales by 1929. Apart from the archaeological evidence of the Working Patient's Dormitories, the original fabric of the former Nurses Dining Hall/Lecture Hall and the Bush Wards, the six Flowers Wards buildings, within an open setting bounded by historic road alignments, are the most significant elements that survive from this period.

=== Prince Henry Hospital (General Hospital), 1935–59 ===
This phase represents the shift of facilities from the former Coast Hospital area to the Flowers Wards area (known as 'The Hill'). It began after November 1934 when it was announced that the Coast Hospital was to be renamed the "Prince Henry Hospital" in honour of Prince Henry, the Duke of Gloucester (who had recently visited Sydney, but not the hospital). Plans were also announced for a large works program to increase the capacity of the hospital to 1,000 beds. Along with the passing of the Prince Henry Hospital Act 1936, which attempted to establish Prince Henry as a postgraduate teaching hospital, the emphasis of this period, apart from increasing capacity was on rectifying the inefficient layout of facilities on the site. Many of the distinctive brick buildings, including Heffron House, the Delaney Building, Matron Dickson Nurses Home and the McIlrath Pathology Building survive from this period.

=== Prince Henry Hospital (General and Major Teaching Hospital), 1960–2001 ===
This phase represents the establishment and consolidation of the role of Prince Henry Hospital as a general and major teaching hospital. It followed legislation passed in 1959 to reform Prince Henry Hospital as a postgraduate hospital associated with the University of New South Wales (UNSW) and the University of Sydney. This formalised Prince Henry Hospital's role as a teaching hospital with closer connections to medical research undertaken by both universities. The immediate effect was that a seventeen-hectare portion of land to the north was transferred to the University of NSW as well as two of the 1917 military wards for animal research. From 1960, extensive renovations throughout Prince Henry Hospital were undertaken to accommodate its new association with the UNSW Medical School. In 1964 major new works were undertaken. Major buildings from this phase such as the Rehabilitation Medicine Centre, The Psychiatric Block, Operating Theatres and the Diagnostic Radiology Building all survive as does the Interdenominational Australian Nurses War Memorial Chapel.

=== 2008: AIA Premier's Prize given to Prince Henry Masterplan: Landcom ===
Occasionally a site presents such complex challenges – politically as well as architecturally – that only the most thoughtful and nuanced solution is acceptable. The old Prince Henry Hospital is such a site – and Landcom's masterplan is such a solution. From the time of its mooted closure, Prince Henry became the subject of intense and justifiable community concern. Thanks to Landcom's unique public benefit mandate, a plan has been developed which delivers innovative solutions to achieving density while maintaining amenity, beauty and social cohesion on a site both large and significant, yet also highly constrained. The masterplan crafts a new residential and community precinct that seamlessly balances old and new, open space and built form, private and public uses, creating a rare showcase of sustainable coastal urban renewal. The cultural and community benefits are immense: 80 per cent of the site retained in public hands; improved access to Little Bay Beach; facilities for seven community groups, as well as a 1500m2 community centre and a new Rescue Helicopter Service facility off site. Heritage issues have also been well addressed, with the site listed on the State Heritage Register, 19 heritage buildings and landscape items conserved, and the historic Flowers Ward restored and adapted as a Nursing Museum to honour the site's long history of healing and care. The masterplan also provides major environmental benefits including: comprehensive site remediation; 9.2 hectares of parks and protected bushland; minimising urban runoff; repairing creek lines and riparian zones, and reusing rainwater for irrigation. Buildings will be required to have 4.5 NatHERS ratings and around 90 per cent of demolition material has been recycled. In short, Prince Henry delivers an impressive social and environmental dividend with few precedents in the field of urban renewal in NSW. It is particularly gratifying that all of this was achieved by a government agency, Landcom, leading a large team of urban designers, architects, planners and landscape architects in delivering a plan that has community benefit and public amenity at its heart. I therefore take this occasion to affirm the enduring relevance of public authorities such as Landcom and the Government Architect's Office in bringing "urban decency" to our cities, towns and suburbs, a role as significant today as when Francis Greenway made his first sketches 200 years ago. In that spirit, I take great pleasure in conferring the 2008 Premier's Award on Landcom for the Prince Henry masterplan, a project of vision and integrity that will bring lasting credit to everyone associated with it.

— Morris Iemma MP, Premier of New South Wales

== Heritage listing ==
As at 14 July 2003, The Prince Henry site was the most important site for the treatment of infectious diseases in New South Wales from its inception in the 1880s, when, as the Coast Hospital, it became the first public hospital in New South Wales in the post-convict era. The Hospital played a prominent role in treating and overcoming infectious diseases and later as a general hospital and teaching hospital for the University of NSW, until its closure was announced in 1988. Its isolation led to the establishment of the first ambulance service in New South Wales from within its grounds.

The location of the hospital by the sea, the design and siting of buildings in a spacious open setting, their relationship with each other and the layout of the site itself, created an aesthetically distinctive complex with Pine Avenue as its central axis. The buildings and landscape provide evidence of the prevailing attitude to health care during a number of important phases of development. The Flowers Wards and the remains of the early infectious disease hospital, including Ward 16, the former Nurses (14) Quarters, the former Nurses Dining Hall/Nurses Lecture Hall, the Bush Wards and the site of the Male Lazaret, demonstrate the isolation required for the treatment of infectious diseases and early attitudes to public health, which saw health benefits in being by the sea. The architectural character of these early buildings contrasts with later buildings built after 1934, after the Hospital changed its name to Prince Henry and a new phase of expansion began. The larger scaled Heffron and Delaney Medical Ward Buildings, the Matron Dickson Nurses Home, and the McIlrath Pathology Building provide evidence of changing practices in medical care and staff accommodation, as well as contributing visually to the ambience of the place. A range of ancillary buildings, such as the former Water Reservoir, the Memorial Clock Tower, Water Tower, and 'Hill Theatres' add visual as well as technological interest.

A coastal landscape of high scenic and scientific value is enhanced by the beach, headlands and pockets of indigenous vegetation. A geological exposure area has research and educational value relating to the development of the present coastline and to the climate and vegetation of the area twenty million years ago. A number of cultural landscape features including the Norfolk Island Pine trees along Pine Avenue, plantings of palms, New Zealand Christmas trees and banksias, rock cuttings, retaining walls, early road alignments and sandstone kerbs, provide evidence of human intervention in this coastal landscape. The North Cemetery, although separated from the present hospital site, is an important component of the cultural landscape.

The history of the Prince Henry site is interwoven with Aboriginal people and wider communities, many of whom were patients or worked on the site and still visit it. The site is valued by Aboriginal people for its historical associations and Aboriginal occupation prior to European occupation, as well as its associations with Aboriginal people treated for infectious diseases. The Prince Henry site is also important to many of the thousands of nurses, doctors and administrators who value their training and achievements at the hospital, which gained them a high reputation throughout New South Wales and Australia. Many former nurses have remained actively associated with the site, and have created a museum to conserve its history and artefacts. They come to the site to enjoy its ambience and continue to use the Interdenominational Australian Nurses War Memorial Chapel, built in memory of service nurses, many of whom died at sea. Much more about the history of the Prince Henry site is yet to be learnt from the rich array of known and potential Aboriginal and historical archaeological sites, from further research and archival recording, and from the oral histories of those who worked or trained there.

=== Statement of significance of the archaeological remains ===
The Prince Henry site contains both identified archaeological features and areas of known archaeological potential. These elements are part of the total physical record of the first post-convict era hospital in New South Wales. The physical evidence at the site documents, and therefore provides opportunities to investigate, evolving medical practice associated with the treatment of infectious disease. In a wider context the site reflects changes and development in state health policy for more than 100 years. The research value of the site's historical archaeological resource is only moderate, however, because of the physical impact of ongoing development. Although the extant archaeological resource is therefore not intact, and there are extensive documentary sources available, the place has potential to yield information about site use and occupation. The spectrum of archaeological features across the site also provides a rare opportunity to use archaeology as an investigative tool on a wide scale. The historical archaeological resource at the Prince Henry site also contributes to the total ensemble providing an indication of former activities or features. They are therefore part of the site's wider social and historic value and have educational and interpretive potential.

Prince Henry Site was listed on the New South Wales State Heritage Register on 2 May 2003 having satisfied the following criteria.

The place is important in demonstrating the course, or pattern, of cultural or natural history in New South Wales.

The Prince Henry site was in almost continual use for over 120 years as an infectious disease and general hospital. The distance of the hospital from Sydney reflected contemporary community fear of virulent disease, such as smallpox, cholera, influenza, leprosy and plague. The Prince Henry site contains physical evidence of major public works associated with State health policy. Prince Henry Hospital played a major role as a teaching hospital from the 1960s and as a centre of excellence for a number of medical procedures and technologies. The site contains geological deposits attesting to physiographic, climatic and botanical conditions at a very early phase of the development of current coastal geography of eastern Australia. Prince Henry Hospital was the first public hospital in the post-convict era. The Prince Henry site was important in the Colonial Government's response to public health concerns, in particular in regard to infectious disease. In 1960, Prince Henry Hospital was proclaimed the first teaching hospital of the newly formed University of NSW (UNSW). Prince Henry Hospital operated as a public hospital from its inception in the 1880s until its progressive closure in the 1990s.

The distance of the hospital from Sydney reflected contemporary community fear of virulent disease, such as smallpox, cholera, influenza, leprosy and plague.

The Prince Henry site contains physical evidence of major public works associated with State health policy.

Prince Henry Hospital played a major role as a teaching hospital from the 1960s and as a centre of excellence for a number of medical procedures and technologies.

Prince Henry Hospital was the first public hospital in the post-convict era. The Prince Henry site was important in the colonial Government's response to public health concerns, in particular in regard to infectious disease.

In 1960, Prince Henry Hospital was proclaimed the first teaching hospital of the new University of NSW (UNSW).

Prince Henry Hospital operated as a public hospital since its inception in the 1880s until its closure in 1988.

The place has a strong or special association with a person, or group of persons, of importance of cultural or natural history of New South Wales's history.

The Prince Henry site is associated with the establishment of the first permanent ambulance service in NSW, operating from within the hospital from the 1880s. The Prince Henry site is associated with a number of prominent medical personnel, including Dr J Ashburton-Thompson, Dr CJM Waters and Dr N Stanley. The Prince Henry site has strong associations with the training of medical and nursing staff, many of whom remained in the hospital at Little Bay following the completion of their training. Some, such as Matron Dickson and Matron McNevin, were remembered through the naming of nurses' accommodation after them. The Prince Henry site was encouraged to develop in the early twentieth century by the then Minister for Health, Mr Fred Flowers. The Prince Henry site has associations with a number of prominent administrators, public officials and benefactors, such as RJ Heffron and JE Delaney, FW Marks and H and C McIlrath, which is reflected in the naming of buildings after them. The Prince Henry site has a minor association with internationally renowned Australian test cricketer Charlie McCartney who is associated with the Prince Henry site, having acted as hospital amenities officer from 1948, establishing a cricket oval and tutoring staff in various sports.

The place is important in demonstrating aesthetic characteristics and/or a high degree of creative or technical achievement in New South Wales.

The Prince Henry site contains a rich assembly of medical, nursing and administrative buildings that reflect changing attitudes to medical care and public health administration over a period of over 120 years. The Prince Henry site, its location and its open spatial setting by the sea demonstrates the isolation required for the early treatment of infectious diseases in New South Wales and the health benefits that the seaside setting was thought to offer. The Prince Henry site is a visually distinctive cultural landscape of buildings, open space and seascape. A number of buildings, including the Flowers Wards, Matron Dickson Nurses Home, Heffron House and the Delaney Building are individually aesthetically distinctive, and contribute to the aesthetic values of the site as a whole. Natural and man-made features, including Pine Avenue, unfolding vistas across the landscape to the headland the sea, the coastal landscape, including Little Bay, contribute to the high visual values and landmark qualities of the Prince Henry site. A number of built elements and landscape features, such as the pine trees along Pine Avenue, the Memorial Clock Tower, the Water Tower, the War Memorial Chapel, the Flowers Wards, the Heffron and Delaney Buildings, rock cuttings, rock outcrops and regenerated bushland are landmark features in their own right and heighten the landmark qualities of the site. The design of early buildings, their configuration and relationship to each other, historic roads and the layout of the site itself creates an aesthetically distinctive complex that provides built evidence of a number of important phases of the site's development as a major public and teaching hospital. The architectural character of the buildings, which are associated with particular types of medical and nursing activities, reflect the changing tastes and technologies towards these practices. This is evident in the contrasts between early wards such as Ward 16, the Flowers Wards and later wards such as the Heffron and Delaney Buildings, the old and new Pathology Department buildings and differences between the various nursing and residential accommodation on the site, from the early timber cottages to the Matron Dickson and Matron McNevin Nurses Homes.

The place has a strong or special association with a particular community or cultural group in New South Wales for social, cultural or spiritual reasons.

The Prince Henry site is important to Aboriginal people as a place with which they have spiritual connections and where physical links to the land can be demonstrated. Aboriginal people from all over New South Wales were patients at the hospital and worked there, many for long periods. The Prince Henry site is of profound importance to former nurses and nursing administrators. Thousands of nurses trained on the site. They gained skills that were highly valued and many had distinguished careers, not only at Prince Henry, but in hospitals throughout Australia and overseas. The Prince Henry site is valued by former medical administrators for its prominence in the treatment of infectious diseases in New South Wales, its role as a teaching hospital, a major hospital and for the work of many prominent medical administrators and specialists in advancing medical procedures and technologies. The Prince Henry site is interwoven with the local community, including the La Perouse Aboriginal community. Local people have strong associations with the place as staff, patients and visitors. The Prince Henry site is important to former nurses and nursing as a place where they return to meet and reflect, visit its chapel and museum, and enjoy its ambience. The Prince Henry site is important to many senior members of the community who support the centre at the site in order to keep the Prince Henry site alive as well as enhancing their lifestyle at the former hospital as it is today. The Prince Henry site is valued by former nurses, staff and the community as a place where many historic themes and phases in the development of the hospital can be appreciated. The Prince Henry site is valued by community and cultural groups that feel regret about the loss of the hospital and are concerned that its spatial qualities and ambience should not be lost for themselves or future generations. it is a place that is held in high esteem by a number of identifiable groups for its cultural values; if Prince Henry was damaged or destroyed, it would cause the community and cultural groups a sense of loss; and it contributes to the sense of identity of the community and a number of cultural groups.

The place has potential to yield information that will contribute to an understanding of the cultural or natural history of New South Wales.

The geological gully-fill deposits and their relationships, especially within the Critical Exposure Area, have the potential to provide further detailed knowledge of near-coastal climate and vegetation of the middle Miocene Period. The unique exposures need to be conserved for further study, in order to test and refine developing geological concepts concerning continental and indeed global earth processes of the period. The site, through further analysis of documentary and physical evidence, including oral sources and archaeological investigation, has high potential to yield further substantial information about Aboriginal occupation from the prehistoric period to the present day. The site has potential to contribute to research into the development of an important sector of the health community during the nineteenth century, particularly medical practices associated with the isolation and treatment of infectious diseases. The site's association with Aboriginal prehistory, the interaction of Aboriginal people with public health practices, its role in the treatment of infectious disease and as a major teaching and public hospital establishes it as a benchmark or reference type that distinguishes it from hospitals elsewhere.

The place possesses uncommon, rare or endangered aspects of the cultural or natural history of New South Wales.

Prince Henry Hospital's role in the treatment of infectious diseases is unparalleled in New South Wales. While a detailed comparative study has not been undertaken, it is known from available information that no other hospital in NSW was set up solely for the purpose of treating infectious diseases. Where such treatment occurred at other hospitals or institutions, including the Quarantine Station, the facilities were not as extensive or comprehensive as at the Prince Henry site. It provides rare evidence of medical and nursing practices that are now defunct, and its isolation led to the formation of the NSW Ambulance service operating from within its grounds. The geological gully-fill deposits of the Miocene period are unique, especially the peaty shale deposits of estuarine origin. Even more significant is the assemblage of fossil pollens and other microflora in the shale. The clear evidence of lateritic mantling is also unique on the eastern Australian coastline. The Prince Henry site provides evidence of Aboriginal prehistory, the treatment of infectious diseases among Aboriginals and in the community generally that is rare in New South Wales and important to community groups. It would require further research and analysis to detail the extent to which the Prince Henry site demonstrates other aspects of the rarity criteria. However, the assessment undertaken to date is clearly sufficient to establish the Prince Henry site as having rarity value at State and Local levels.

The place is important in demonstrating the principal characteristics of a class of cultural or natural places/environments in New South Wales.

The Prince Henry site, through the nature and degree of its historic, aesthetic, social, significance, technical/research potential and rarity, provides ample evidence to represent the following key State themes: science; government and administration; health; education; death; and persons. It satisfies all of the following inclusion guidelines, at State and Local levels: is a fine example of its type; has the potential characteristics of an important class or group of items; has attributes typical of a particular way of life, philosophy, custom, significant process, design, technique or activity; is a significant variation to a class of items; is part of a group, which collectively illustrates a representative type; is outstanding because of its setting, condition or size; and is outstanding because of its integrity of the esteem in which it is held. Some of the geological elements have some importance under this criterion, namely the shale, the gully-fill sand and the lateritic soil horizon. In each case the element is a significant variation to a class of items rather than being typical of the relevant class.

== See also ==
- Prince of Wales Hospital (Sydney)
