= Albert Cotter Bridge =

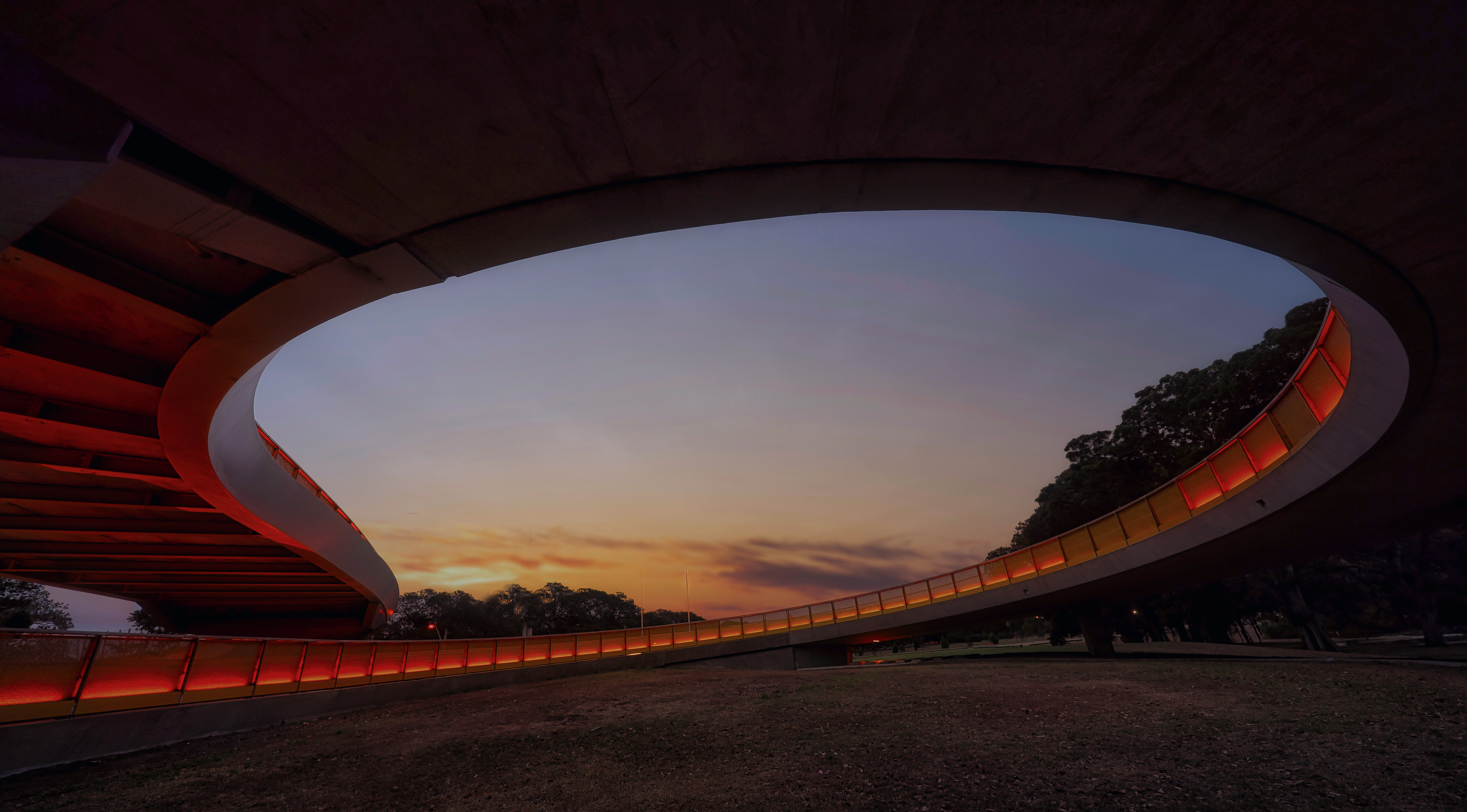
- Coordinates: 33°53′24″S 151°13′14″E
- Carries: Pedestrian and bicycle traffic
- Crosses: Anzac Parade
- Locale: Moore Park, New South Wales, Australia
- Official name: Albert 'Tibby' Cotter Walkway
- Named for: Tibby Cotter
- Maintained by: Transport for NSW

Characteristics
- Design: Helical approach ramps and a superstructure formed using two slender curved steel box beams
- Material: Concrete
- Total length: 440 metres (1,440 ft)
- Width: 6 metres (20 ft)

History
- Architect: Arup
- Constructed by: Lendlease
- Construction cost: A$38 million
- Opened: 27 February 2015

Location
- Interactive map of Albert Cotter Bridge

The Albert Cotter Bridge, also known as the Tibby Cotter Bridge, is a pedestrian bridge across Anzac Parade, Sydney, New South Wales, Australia. It was built primarily to cater for crowds exiting the Sydney Cricket Ground and Sydney Football Stadium.

== History ==
Construction on the Albert Cotter Bridge commenced in 2014. It was opened in time for the 2015 Cricket World Cup. It was named after Albert "Tibby" Cotter, an Australian Test cricket player killed in World War I. It is a shared pedestrian and cycle pathway. The 440-metre-long (1,440 ft) bridge features concrete helical approach ramps and a superstructure formed using two curved steel box beams.

The bridge's construction was criticised by the Auditor-General of New South Wales finding that the tight construction timeline significantly added A$25 million to its cost. Additional criticism was raised by the Heritage Council of New South Wales due to the relocation of a monument on Anzac Parade and cycling lobby groups as the walkway does not connect with existing cycleways.

== Criticism ==
Since its opening, the design of the Albert Cotter Bridge has been heavily criticised by pedestrians. It has been described as a "white elephant" for its inappropriate positioning. Because the helical approach forces pedestrians to walk 440 metres to travel about 200 metres, it has also been called "the worst", and "a dumb bridge because it goes around in a big circle".
