= Little Bay, New South Wales =

Little Bay
- Suburb
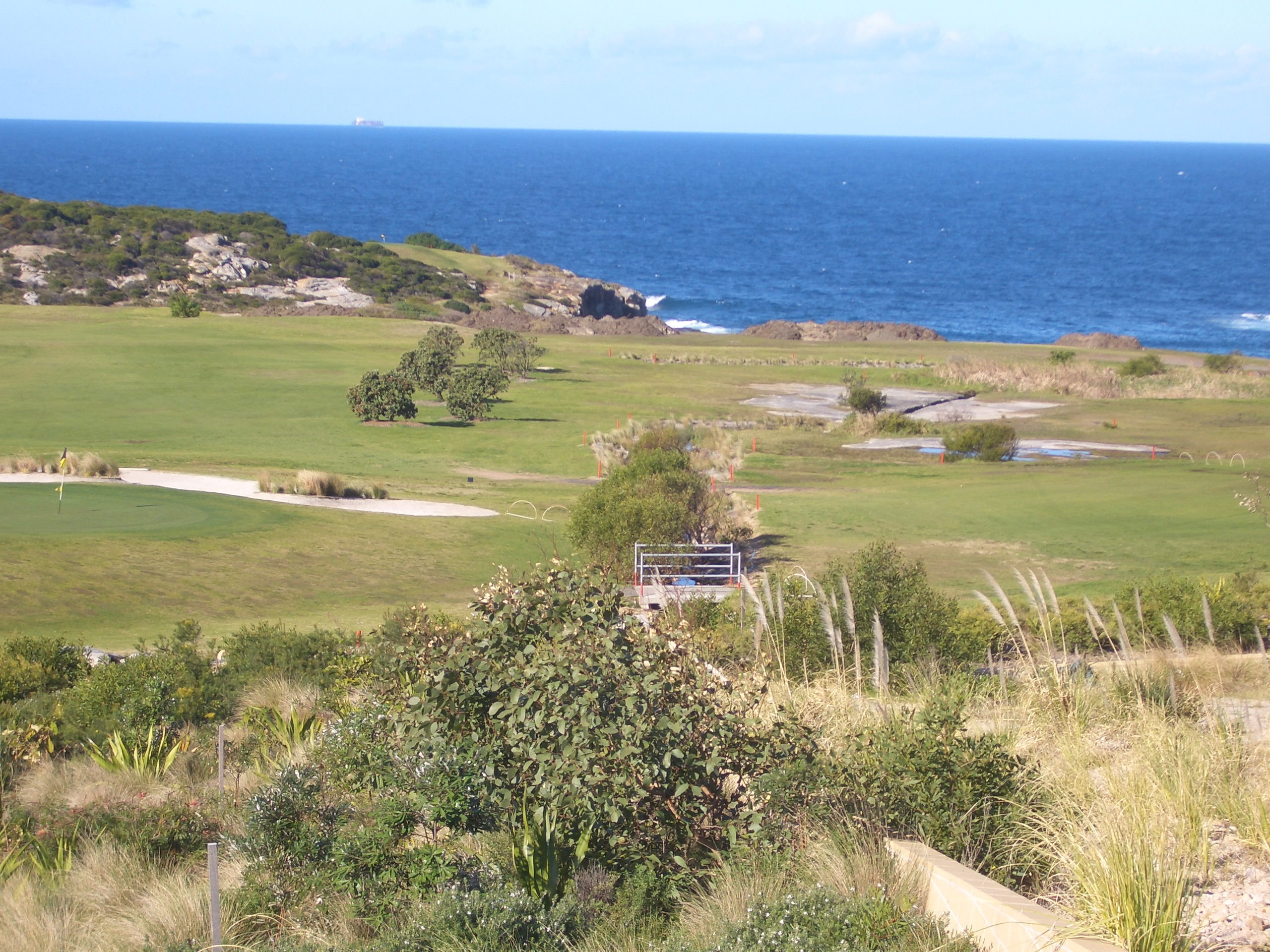
- The Coast Golf Course

- Interactive map of Little Bay
- Country: Australia
- State: New South Wales
- City: Sydney
- LGA: City of Randwick
- Location: 14 km (8.7 mi) south-east of Sydney CBD

Government
  - State electorate: Maroubra
  - Federal division: Kingsford Smith
- Elevation: 39 m (128 ft)

Population
  - Total: 4,817 (2021 census)
- Postcode: 2036
Suburbs around Little Bay
Matraville	Chifley	Malabar
Phillip Bay	Little Bay	Tasman Sea
La Perouse	La Perouse

Little Bay is a suburb in the Eastern Suburbs of Sydney, New South Wales, Australia. It is located 14 kilometres south-east of the Sydney central business district and is part of the local government area of the City of Randwick.

Little Bay is a coastal suburb, to the north of Botany Bay. The suburb takes its name from the geographical formation called Little Bay, which also features a small beach. The Prince Henry Hospital was a famous landmark once located at Little Bay.

== History ==
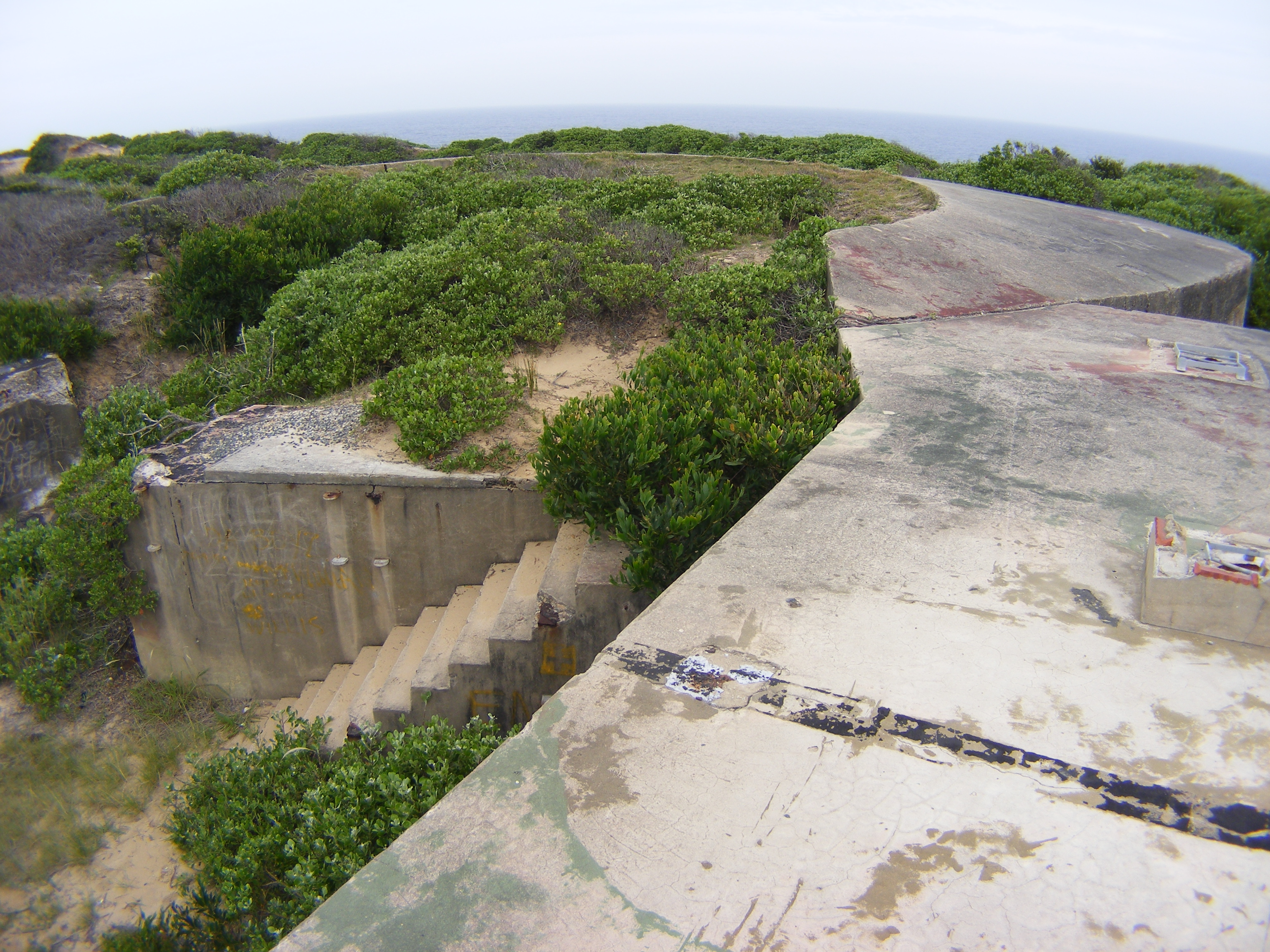
Partially buried gun emplacement that formed part of Fort Banks

The Little Bay area was first used as a sanitation camp during Sydney's smallpox outbreak in 1881–82, to isolate the healthy contacts of sufferers of the disease. At first, a tent city was established on the beach, but as well the government decided to build a permanent hospital here to treat infectious diseases. Little Bay was an ideal location because it was isolated from settlements but still close enough to Sydney. The Coast Hospital was particularly valuable during the bubonic plague in Sydney of 1900 and then again when soldiers returning from Europe brought the influenza virus back in 1919. The Coast Hospital became Prince Henry Hospital in 1934. In 2001 services were transferred to Prince of Wales Hospital and the hospital site became available for residential use.

There are still nineteen heritage listed buildings on site from the Coast/Prince Henry days.

Two landmarks still remain from the hospital days. One is the Coast Cemetery, situated south of Little Bay. Some two thousand five hundred plus people were buried there, with the oldest graves being located further south, towards Cape Banks. The cemetery was taken over by the National Parks and Wildlife Service of New South Wales when the Botany Bay National Park was created. Most of the graves are now under vegetation to protect them.

Another landmark is the Interdenominational War Memorial Chapel, which overlooks Little Bay. It was destroyed by fire in October 1981, but was subsequently rebuilt in 1982. Outside the chapel there is an array of memorial plaques dedicated to former staff of the hospital.

Little Bay was originally called Yarra Junction but mail would end up in Melbourne so the residents asked for the suburb's name to be changed. This was granted and changed to Phillip Bay Heights (Phillip Bay is a suburb located between Little Bay and Botany Bay) but as everyone called the area Little Bay this was the name that was eventually officially adopted. During the 1950s, much of the land was provided to returned servicemen via War Ballots.

In 1969, the international artists Christo and Jeanne-Claude created the world's largest sculpture at Little Bay called: "Wrapped Coast – One Million Square Feet, Little Bay, Sydney, Australia". Many Australian artists and students volunteered to assist them wrapping 2.4 kilometres of coastline, which was 46 to 244 metres wide, up to 26 metres high at the northern cliffs, and at sea level at the southern sandy beach. It introduced a radical work of art which at the time was controversial and polarised the community. It marked the beginning of a new chapter of contemporary art in Australia and today is considered a triumphant project. Christo and Jeanne-Claude went on to wrap cars, galleries, islands, and even the Reichstag building in Germany.

== Heritage listings ==
Little Bay has a number of heritage-listed sites, including:

- 1430 Anzac Parade: Prince Henry Site

== Little Bay Beach ==
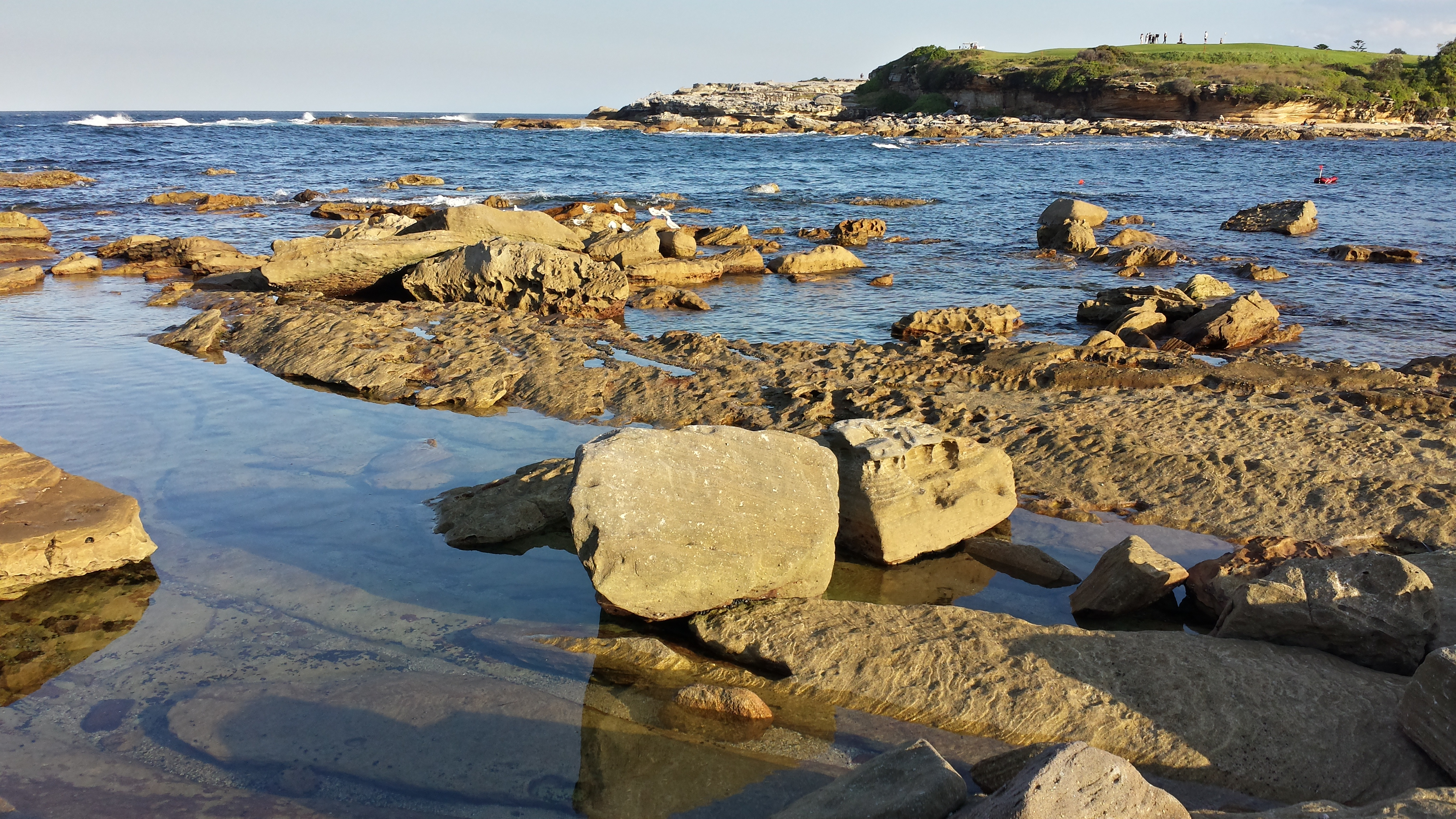
Little Bay Beach at sunset

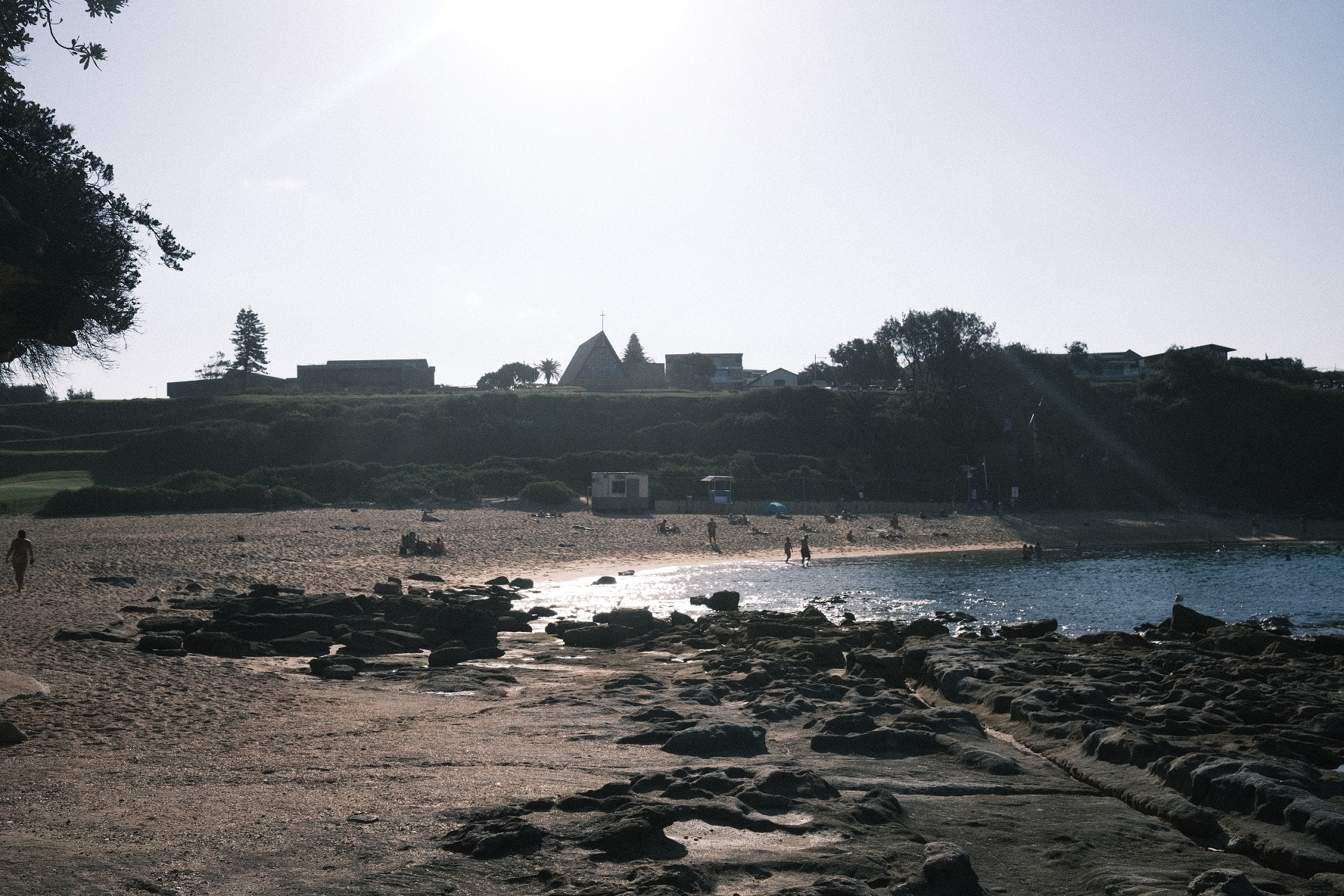
Little Bay Beach in the evening

In the stretch of coastline south of Sydney Harbour, Little Bay Beach is the last significant sand beach before Botany Bay. Little Bay took its name from the obvious comparison to nearby Long Bay at Malabar. On the evening of 3 December 1797, George Bass, at the commencement of his first major voyage of discovery in the waters of southern Australia, anchored there in his open whaleboat with a crew of six, referring to it in his journal as Little Harbour.

Little Bay beach is semi-circular in shape and enclosed by headlands to the south and north. Its narrow entrance provides significant shelter from prevailing sea conditions.

A ring-of-rocks bathing pool known as Little Bay Rock Pool or Little Bay Baths was created from beach rocks at the southern end of the beach in the early 1900s to provide safe shark-free bathing for nurses resident nearby at the Coast Hospital. The pool is still partially intact.

Little Bay is not a surf beach and does not have an undertow or "rip" unless there is a strong sea from the south or south-east running into the bay. The beach is not patrolled by lifesavers. However surf lifesavers and the Westpac Life Saver Rescue Helicopter Service attend to incidents. Rock fishing is very popular along the rocky coastline to the north and south of Little Bay, but it is also very dangerous with deaths occurring occasionally. Information on water safety at Little Bay is provided on the Little Bay Beach web site.

In February 2022, a 35-year-old expatriate British diving instructor was killed by a white shark while swimming off Little Bay Beach. He was the first person killed by a shark in Sydney coastal waters since the death of Marcia Hathaway in 1963.

As the population of Sydney grew, the beaches south of the Malabar Wastewater Treatment Plant including Little Bay, became increasingly polluted. By the 1980s, the water was brown and fat was deposited on the sand and rocks, making them slimy and smelly. After the Malabar Deep Ocean Outfall commenced operation in 1990, the beaches to the south became significantly cleaner within a very short period of time. Today, Little Bay is consistently one of the cleanest beaches in Sydney, in terms of water clarity and bacteria counts.

== Landmarks ==
The north headland of Botany Bay (Henry Head) has a number of features, including two old gun emplacements at Fort Banks, and an unattended lighthouse and the wreck of the SS Minmi on what is called Pussycat Island. The older of the gun emplacements, known as the Henry Head Battery was originally built just after the completion of Bare Island to provide additional coverage of the entrance to Botany Bay.

- Former Prince Henry Hospital
- Spinal Cord Injuries Australia
- Aboriginal Health College
- Prince Henry Development Project
- Little Bay Weather Station

== Notable residents ==
- Russell Fairfax, rugby league player
- Greg Inglis, rugby league player
- Anthony Maroon, radio personality
- Tony Rafty, cartoonist
- Jane Saville, race walker
- Fiona Stanley, paediatrician and 2003 Australian of the Year
- David Warner, Test cricketer
- Nathan Williamson, broadcaster/journalist

== Street names ==
Many street names in Little Bay were derived from Aboriginal words or eminent people, especially those associated with medicine through the presence of the former Prince Henry Hospital.

Name	Derivation
Abbe Receveur Place	Named after Louis Receveur, a Franciscan friar and scientist who sailed with La Perouse
Alkoo Avenue	Aboriginal word meaning "visitor"
Anzac Parade	Named to commemorate the occasion when the First Australian Imperial Force camped at Kensington Racecourse
Bega Avenue	Aboriginal word meaning "large camping ground"
Binda Crescent	Aboriginal word meaning "deep water"
Brodie Avenue	Named after surgeon Benjamin Collins Brodie
Budd Avenue	Named after an early female resident
Bunnerong Road	Aboriginal word meaning "sleeping lizard"
Clonard Way	
Coast Hospital Road	Named after The Coast Hospital, the original name for Prince Henry Hospital
Cove Circuit	
Curie Street	Named after Pierre and Marie Curie
Darwin Avenue	Named after naturalist Charles Darwin
Dawes Avenue	Named after Lieutenant William Dawes who was on the First Fleet
Dwyer Avenue	Named after Matt Dwyer, former mayor of Randwick
Esperance Close	
Ewing Avenue	Named after pathologist James Ewing
Fleming Street	Named after bacteriologist Alexander Fleming
Florey Crescent	Named after pharmacologist and pathologist Howard Florey
Gipps Avenue	Named after George Gipps, former governor of NSW
Goora Street	Aboriginal word meaning "long" or "tall"
Grose Street	Named after Francis Grose, first Lieutenant-Governor of NSW
Gubbuteh Road	Aboriginal word meaning "ochre", named after local ochre deposits
Gull Street	Named after physician William Gull
Harvey Street	Named after physician William Harvey
Jenner Street	Named after surgeon Edward Jenner
Jennifer Street	
Lister Avenue	Named after surgeon Joseph Lister
Little Bay Road	Named after nearby Little Bay
Marconi Place	Named after Guglielmo Marconi, Italian physicist who developed the wireless telegraph
Mayo Street	Named after physician William Worrall Mayo
McMaster Place	Named after Jean McMaster who established the Nurses' Training School at Prince Henry Hospital
Meyler Close	Named after Mary Meyler, first matron of Prince Henry Hospital
Millard Drive	Named after Dr Reginald Millard, medical superintendent at The Coast Hospital
Mirrabooka Crescent	Aboriginal word for the "Southern Cross"
Murra Murra Place	Aboriginal word meaning "sea mullet"
Newton Street	Named after Isaac Newton
Noora Avenue	Aboriginal word meaning "camp"
Nurla Avenue	Aboriginal word meaning "plenty"
Pavilion Drive	Named after the pavilion wards at Prince Henry Hospital that allowed fresh air to circulate around infectious patients
Pine Avenue	Named because Norfolk Island pine trees were predominant in the grounds of Prince Henry Hospital
Reservoir Street	Named because there is a water reservoir nearby
Woomera Road	Aboriginal word – see woomera
Woonah Street	

Sources:

- "Historic street & place names". Randwick City Council. 20 August 2014. Archived from the original on 28 May 2020.
- Graham, Susan. "Naming our streets and parks". princehenrycommunity.com.au. Archived from the original on 11 March 2019.

== Transport ==
Little Bay is served by five bus services operated by Transdev John Holland:

Route number	From	To	Service	Source
390X	La Perouse	Bondi Junction railway station	Express	
392	Little Bay	Redfern railway station	Regular	
392X	Little Bay	Museum railway station	Express	
394X	La Perouse	Museum railway station	Express	
399	Little Bay	University of New South Wales	Regular	

== Sport and recreation ==
- St Michael's Golf Club
- The Coast Golf Club
- Surf Life Saving Sydney, Branch Office at 16 Murra Murra Place, Little Bay. Surf Life Saving Sydney
