= Malabar Wastewater Treatment Plant =

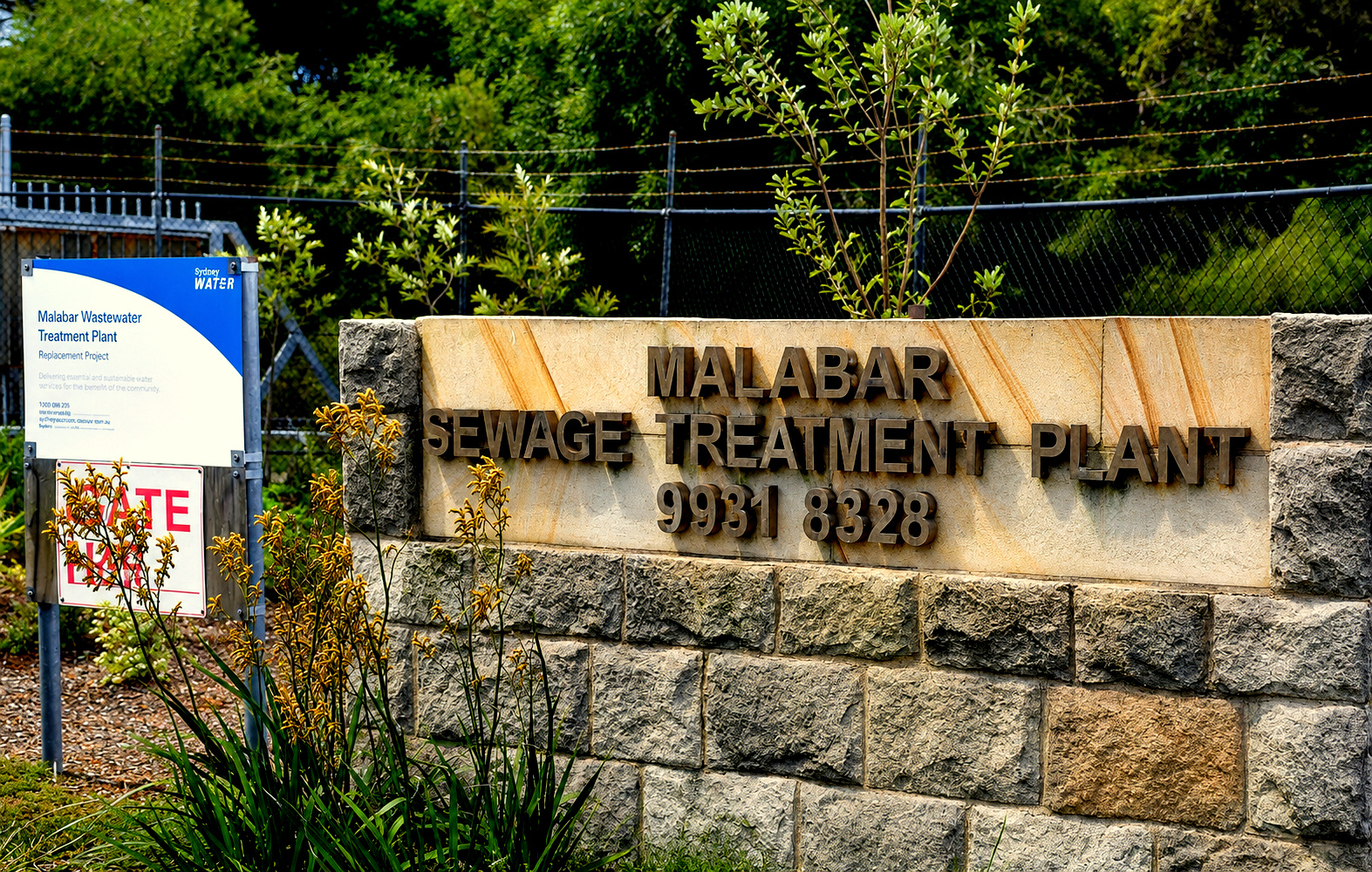
- Entrance sign at the Malabar Wastewater Treatment Plant
- Alternative names: Malabar Water Resource Recovery Facility, Malabar WRRF

General information
- Type: Wastewater treatment plant
- Location: Malabar, New South Wales, Sydney, Australia
- Coordinates: 33°57′45″S 151°15′15″E
- Construction started: 1959
- Opened: February 1975
- Owner: Sydney Water

The Malabar Wastewater Treatment Plant, officially known as the Malabar Water Resource Recovery Facility, is a sewage treatment facility in Malabar, New South Wales, a suburb of Sydney, Australia. Operated by Sydney Water, it is the company's largest wastewater treatment facility and provides primary treatment for between 500 and 1,200 ML (110,000,000 and 260,000,000 imp gal; 130,000,000 and 320,000,000 US gal) of wastewater per day.

The plant receives wastewater from a large portion of southern and western Sydney, with flows originating from areas as far west as Liverpool. The wider Malabar wastewater system serves more than one-third of Sydney's population and is one of the city's oldest and largest wastewater systems.

== History ==
The origins of the Malabar wastewater system are associated with the Southern and Western Suburbs Ocean Outfall Sewer, which was developed to carry sewage from Sydney's southern and western suburbs to the coast. The sewer originally discharged to a sewage farm near Botany Bay, but the farm was abandoned following the extension of the system to an ocean outfall at Malabar in 1916. In 1959, construction commenced on the sewage treatment plant to treat wastewater carried by the Southern and Western Suburbs Ocean Outfall Sewer system. Following a review and redesign of the works during the 1960s, the plant was completed in 1974 at a cost of more than $50 million, with most of its treatment facilities constructed below ground to minimise their visual impact. The first stage was commissioned in February 1975, introducing primary treatment before effluent was discharged into the Pacific Ocean.

During the 1970s, plans were developed to replace Sydney's cliff-face ocean outfalls at North Head, Bondi and Malabar, which together discharged approximately 940 ML (210,000,000 imp gal; 250,000,000 US gal) of wastewater per day, with deepwater ocean outfalls. The new outfalls were intended to improve the protection of beaches and marine waters by reducing visible oil, grease and other floating material while maintaining diverse marine ecosystems. The three deepwater outfalls were commissioned in the early 1990s and initially monitored under a five-year Environmental Monitoring Program. Early assessments found that the outfalls had alleviated most environmental problems associated with the former shoreline discharges without causing major new short-term impacts, although concerns remained over the potential long-term accumulation of sewage-derived particles and contaminants in offshore sediments.

These concerns contributed to monitoring requirements under the New South Wales Environment Protection Authority licences for the three outfalls. At Malabar, Environment Protection Licence 372 requires monitoring of wastewater discharge volumes and contaminant concentrations, oceanographic modelling of plume movement and contaminant settling, and periodic assessment of offshore sediments and infaunal communities for long-term ecological changes. Historically, treated effluent was released through a cliff-face ocean outfall. Between 1984 and 1990, deepwater ocean outfalls were constructed at Malabar, Bondi and North Head, replacing the earlier coastal discharge system. From 1991, treated wastewater from Malabar was discharged through a deepwater ocean outfall extending about 4 kilometres (2.5 miles) offshore.

During the COVID-19 pandemic, raw sewage from the Malabar system was sampled as part of New South Wales' wastewater surveillance program for SARS-CoV-2. In 2020, the Malabar catchment received sewage from approximately 1.85 million people, making it one of the largest catchments monitored. Researchers also proposed sampling upstream pumping stations before wastewater reached large facilities such as Malabar to more precisely identify areas where the virus was circulating.

== Operations ==
The Malabar facility uses primary treatment, including screening and sedimentation to remove large solids and grit from wastewater. Following treatment, wastewater is discharged to the ocean through the Malabar deepwater ocean outfall. The facility also recovers biosolids and biogas during the treatment process. Approximately 26,000 wet tonnes of biosolids are recovered annually. Biogas generated at the plant is used to operate three cogeneration engines, producing heat and electricity for use within the facility. The Fairfield, Glenfield and Liverpool facilities form part of the wider Malabar wastewater system.

The commissioning of the deepwater ocean outfall did not end the discharge of treated wastewater from Malabar into the Pacific Ocean. The plant continues to discharge primary-treated effluent, although the normal discharge point was moved from the former cliff-face outfall to the deepwater outfall several kilometres offshore. Similar deepwater outfalls at Bondi and North Head also remain in operation. The former cliff-face outfall infrastructure remains in place but is no longer used for routine daily discharge. Parts of the older system may retain bypass or emergency functions. Taking the Malabar deepwater outfall offline for major maintenance could require wastewater to be diverted through the cliff-face outfall; such a scenario has been described as highly disruptive and potentially requiring the closure of nearby beaches for several months.

=== Upgrades ===
Sydney Water has commenced a major investment program to upgrade the wider Malabar wastewater system. The program is intended to increase treatment capacity, improve network reliability, reduce wastewater overflows and improve the quality of treated water released into the environment. Following the debris ball incidents, a $3 billion, ten-year investment program was announced for the Malabar wastewater system. The program includes upgrades to inland water resource recovery facilities and is intended to reduce the volume of wastewater requiring treatment at Malabar.

In 2020, the Australian Renewable Energy Agency announced support for a project to upgrade biogas produced at Malabar into biomethane. The project, developed by Sydney Water and Jemena, was designed to inject renewable gas produced from wastewater into the New South Wales gas distribution network and was described as the first project of its kind in Australia. Modelling for the period from 1 December 2024 to 28 February 2025 indicated that negatively buoyant particles discharged from the North Head, Bondi and Malabar deepwater ocean outfalls settled on the seafloor to the north of their respective outfalls.

== Beach debris incidents ==
Between October 2024 and February 2025, debris balls washed ashore on beaches in Sydney and elsewhere along the New South Wales coast. The New South Wales Environment Protection Authority investigated the incidents and found that the material contained a mixture of hair, fatty acids associated with waste cooking oils, faecal material and hydrocarbons. In October 2025, the EPA identified Sydney Water's Malabar wastewater system as the likely source of the debris balls. The finding followed evidence collected under a preliminary investigation notice, which narrowed the origin of the material to within the Malabar system. The EPA subsequently also linked debris balls found on Central Coast beaches in August 2025 to the Malabar system. Investigations identified a large accumulation of fats, oils and grease in a difficult-to-access section of the deepwater ocean outfall system. Changes in flow and pumping conditions were believed to have dislodged material from the accumulation, allowing debris to be discharged offshore and subsequently wash onto beaches.

Following the identification of the Malabar deepwater ocean outfall as the source of debris balls that washed ashore on coastal beaches, additional benthic infauna sampling was recommended for 2026. The monitoring was intended to assess whether wastewater discharged through the outfall had caused significant ecological impacts on seabed communities, particularly after a further debris ball event in August 2025 occurred following the previous sampling in February. No clear accumulation of metals or nutrients was detected in sediments near the Malabar outfall. However, the proportion of fine sediments increased between 2 and 4 kilometres (1.2 and 2.5 mi) from the outfall compared with other locations. Higher proportions of fine sediments were associated with increased concentrations of metals and nutrients.

== See also ==
- Sydney Water
- Sewage treatment
