= Chifley, New South Wales =

Chifley
- Suburb
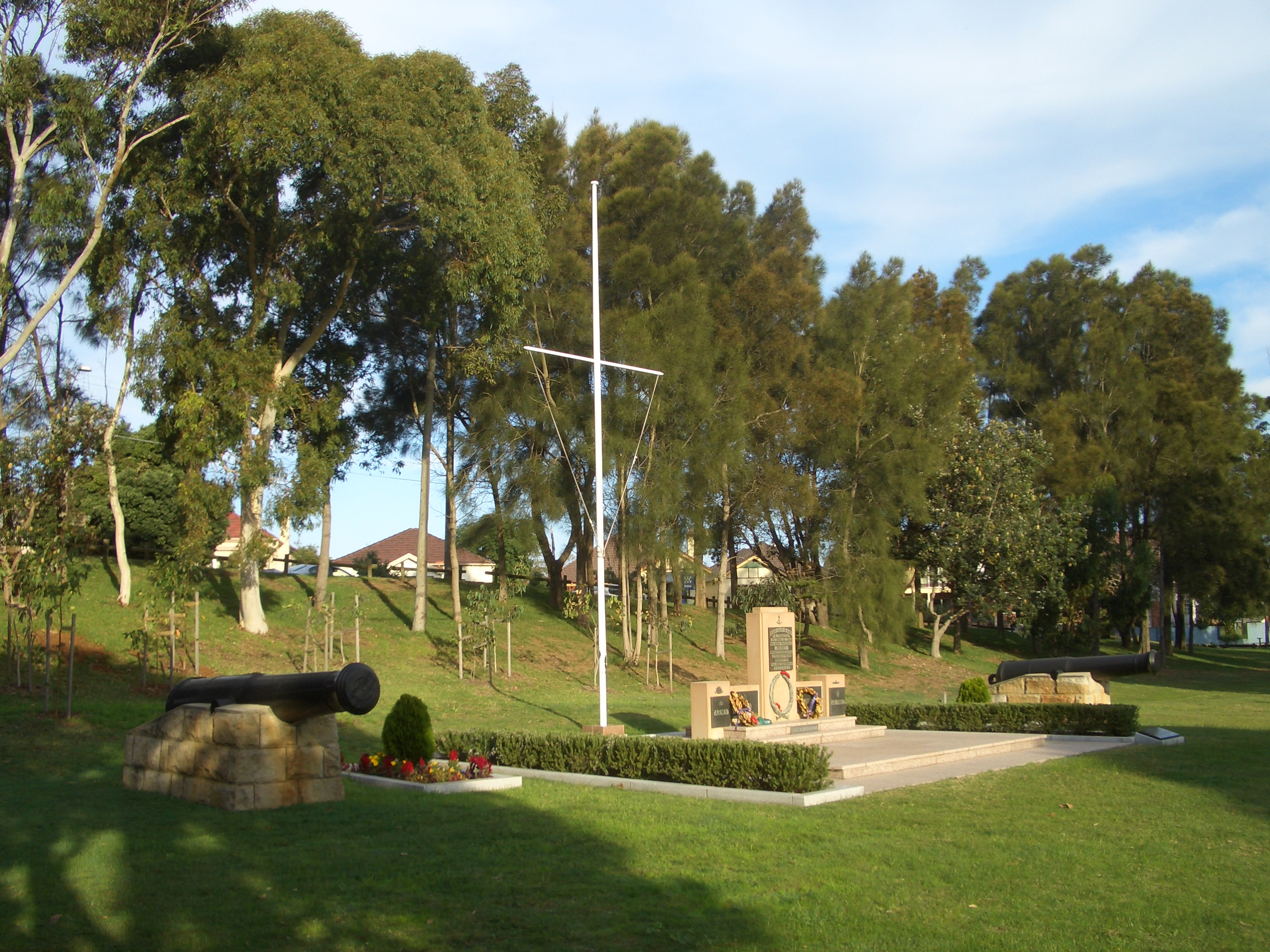
- Bob Clarke Memorial Reserve, Anzac Parade

- Interactive map of Chifley
- Country: Australia
- State: New South Wales
- City: Sydney
- LGA: City of Randwick
- Location: 13 km (8.1 mi) south-east of Sydney CBD

Government
  - State electorate: Maroubra
  - Federal division: Kingsford Smith
- Elevation: 24 m (79 ft)

Population
  - Total: 3,490 (2021 census)
- Postcode: 2036
Suburbs around Chifley
Matraville	Matraville	Malabar
Matraville	Chifley	Malabar
Phillip Bay	Little Bay	Little Bay

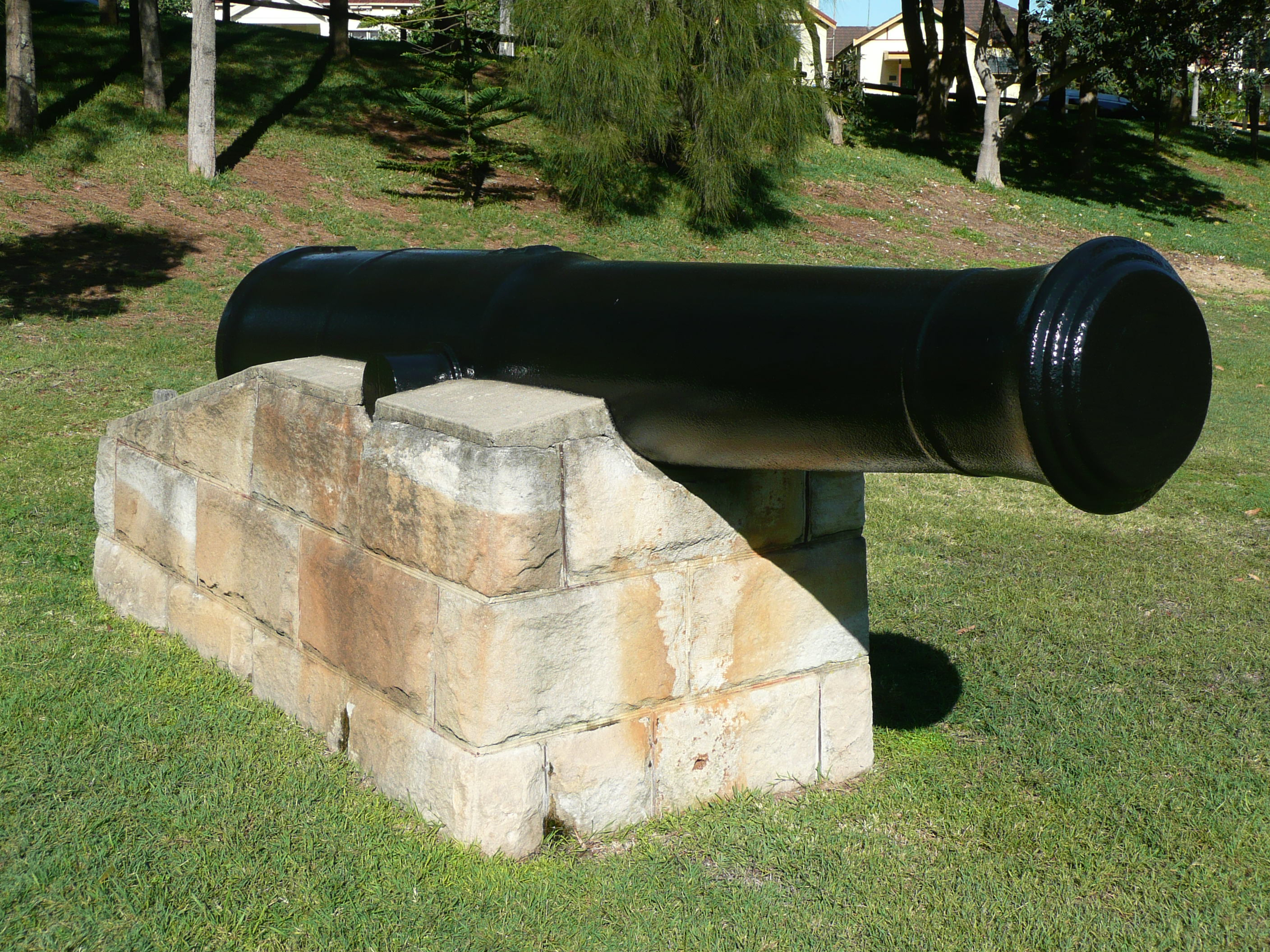
Cannon at Bob Clarke Memorial Reserve

Chifley is a suburb in the Eastern Suburbs of Sydney, in the state of New South Wales, Australia. Chifley is 13 km south-east of the Sydney central business district and is part of the City of Randwick. The postcode is 2036. Chifley is surrounded by the suburbs of Matraville, Malabar, Little Bay and Phillip Bay.

== History ==
Chifley was named after Ben Chifley (1885–1951), Australia's Labor Prime Minister at the end of World War II. Randwick Council made the area, which had been part of southern Matraville, a separate suburb in 1964.

The first house built in the Chifley area was Bunnerong House, which was built in 1825. Most of the land in the area was owned by the Crown, and during the Depression of the 1930s, it was leased to individuals who slowly constructed homes over a prolonged period.

In the 1960s, a large public housing complex was developed in the area, consisting of several four- and five- storey buildings along with smaller structures that offered bedsit style accommodation, where the lounge and bedroom were combined into a single room.

== Chifley today ==
Chifley today is predominantly residential. Its low to medium-density housing has attracted a larger proportion of families with children than many other suburbs in the City of Randwick. In recent years, much of the original housing stock has been demolished and replaced by larger and taller family homes. There are also a number of townhouses which fill up the streets of Chifley.

The suburb contains two schools, Chifley Public School and Matraville Sports High School, and a number of preschool centres. Recreational areas include the Women's Athletic Field and Dr Walters Park.

The western edge of Chifley contains a small remnant of Eastern Suburbs Banksia Scrub, which was once the major flora habitat in this coastal region of Sydney. Efforts are being made to remediate and preserve this area.

A number of notable local points of interest adjoin Chifley, including the Long Bay Correctional Centre, Eastern Suburbs Memorial Park and the Bunnerong Equestrian Park.

== Demographics ==
According to the 2021 census of Population, there were 3,490 people in Chifley.

- Aboriginal and Torres Strait Islander people made up 4.0% of the population.
- The most common ancestries were Australian 27.0%, English 26.8%, Irish 12.9%, Chinese 7.0% and Scottish 6.8%.
- 66.8% of people were born in Australia and 71.4% of people only spoke English at home.
- The most common responses for religion were Catholic 36.9%, No Religion 25.0% and Anglican 12.2%.

== Schools ==
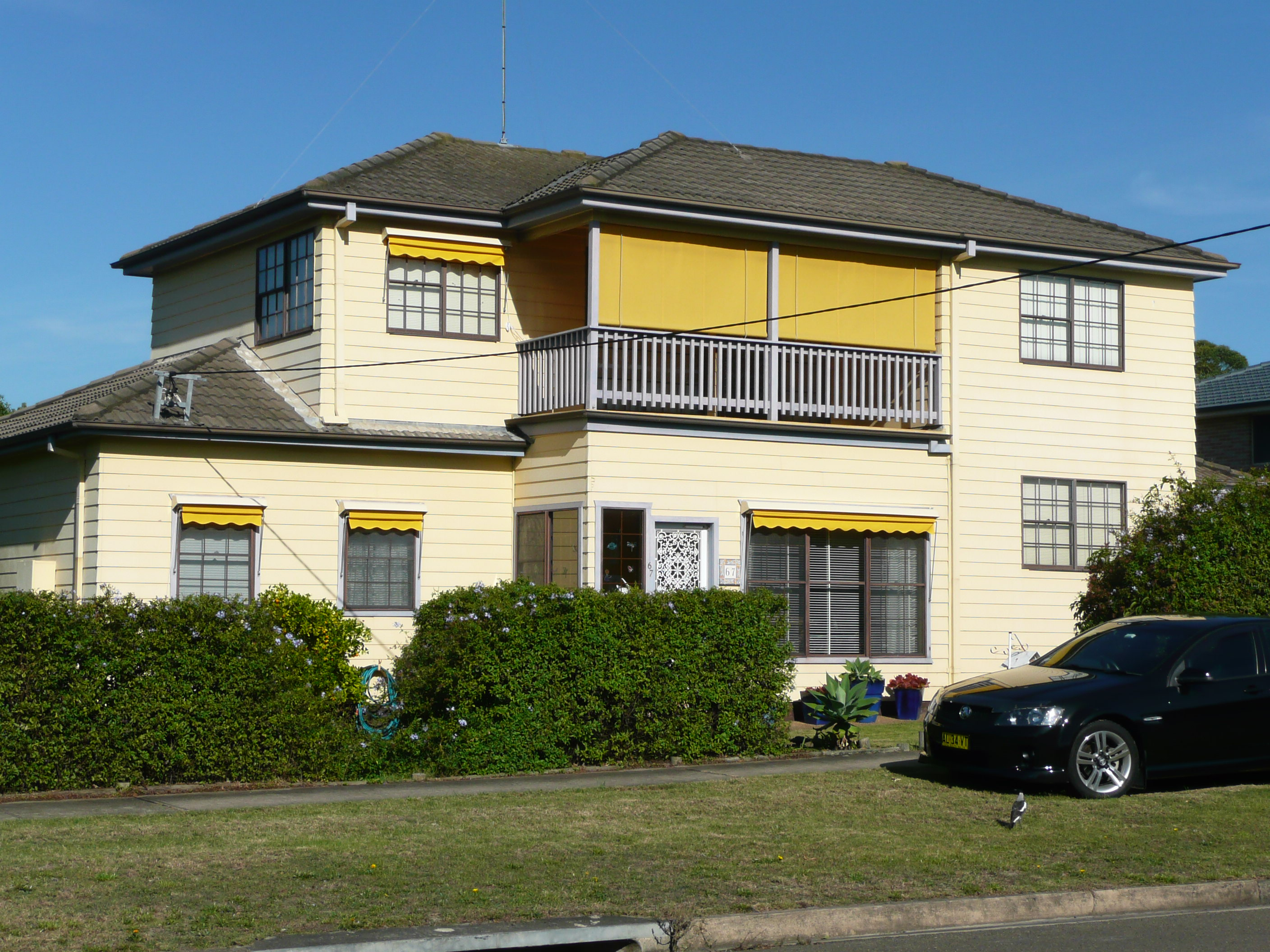
Weatherboard home, Macquarie Street

- Chifley Public School
- Matraville Sports High School

== Parks ==
- Dr Walters Park on Mawson Parade
- Women's Athletic Field
