= Eastlakes =

- Suburb
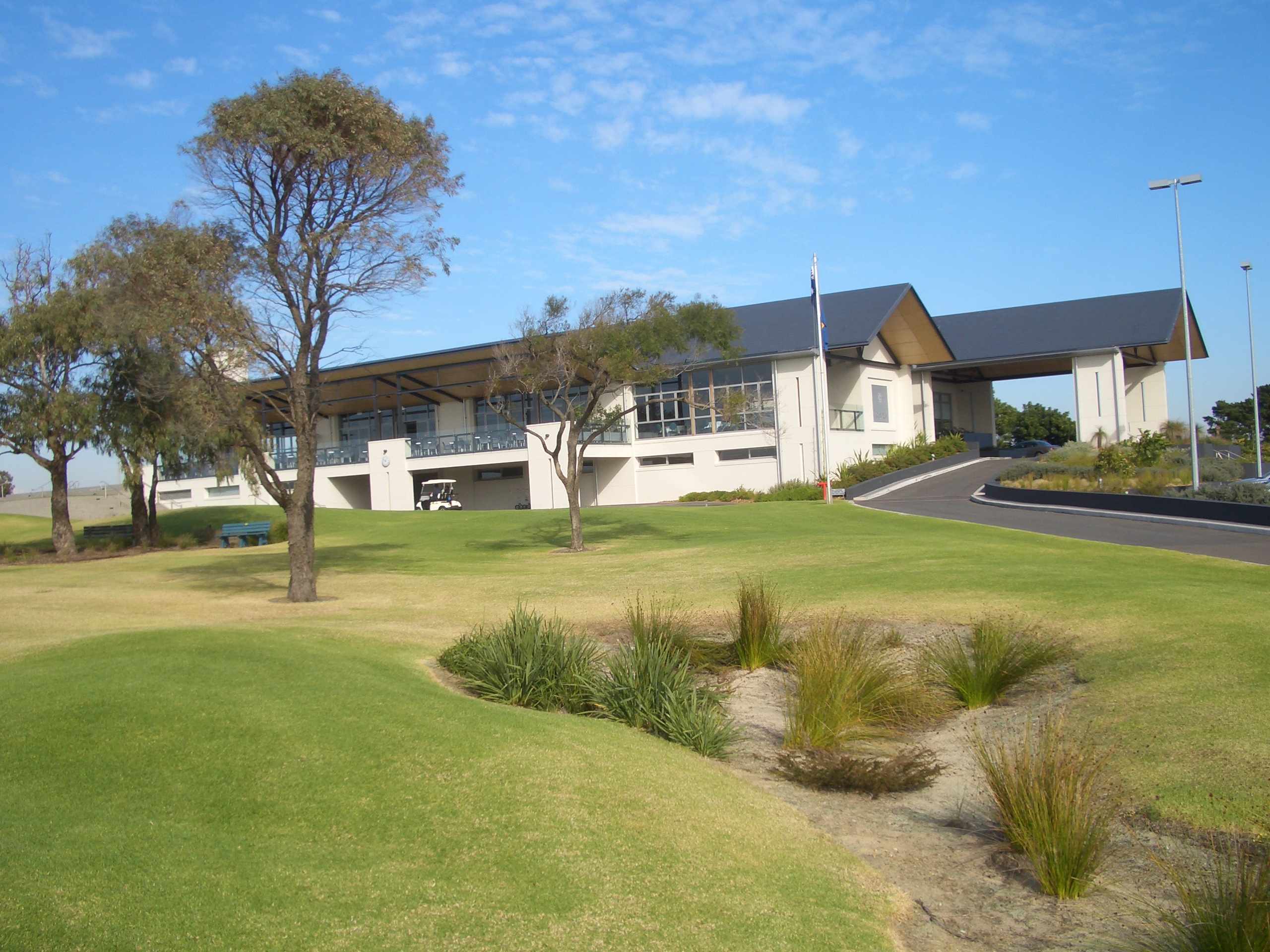
- Clubhouse, The Lakes Golf Club

- Interactive map of Eastlakes
- Country: Australia
- State: New South Wales
- City: Sydney
- LGA: Bayside Council
- Location: 8 km (5.0 mi) south of Sydney CBD

Government
  - State electorates: Heffron; Maroubra
  - Federal division: Kingsford Smith

Area
  - Total: 0.8 km^{2} (0.31 sq mi)
- Elevation: 20 m (66 ft)

Population
  - Total: 6,347 (2021 census)
  - Density: 7,900/km^{2} (20,500/sq mi)
- Postcode: 2018
Suburbs around Eastlakes
Kensington	Kingsford	Daceyville
Rosebery	Eastlakes	Pagewood
Botany	Banksmeadow	Eastgardens

Eastlakes is a suburb of Sydney, in the state of New South Wales, Australia. Eastlakes is located 8 kilometres south of the Sydney central business district, in the local government area of the Bayside Council, Eastlakes is mostly residential with a shopping centre located at Evans Avenue. The residential portion of the suburb falls in the Inner South being west of the Eastern Distributor while the non-residential side of the suburb consisting of The Lakes Golf Course and Botany Dams is east of the Eastern Distributor falling within the Eastern Suburbs, south-east of the CBD.

There is a new shopping centre which opened in 2021 built across the road from the current shopping centre. Now that the new one is complete the current one will be redeveloped in the future. Golf courses also take up part of the suburb.

== History ==
Eastlakes takes its name from the extensive lake system on its southeast and its location in the Eastern Suburbs. The area was once known as Botany Swamps. This was Sydney's third source of water when water was pumped from here to a reservoir in Paddington from 1859.

The lakes were partly reclaimed from the swamp to create the Lakes Golf Course and Sydney Airport extensions. Part of the suburb is on the former site of the Rosebery Racecourse, which was redeveloped in the 1960s into a residential and commercial area. The Racecourse was sold by the Sydney Turf Club to Rosebery Development Corporation Pty Ltd, a Parkes Development Company, for a price of four hundred and fifty thousand pounds on 2 February 1962. Part of the racecourse area is now the site of a park with a memorial to local soldiers and 1st Light Horse Regiment who trained on that site during both world wars.

In the early 1970s a large public meeting was held during which the Parkes Development were accused of duping unit dwellers into believing that nearby open land was to remain a park, only to find that the land was privately owned by the developer. It requested that the NSW Builders Labourers Federation place a green ban on the site, which it did with the result that the area remains as parkland.

== Housing ==
The Eastlakes area is mainly working class, with the north-east of the suburb, adjacent to the shopping centre, being made up of medium-density affordable flats with large immigrant populations mainly from Turkey and Bangladesh, surrounded by three large public housing estates; Rosebery Apartments (two 10 story concrete maisonette blocks), Eastlakes Apartments (two 10 storey redbrick apartment blocks and 2 storey flat complex) and Longworth Court (5 Story and 3 story flat blocks adjacent to a Radburn complex), home to four high-rise towers and a large unit complex on the border with Daceyville. On the northern side of Grafton Street there are mostly apartments, while on the southern side of Grafton Street there are separate houses that are mainly one storey high.

About 17% of Eastlakes is public housing, being home to three different high density public housing estates and numerous public flats integrated with privately owned affordable ones.

== Demographics ==
According to 2021 census, the most common ancestries in Eastlakes were English 12.5%, Australian 12.2%, Chinese 9.8%, Greek 8.9% and Bangladeshi 6.0%. 42.6% of people were born in Australia. The next most common countries of birth were Bangladesh 6.1%, Indonesia 4.3%, China 3.0%, Philippines 2.9% and Greece 2.6%. 38.4% of people spoke only English at home. Other languages spoken at home included Bengali 8.1%, Greek 6.8%, Indonesian 4.1%, Turkish 3.7% and Spanish 3.2%. The most common responses for religion were Catholic 25.0%, No Religion 17.8%, Islam 15.9% and Eastern Orthodox 11.3%.

== Schools ==
Eastlakes Public School began as an infants school in 1938 and was located in a church hall in O'Connor Street. It moved to Florence Avenue in 1944. When Rosebery Racecourse was demolished and the land developed as a residential area, enrolments at the school naturally increased and there was a need for a primary school, so Eastlakes included a primary school from 1979.

== Churches ==
The area is served by three churches as of 2009. St Stephen's Anglican Church is located in Harry Street. Horner Memorial Hall, King Street, is a chapel in the Federation Carpenter Gothic style, which is used by Beckenham Memorial Uniting Church after relocating from their church after June 2015. and an LDS Church which is located in Mascot Drive.

== Sport and recreation ==
This area is home to several parks and golf courses. The parks are Eastlakes reserve at Barber Ave, Bridget Tight reserve at Evans Ave, Edmund Thornton reserve at O'Rourke cres, Leon Lackal reserve at Maloney st, Southern Cross Drive reserve at evans ave, Vernon avenue reserve at Vernon ave and Sparks street reserve at sparks st. The Lakes Golf Club and Eastlake Golf Course fall within the boundaries of the suburb of Eastlakes. Bonnie Doon Golf Club, Mutch Park and Astrolabe Park are located in the adjacent suburb of Pagewood. There is also a Scout group at Sparks street.

== Transportation ==
The nearest train station is the Mascot railway station in Mascot and it is about 3 km away from Eastlakes. The nearest light rail stop is the Juniors Kingsford light rail stop in Kingsford and it is about 2 km away from Eastlakes.

== Shopping Centre ==
The older Eastlakes Shopping Centre was closed for redevelopment in 2025, with Conquest planning to replace the existing single-storey structure with the Queensbridge shopping centre and residential towers.

== Gallery ==
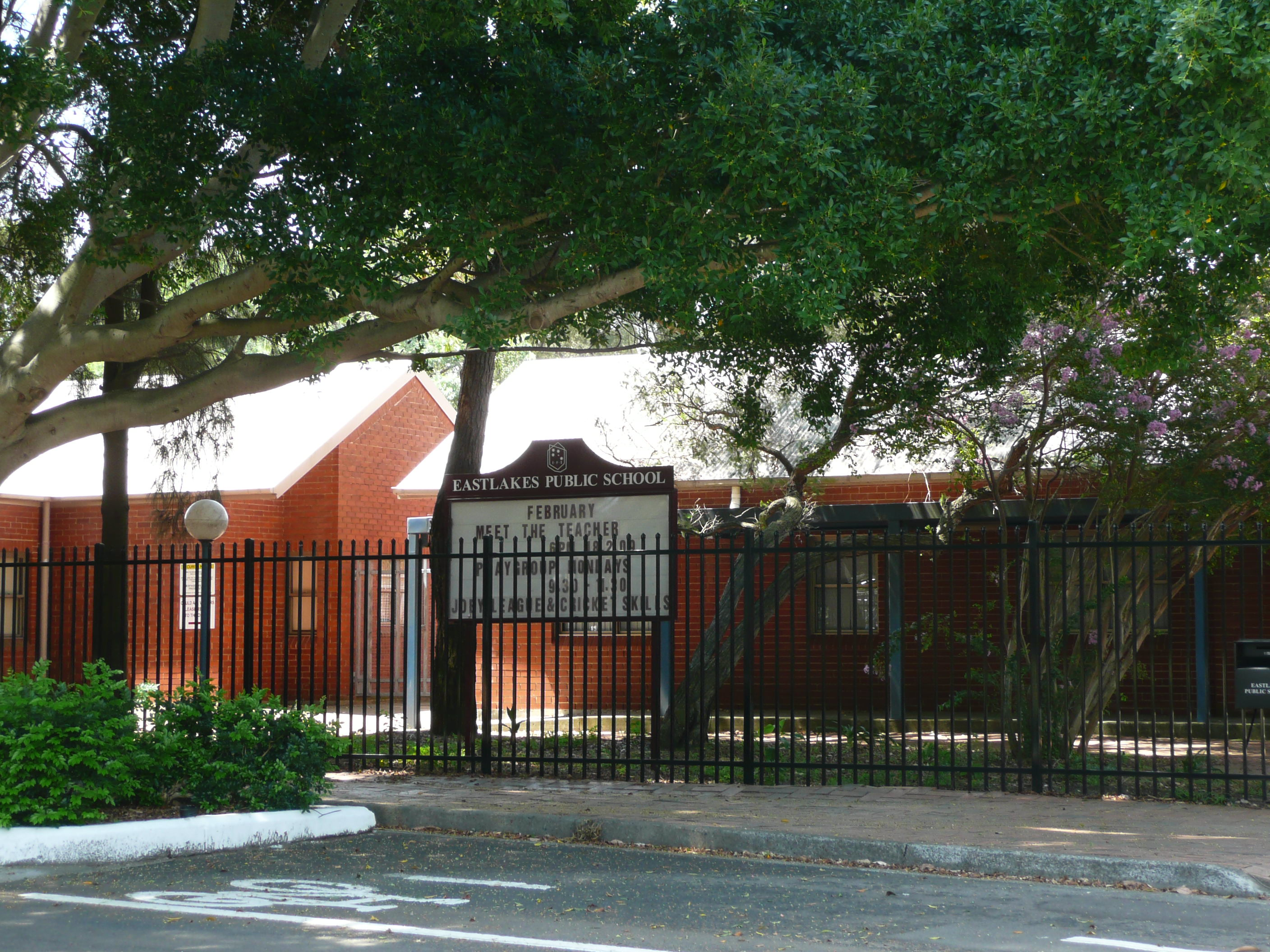
Eastlakes Public School, Florence Avenue

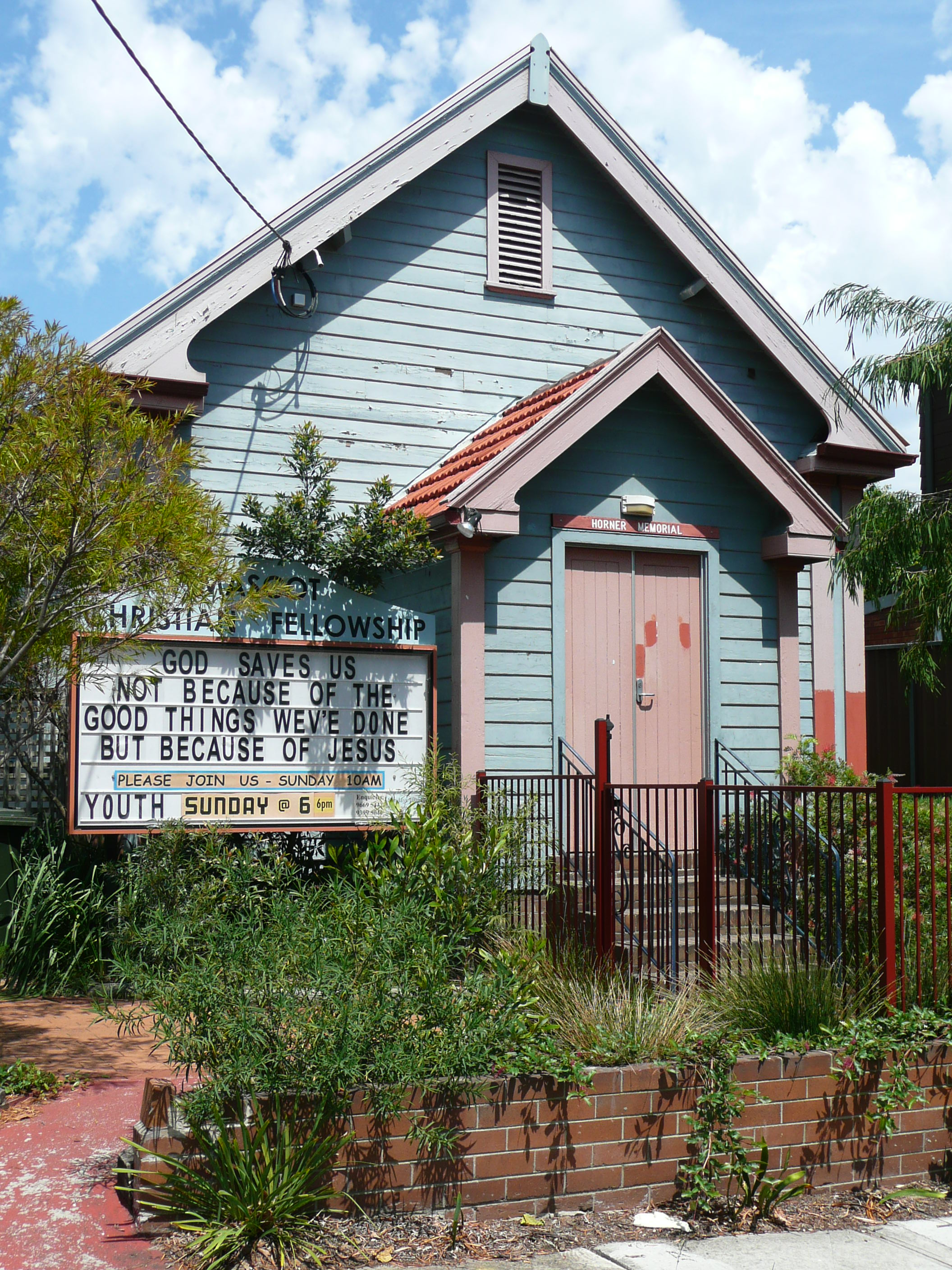
Horner Memorial Hall, King Street

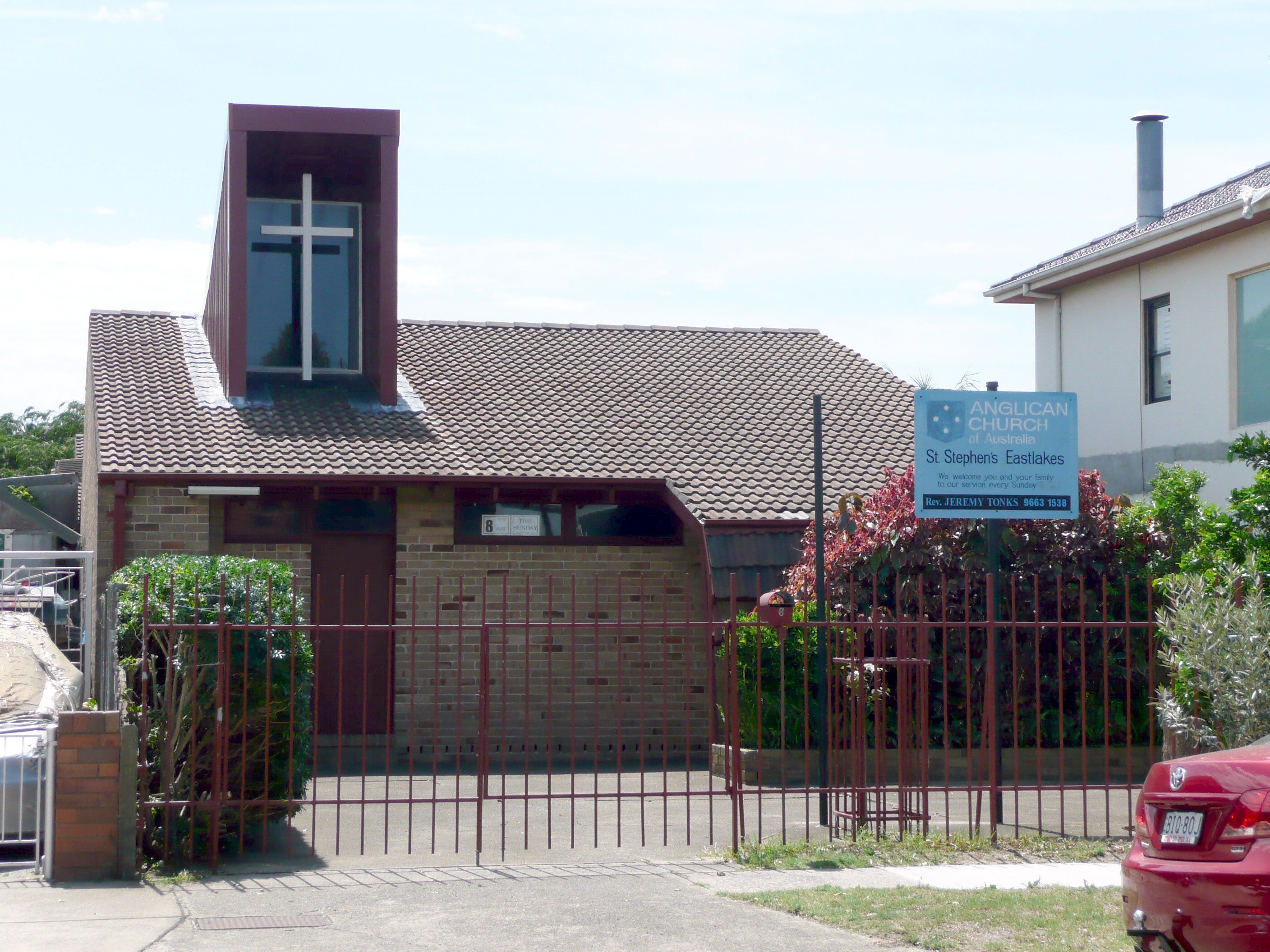
St Stephen's Anglican Church, Harry Street

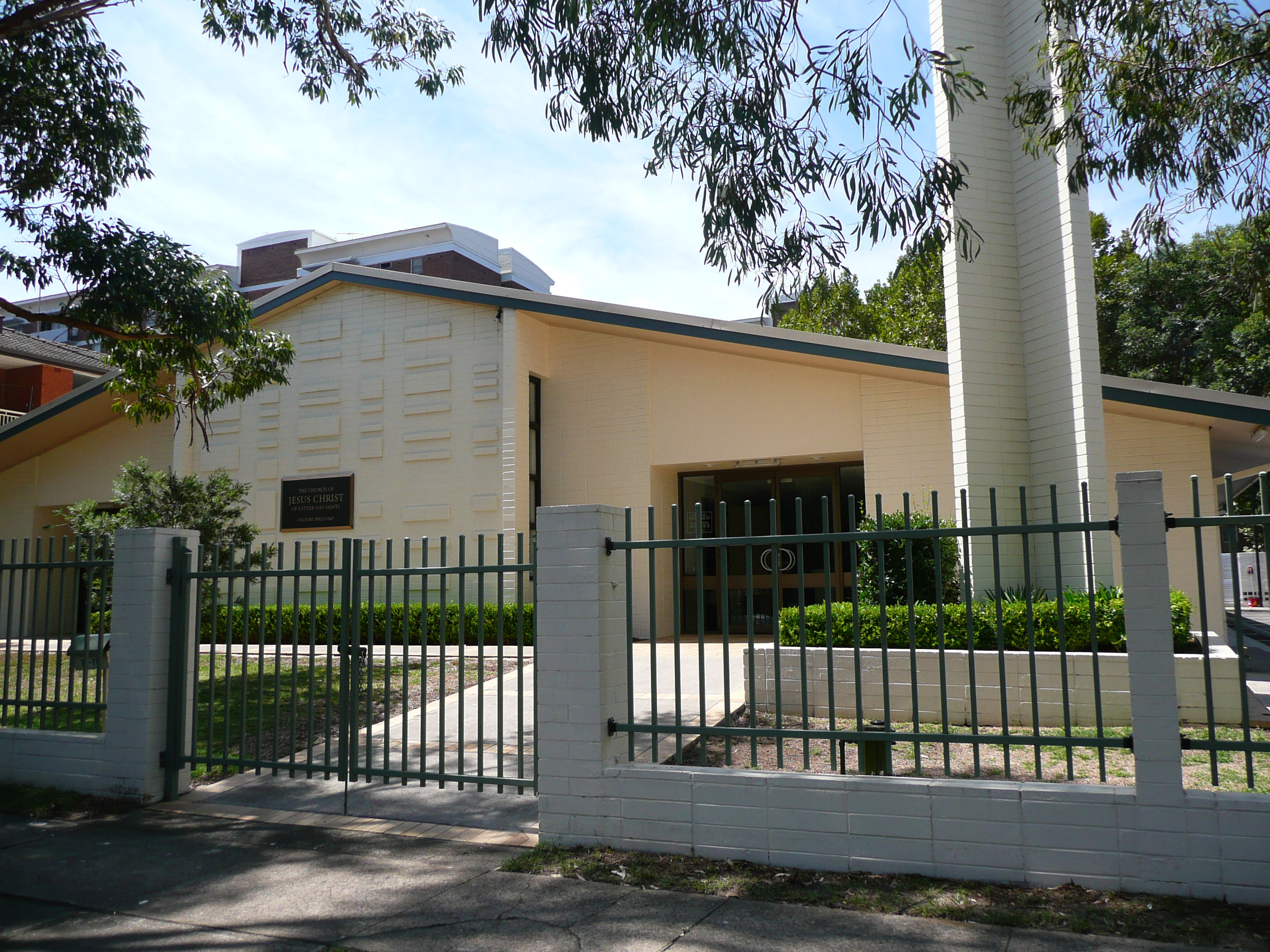
LDS Church, Mascot Drive

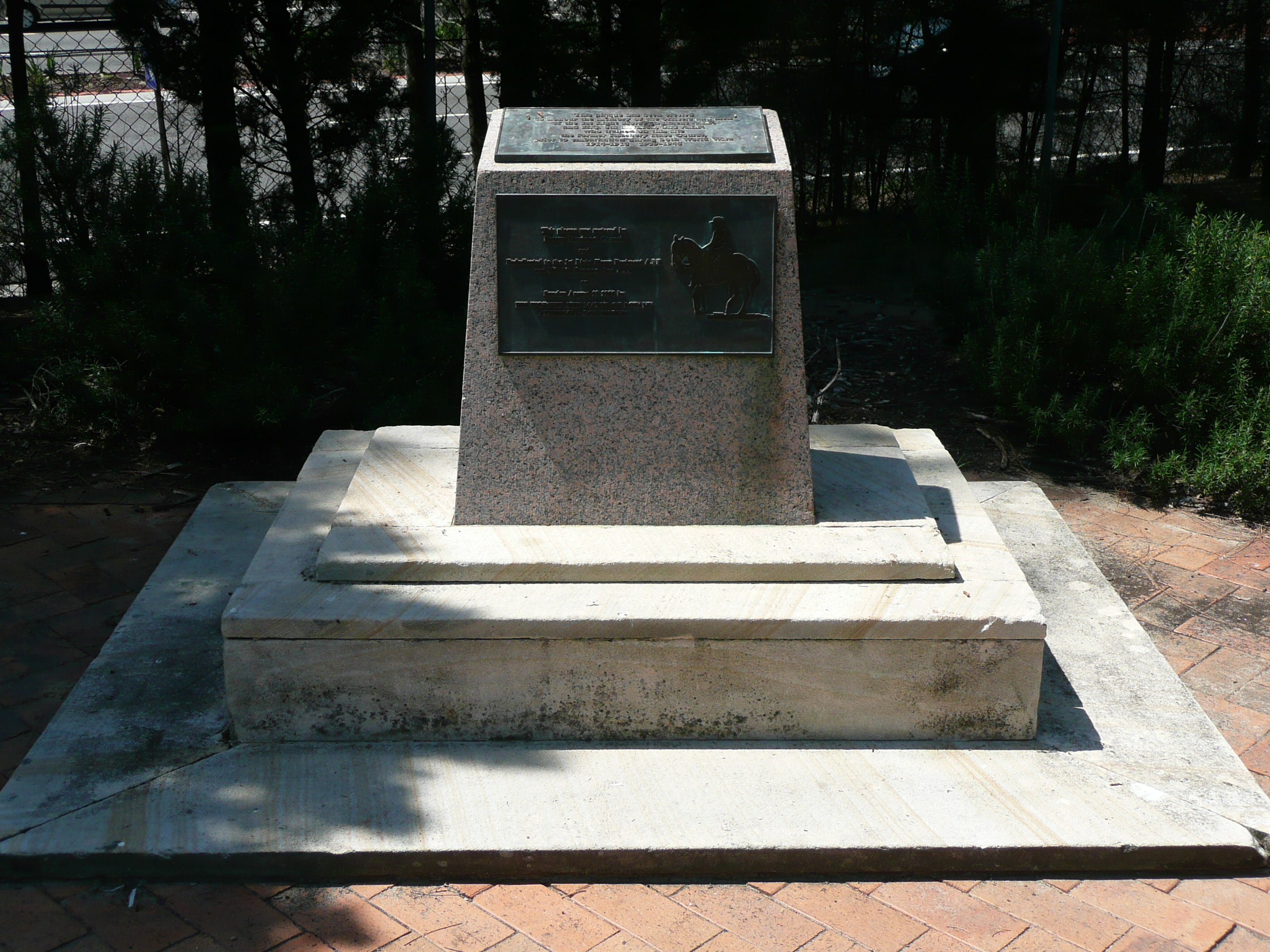
War memorial on former racecourse site, Florence Avenue

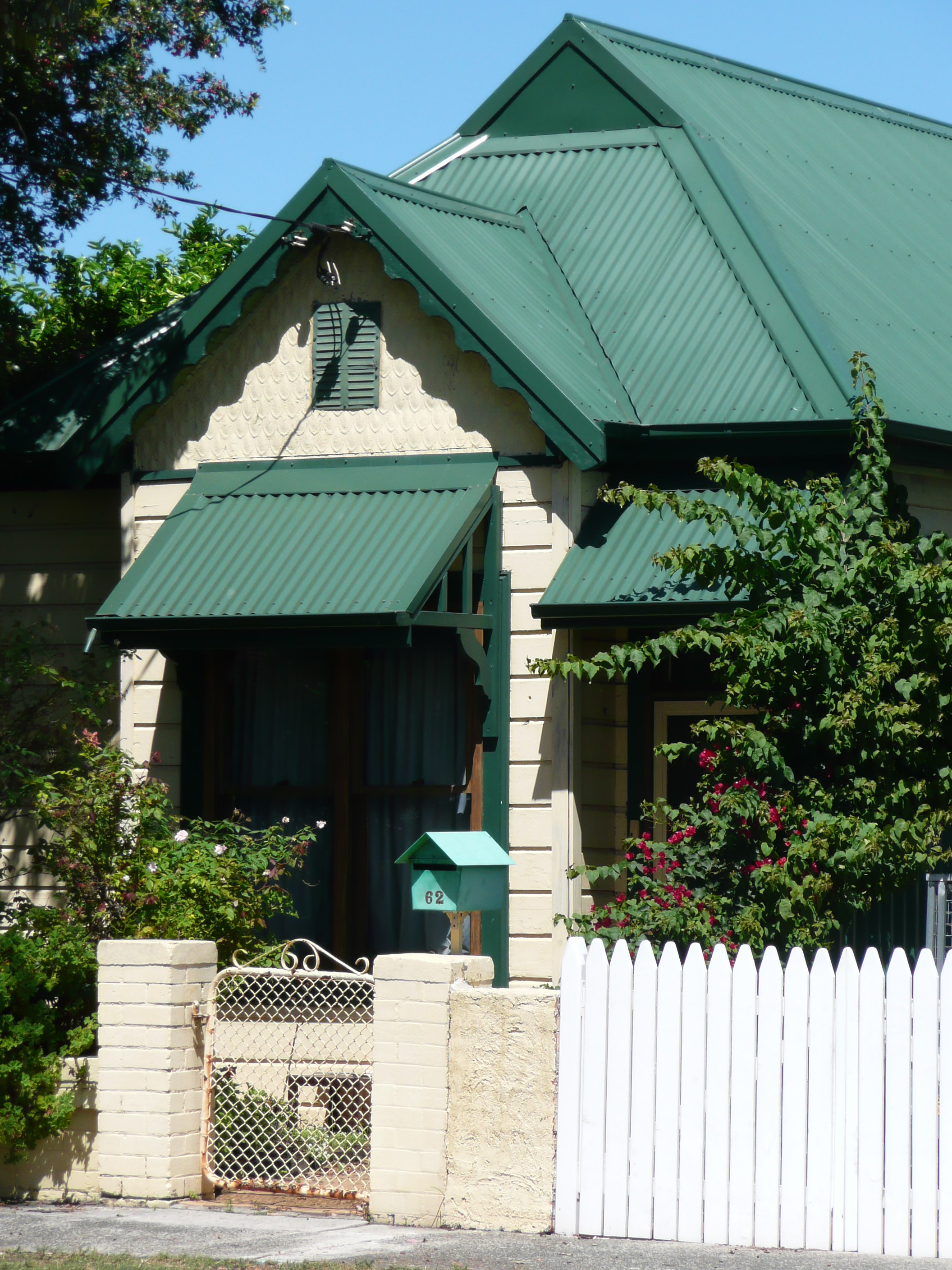
Weatherboard cottage, King Street

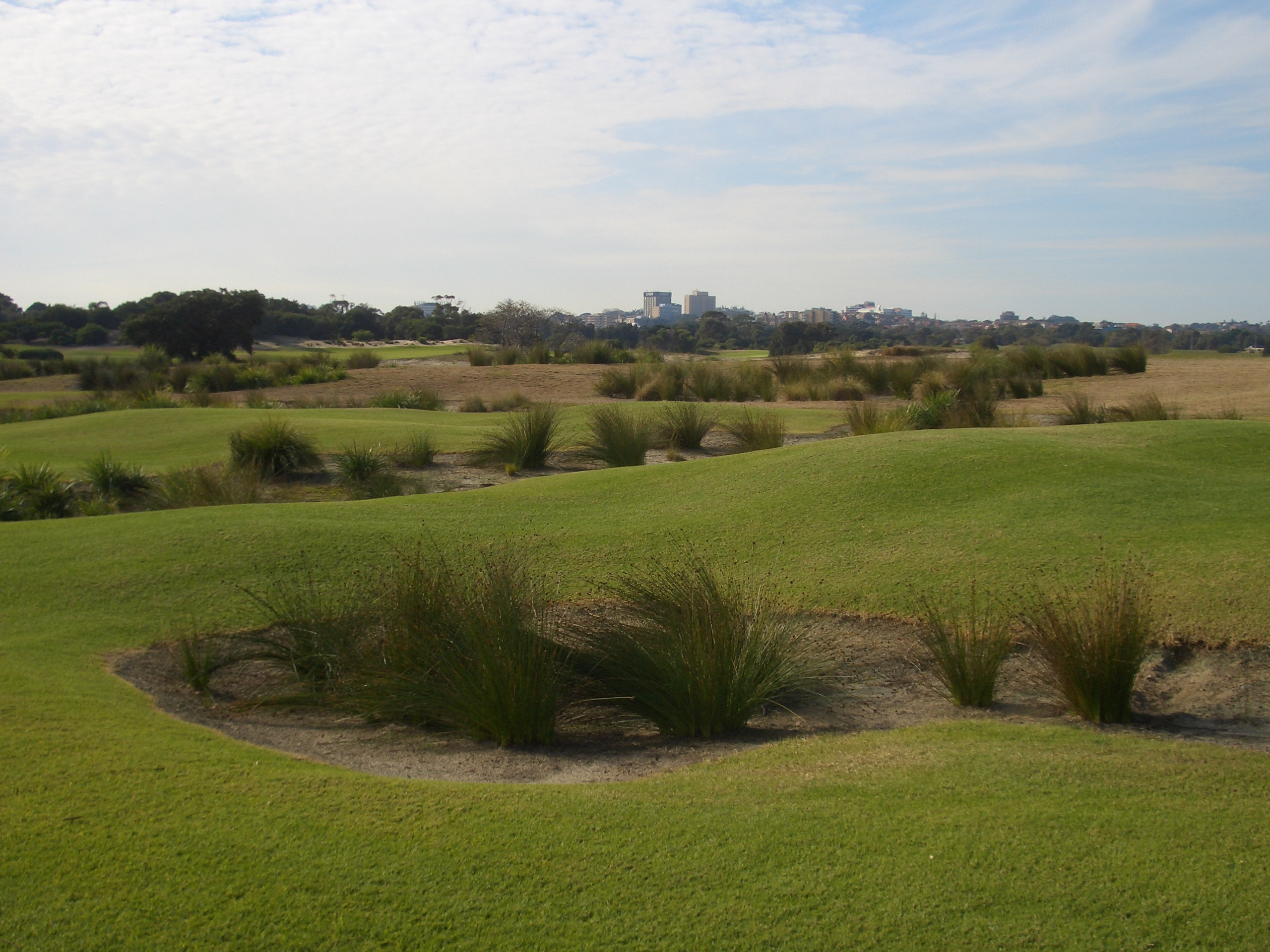
Eastlake Golf Course
