= Eastern Suburbs (Sydney) =

Region of Sydney, New South Wales, Australia

- Region
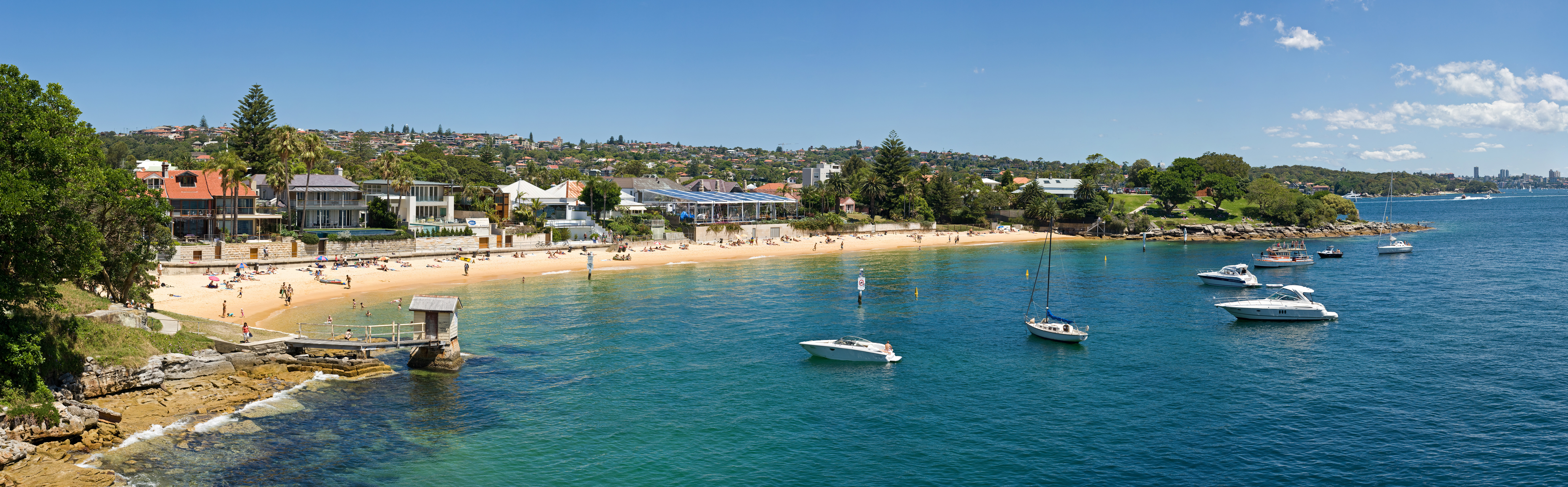
- Camp Cove, Watsons Bay
- Country: Australia
- State: New South Wales
- LGAs: Municipality of Woollahra; Waverley Council; City of Randwick; Bayside Council (part); City of Sydney (part)

Government
  - State electorate: Vaucluse; Coogee; Maroubra; Heffron (part); Sydney (part)
  - Federal division: Wentworth; Kingsford Smith; Sydney (part)

Population
  - Total: 267,037 (2016 census)

The Eastern Suburbs is the eastern metropolitan region of Sydney, New South Wales, Australia.

== Location ==
Informally, references to "eastern suburbs" are often limited only to the area east of the Sydney Central Business District, one of the earliest areas developed beyond the town centre. However, the Eastern Suburbs of Sydney in the more expansive sense refers to the whole area situated to the east and south-east of the Sydney central business district, around the southern shore of Sydney Harbour to the Pacific Ocean beaches and continuing on to the port at Botany Bay and La Perouse. The region is sometimes defined as all of the suburbs within local government areas of the Municipality of Woollahra, Waverley Council and City of Randwick as well as eastern parts of Bayside Council and City of Sydney. Some suburbs in the City of Sydney and Bayside Council which are south of Central station, west of the Eastern Distributor and north of the Airport Starting with Redfern and ending in Mascot are sometimes included in this region, even though these suburbs are neither east nor south-east of Sydney CBD. The region corresponds with the Parish of Alexandria and the Parish of Botany, two cadastral parishes used for land title purposes.

For statistical purposes, the Australian Bureau of Statistics (ABS) limits its definition of the "Eastern Suburbs" statistical area (Statistical Area level 4) to comprising just the Woollahra, Waverley and Randwick local government areas. As at the 2021 census, this ABS region had an estimated population of 261,410, up from 249,546 in the 2011 census. The "Eastern Suburbs" statistical area is further divided into:

- "Eastern Suburbs - North" Statistical Area Level 3, which includes Woollahra Council, Waverley Council and The Centennial Parklands with postcodes 2021 to 2030.
- "Eastern Suburbs - South" Statistical Area Level 3, which includes most of City of Randwick with postcodes 2031 to 2036.

Outside the "Eastern Suburbs" statistical area, the ABS defines the "Botany" Statistical Area Level 3, which includes the part of Bayside Council that used to be City of Botany Bay along with Port Botany which is part of City of Randwick. The "Botany" statistical area is part of the "Sydney - City and Inner South" Statistical Area Level 4.

== Landmarks ==
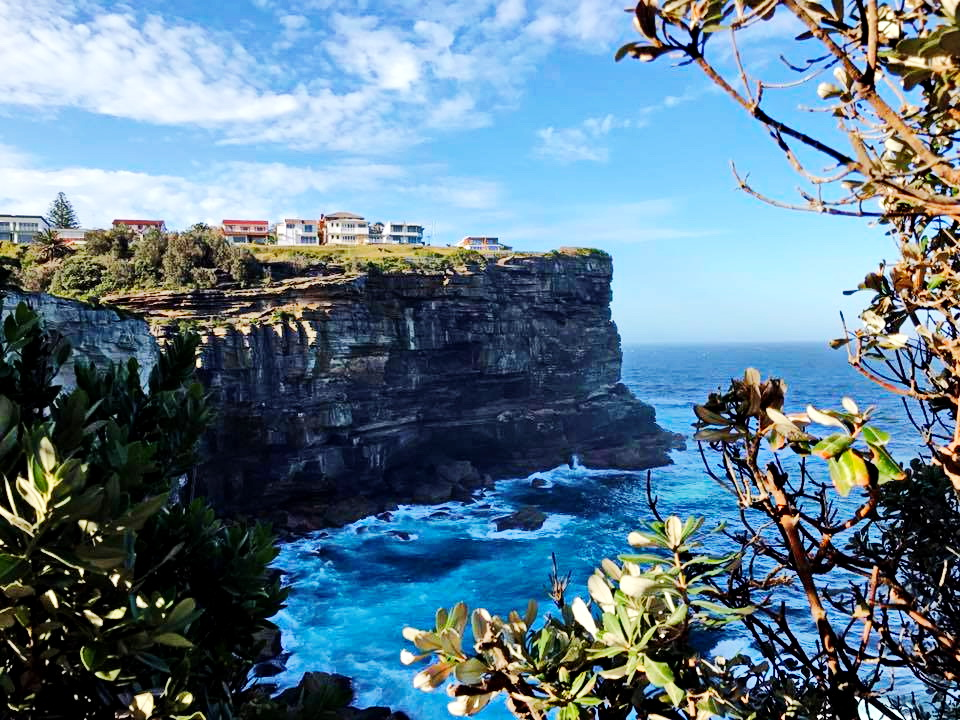
Clifftop suburban area

The largest commercial areas linking the Eastern Suburbs are found at Bondi Junction, Double Bay, Randwick, and Maroubra Junction. These hubs provide transport, services, restaurants, residential space, retail space and office space.

Shopping centres include Westfield Bondi Junction, Eastgate Bondi Junction, Eastpoint Food Fair at Edgecliff Centre, Supa Centa in Moore Park, Royal Randwick Shopping Centre, Pacific Square in Maroubra, Southpoint in Hillsdale and Westfield Eastgardens which is the largest centre in the south-east, Westfield Bondi Junction being the largest overall.

Popular commercial localities in the Eastern Suburbs include Charing Cross, Five Ways in Paddington, Kings Cross and The Spot.

The Eastern Suburbs features some of Sydney's well-known beaches and tourist destinations. These include: Double Bay Beach, Redleaf Pool, Lady Martins Beach, Rose Bay Beach, Shark Beach, Parsley Bay Beach, Kutti Beach, Camp Cove Beach, Lady Bay Beach, Watsons Bay, Bondi Beach, Tamarama Beach, Bronte Beach, Clovelly Beach, Gordon's Bay, Coogee Beach, Maroubra Beach, Malabar Beach, Little Bay Beach, Little Congwong Beach, Congwong Beach, Frenchmans Beach, La Perouse and Yarra Bay Beach.

Randwick Racecourse is a popular recreational spot for residents in the Eastern Suburbs and is the largest racetrack in New South Wales.

The region is home to the Malabar Wastewater Treatment Plant, which is one of the largest wastewater treatment facilities in Sydney.

Port Botany is located in the south of the region and is the largest container port in New South Wales.

Sydney's eastern university is the University of New South Wales, located in Kensington, and is a member of the Group of Eight. Across the road within the same suburb of Kensington is the National Institute of Dramatic Arts.

The major hospitals serving the Eastern Suburbs are St Vincent's Hospital in Darlinghurst, with the largest hospital being Prince of Wales Hospital in Randwick.

== Transport ==
Railways in the region include the Eastern Suburbs railway line and the CBD and South East Light Rail.

The Eastern Suburbs railway line which opened in 1979 has stations at Martin Place, Kings Cross, Edgecliff and terminates at Bondi Junction. The Eastern Suburbs railway was originally intended to include more stations and to reach as far as Kingsford or Daceyville, but the route was shortened due to budget constraints.

The CBD and South East Light Rail splits at Moore Park. One branch which opened in 2019 terminates at Prince of Wales Hospital in Randwick. The other branch which opened in 2020 terminates at The Juniors leagues club in Kingsford. The light rail takes residents of both of these suburbs as well as Kensington to Circular Quay via Moore Park, Surry Hills and the CBD through George Street.

Transdev Sydney Ferries operate services to Darling Point, Double Bay, Rose Bay and Watsons Bay.

Bus services are operated by Transdev John Holland and Transit Systems NSW for the eastern and south-eastern suburbs.

Major roads connecting the Eastern Suburbs to the CBD include New South Head Road, Oxford Street and Syd Einfeld Drive with Bunnerong Road, Anzac Parade and the Eastern Distributor being the major connectors for the south-east and Airport. Other main roads in the Eastern Suburbs include Old South Head Road and Bondi Road.

== Sporting teams ==
In the National Rugby League, the Eastern Suburbs is represented by the Sydney Roosters playing out of the Sydney Football Stadium in Moore Park with their leagues club 'Easts' being based in Bondi. Traditionally they represented the whole of the Eastern Suburbs but over time due to junior team boundaries changing (of which to this day still causes much debate) their area is now usually agreed to represent at least down to the Randwick/ Coogee region (officially the articles of association from 1908 still have not changed meaning at a senior level they do still technically represent all of the Eastern Suburbs). Maroubra down to La Perouse is where the South Sydney Rabbitohs are often supported instead, and do represent this part of the area according to NSWRL Junior District Boundaries. Although being based in the inner southern suburb of Redfern the South Sydney Rabbitohs have leagues clubs called 'The Juniors' in Kingsford, Maroubra and Malabar. They however play their home games in Sydney's West at Accor Stadium in Sydney Olympic Park.

In the Australian Football League, the Sydney Swans are a professional Australian rules football club. The Swans' headquarters and training facilities are located at the Sydney Cricket Ground, the club's playing home ground since 1982.

The NSW Blues are a professional first class men's cricket team also based at the Sydney Cricket Ground. The team competes in the Sheffield Shield Australia's first class interstate cricket competition.

The Sydney Sixers are a NSW professional franchise men's cricket team based at Sydney Cricket Ground, competing in Australia's domestic Twenty20 cricket competition, the Big Bash League.

The Eastern Suburbs Football Association (ESFA) is the delegated authority governing soccer in the Eastern Suburbs of Sydney. ESFA offers women's competitions including AAW Premier League running from April through to August.

== Representative government ==
The Eastern Suburbs includes several local government areas including Municipality of Woollahra, Waverley Council, the City of Randwick and parts of Bayside Council. The part of Bayside Council within the Eastern Suburbs was formerly governed by the City of Botany Bay, which amalgamated with the City of Rockdale (on the western shore of Botany Bay) to form Bayside Council in 2016.

At the state government level, the Eastern Suburbs covers a number of electorates in the lower house. From south to north, these are the Electoral Districts of Maroubra, Heffron, Coogee, Vaucluse and (partly) Sydney. The political allegiances of these electorates reflect the socio-demographic difference between the different parts of the Eastern Suburbs. Vaucluse, covering the northern Eastern Suburbs, is a safe electorate for the Liberal Party of Australia and has elected a member from the Liberal Party or one of its predecessor conservative parties since it was established in its current form in 1927. The electorates of Maroubra and Heffron in the south are safe electorates for the Australian Labor Party and have elected members from the Labor Party since each of them was established. The electorate of Coogee is historically a marginal electorate but has been held by the Labor Party since 2019. Sydney, being an inner-city electorate, has elected independent members since it was re-established in its current form in 2007.

At the federal government level, the Eastern Suburbs covers the Division of Wentworth (north) and the Division of Kingsford Smith (south). Wentworth, historically a safe conservative seat, is currently held by a Teal independent, Allegra Spender. The Division of Kingsford Smith is a safe Labor seat and has been held by the Labor Party since the establishment of the electorate in 1949.

== Suburbs in the Eastern Suburbs ==
Postcode	Suburb(s)
2010	Darlinghurst, Surry Hills
2011	Elizabeth Bay, Potts Point, Rushcutters Bay, Woolloomooloo
2018	Eastlakes (East of Eastern Distributor)
2019	Banksmeadow, Botany
2021	Centennial Park, Moore Park, Paddington
2022	Bondi Junction, Queens Park
2023	Bellevue Hill
2024	Bronte, Waverley
2025	Woollahra
2026	Bondi, North Bondi, Bondi Beach, Tamarama
2027	Darling Point, Edgecliff, Point Piper
2028	Double Bay
2029	Rose Bay
2030	Dover Heights, Vaucluse, Watsons Bay
2031	Clovelly, Randwick
2032	Kingsford, Daceyville
2033	Kensington
2034	Coogee, South Coogee
2035	Maroubra, Pagewood
2036	Chifley, Eastgardens, Hillsdale, La Perouse, Little Bay, Malabar, Matraville, Phillip Bay, Port Botany
2052	University of New South Wales

== Gallery ==
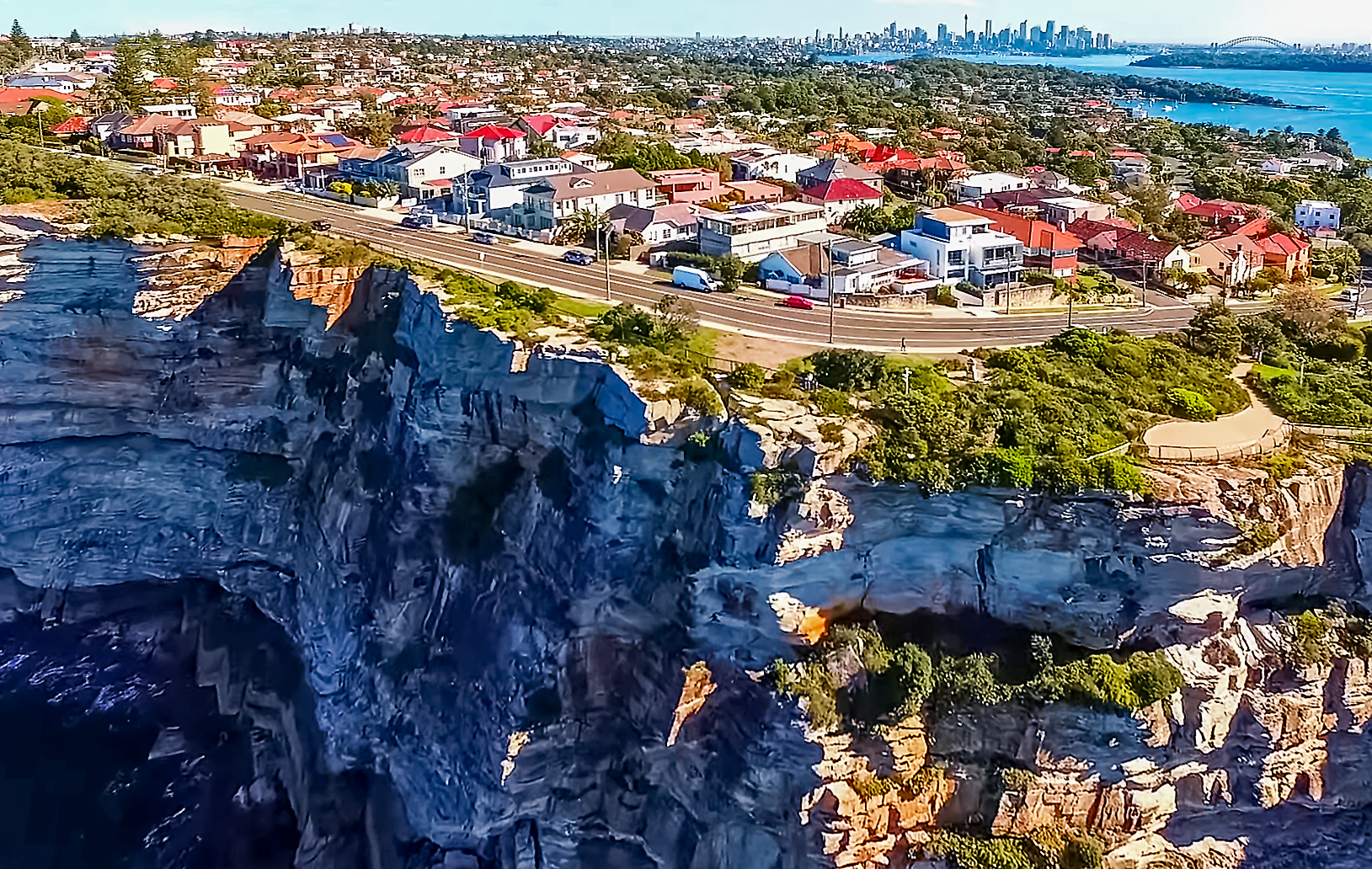
Clifftop homes, Vaucluse

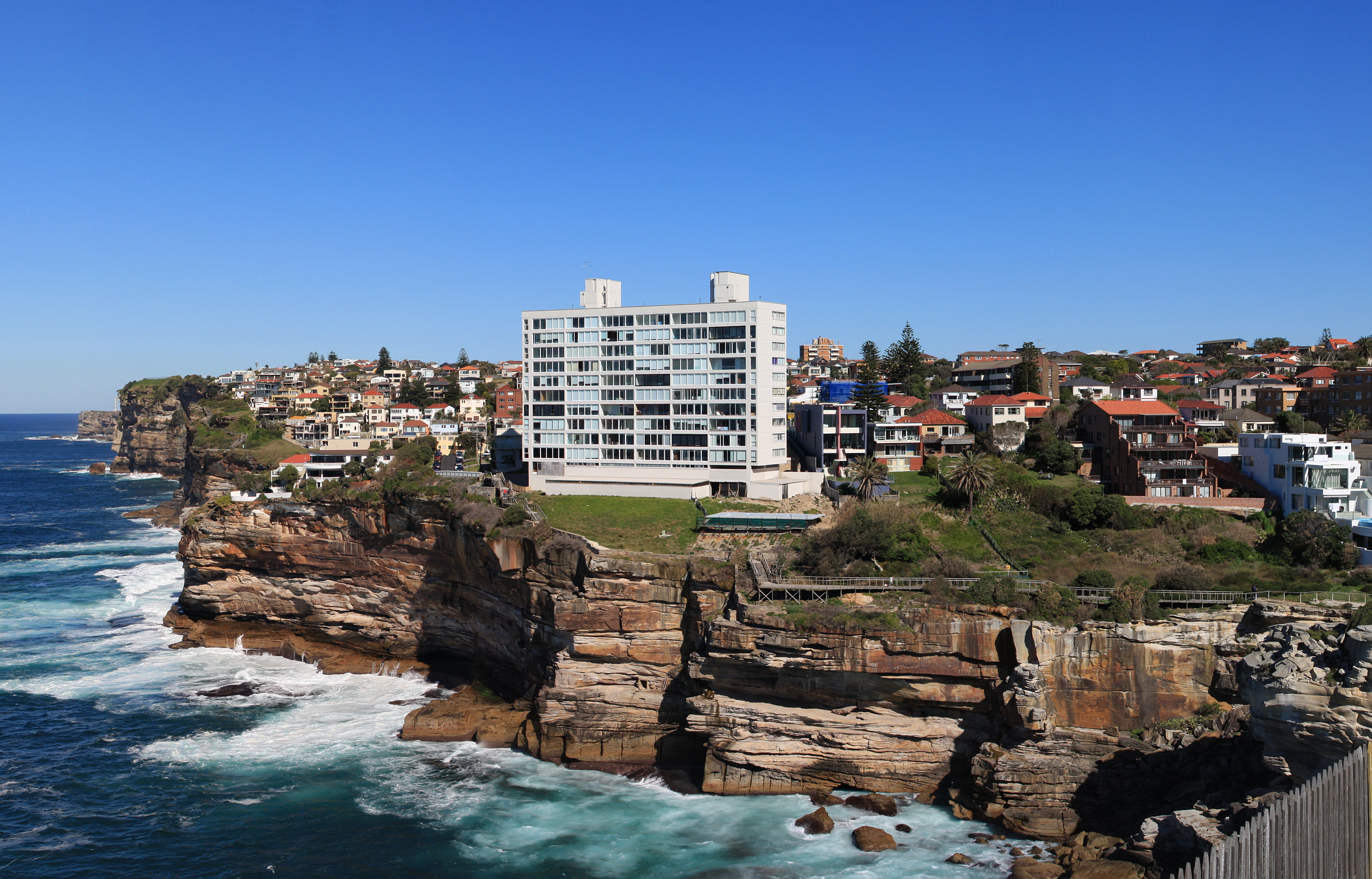
Dover Heights

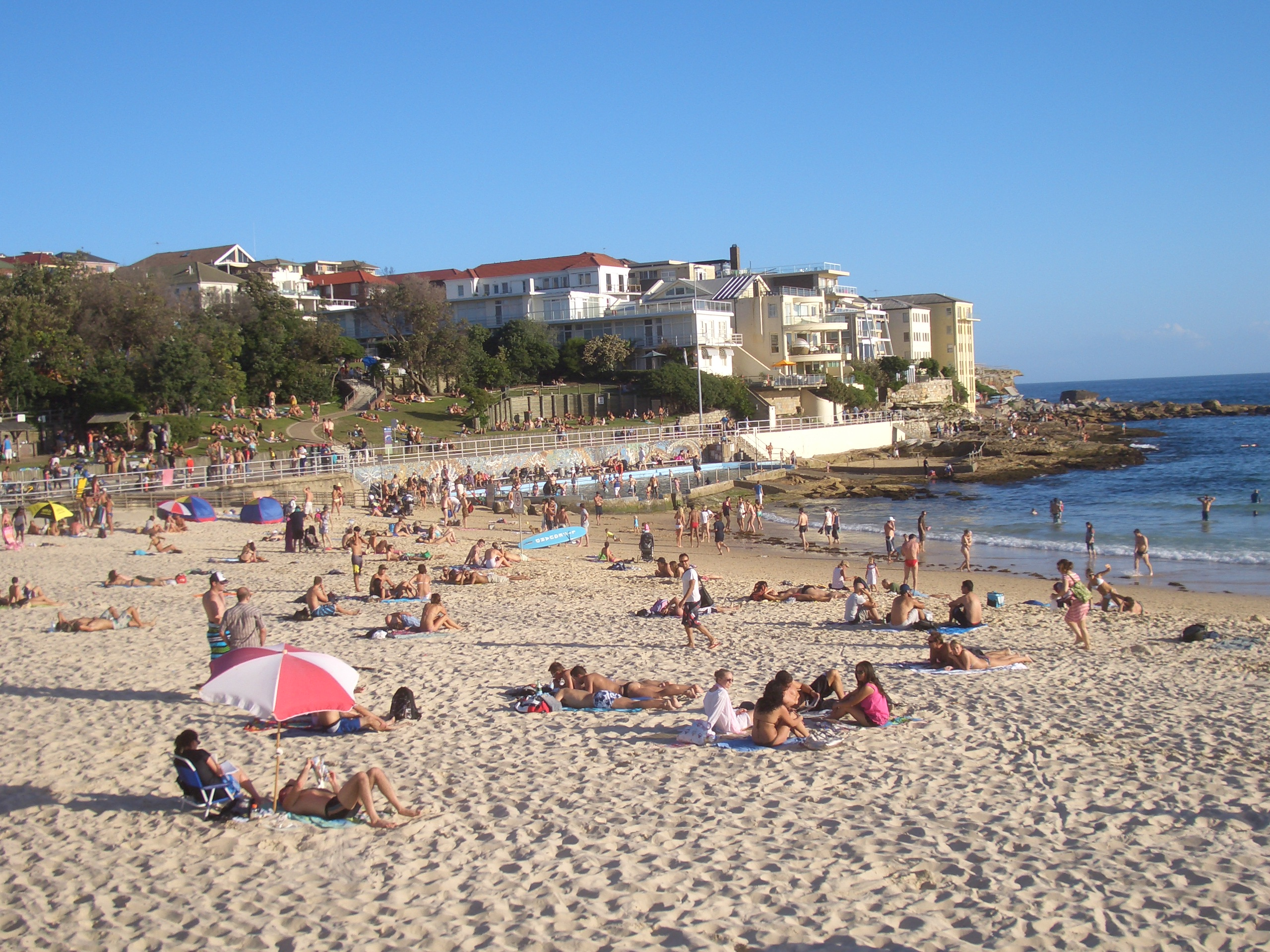
North Bondi Beach

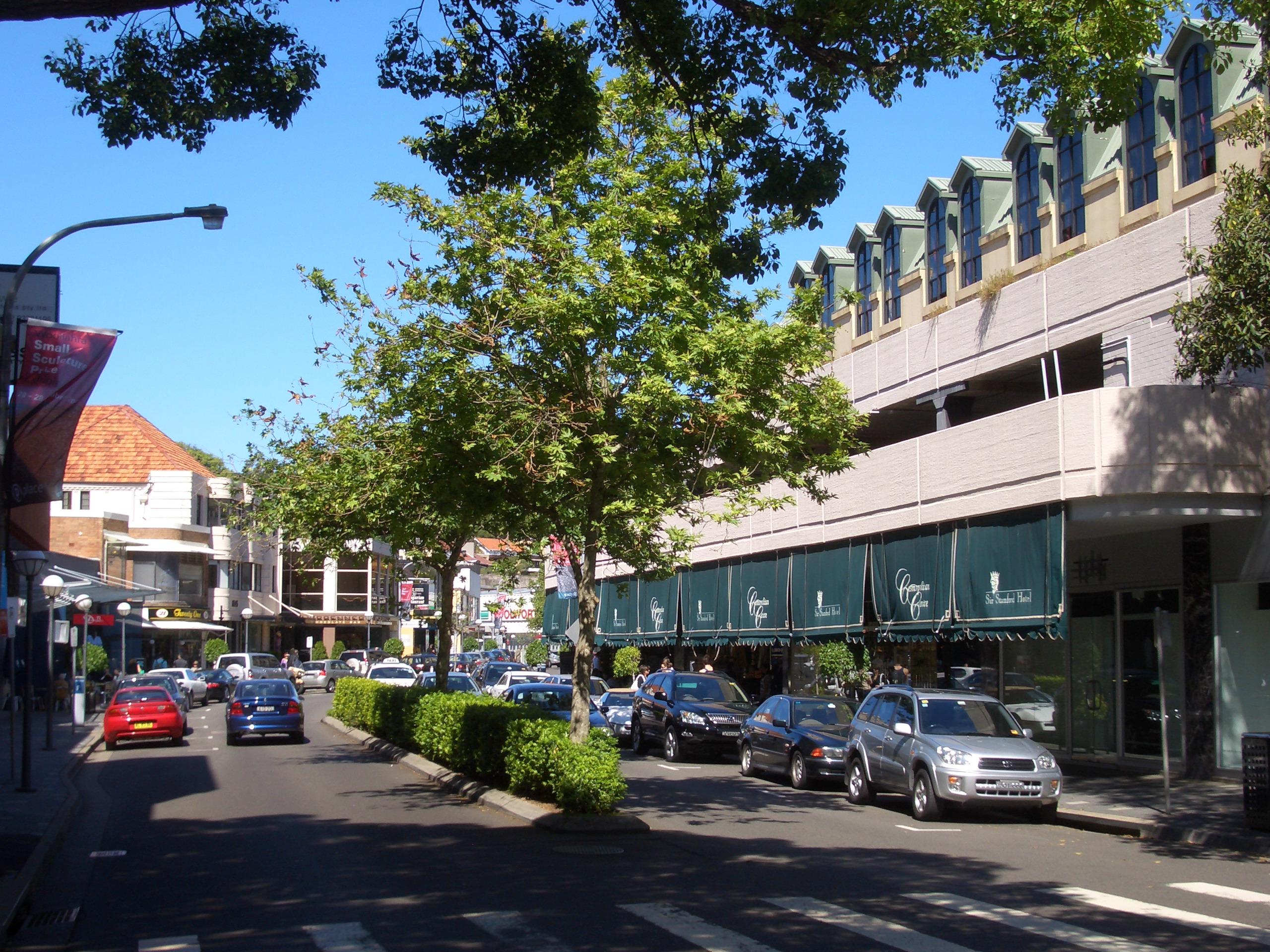
Knox Street, Double Bay

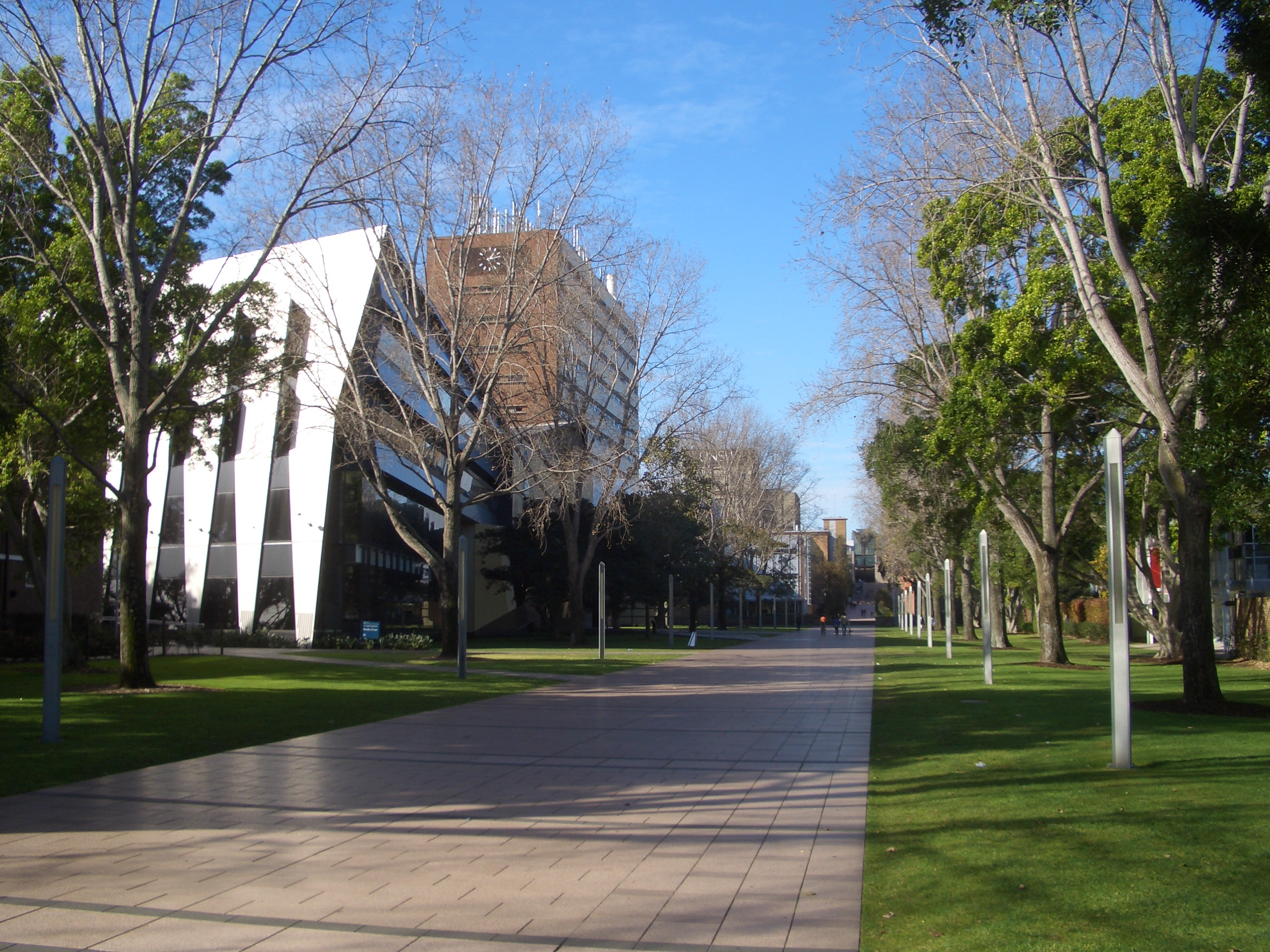
University of New South Wales

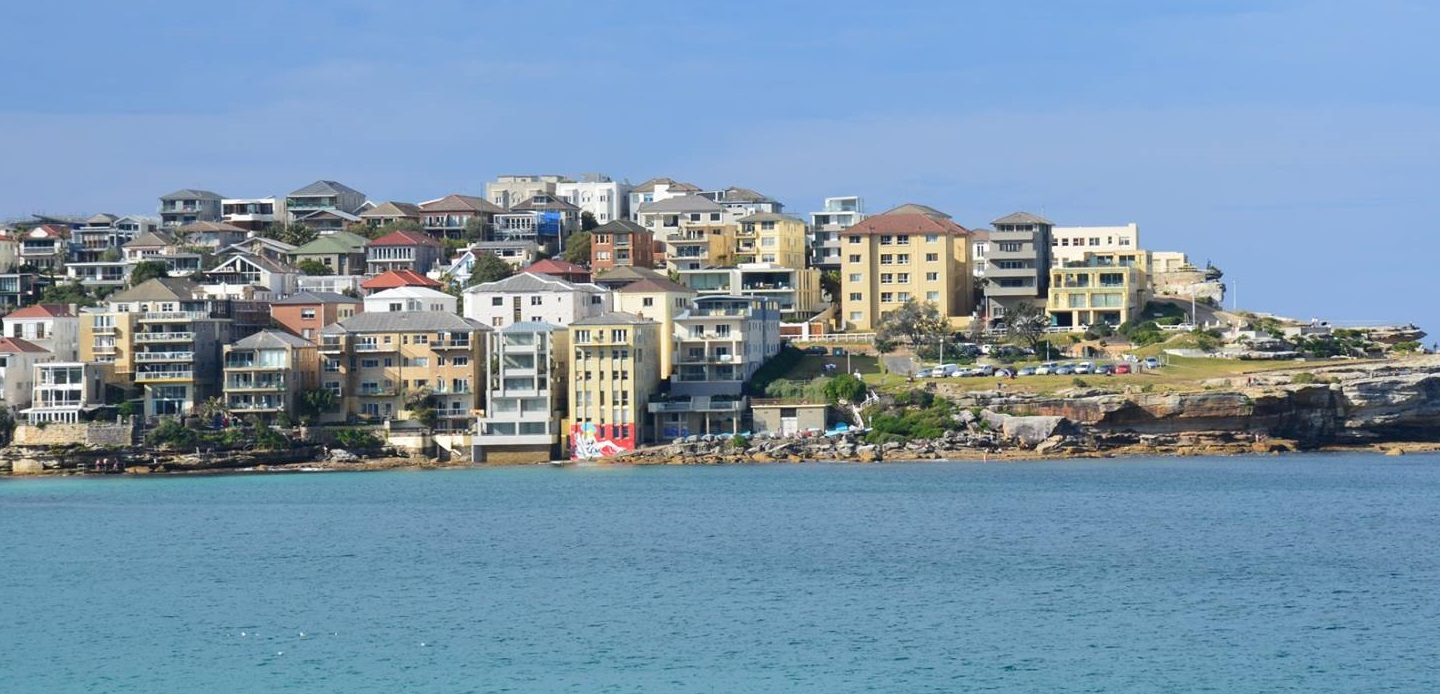
North Bondi apartments

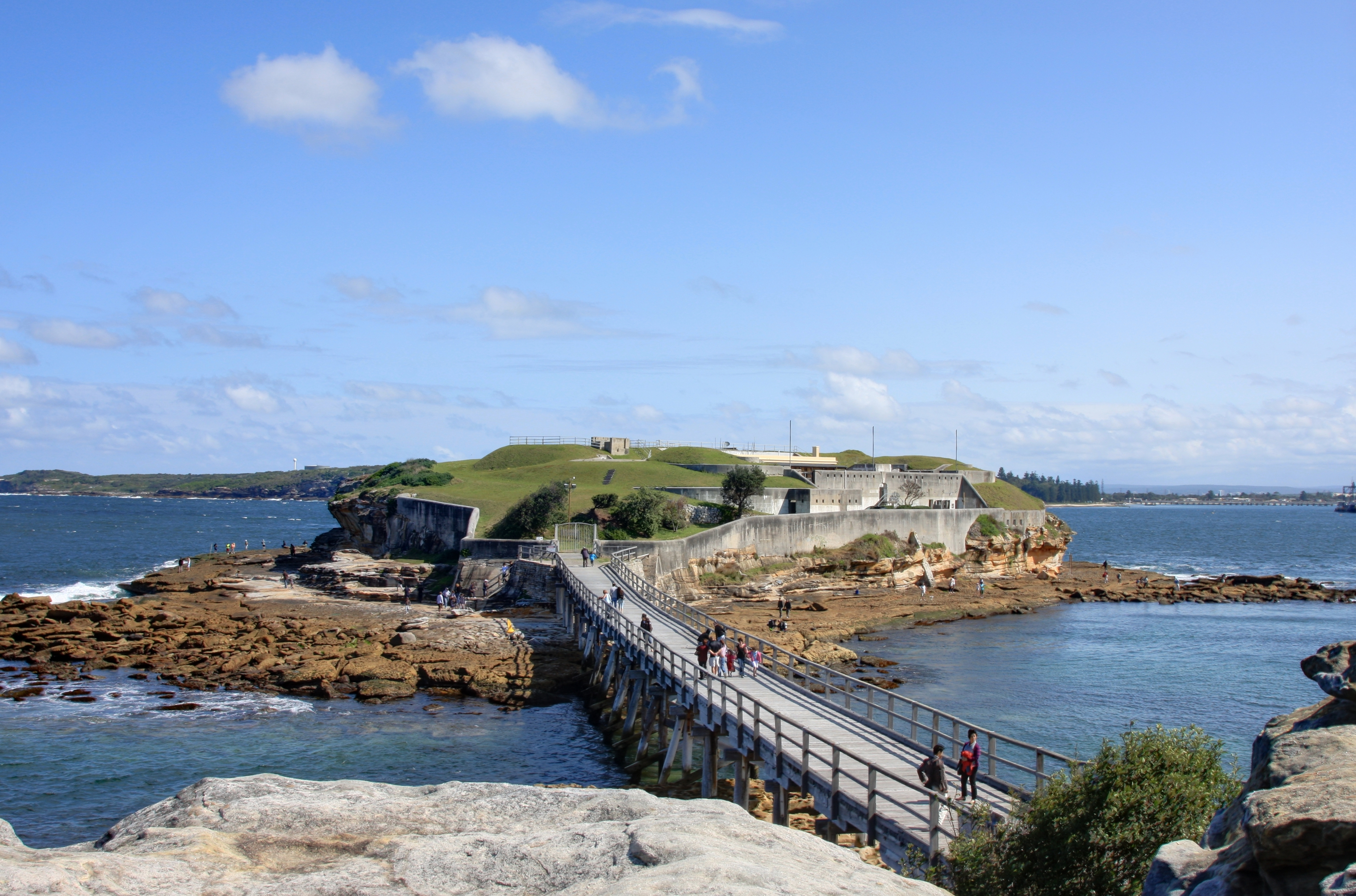
Bare Island at La Perouse

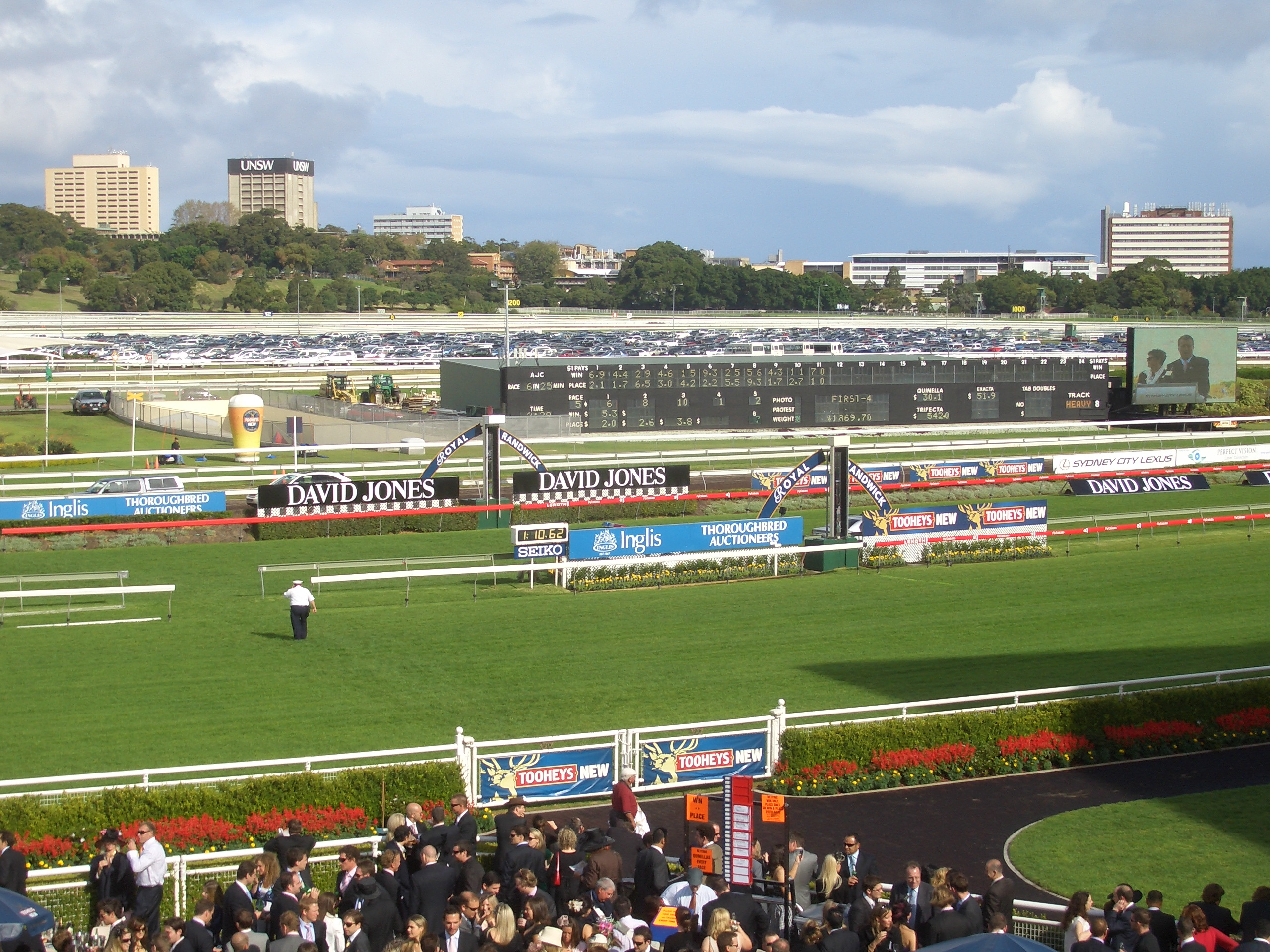
Royal Randwick Racecourse
