= Southpoint Shopping Centre =

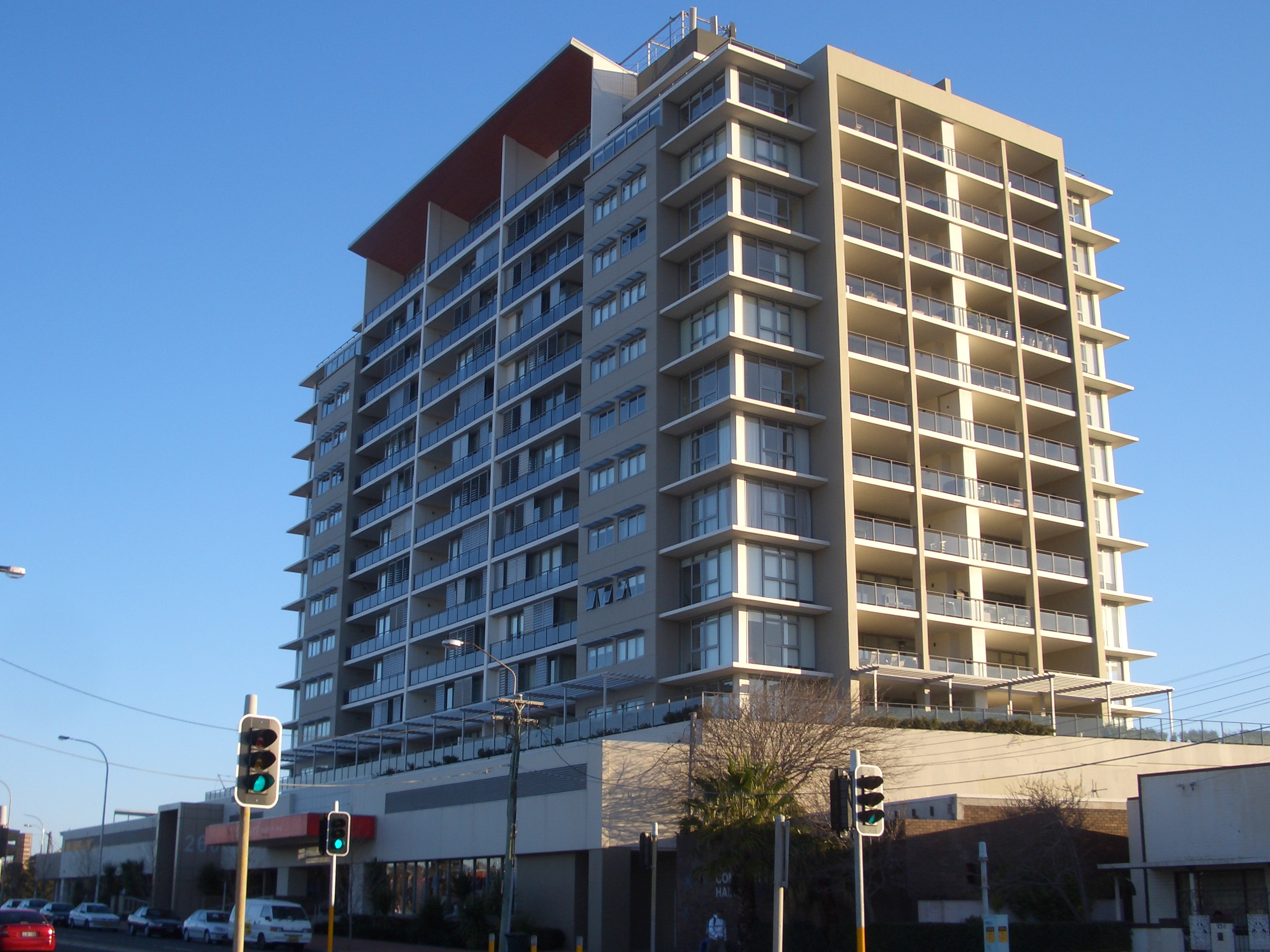
- Southpoint Shopping Centre on Bunnerong Road
- Location: Hillsdale, New South Wales
- Coordinates: 33°57′06″S 151°13′51″E
- Address: 238-262 Bunnerong Rd, Hillsdale NSW 2036
- Opened: 1960; 66 years ago (Hillsdale Town Centre); 1980; 46 years ago (Southpoint Shopping Centre)
- Manager: Rook Partners
- Num. of stores: 30
- Num. of anchor tenants: 3
- Floor area: 12,000 m^{2} (129,167 sq ft)
- Floors: 3
- Parking: 423 spaces
- Website: www.southpointshoppingcentre.com.au

Southpoint Shopping Centre (formerly known as Hillsdale Plaza) is a shopping centre in the suburb of Hillsdale in the Eastern Suburbs of Sydney, Australia, south-east of the CBD.

== Transport ==
Southpoint Shopping Centre has Transdev John Holland bus connections to the Sydney CBD and Eastern Suburbs, as well as local surrounding suburbs. The majority of its bus services are located on Bunnerong Road outside the centre. There is no railway station at Hillsdale; the nearest station is located at Mascot.

Southpoint Shopping Centre also has a multi level car park with 423 spaces.

== History ==
Hillsdale Plaza opened in 1962, as an open air shopping plaza featuring a Woolworths Food Fair supermarket, Benjamins Department Store, a ten pin bowling alley and 40 specialty stores.

In 1980, the centre was renamed Southpoint Shopping Centre, coinciding with a substantial redevelopment which opened in stages between 1980 and 1982, featuring Franklins, Fosseys, Woolworths, Nock and Kirby and 31 other stores.

In 2001, Franklins was closed as part of a wider range of store closures. It was replaced by BI-LO, which operated until the shopping centre's redevelopment in 2003.

In 2003, Southpoint Shopping Centre was demolished apart from Woolworths and four stores that continued to trade during the $55 million redevelopment.

Southpoint Shopping Centre reopened in 2004 as part of a mixed-use development containing 110 apartments on 12 floors. The centre featured Trade Secret, Coles, Woolworths and around 25 stores.

The Coles tenancy was originally planned to be occupied by former tenant BI-LO, but parent company Coles had decided to begin phasing out the BI-LO brand during construction.

Coles which operated until its closure on 21 September 2016.

It was replaced by Aldi which opened in 2017, and Chemist Warehouse which opened in 2018.

In April 2017, Trade Secret was rebranded to TK Maxx.

== Tenants ==
Southpoint Shopping Centre has 12,000m² of floor space. The major retailers include TK Maxx, Aldi, Chemist Warehouse and Woolworths.
