= Eastgardens =

- Suburb
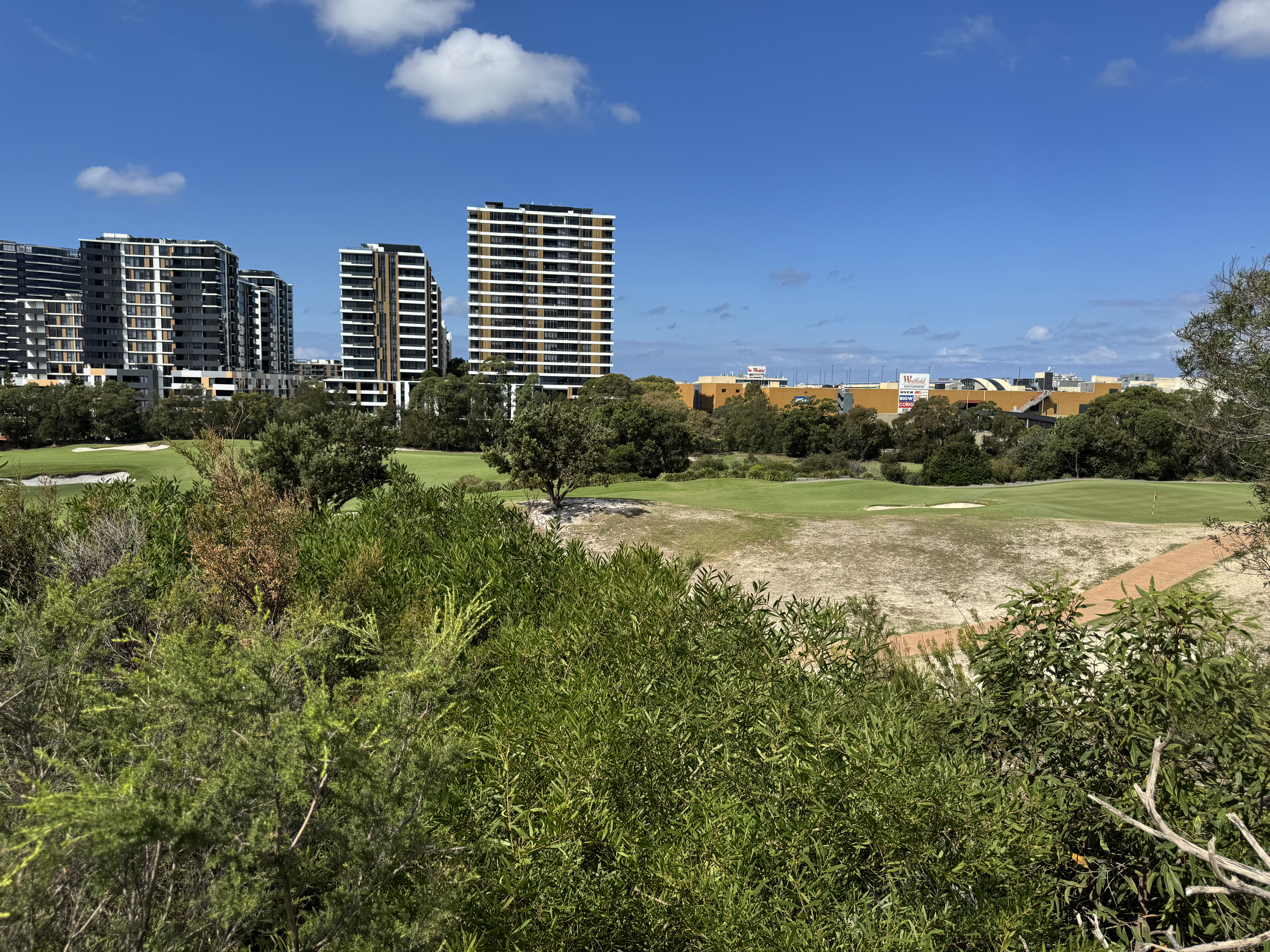
- Eastgardens, view from Mutch Park

- Interactive map of Eastgardens
- Coordinates: 33°56′46″S 151°13′30″E
- Country: Australia
- State: New South Wales
- City: Sydney
- LGA: Bayside Council
- Location: 9 km (5.6 mi) from Sydney CBD

Government
  - State electorate: Maroubra
  - Federal division: Kingsford Smith

Area
  - Total: 0.5 km^{2} (0.19 sq mi)

Population
  - Total: 4,086 (2021 census)
  - Density: 8,172/km^{2} (21,170/sq mi)
- Postcode: 2036
Suburbs around Eastgardens
Eastlakes	Daceyville	Kingsford
Pagewood	Eastgardens	Maroubra
Banksmeadow	Hillsdale	Maroubra

Eastgardens is a suburb in the Eastern Suburbs of Sydney, in the state of New South Wales, Australia. Eastgardens is located 9 km south of the Sydney central business district and is part of the Bayside Council.

It has a large shopping centre, Westfield Eastgardens at the corner of Wentworth Avenue and Bunnerong Road.

== History ==
Eastgardens was originally a part of the suburbs of Pagewood and Hillsdale. The suburb took its name from the Westfield Eastgardens shopping centre in Wentworth Avenue which opened in 1987. The site was originally government owned land which was used as an Urban Transit Authority bus depot and also as a Holden car manufacturing plant.

== Population ==
In the 2021 Census, there were 4,086 people in Eastgardens. 38.0% of people were born in Australia and 45.3% of people spoke only English at home. The most common responses for religious affiliation were No Religion (35.6%) and Catholic (30.0%).
