= Hillsdale, New South Wales =

Hillsdale
- Suburb
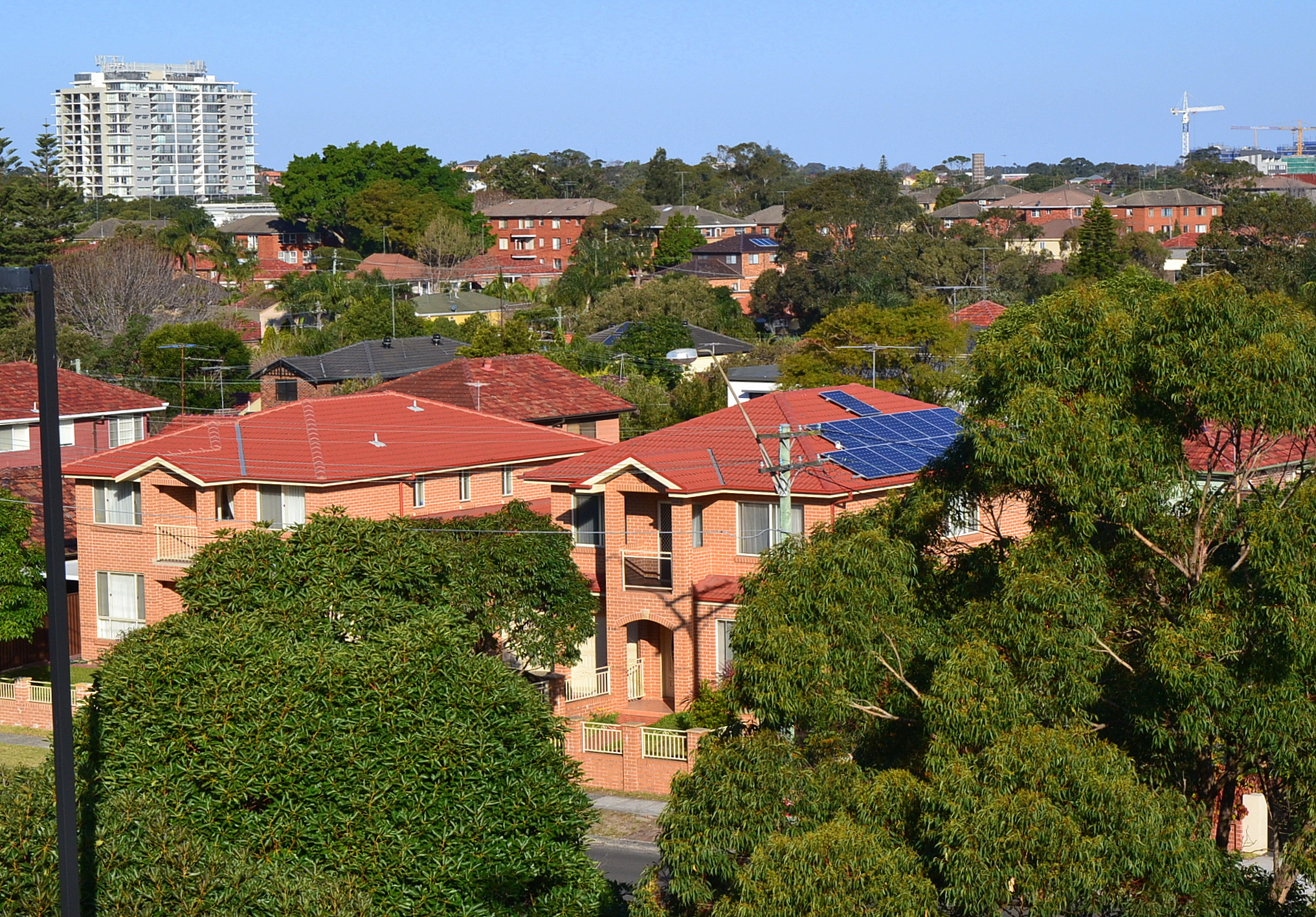
- View of Hillsdale from Eastgardens Shopping Centre

- Interactive map of Hillsdale
- Country: Australia
- State: New South Wales
- City: Sydney
- LGA: Bayside Council
- Location: 6 km (3.7 mi) south-east of Sydney CBD

Government
  - State electorate: Maroubra
  - Federal division: Kingsford Smith

Area
  - Total: 0.7 km^{2} (0.27 sq mi)

Population
  - Total: 5,647 (2021 census)
  - Density: 8,100/km^{2} (20,900/sq mi)
- Postcode: 2036
Suburbs around Hillsdale
Pagewood	Eastgardens	Maroubra
Banksmeadow	Hillsdale	Maroubra
Banksmeadow	Matraville	Matraville

Hillsdale is a suburb in the Eastern Suburbs of Sydney, in the state of New South Wales, Australia. Hillsdale is located 6 kilometres south-east of the Sydney central business district in the Bayside Council. The suburb is named after Pat Hills, former Deputy Premier of New South Wales.

== Retail ==
Hillsdale has a shopping centre called Southpoint Shopping Centre (formerly known as Hillsdale Town Centre) on Bunnerong Road, which is a high-rise mixed-use complex with commercial and residential space and is opposite the large Heffron Park. Southpoint is anchored by TK Maxx, Aldi, Woolworths and a large Australia Post office.

== Recreation ==
Heffron Park, at 44 hectares it is the largest sporting reserve in Randwick City. A range of sports are played in the park through winter and summer including netball, rugby league, soccer, touch football, oz tag, cricket, cycling, tennis and gymnastics. Located on the south-east corner of the park is the Des Renford Leisure Centre, a council-owned gym, aquatic and fitness centre.

The park is popular with local residents for walking, jogging and cycling. The Hensley Athletic Field is located on Wentworth Avenue, close to Botany and the Westfield Eastgardens shopping centre. Matraville Public School is located in Hillsdale at the corner of Bunnerong and Beauchamp Roads.

== History ==
Hillsdale was part of the suburb of Matraville until the 1960s. Matraville was originally reserved for the Church and Schools Corporation with income generated intended to support clergy and teachers. It reverted to the crown in 1917 and was allocated for a settlement for soldiers returning from World War I. The suburb was split between Randwick and Botany Councils. When problems arose from the division in 1961, Botany Council decided to rename its portion Gilmore, to honour Australian poet Dame Mary Gilmore (1864–1962). After the post masters general office pointed out that there already was a Gilmore, New South Wales, the council chose Hillsdale to honour Patrick Darcy Hills, who was the New South Wales minister for local government. It was a controversial choice since most residents believed that a name should have been chosen that reflected Australia's history.

Many homes were built in Hillsdale after World War II including some by the Housing Commission.

== Demographics ==
At the 2021 census, there were 5,647 residents in Hillsdale. The most common country of birth was Australia (43.3%), with the top other countries of birth being Bangladesh 3.7%, China 3.4%, Philippines 3.3%, Brazil 3.2% and Ireland 3.0%. 46.2% of people spoke only English at home. Other languages spoken at home included Bengali 5.2%, Spanish 4.5%, Portuguese 3.8%, Assyrian Neo-Aramaic 3.4% and Cantonese 3.1%. The top responses for religious affiliation were Catholic 29.9%, No Religion 26.6%, Islam 8.5%, Not stated 6.8% and Anglican 5.0%. The majority of dwellings were units or apartments and there were few separate or semi-detached houses in the suburb.

== Education ==
Matraville Public School is a primary school in Hillsdale, drawing its students predominantly from the surrounding suburbs of Hillsdale, Banksmeadow and Matraville. In 2007 the school had approximately 300 students from kindergarten to Year 6. The school opened as Cross Road Public School in 1903, named after the school's location at the intersection between Beauchamp and Bunnerong Roads. It was renamed as Matraville Public School in 1904.

== Housing ==
Housing in Hillsdale is primarily units or flats, with few detached dwellings. More than half the households in Hillsdale rent, significantly higher than the Sydney average.

About 2% of Hillsdale is public housing

== Transport ==
There are about 4 bus stops in the suburb of Hillsdale. The nearest train station is the Domestic Airport railway station in Mascot and it is 5 km from Hillsdale. The nearest light rail stop the Juniors Kingsford light rail stop in Kingsford and it is about 3.3 km from Hillsdale.

== Gallery ==
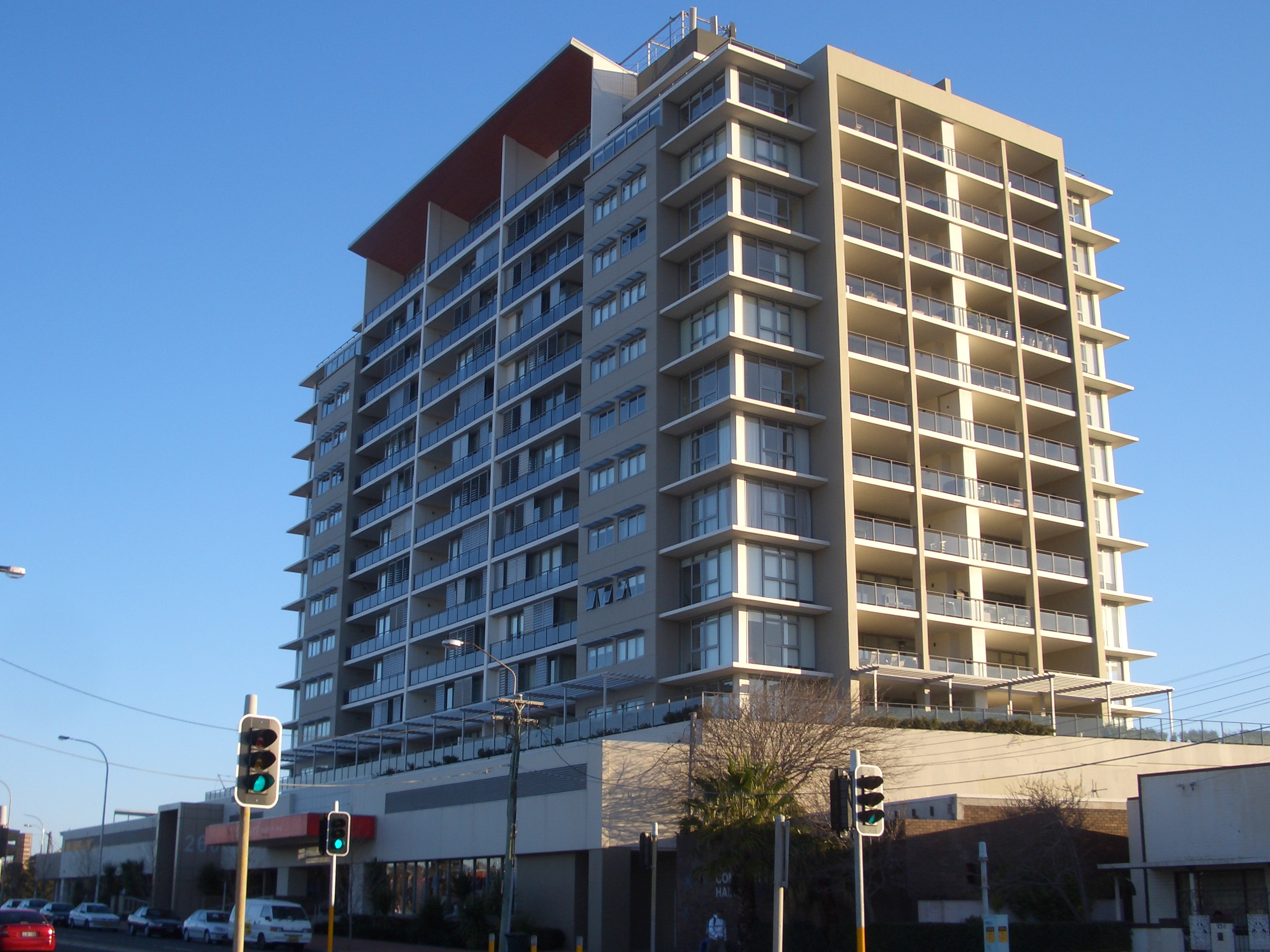
Southpoint Shopping Centre, Bunnerong Road

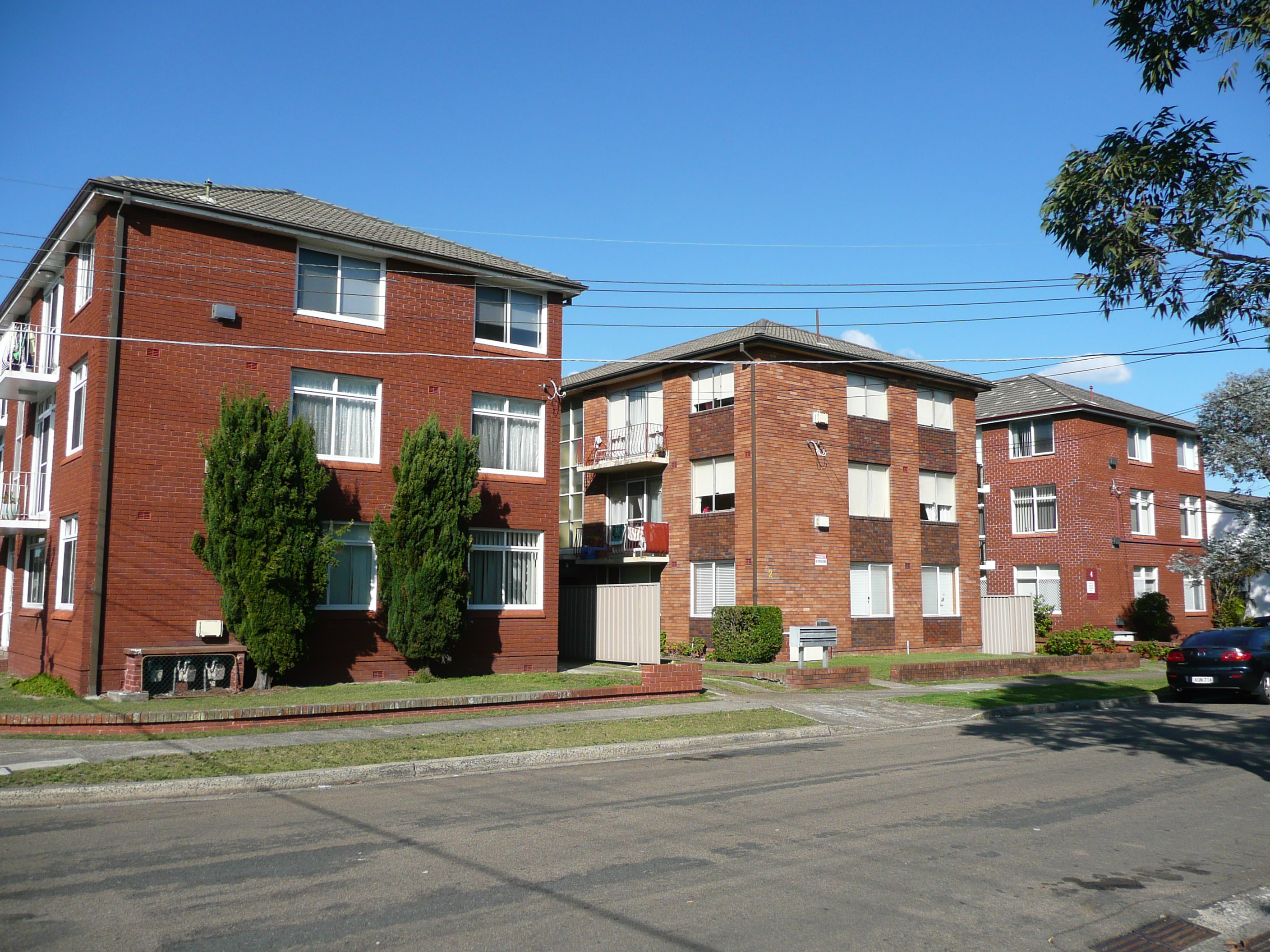
Characteristic three-storey blocks of home units, Unsted Crescent

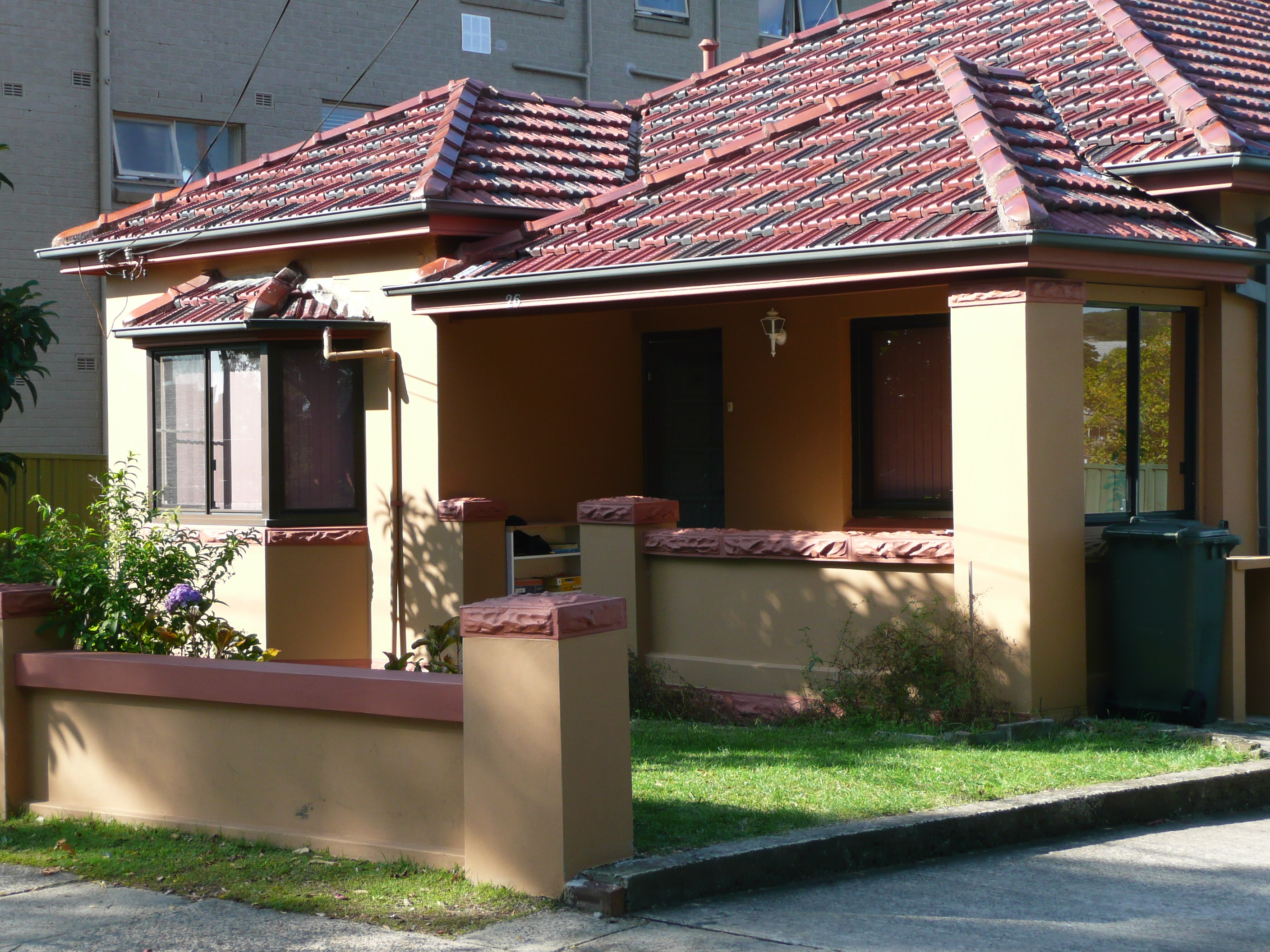
Characteristic detached cottage, Rhodes Street
