= Westfield Eastgardens =

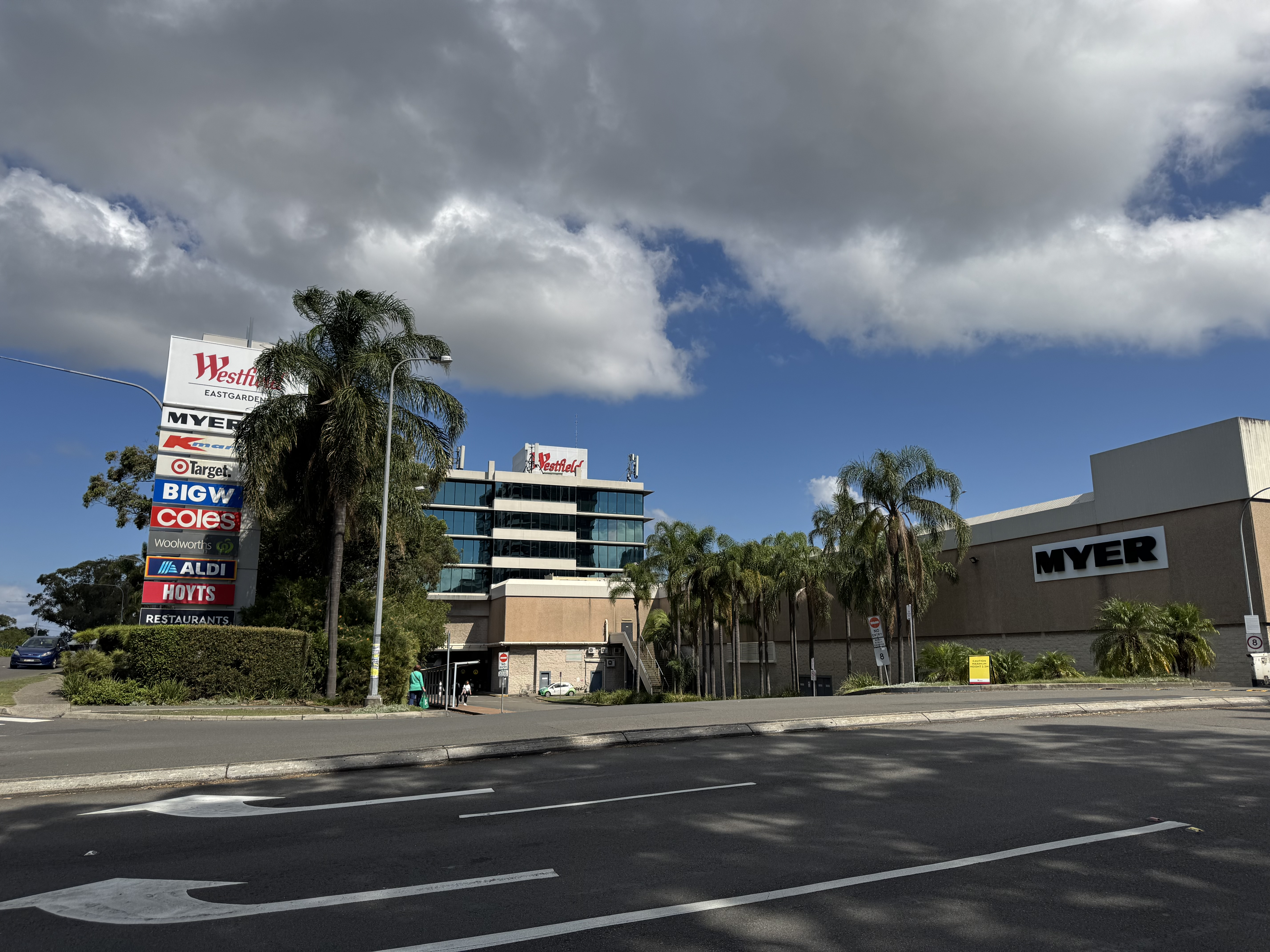
- Westfield Eastgardens
- Location: Eastgardens, New South Wales, Australia
- Coordinates: 33.94468056°S 151.2243639°E
- Address: 152 Bunnerong Road
- Opened: 19 October 1987; 39 years ago
- Developer: Westfield Group
- Manager: Scentre Group
- Owner: Scentre Group (50%); Terrace Tower Group (50%)
- Num. of stores: 280
- Num. of anchor tenants: 8
- Floor area: 82,687 m^{2} (890,035 sq ft)
- Floors: 3
- Parking: 3,148 spaces
- Website: www.westfield.com.au/eastgardens/

Westfield Eastgardens is a large shopping centre in the suburb of Eastgardens in the Eastern Suburbs of Sydney.

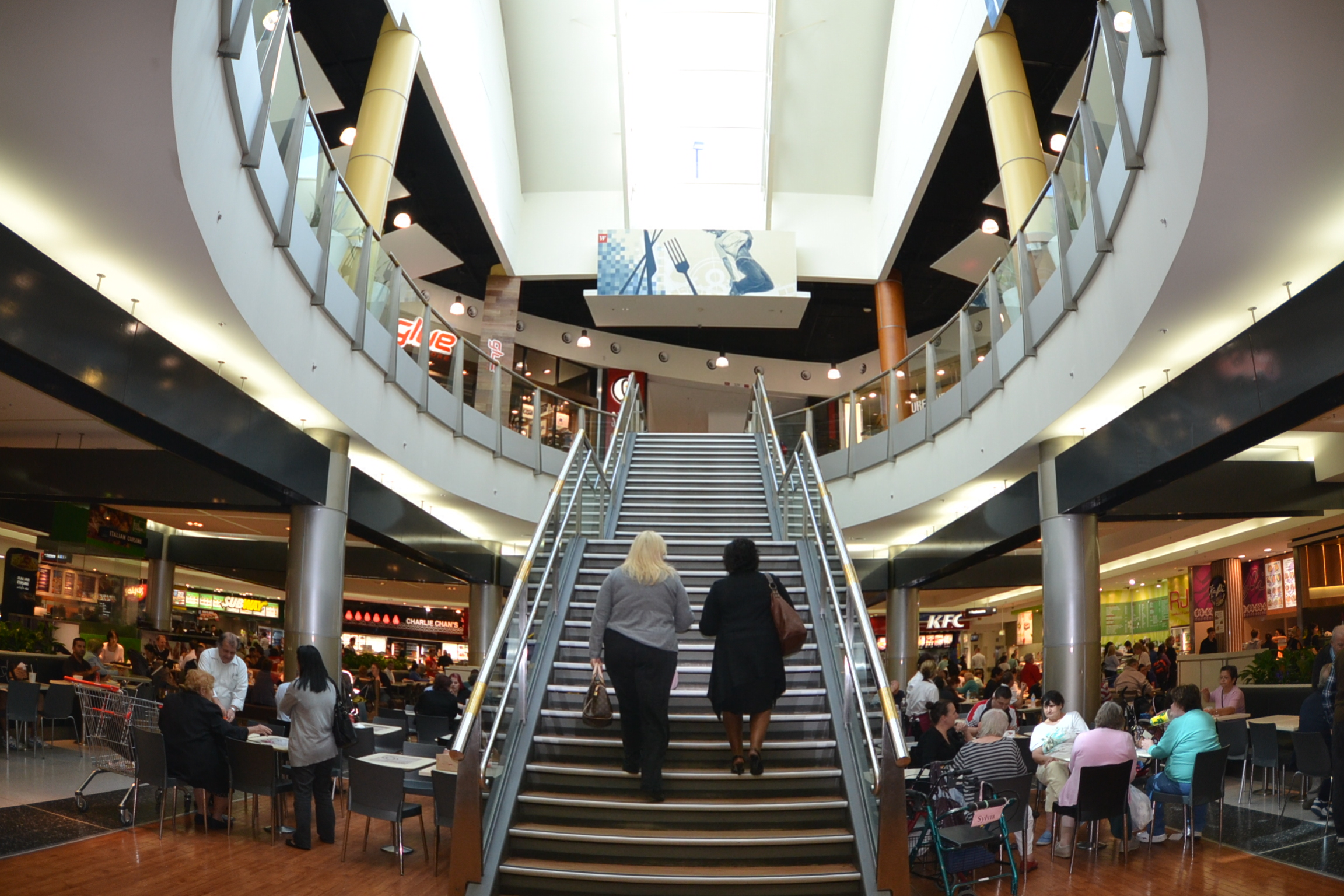
Food court level and looking up to level 2

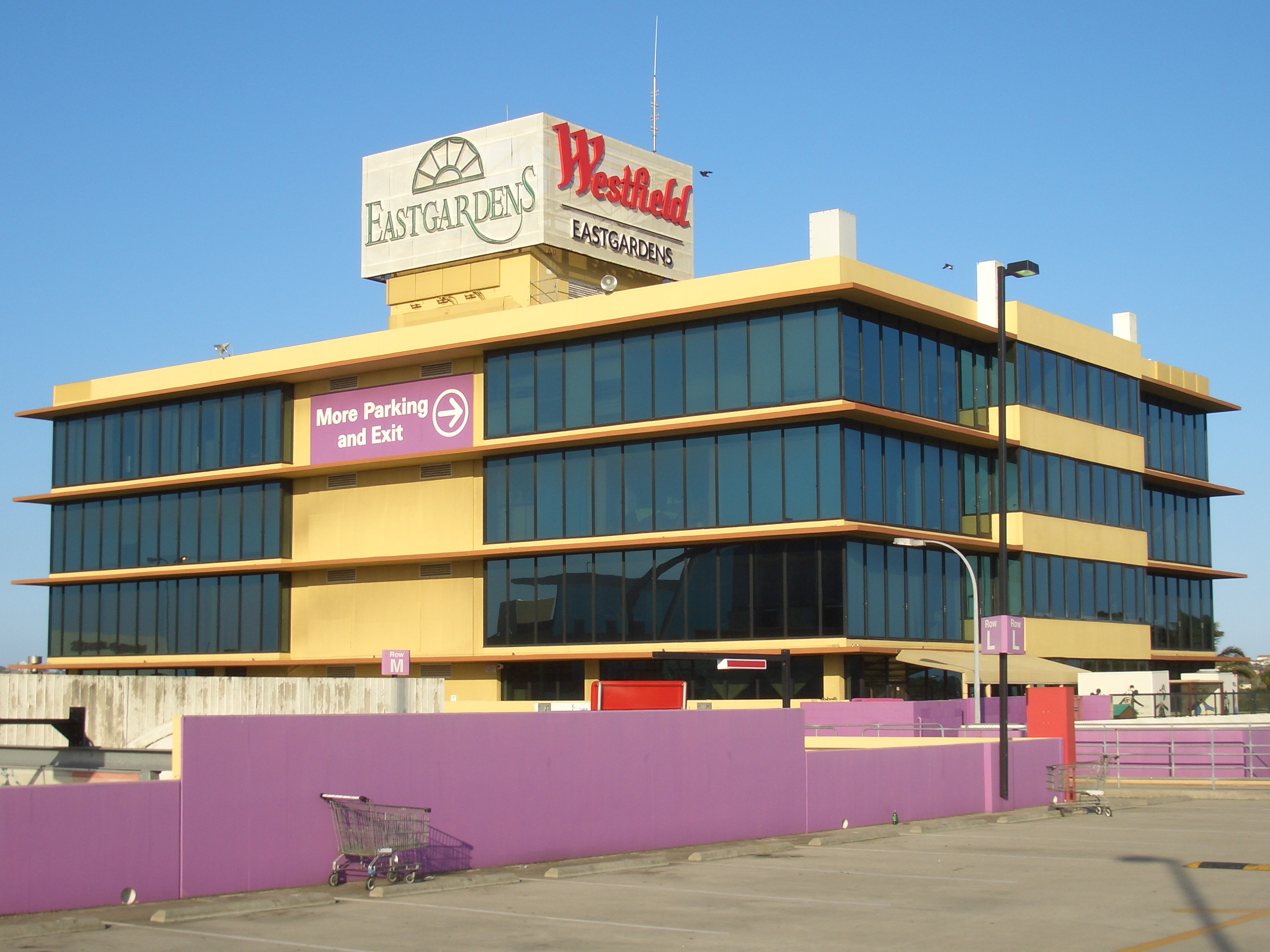
Office tower

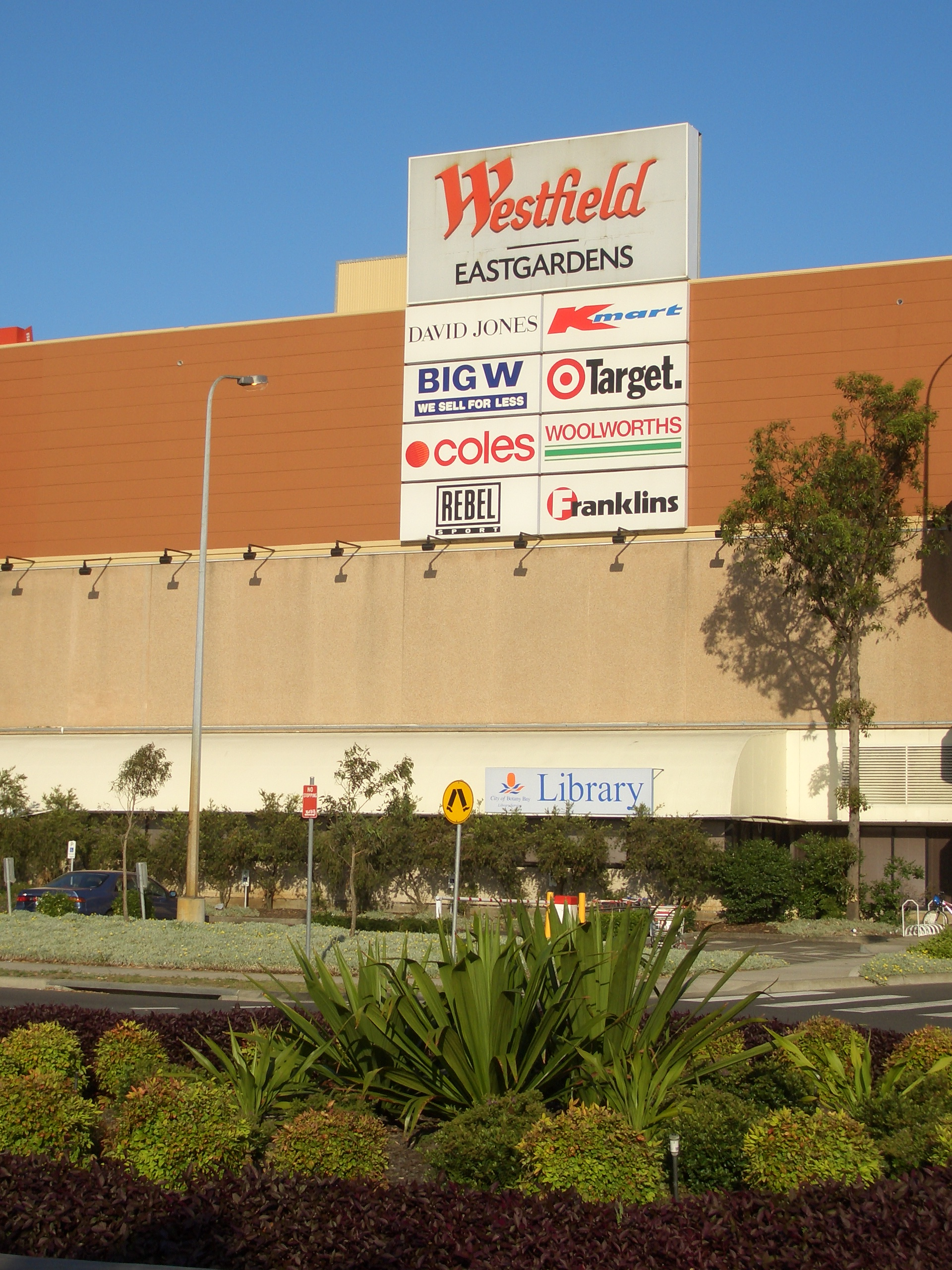
Old signage of the stores with David Jones replaced by Myer in 2008 and Franklins replaced by Romeo's Supa IGA in 2013 which was replaced by Aldi in 2015

== Transport ==
Westfield Eastgardens has bus connections to the Sydney CBD, Eastern Suburbs, as well as local surrounding suburbs. All services are operated by Transdev John Holland except the 301 which is operated by U-Go Mobility. Bus services operate from a bus interchange at the Bunnerong Road end of the shopping centre.

Westfield Eastgardens also has multi level car park with 3,148 spaces.

== History ==
Westfield Eastgardens was built on the site of the former Urban Transit Authority Pagewood bus depot. The depot closed in 1982 and was soon followed by the nearby Holden and WD & HO Wills factories. In order to save jobs, the Government of New South Wales persuaded the Westfield Group to develop the site. The Government rezoned the site and added crown land in order to convince Westfield. In July 1982, three other commercial landlords whose own trade would be affected by the new shopping centre made a challenge to the Land & Environment Court. Following this the Government passed legislation that disallowed an appeal to be made to the Land & Environment Court. Significant public debate followed about the right of the New South Wales Government to overrule the legal process.

Westfield Eastgardens opened on 19 October 1987 and was the largest shopping centre in Australia for a short period until Chadstone Shopping Centre in Melbourne was redeveloped. When the centre opened, it had David Jones, Super Kmart, Target, Franklins, a 6-screen Hoyts cinema as well as 150 other retailers. The Super Kmart hypermarket combined a discount department store (Kmart) and supermarket (Coles)

Since its opening in 1987, the centre has been blamed for a downturn in trade in nearby Maroubra Junction as it was the main retail centre for the area since the opening of Stockland Mall Maroubra in 1981.

In 2002, the centre was redeveloped and third level was added and featured a new Woolworths supermarket, Big W opened and the total amount of retailers rose to 290 with parking for 3,260 cars and the upgrade of Hoyts. When the redevelopment completed, Westfield Eastgardens was the first shopping centre in New South Wales to house three discount department stores, Kmart, Target and Big W.

On 23 September 2007, David Jones closed its store after 20 years of trade due to its proximity to the company's Westfield Bondi Junction and Elizabeth Street/Market Street stores. Myer took over David Jones' space after an extensive refurbishment and opened on 8 March 2008. The opening of the store had marked the return of Myer-Grace Bros to southeastern Sydney since the closure of GoodBuys Clearance in Maroubra in 2002. This swap is similar to Bankstown Central and Westfield Burwood but in an opposite direction (David Jones replacing Myer).

On 24 July 2012, Westfield Eastgardens suffered significant damage when part of the car park collapsed at around 07:00am. Around 500 people were evacuated from the building when a second-level steel beam that supported the car park roof broke. The entire shopping centre was closed off after a survey found the collapse may have caused structural damage in other areas of the building. The dislodgement of the beam caused a partial roof collapse near the food court entrance on the second level, bringing down a plant room, air conditioning units, a cool room, toilet facilities, exhaust fans and an electrical switchboard. Police set up an exclusion zone around the centre and redirected road traffic. The building was closed pending further investigation. The building reopened the following day for retail trade, although some areas in the food court remained closed. Repairs were underway to restore the collapsed sections of the building.

In July 2013, Franklins was rebranded to Romeo's Supa IGA which operated until its closure in March 2015. The space vacated by IGA was taken over by Aldi which opened on 19 August 2015.

On 23 November 2013, a new dining precinct opened which included six new restaurants and was the final stage of the $45 million redevelopment following the centre's revitalised fashion and ambience offering which opened in June.

In July 2018, Scentre Group acquired 50% stake of Westfield Eastgardens from Terrace Tower Group for $720 million.

== Future ==
- On 6 June 2014, Westfield lodged a development application to redevelop Westfield Eastgardens. The $25 million proposal included a new supermarket, mini majors and a new mall featuring 11 stores taking up the car spaces on level 3, outside the current Woolworths exit.
- Since Scentre Group acquired 50% stake of Westfield Eastgardens from Terrace Tower Group. There had been plans to redevelop the centre which would include more local and international fashion retailers and expanding the mall's dining, entertainment and lifestyle offerings. Scentre Group also mixed‐use development including commercial, accommodation and education facilities.
- In June 2020, Scentre Group lodged a proposal to the NSW Government to approve plans for three high-rise towers containing a hotel and student accommodation.

== Tenants ==
Westfield Eastgardens has 84,627m² of floor space. The major retailers include Aldi, Big W, Coles, Cotton On, Hoyts, JB Hi-Fi, Kmart, Myer, Rebel, Target and Woolworths.

== Incidents ==
- On 23 December 2002, a man ran away after being questioned by two police officers on the second floor. The man ran down the escalator which then led to a pursuit. When the man arrived at the first floor he pushed away bystanders and jumped to his death.
- On 10 December 2015, a carjacking occurred while the 59 year old man was sitting in the passenger seat of the parked car waiting for a relative to return. An unknown man entered the driver's side of the car and started the engine driving through the car park. When the vehicle stopped behind traffic, the man told the passenger to get out of the car. Once the passenger left the car the unknown man kept driving through the car park, before hitting a parked unattended car, and then driving from the scene along Banks Avenue.
- On 11 December 2019, another carjacking incident occurred when a 52-year-old woman was leaving Westfield Eastgardens just before 5pm. As she was starting the car, a man jumped into the front passenger seat and threatened her with a device she believed may have been a stun gun. The man instructed the woman to drive, but she jumped out of the car and was helped by members of the public. The man sped off in the Porsche which was worth around $70,000. Police attended the scene and discovered the woman's mobile phone was still in her stolen car, and used its signal to track the vehicle to Wentworth Avenue in the nearby suburb of Eastlakes. When highway patrol officers arrived, they located and arrested a 42-year-old man coming out of the bushes. The man was charged with aggravated taking of a motor vehicle with a person inside, as well as driving during a disqualification period.
