= Banksmeadow =

- Suburb
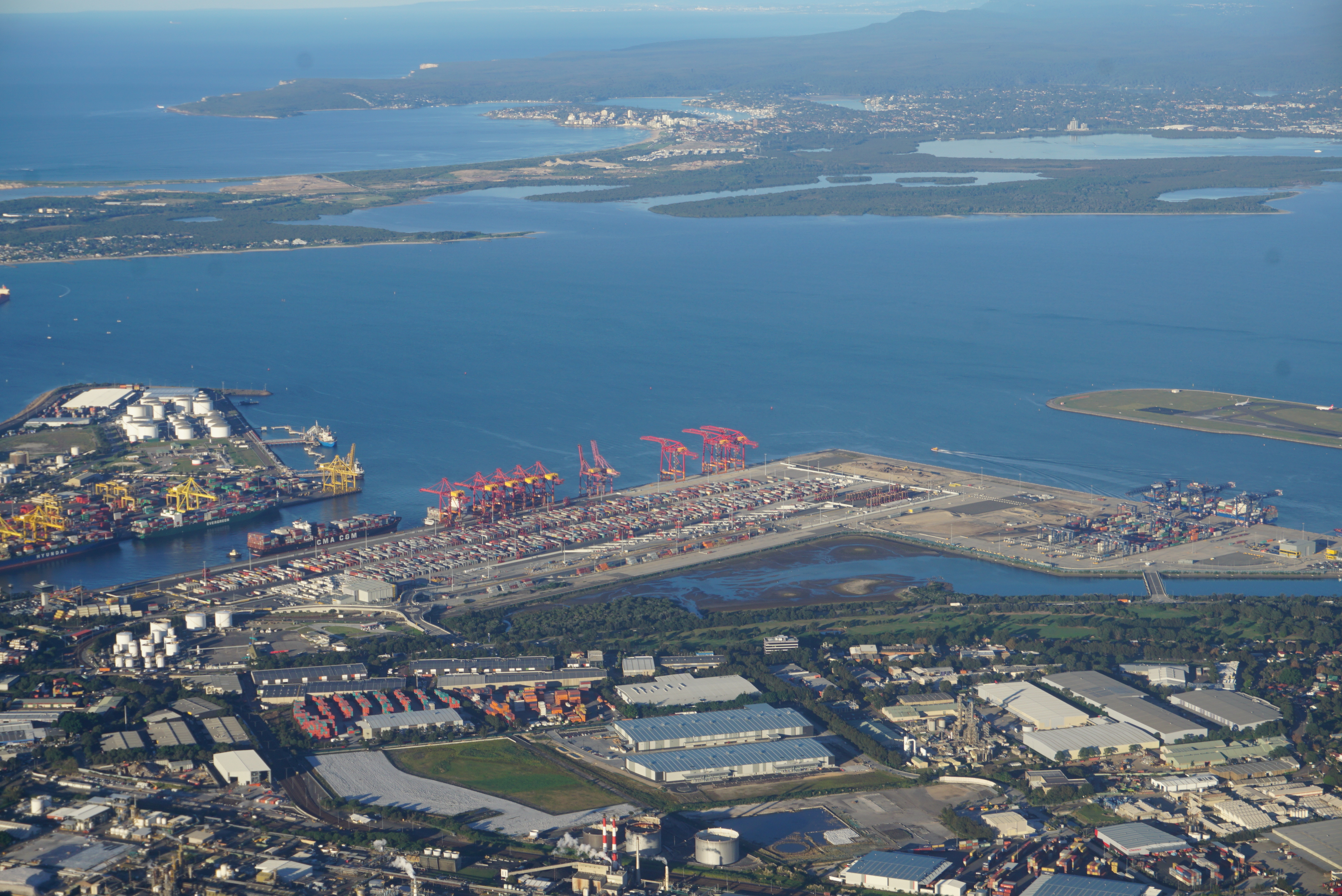
- Part of the Port Botany

- Interactive map of Banksmeadow
- Country: Australia
- State: New South Wales
- City: Sydney
- LGA: Bayside Council
- Location: 11 km (6.8 mi) south of Sydney CBD

Government
  - State electorate: Maroubra
  - Federal division: Kingsford Smith

Area
  - Total: 3 km^{2} (1.2 sq mi)
- Elevation: 5 m (16 ft)

Population
  - Total: 508 (2021 census)
  - Density: 161/km^{2} (420/sq mi)
- Postcode: 2019
Suburbs around Banksmeadow
Botany	Pagewood	Eastgardens
Botany	Banksmeadow	Hillsdale
Sydney Airport	Port Botany	Matraville

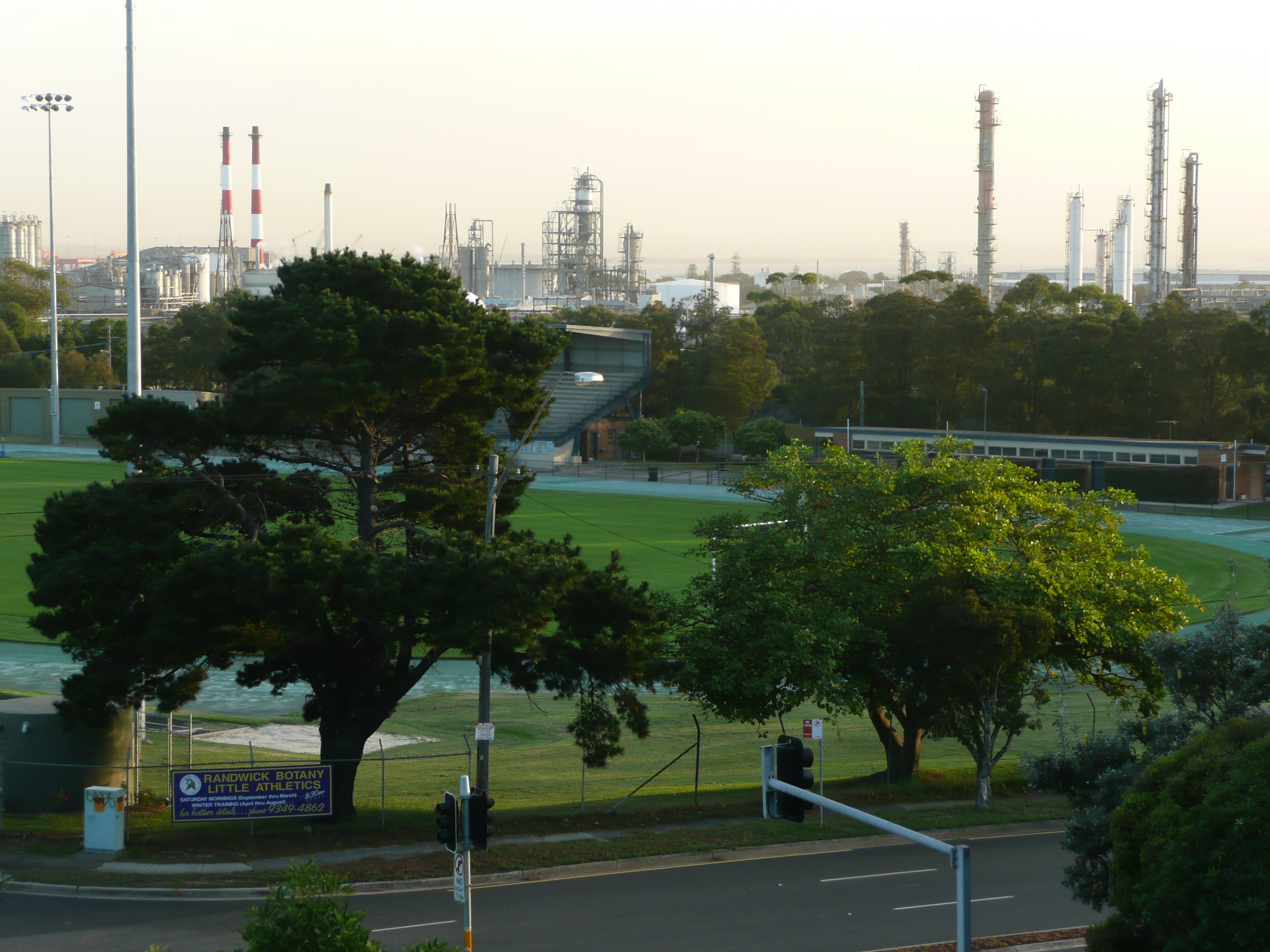
View of Banksmeadow from Eastgardens Shopping Centre, with Botany Athletic Centre in the foreground

Banksmeadow is a suburb located in the Eastern Suburbs of Sydney, within the state of New South Wales, Australia. Situated 11 kilometres south of the Sydney central business district, it falls under the jurisdiction of the Bayside Council. Banksmeadow is positioned on the northern shores of Botany Bay.

== History ==
The naming of Banksmeadow (formerly “Banks Meadow”) pays tribute to the naturalist Sir Joseph Banks, who journeyed to Australia alongside Captain James Cook in 1770. Their initial landfall occurred at Botany Bay on April 29, 1770, during their navigation around Australia aboard the Endeavour. In the early 1970s, extensive land reclamation took place in Botany Bay, resulting in the creation of a foreshore beach, a golf course, and the substantial container port facilities of Patricks and Hutchison.

== Land use ==
Banksmeadow is primarily an industrial area and lacks residential land. Its landscape is dominated by commercial and industrial establishments closely tied to nearby Port Botany, which includes various oil terminals, the Sydenham-Botany Goods Railway, and a substantial chemical facility operated by Orica Limited. Banksmeadow is also home to a Kelloggs factory.

== Landmarks ==
The Foreshore Beach, also known as Botany Beach, stretches along the coastline of Botany Bay. However, the expansion of port facilities by the Sydney Ports Corporation has led to the loss of a portion of the sandy public beach in recent years. A rock seawall now spans a significant stretch of the beach, limiting its use as a public beach. The beach suffers from poor water quality and substantial erosion. Efforts are underway by Sydney Ports to build two groynes to safeguard the remaining section of the beach. The area encompasses Banksmeadow Park and the Botany Golf Club.

== Schools ==
The Banksmeadow Public School is situated at the intersection of Wiggins and Trevelyan Streets in Botany. Its establishment dates back to 1881.
