= Kamaygal =

Indigenous Australian clan of people

Kamaygal people
- aka Kameygal, Gamaygal, Botany tribe
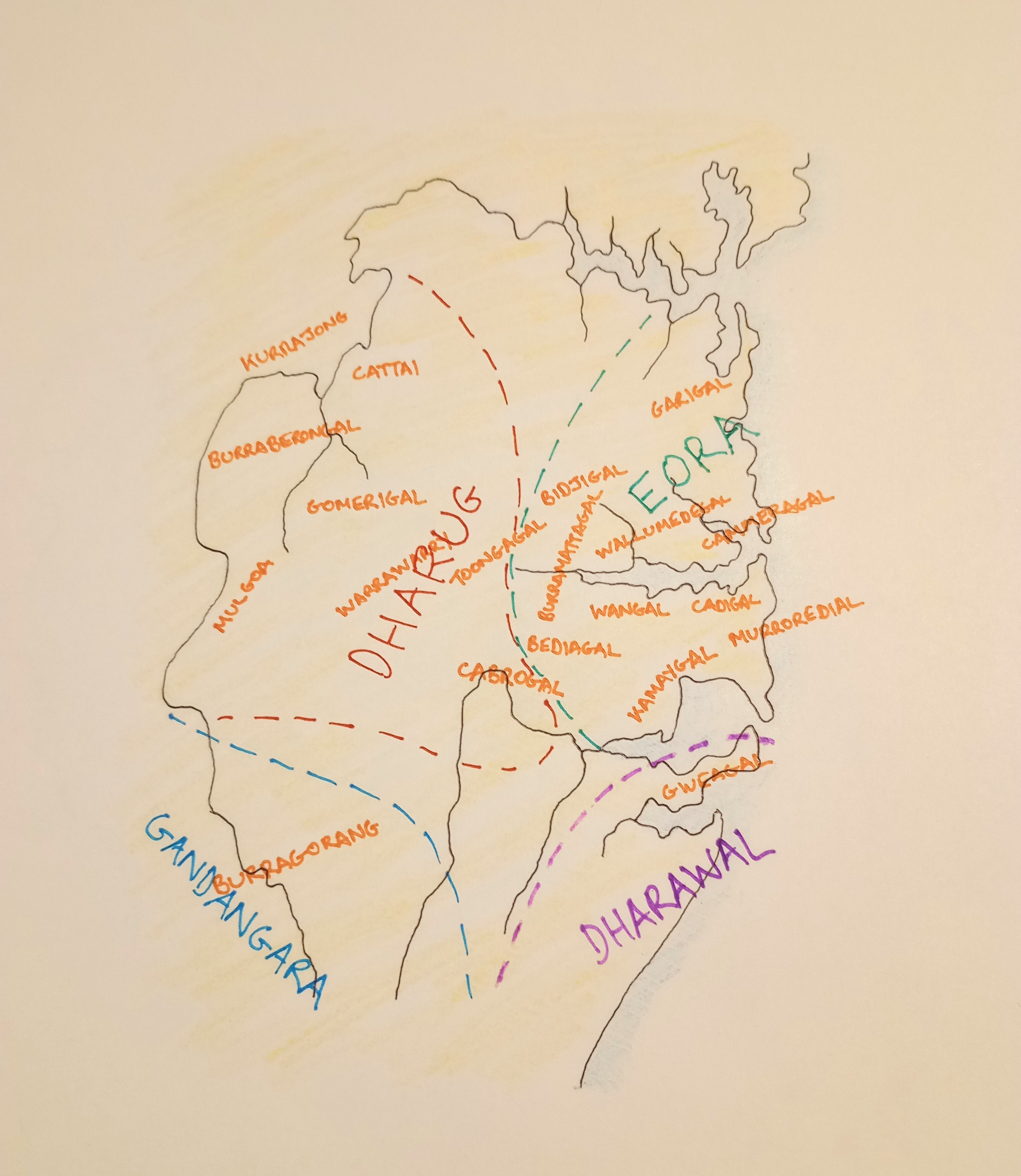
- Indigenous clans of the Sydney region

Hierarchy
- Language family: Pama–Nyungan
- Language branch: Yuin–Kuric
- Language group: Coastal Dharug (Eora)
- Location: Northern shore of Botany Bay, Sydney

Notable individuals
- Mahroot
- Mahroot the Elder

The Kamaygal (also written as Kameygal or Gamaygal) is a term that refers to a clan of Indigenous Australians of the Eora–Dharug nation who inhabited the region consisting of the north shore of Botany Bay in what is now the southern suburbs of the city of Sydney. Descendants of these people continue to live in the region.

== Kamaygal country ==
At the beginning of British colonisation in the late 1780s, the Kamaygal lands included most of the northern shoreline of Botany Bay from the mouth of the Georges River to the sea coast at La Perouse. This area is now dominated by the Sydney Airport, Port Botany and the suburbs of Botany, Brighton-Le-Sands and La Perouse.

The Kamaygal clan's land was bordered on the north by the Cadigal and Murroredial clans, on the west by the Cabragal clan, and on the south by the Gweagal clan.

== Origins of name ==
Their name has two possible origins which could be interconnected. The first is that Kamey is the Eora word for spear and -gal is the suffix indicating people, therefore Kamaygal means "spear people". The second is that Kamay is also the word to describe Botany Bay and Kamaygal means "people of Botany Bay".

== Lifestyle and culture ==
The Kamaygal lived mostly on seafood, possum and fern-root. They were expert at fishing both with line and spear, and built bark canoes called nawi which were operated with hand paddles. Fish were often cooked in the canoe, where a small fire was kept burning on a clay base.

Their total population before the onset of British colonisation seems to have been maintained at around 400 people. They obtained items such as kangaroo skins via trade with neighbouring clans like the Cabragal people to the west. Despite some language difference, the Kamaygal people appear to have had close interactions with the other coastal clans from what is now Wollongong, north to Lake Macquarie.

Initiation ceremonies were conducted on teenage Kamaygal boys and girls as part of their transition to adulthood. Boys had a maxillary central incisor removed and cicatrices placed on their chest, while the girls had the top part of their little finger on the right hand tied off and removed as part of these rituals.

They believed in re-incarnation and a benevolent spirit of life and death named "Boi" who was always above them and would guide them after dying.

== Contact with European explorers ==
When Captain James Cook arrived in the area in 1770 and named Botany Bay, he encountered the Gweagal people on the south side of the bay, who openly resisted Cook and his crew taking claim of their fishing grounds and watering places. The Kamaygal, on the other hand remained aloof from the white-skinned visitors when they came to the north side of Botany Bay, initially thinking that they were "devils" or even large possums as they climbed the masts of the ships.

In early 1788, when Arthur Phillip arrived with the First Fleet, contact with the British became increasingly permanent. However, for the Kamaygal it was the French with whom they first had close experiences. Within days of the First Fleet coming into Botany Bay, a French expedition under Commodore La Perouse set up a temporary camp on Kamaygal country near what is now Frenchman's Beach, where they remained for about 6 weeks. The Kamaygal resented the presence of the French and minor skirmishes occurred.

== Impact of colonisation ==
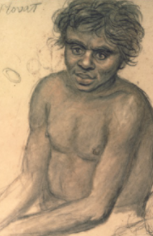
Kamaygal man, Mahroot

In the early years of British colonisation, Botany Bay remained largely the domain of Aboriginal people with the colonisers focusing on occupying the Port Jackson, Parramatta, Hawkesbury and Camden regions. Kamaygal people were therefore able to retain their country, robbing and occasionally killing any white intruders. Resistance leaders such as Bidjigal man Pemulwuy also found refuge on Kamaygal land despite several unsuccessful British punitive expeditions being organised to scour the area.

However, colonisation gradually intruded into Kamaygal life with the dispossession of land, the introduction of alcohol, the taking of women for sexual purposes and subsequent spread of venereal diseases leading to a dramatic decline in population. By the late 1840s, there were only handful of Kamaygal people remaining, centred around Botany.

Individuals who survived, such as Mahroot and Johnny Malone and their families, were able to engage in the British economy by working as fishing guides and sailors. The Old Sir Joseph Banks Hotel which was built at Botany in the 1840s became an important establishment for these survivors, providing access to employment and the hotel grounds also providing land to shelter on and to bury their dead.

== Survival into the modern period ==
In the 1860s and 1870s, the surviving Kamaygal lived together in camps with other Aboriginal people pushed off from their lands in the Sydney and surrounding coastal regions. These camps were at Botany and La Perouse. In the early 1880s, the mixed descendants of the Kamaygal and other Aboriginal people living in the region were forced by the Aborigines Protection Board into an Aboriginal mission and reserve at La Perouse with the aim of segregating them from white Australians. In 1895 a fence was built around the reserve and the residents required government permission to exit the facility.

In 1973 the La Perouse reserve was handed to the NSW Aboriginal Lands Trust, following the abolition of the Aborigines Protection Board. Residents were able to claim ownership and in 1984 the La Perouse Local Aboriginal Land Council was given the deeds to the reserve lands.

== Notable people ==
- Mahroot
- Mahroot the Elder
- Johnny Malone
- William Rowley
- Emma Timbery

== See also ==
- Eora
- Gweagal
