= Paul Chambers (industrialist) =

British civil servant and industrialist

Sir Stanley Paul Chambers
- Born: 2 April 1904; London
- Died: December 1981 (aged 77)
- Education: City of London School; London School of Economics
- Occupation(s): Civil servant, industrialist, Chairman of ICI

Sir Stanley Paul Chambers, KBE, CB, CIE (2 April 1904 – 23 December 1981) was a British civil servant and industrialist and Chairman of ICI.

He was born in London and educated at the City of London School before going to study economics at the London School of Economics.

After graduating, he entered the Inland Revenue and in 1934 was appointed Income Tax Advisor to the Government of India. He returned to the UK in 1940 to be director of statistics and intelligence in the Inland Revenue. He was then appointed secretary and a commissioner of the board. One of his major tasks during the war was to devise the new PAYE (Pay as You Earn) employee taxation system in use in the UK today. After the war, he served on the Control Commission for Germany for two and a half years.

In 1948, he succeeded Sir William Coates as financial director of Imperial Chemical Industries (now ICI), one of Britain's largest companies. He became deputy chairman in 1952 and was chairman from 1960 to 1968, the first non-scientist to hold the post. He moved from there to be chairman of Royal Insurance.

He was President of the Royal Statistical Society from 1964 to 1965. The society's Chambers Medal, awarded every three years, is named after him.

He was Pro-Chancellor of the University of Kent from 1971 to 1977.

He married twice and had two children and a stepchild.
