= Mahroot =

Indigenous Australian from Botany Bay (c.1795–1850)

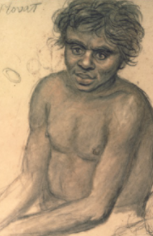
Mahroot (Boatswain Maroot)

Mahroot (c.1795 – 31 January 1850), also known as Boatswain Maroot or Merute, was an Indigenous Australian man of the Gamaygal people from the northern shore of Botany Bay near what is now the city of Sydney. He is known for being a pioneer Indigenous ocean-going sailor and was one of the last speakers of the Kamaygal dialect. Mahroot was also the first Australian Aboriginal person to make a civil case lawsuit, in which he was successful in his claim.

== Early life ==
Mahroot was born around the year 1795 into the Kamaygal clan of the Dharruuk iiwarraa (people) who resided on the north shore of Botany Bay from the mouth of the Cooks River east to what is now known as the Sydney suburb of La Perouse.

His father was known by the name of Maroot the Elder and his mother was called Garang-Garang. He had three sisters. Maroot the Elder was killed in a fight in 1817 and was buried at Rushcutters Bay.

In his early childhood years, Mahroot was one of around 400 Gamaygal people residing along the shores of Botany Bay, living on a traditional diet consisting mostly of fish and bread made from fern-root. However, the influence of British colonisation on the region, which began in 1788, impacted his upbringing and he did not undergo any cultural initiation. The young Mahroot did learn to speak English though, and also became proficient at fishing and handling both native and European-constructed boats.

== Crewman on whaling and sealing ships ==
From around the age of 14, Mahroot joined the crews of various whaling and seal hunting vessels that operated out of Sydney harbour. He later described this work as dirty and hard. From 1809 until the late 1830s, Mahroot crewed on approximately six voyages which went as far as New Zealand, and most of which lasted around a year.

Before going on board a whaling voyage in 1820, Mahroot's portrait was sketched by a visiting Russian artist named Pavel Mikhailov.

== Pioneering civil lawsuit case ==
On his first voyage in 1809, Mahroot was contracted to a vessel owned by the merchant James Underwood, which sailed to Macquarie Island in the Southern Ocean in order to harvest seals. He was abandoned without rations on this island with several other crewmen. For around twelve months they managed to survive, subsisting on seals, penguins and birds for food, before they stowed away on another vessel that was visiting the island. Mahroot eventually was able to return to Sydney in October 1811.

Once home, he petitioned Governor Lachlan Macquarie in a claim against Underwood for breach of contract and non-payment of wages. Mahroot was successful in his petition and Underwood paid him £10 in cash and goods. This represents the first civil case made by an Indigenous Australian.

== Fisherman and leaseholder ==
By the late 1830s, Mahroot had tired of the ocean-going lifestyle, and decided upon living permanently back on his home country on the northern shore of Botany Bay where he could be a fisherman. His close links with his country being shown when he stated that "all this my country, pretty place Botany".

British settlers had not yet taken all the land in this area, and Mahroot with his wife staked a claim to a portion of bayside land. They established two huts and applied to Governor Richard Bourke for a grant on this land. Bourke instead gave Mahroot a lease to 10 acres of land around the huts that he had built. Mahroot, with his wife and sister, made a living fishing Botany Bay and selling their catch to the Sydney Markets. They also rented out their huts and some of their land to Europeans to supplement their income. Despite requests to purchase his own land outright, Mahroot was denied this by the colonial authorities and his tenure remained a temporary leasehold.

Mahroot's leasehold was located near Bunnerong Creek and most of it is now part of the Port Botany logistics sea-freight terminal. The Bunnerong Power Station also occupied his land for a period in the twentieth century.

== Interviewed by the Select Committee on Aborigines ==
In 1845, the colonial government directed a select committee to be formed to gather information on how colonial expansion was affecting Aborigines. Only one Indigenous person was interviewed by the committee and that was Mahroot. Mahroot outlined how in the fifty or so years since white colonists came to his country, his clan had been reduced from around 400 people to only four. The committee documented how the aggressive mode of the colonists taking possession of the land led to a vast loss of life of the native population through violence, neglect and enforced prostitution leading to rampant sexual diseases and infertility. The colonial government did not act on any of the findings of the select committee.

== Fishing guide ==
By the 1840s, the British started to use the area around Mahroot's leasehold as a day-trip destination from Sydney, especially for fishing excursions. The beach-side Sir Joseph Banks Hotel was built in what is now the suburb of Banksmeadow which further enticed a tourist population to flow into the region. Mahroot became a respected fishing guide for these tourists, thereby finding another avenue to earn income.

However, Mahroot's wife died in the late 1840s and it seems he was unable to prevent local settlers from making incursions onto his land. By 1849 he was living in a makeshift hut on the grounds of the Sir Joseph Banks Hotel.

== Death and legacy ==
Mahroot died on-country on 31 January 1850 at the Old Sir Joseph Banks Hotel. He is buried in the garden of the hotel close to the beach, which was a traditional Kamaygal burial ground.

In 2016, a street and a reserve in a new precinct of the suburb of Botany were named after Mahroot.

== See also ==
- List of Indigenous Australian historical figures
