= Botany Post Office =

Historic post office in Sydney, Australia

- Location within Sydney
- 33.9444°S 151.1970°E
- Location: 2 Banksia Street, Botany, Sydney, New South Wales, Australia

Commonwealth Heritage List
- Official name: Botany Post Office
- Type: Listed place (Historic)
- Designated: 8 November 2011
- Reference no.: 106143

Botany Post Office is a heritage-listed post office at 2 Banksia Street, Botany, Sydney, New South Wales, Australia. It was added to the Australian Commonwealth Heritage List on 8 November 2011.

== History ==
An unofficial post office was opened at Botany in 1881, as the area maintained a small population throughout the 1880s. Large scale subdivision and settlement of land eventually occurred in the 1890s, with a town hall built in 1899. At that time, the postal facility was transferred to the new town hall in Botany Road, a little to the south of the current post office building. After World War I, commercial expansion generally took place along Botany Road. About two decades later, the local municipal council lobbied for a new purpose-built post office, and accordingly approached the Postmaster General's Department. A new building was constructed on a site in Banksia Street.

The date of construction for the current building has variously been attributed to 1917 and 1923. If the first date is correct, the Botany Post Office would be one of the earliest designed and constructed by the Commonwealth Department of Works and Railways in New South Wales after assuming that responsibility (the states generally continued to design and build post offices up until 1916). However, given the later date is more likely, the post office would still be one of a series of comparatively early post offices built by the Commonwealth in the state.

Although George Oakeshott was the architect in charge of Commonwealth Department of Works and Railways, the architect who actually designed the building was probably E. J. Henderson who had designed a number of post office buildings.

In May 1939, the post office was robbed by breaking into the strongroom by blasting a gelignite charge, which created three loud explosions. Having obtained access to the safe, the men stole £50 worth of cash, postal notes and stamps, and well as other items in the post office to the value of £260. Although local residents saw the incident, they only watched on as they were too afraid to notify the police. Three men were subsequently arrested, but only one was found guilty and sentenced to 2 years imprisonment and the other two men were acquitted.

== Description ==
Botany Post Office is at 2 Banksia Street, corner Nilsson Lane, Botany, comprising the whole of Lot 1 DP208627. This is the third site of Botany's Post Office, on the northeast corner of Banksia Street and Nilsson Lane, c. 50m east of Botany Road, the main commercial street of the suburb.

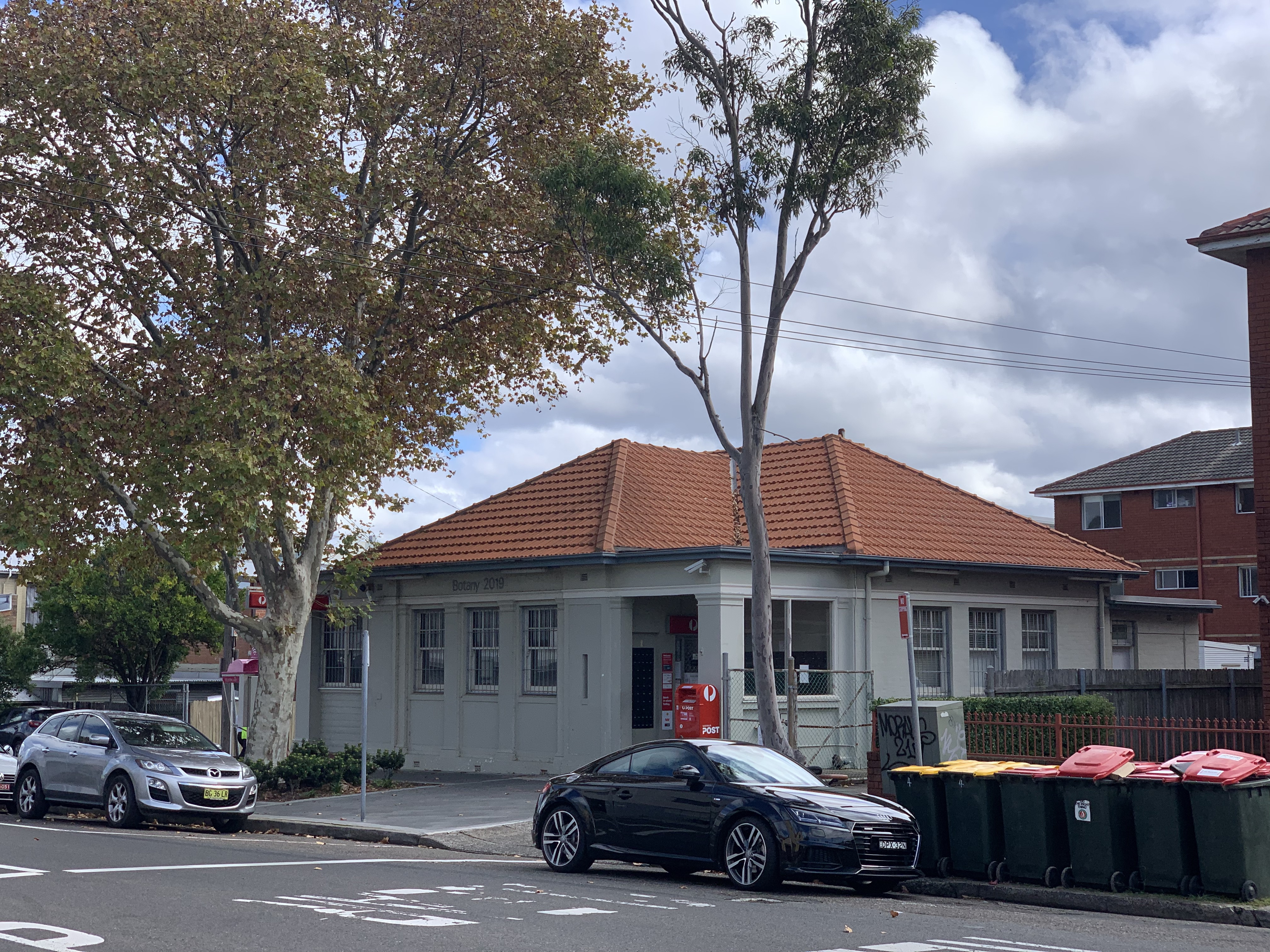
The exterior of Botany Post Office

This building was the first purpose-built post office for Botany, and claimed as the first NSW post office built to Commonwealth architects' designs. Its external detail and finish was broadly Neo-Georgian and Colonial Revival in the manner suggested in William Hardy Wilson's well-known local designs of 1913 (Eryldene) or 1916 (Purulia), with a hipped terracotta roof in Marseilles-pattern tile (probably not original), boxed eaves, double-hung sash windows that have six-paned upper sashes, cement rendered external walls and Tuscan pillars framing the entries and four others flanking the windows of the retail space. The columnar motif in groupings or suggested groupings of four was an established signature in Murdoch and Mackennal's smaller Victorian post offices and was to some extent a carry-over from earlier Murdoch designs in Queensland such as Roma Courthouse. The public area was placed under a hipped breakfront and accessed from porch entries to either side, on the well-established Queensland and Victorian pattern. At some stage since its completion, the southwest porch's entrance has been boarded-in, and incorporated into the retail space. This porch's plaster ceiling finish is extant and visible within the retail space. The design is more like a residential-cottage in scale and demeanour than the monumentalised and usually elevated masonry post offices in Queensland and Victoria. The PO box area is located inside the remaining porch and also in an addition towards the rear of the building.

A concrete driveway was added later to a car park area at the rear. This area was later fenced with galvanised chain link and steel tubing. A small front yard or garden area is in front of the entry side, and this may have been a lawn at some point. It is now brick paved in zigzag patterning, probably dating from the mid-1980s. A set of public phone booths was installed on the left front, along with a concrete framed park bench (later replaced with a lighter metal structure).

Several additions have been made to the rear of the post office. A space now used as a lunchroom between the building's two toilets was probably the rear verandah of the original building, but has now been enclosed by an addition. A low ramp access has been fitted to the northeast porch and a metal frame glazed door has replaced the original doors. The windows have all been barred apart from those to the porch still in use at the northeast corner. The battened board ceiling remains in the retail space, but elsewhere ceilings are of more recent origin. The original lighting in the retail space was replaced with suspended fluorescent units. Ducted reverse-cycle air conditioning has replaced or supplanted the window-mounted units, except in the former mail sorting room at the rear, which retains a wall-mounted air conditioner. The original public space probably had timber and glass partitions in the usual Federal manner, but has largely been opened up into an "office landscape" with screens and linked areas, as in the fused retail and mail room areas, but some lightweight timber and plasterboard partitions remain including one that separates the retail space from the manager's office. The northeast porch has been partially glazed in recent decades. Originally all window framing were dark, presumably polished timber but now are painted in a shade of white, and the remainder of the building is painted in light grey, with some elements including eaves painted in dark grey. The porch roofs are flat, as in the two Bondi Post Offices of this general period.

=== Condition ===
The overall condition is good given the building's age. Alterations and additions have been mainly built at the rear of the post office. The post office is relatively intact to its interior.

Various additions towards the rear of the building, including a mail sorting room and post office box porch in an addition of lightweight timber construction, and minor alterations throughout, all of which are of relatively recent origin.

== Heritage listing ==
Botany Post Office was listed on the Australian Commonwealth Heritage List on 8 November 2011 having satisfied the following criteria.

Criterion A: Processes

Botany Post Office, constructed in 1923, is of significance as one of a series of comparatively early post offices built by the Commonwealth Department of Works and Railways in New South Wales after assuming that responsibility (the states generally continued to design and build post offices up until 1916). The overall level of intactness enhances this value.

Criterion D: Characteristic values

Botany Post Office is an example of:

- post office and telegraph office of second generation typology (1870–1929), not incorporating quarters
- Neo-Georgian/Colonial domestic revival architectural style
- the design work of the Commonwealth Department of Works and Railways with George Oakeshott as architect in charge and EJ Henderson, as the probable design architect.

Botany Post Office is a small post office from the interwar era, associated with the early phase of Commonwealth Government designs in NSW institutional buildings. Typologically, it contained (and retains) a post office and postal functions. It is also comparatively intact externally (save for rear works and additions), and internally.

Architecturally and stylistically, the design is interesting in its determinedly domestic scale and demeanour, and for its marked stylistic and thematic affinity with Hardy Wilson's early institutional buildings. The cottage form and domestic scaling in fact receive a determined expression with this post office, in comparison with the still monumental designs for Queensland and Victoria. It is also testament to the power of Colonial Revivalism and Neo-Georgian as a sensibility in Australian architecture, and occurs comparatively early in post-Federation applications of this mode to small public and commercial buildings. Given the domestic focus in later Sydney architecture the domesticity of smaller institutional designs, such as Botany Post Office, is of considerable interest.

Criterion G: Social value

The post office has been in operation for approximately 90 years, and has provided postal services and facilities to the local community for that period.
