= Botany, New South Wales =

Botany
- Suburb
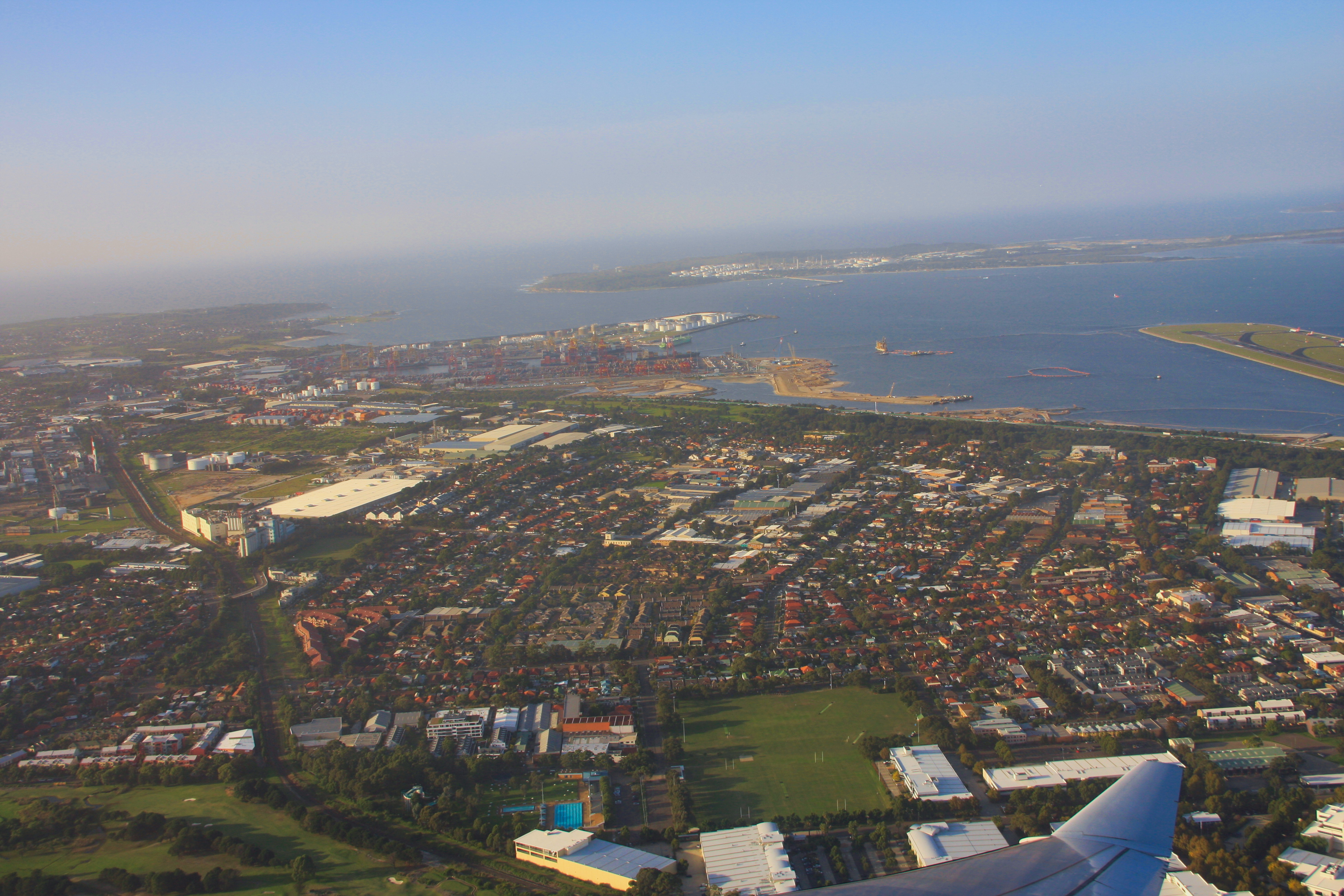
- Aerial view of Botany

- Interactive map of Botany
- Country: Australia
- State: New South Wales
- City: Sydney
- LGA: Bayside Council
- Location: 11 km (6.8 mi) south of Sydney CBD

Government
  - State electorate: Maroubra
  - Federal division: Kingsford Smith

Area
  - Total: 7 km^{2} (2.7 sq mi)
- Elevation: 6 m (20 ft)

Population
  - Total: 12,960 (2021 census)
  - Density: 1,066.6/km^{2} (2,762/sq mi)
- Postcode: 2019
Suburbs around Botany
Sydney Airport	Mascot	Pagewood
Sydney Airport	Botany	Banksmeadow
Botany Bay	Botany Bay	Port Botany

Botany is a suburb in the south of the Eastern Suburbs of Sydney, in the state of New South Wales, Australia. Botany is 11 kilometres south of the Sydney central business district and is part of the Bayside Council.

Botany sits on the northern shore of Botany Bay, east of Sydney Airport, adjacent to the suburbs of Mascot, Banksmeadow, Pagewood and Port Botany.

== History ==
The original inhabitants of the northern reaches of Botany Bay were Kamaygal clan people, who belonged to the Eora-Dharug nation of indigenous Australians. Significantly, they had already been living there since time immemorial when the first European colonists arrived late in the 18th century and are still present today (2026).

Real estate map of Botany, 1907

Botany Bay, to the south, is where Captain James Cook first entered the bay on 29 April 1770, while navigating northwards along the eastern coastline of Australia in his ship, HMS Endeavour. English botanist Joseph Banks and Swedish assistant botanist Daniel Solander, who accompanied Cook, spent several days on shore collecting vast numbers of specimens previously unknown in Europe. Cook's log first referred to the bay as Sting Rays' Harbour, then later Botanist Bay and finally both these names were crossed out and replaced with Botany Bay. In colonial times the name Botany Bay was synonymous with 'penal colony' & was by far the only Australian place name known worldwide.

The Aboriginal dialect name for this part of Botany Bay was Booralee. The suburb of Botany, as one of the earliest settlements on the perimeter of the bay, took its name, but the name 'Booralee' still survives, in particular as the name of a local park. Up until the early 20th century, the territory of Botany extended north, east & west, covering an area very much larger than the present-day boundaries. Nearby Mascot for example was North Botany, while the Rockdale area was West Botany.

Because of the abundant water supply & suitable soil, Botany was originally intended to be an agricultural district, in the same way as nearby areas where market gardens were plentiful. However, early in the piece it became a place made over to noxious trades with slaughter houses, fellmongers' yards & boiling down works. In 1809, Mr E Redmond was one of the first to settle here and Simeon Lord (1771–1840) was an important developer in the area who built a fulling mill in 1815. In 1823 he was granted 600 acres (2.4 km^{2}) and more grants followed. Part of his estate was subdivided in 1859 to create the Booralee Township and the rest was subdivided in 1887.

A significant turnaround in land-use came some 70 years after the establishment of the first European settlement in 1788 when the Sydney Waterworks were established in Botany in 1858. The so called Lachlan swamps, which drained to the Botany foreshore, were used to supply household water to virtually the entire city of Sydney as it was then. Ruins of the old waterworks are still to be seen today (2026), on the edge of the precinct of Sydney Airport.

Noxious trades returned in force to the Botany area late in the 19th century after the closing of the waterworks. Well into the 20th century wool scouring works & tanneries were important industrial activities in the district. The term 'botany wool', which gained currency in the mid-19th century, was used to describe best quality wool, a great deal of which was at the time prepared for export in the Botany area.

Another activity that is now part of the folklore of the area was commercial fishing. For 150 years, from the 1820s to the early 1970s, the Booralee fishing village operated as a local cottage industry in the suburb of Botany. The construction of the airport's north-south runways, along with industrial development and overfishing, led to the decline of the village.

The Sir Joseph Banks Hotel was a popular hotel on the shores of Botany Bay. By 1850, a private zoo had been established there and visitors could go horse riding, play cricket and football. International athletes challenged the locals in the Sir Joseph Banks Handicap on the racetrack. In 1988, the Sir Joseph Banks Pleasure Gardens were refurbished with local industry contributions. The racing track was restored and an annual event called the Botany Bay Gift attracted international athletes again. The hotel, which was built in stages from 1840, is now listed on the Register of the National Estate. The other historic landmark in the area is St Matthew's Church of England, on the corner of Botany Road and Lord Street. It was built in 1862 and is now on the Register of the National Estate.

Until the mid-1940s the Cooks River debouched into Botany Bay at the southern corner of the suburb's present-day footprint. The entire estuary was diverted then to its present-day location at Kyeemagh in order to extend the footprint of Kingsford Smith airport. The airport's north-south runways, which extend into the waters of the bay for some 3 km, were both built post-1965. The Port Botany complex was built post-1975. These infrastructures along with associated main roads have drastically changed the configuration of the northern shore of the historic bay & have detracted considerably from its natural beauty. They are also sources of pollution to land, sea & sky.

=== Former tram line service ===
The city line to Botany opened in 1882 as a steam tramway, with electric services commencing in 1903. The service from Circular Quay initially via Elizabeth, Chalmers and Redfern Streets (from 1902), then in 1933 via Pitt and Castlereagh Streets, and Eddy Avenue, Lee and Regents Streets, to Botany Street in Waterloo. A single-track connection along Bourke and O'Dea Streets joined at the present day Green Square, allowing access to the Dowling Street Depot. The line then passed down the entire length of Botany Road to Botany.

In Mascot, a branch led to the former Ascot Racecourse at the site of Sydney Airport. Points were provided at Bay Street on Botany Road in Botany, for short working. The line was double track throughout. From Botany, a single-track line crossed the Botany Goods railway at Beauchamp Road, then passed along Perry Street and Bunnerong Road, past the former Bunnerong Power Station to join the La Perouse line at Yarra Junction. Generally a shuttle service operated on this single track section between Botany and La Perouse. This single-track line was cut back to Military Road in 1935. The line from the junctions at Cleveland Street to Botany closed in 1960. Transdev John Holland bus route 309 generally follows the route.

== Heritage listings ==
Botany has a number of heritage-listed sites, including:

- 23 Anniversary Street: Old Sir Joseph Banks Hotel
- 2 Banksia Street: Botany Post Office

== Demographics ==
According to the 2021 census of Population, there were 12,960 people in Botany.

- Aboriginal and Torres Strait Islander people made up 1.9% of the population.
- The most common ancestries were Australian 25.7%, English 25.5%, Irish 12.7%, Chinese 8% and Scottish 7.1%.
- 62.9% of people were born in Australia. The next most common countries of birth were England 3.4%, New Zealand 2.4%, China 2.3% and Philippines 2.2%.
- 69.6% of people spoke only English at home. Other languages spoken at home included Mandarin 3.0%, Spanish 2.0%, Greek 1.9%, Indonesian 1.6% and Cantonese 1.4%.
- The most common responses for religion were Catholic 34.2%, No Religion 29.8% and Anglican 8.8%.

== Commercial area ==
The main shopping centre in Botany runs along Botany Road, which qualifies as one of the oldest roads in all of European-settled Australia. It is for example just as old & important as Parramatta Road.

Port Botany is the site of Sydney's major port and as such, Botany is a suburb with extensive commercial development centred on shipping and freight. Botany also has a large chemical production facility owned by several companies including Huntsman and Orica (previously ICI). The plant was built in the 1940s and has been owned by Orica since 1997. The plant once manufactured paints, plastics and industrial chemicals such as solvents, and is responsible for a large groundwater plume of pollution in the area.

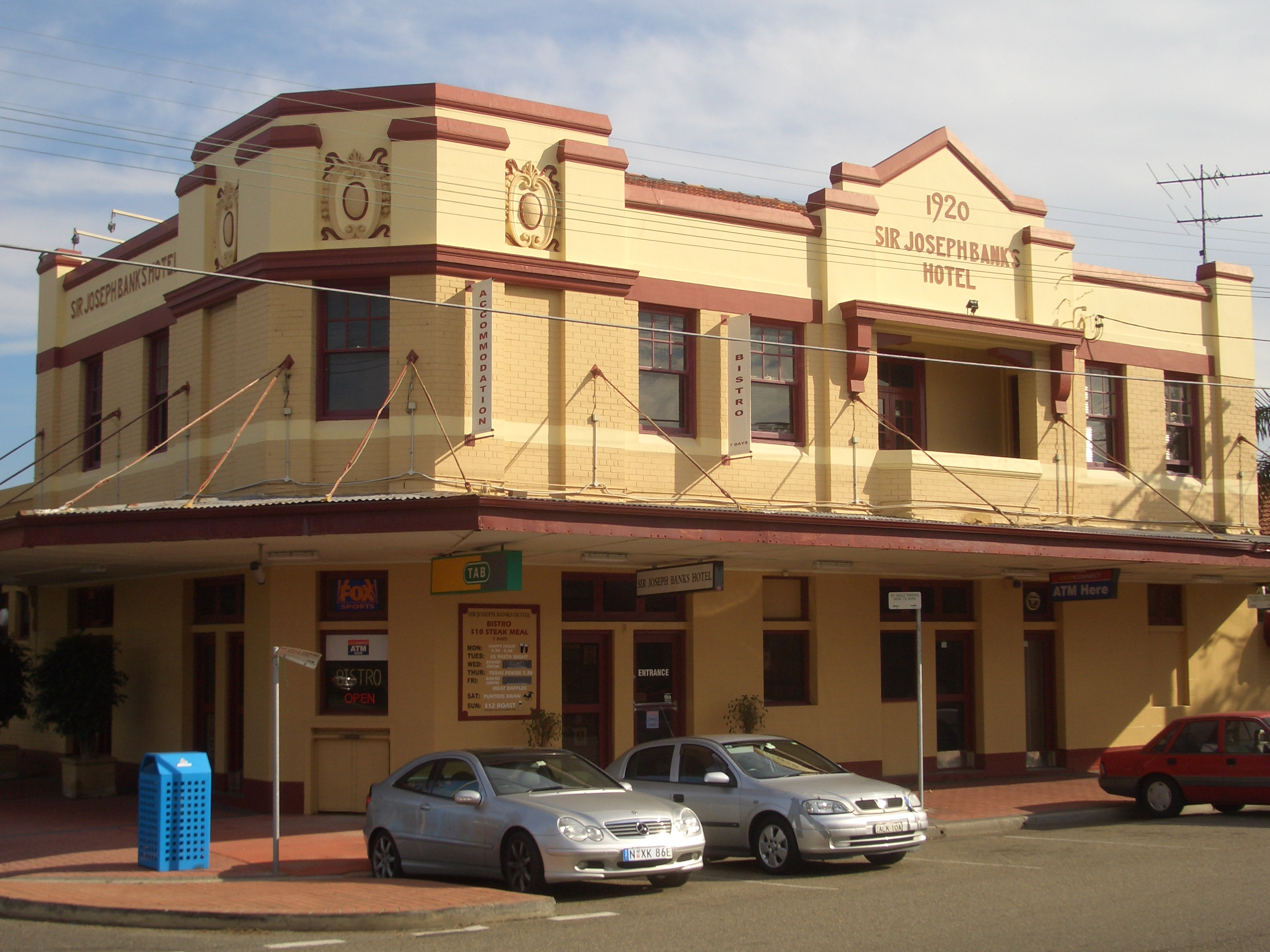
Sir Joseph Banks Hotel (1920), Botany Road

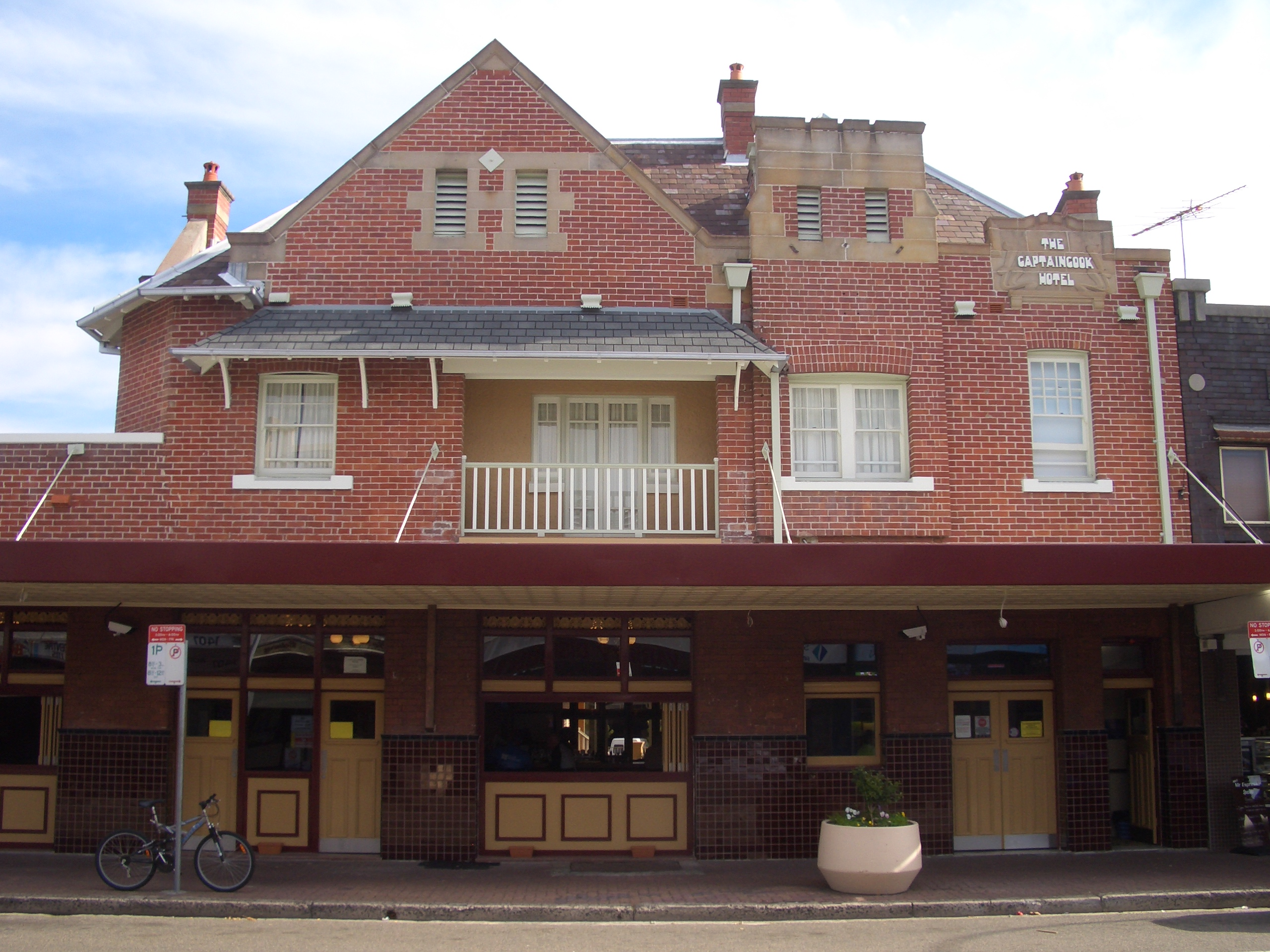
The Captain Cook Hotel, Botany Road

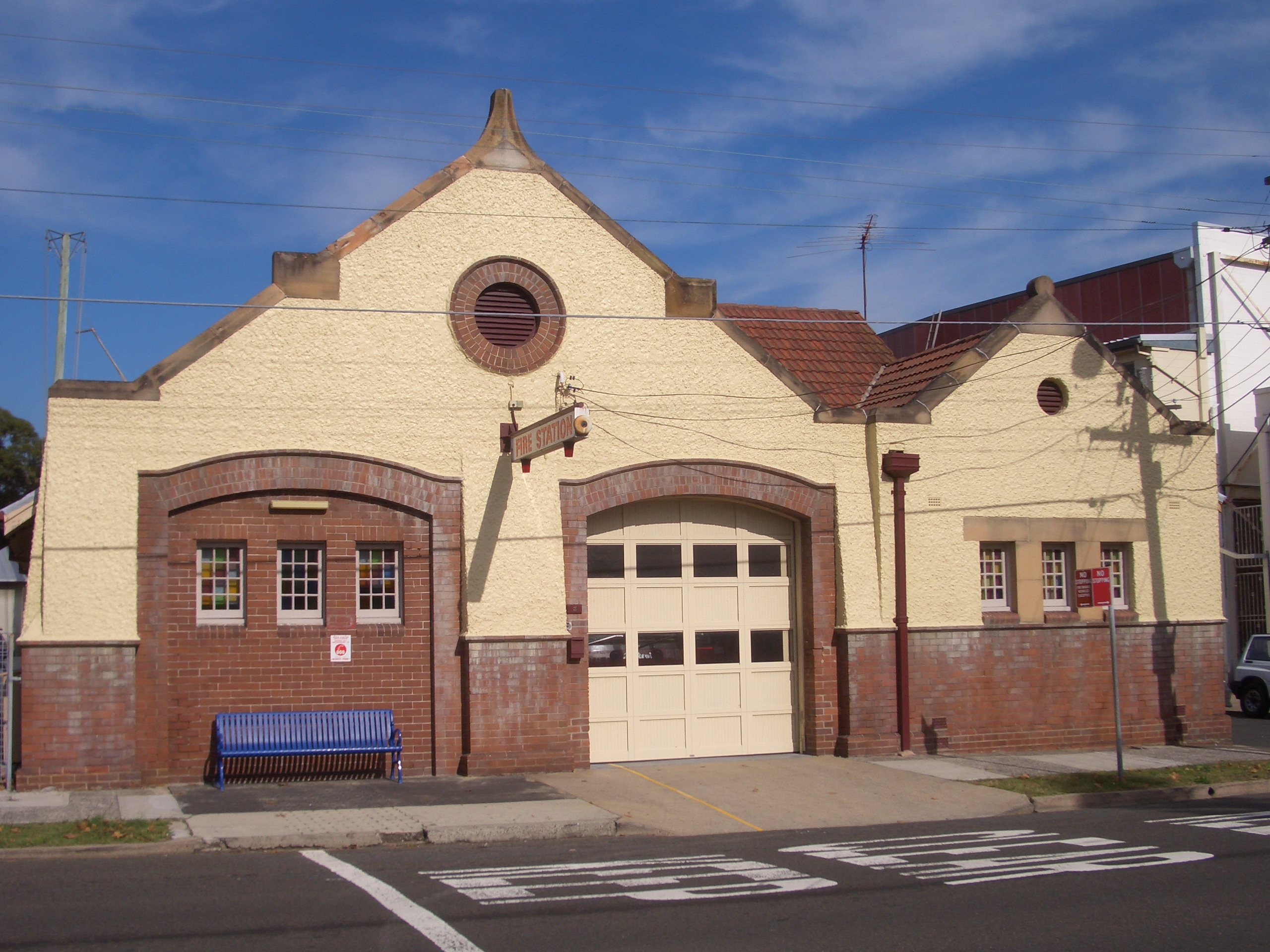
Fire Station in Arts and Crafts style, Banksia Street

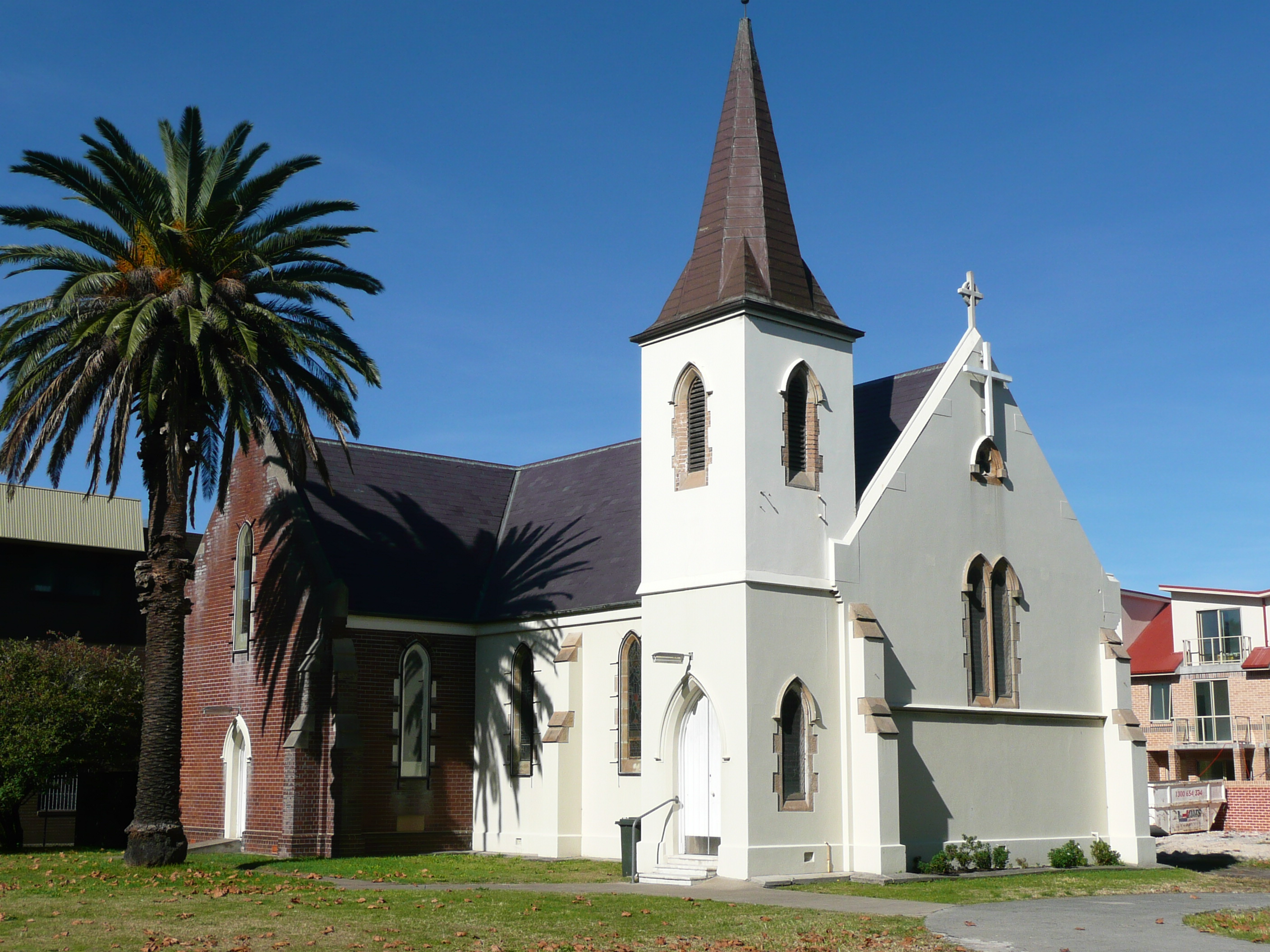
St Matthew's Anglican Church, Botany Road

== Sir Joseph Banks Park ==
Sir Joseph Banks Park comprises Foreshore Reserve and the Sir Joseph Banks Pleasure Gardens. Foreshore Reserve is 28 hectares of bushland on land reclaimed from Botany Bay. The Reserve features walking tracks through sand dunes to protected wetlands, formed around a network of ponds. The Pleasure Gardens reflect the history of the area with a zoo playground featuring life size animal statues, a mosaic depicting Banks's journey, decorative flag terrace, Banksia garden and the central oval running track. A statue of Sir Joseph Banks examining botanical specimens is located in the pleasure gardens.

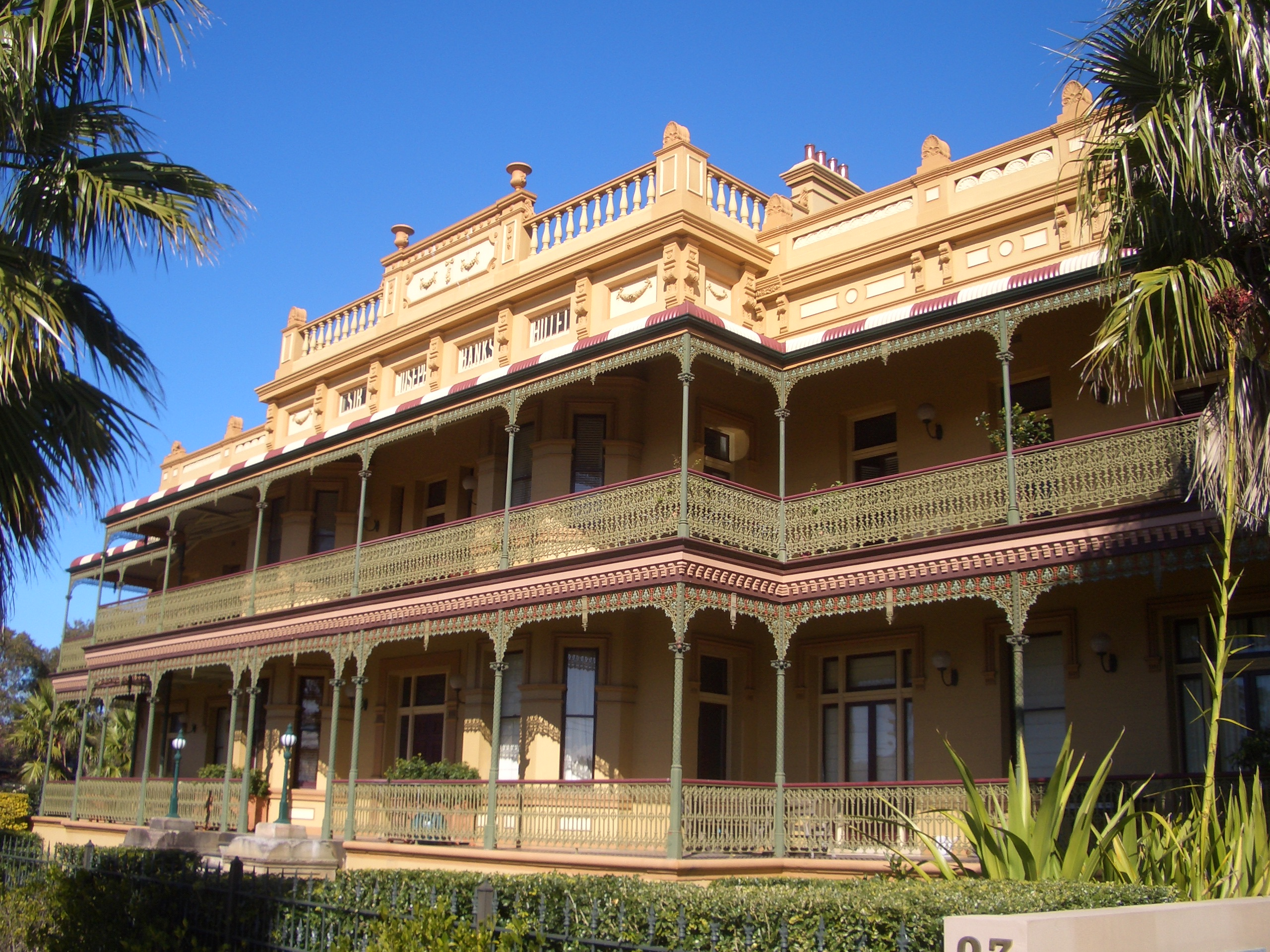
Historic Sir Joseph Banks Hotel, Anniversary Street, beside the Pleasure Grounds

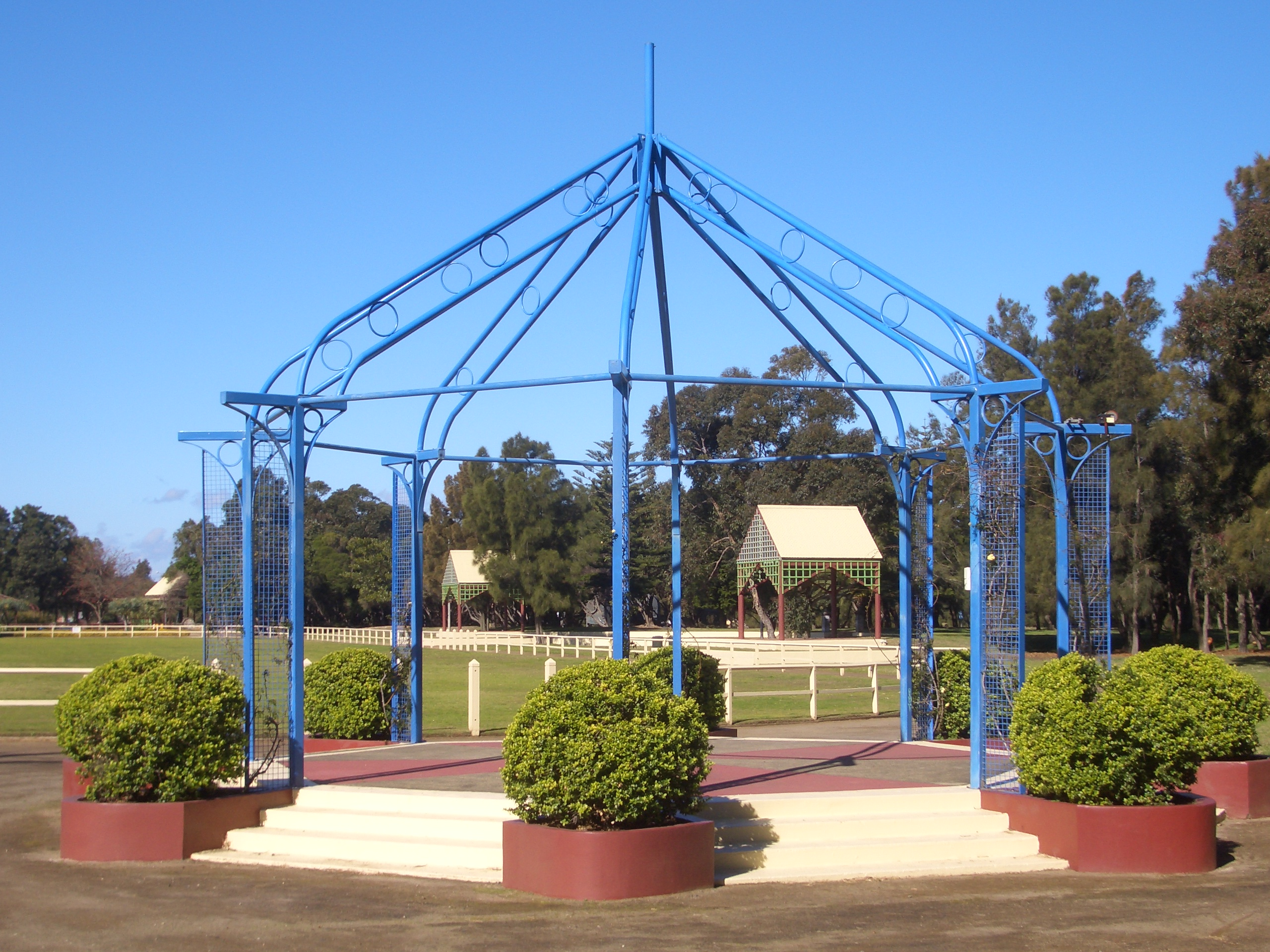
Arbour in Sir Joseph Banks Pleasure Gardens

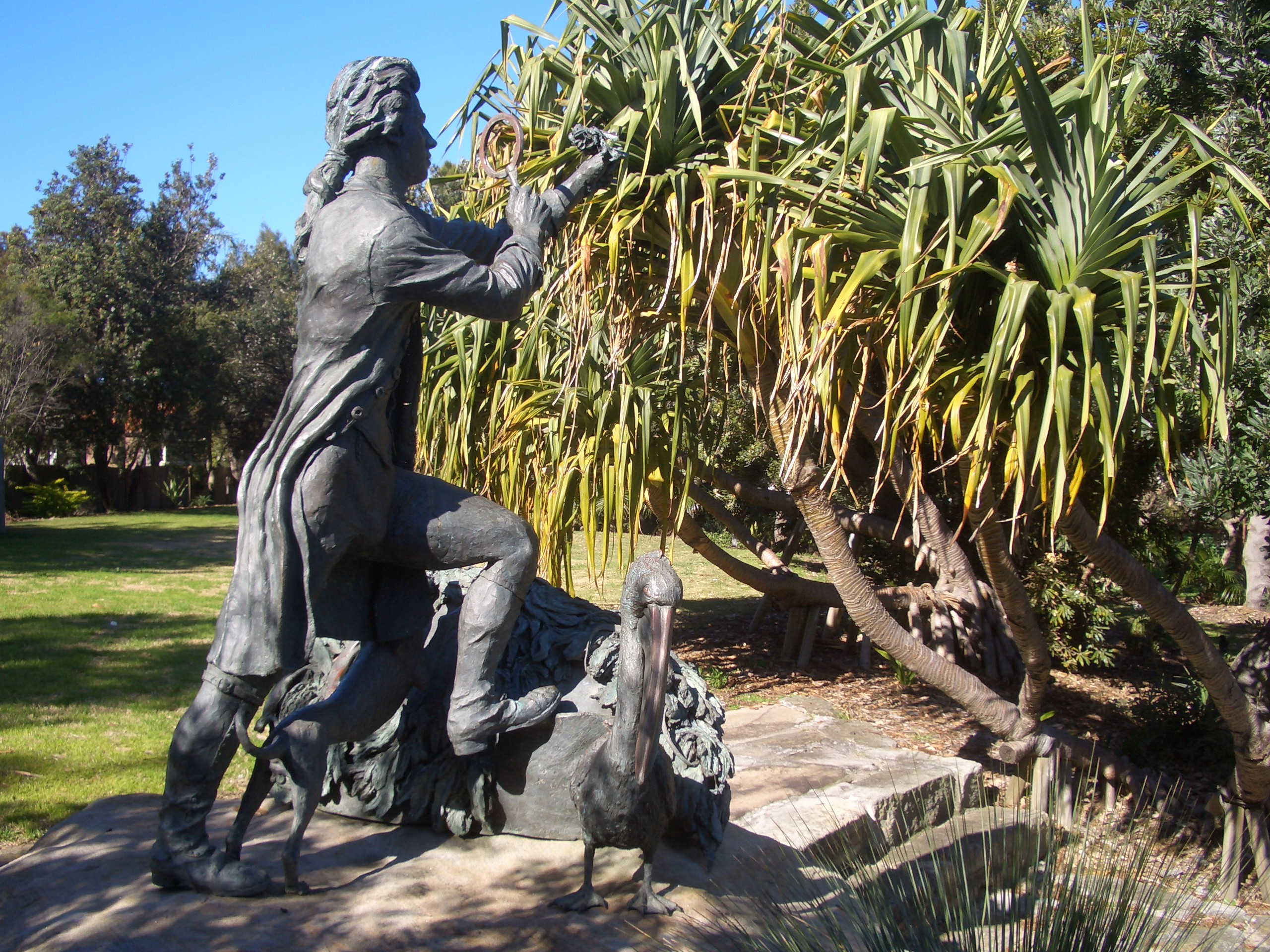
Sir Joseph Banks statue

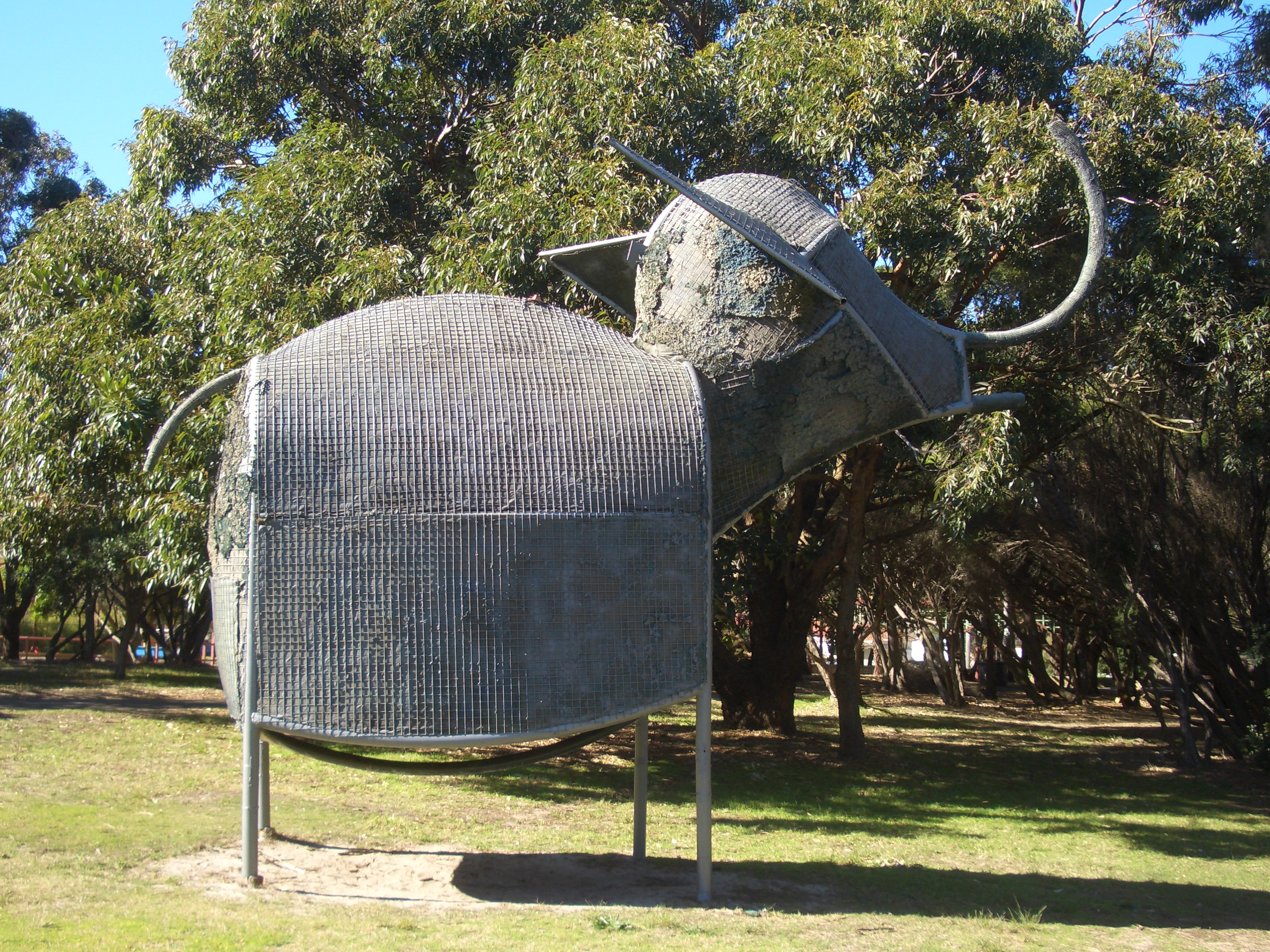
Elephant sculptures

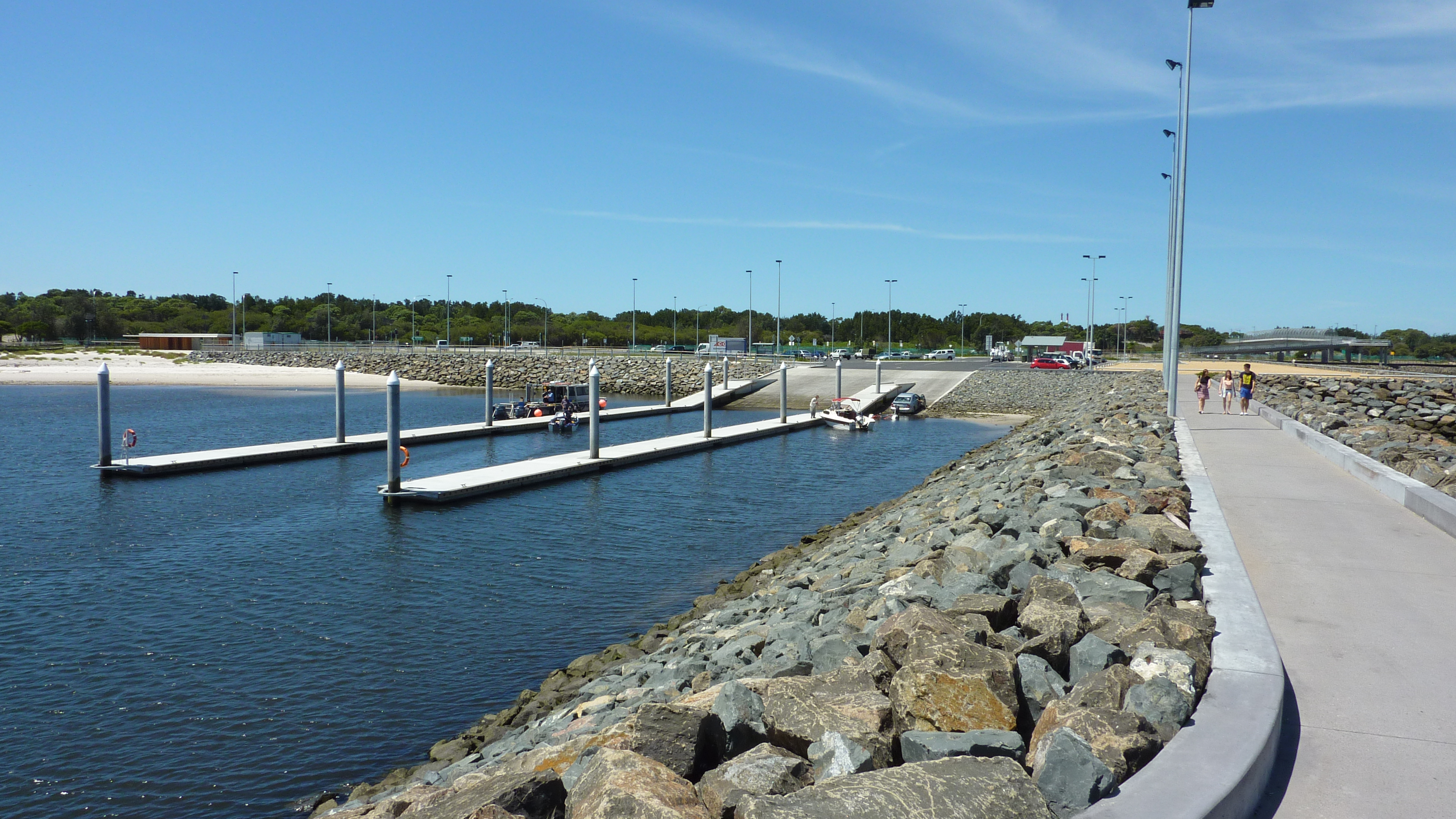
Foreshore Beach boat ramp

== Sport and recreation ==
A number of well-known sporting teams represent the local area. One of them is the well known NRL club named the South Sydney Rabbitohs and Botany Rams some other teams are Pagewood Botany Soccer Club, Botany Golf Club, Bonnie Doon Golf Club, Eastlake Golf Club and The Lakes Golf Club. Lady Robinsons Beach is a prominent beach in the area.

== Schools ==
Botany Public School is located in Botany Road. The original schoolroom is a small brick building with Gothic influences, built in 1868.

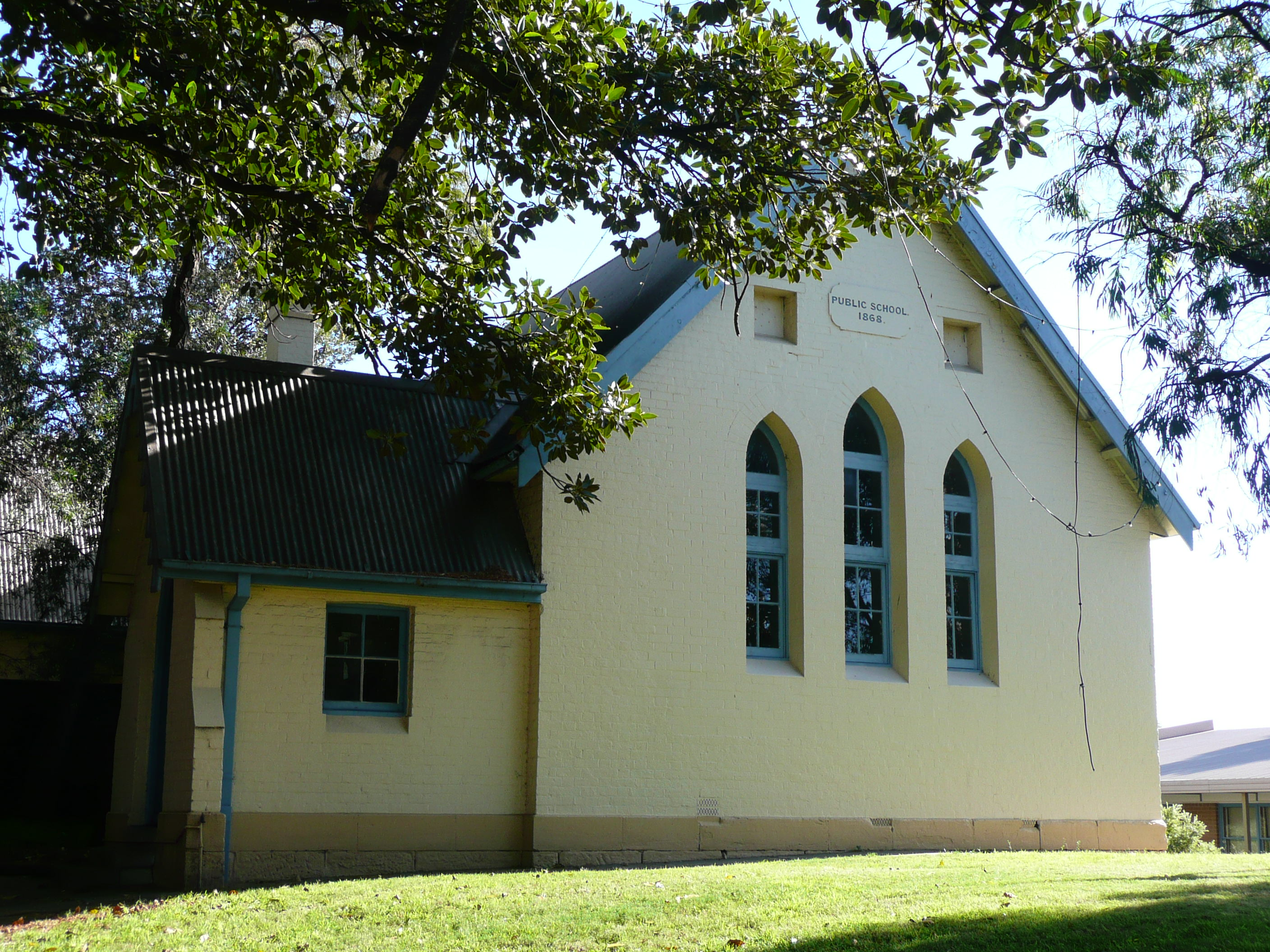
Botany Public School

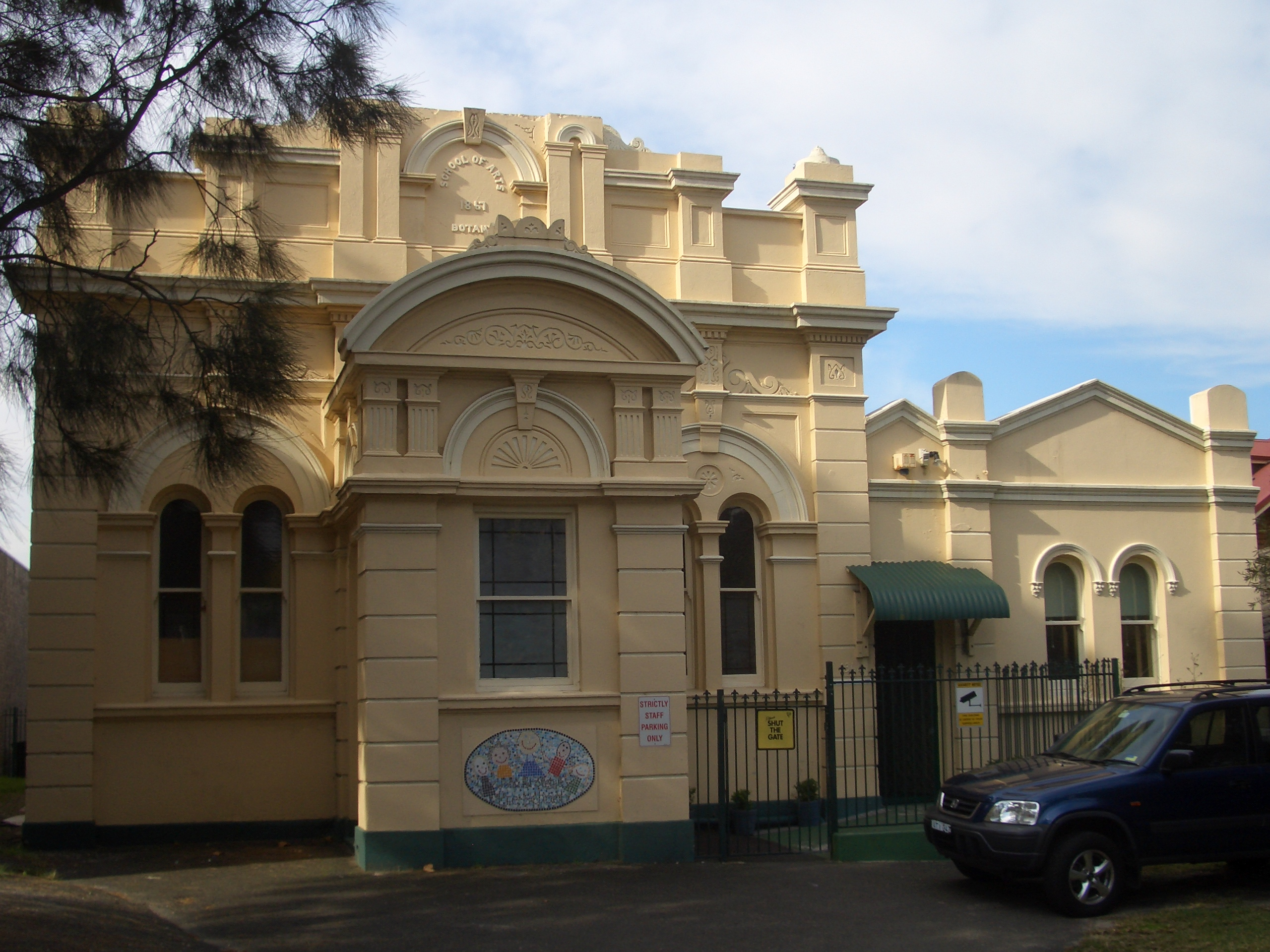
John Brotchie Nursery School
