= Botany Bay Groundwater Plume =

Botany Bay Groundwater Plume is contamination of the local aquifer in Botany Bay caused by a chemical leak. The groundwater that flows into Botany Bay contains pollutants linked to cancer and is regarded as the worst case of groundwater contamination in Australia.

The plume originated from on old ICI site that was built in the 1940s and has been owned by Orica since 1997. The plant once manufactured paints, plastics and industrial chemicals such as solvents.

Millions of litres of toxic chemicals are estimated to have seeped through the sandy soils and into the aquifer, which is used as a water source for industry and residents. Levels of chemicals such as hexachlorobenzene and ethylene dichloride are at 5000 times their safe levels in some places Testing in 1994 demonstrated levels of ethylene dichloride as high as 6,800 mg/L was present in the groundwater and the plumes are moving in a southerly direction at a rate of about 90 metres (295 ft) per year.
