= Old Sir Joseph Banks Hotel =

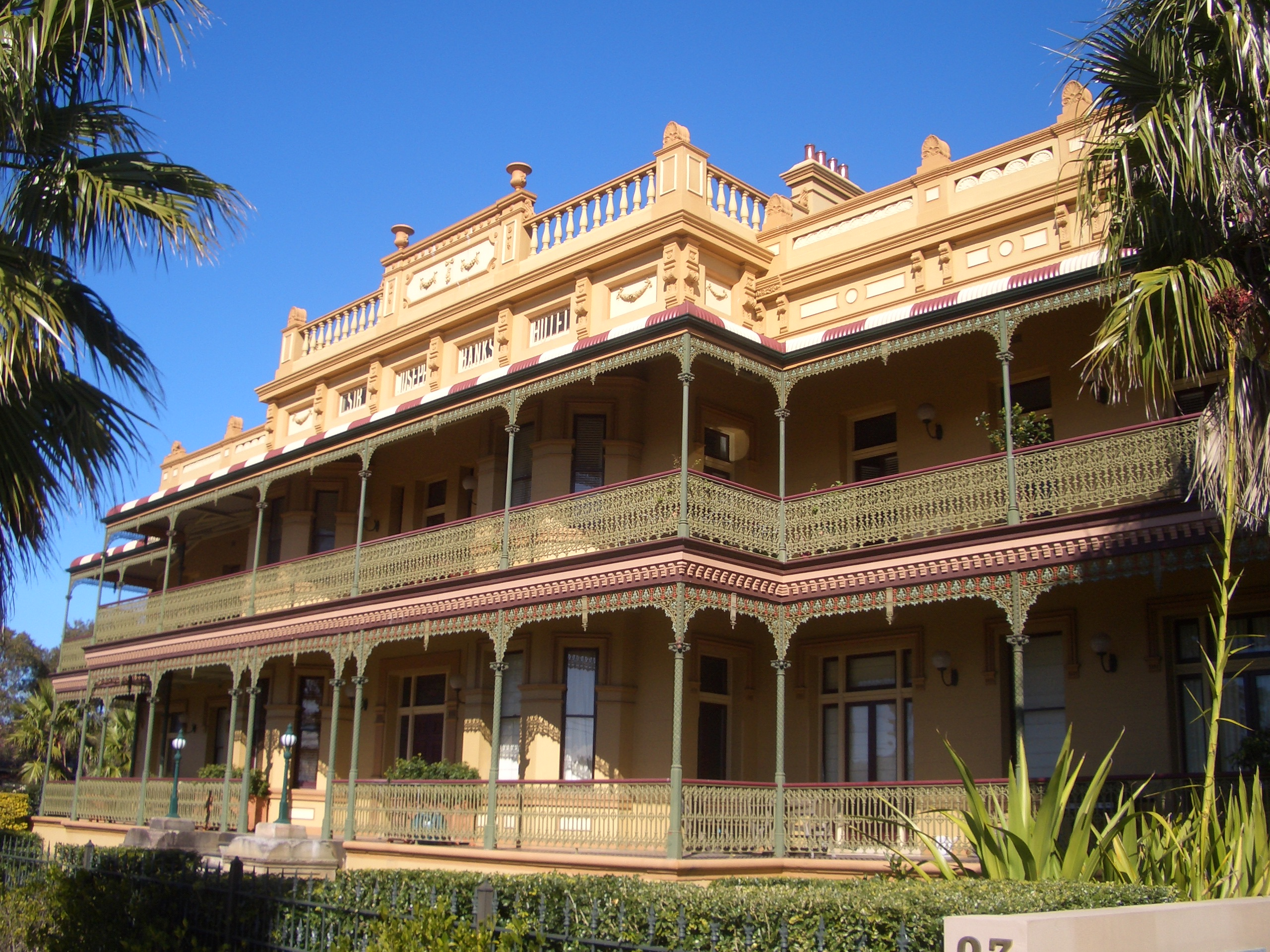

- Location within east Sydney
- 33°57′19″S 151°12′10″E
- Location: 23 Anniversary Street, Botany, Bayside Council, New South Wales, Australia

History
- Built: 1840–1874

Site notes
- Architectural style: Victorian Filigree
- Owner: former Sir Joseph Banks Hotel

New South Wales Heritage Register
- Official name: Sir Joseph Banks Hotel (former); Sir Joseph Banks Hotel; Banks Inn
- Type: state heritage (complex / group)
- Designated: 2 April 1999
- Reference no.: 76
- Type: Hotel
- Category: Commercial

The Old Sir Joseph Banks Hotel is a heritage-listed former hotel at 23 Anniversary Street, Botany, Bayside Council, New South Wales, Australia. It was built from 1840 to 1874. It was also known as Banks Inn. It was added to the New South Wales State Heritage Register on 2 April 1999.

== History ==
The Old Sir Joseph Banks Hotel is a large former bayside hotel of considerable historical and architectural worth, which remains virtually intact from early Victorian times. The building was begun by Thomas Kellet and J. Drew in 1840, and it (then known as the Banks Inn) had by the 1850s developed gardens, a private zoo and provision for outdoor sports. It became a popular weekend and holiday pleasure ground.

About 1860, a further single storey wing to the east was added. The main two-storey north wing was added around the year 1870 in Italianate style.

It was bought in 1884 by entrepreneur Frank Smith, who set up famous running races from 1884–92, and later passed into hands of breweries.

In 1920, a new hotel was built on Botany Road - the modern Sir Joseph Banks Hotel - and both the old hotel's name and license were transferred to the new hotel. It remained vacant until being sold to James Ruttley in 1930, and remained in the family as a residence for many years.

The hotel was again sold, restored and converted into apartments in or around the year 2000. A new apartment block was built next to the former hotel at that time.

== Description ==
The former hotel consists of a large complex of stuccoed brick. The first part was begun in 1840, being a two-storey Georgian building, with flanking single-storey wings, named the Banks Inn. About 1860, a further single storey wing to the east was added with curved facade and verandah and steeply pitched hipped roofs. The main two-storey north wing was added in or around the year 1870 in Italianate style, heavily ornamented with slab. It featured parapets and two storey cast iron verandahs and an interior of carved cedar.

== Heritage listing ==
The old Sir Joseph Banks Hotel is a large former bay side hotel of considerable historical and architectural worth, which remains virtually intact from early Victorian times.

Sir Joseph Banks Hotel was listed on the New South Wales State Heritage Register on 2 April 1999.

== Aboriginal burial site ==
The site of the old Sir Joseph Banks Hotel contains a traditional burial ground of the Kamaygal people who resided in the area before and during British colonisation. Several Kamaygal identities from the early colonial period, including Mahroot, were buried in the gardens of the hotel toward the beach.

== See also ==
- Australian non-residential architectural styles
