= Imperial Chemical Industries =

Former British chemicals, paints and pharmaceuticals company

Imperial Chemical Industries plc
- Final logo designed by Wolff Olins from 1988 to 2008.
- Type: Public
- Traded as: LSE: ICI; FTSE 100 component (until 2008)
- Industry: Chemicals
- Founded: 1926; 100 years ago
- Defunct: 2008; 18 years ago
- Fate: Acquired by AkzoNobel
- Headquarters: London, England, UK
- Key people: Alfred Mond (first CEO); Sir Paul Chambers; Sir John Harvey-Jones; Dr John McAdam (last CEO); M.R.Rajaram (first CFO of ICI India Limited)(first Whole-time Director)
- Products: General chemicals, plastics, paints, pharmaceuticals & speciality chemicals
- Revenue: £4.85 billion (2006)
- Operating income: £502 million (2006)
- Net income: £295 million (2006)
- Number of employees: 29,130 (2006)
- Parent: AkzoNobel

Imperial Chemical Industries (ICI) was a British chemical company. It was, for much of its history, the largest manufacturer in Britain. Its headquarters were at Millbank in London. ICI was listed on the London Stock Exchange and was a constituent of the FT 30 and later the FTSE 100 indices.

ICI was formed in 1926 as a result of the merger of four of Britain's leading chemical companies. From the onset, it was involved in the production of various chemicals, explosives, fertilisers, insecticides, dyestuffs, non-ferrous metals, and paints; the firm soon became involved in plastics and a variety of speciality products, including food ingredients, polymers, electronic materials, fragrances and flavourings. During the Second World War, ICI's subsidiary ICI Nobel produced munitions for Britain's war effort; the wider company was also involved with Britain's nuclear weapons programme codenamed Tube Alloys. Throughout the 1940s and 1950s, ICI greatly expanded its activities in the pharmaceutic sector; culminating in the formation of a dedicated subsidiary, ICI Pharmaceuticals, in 1957.

During 1960, ICI's first outsider to serve as chairman, Paul Chambers, was appointed. Chambers reorganised the company, but fell out of favour following an unsuccessful takeover bid of rival firm Courtaulds. Between 1968 and 1971, Peter Allen was chairman of ICI, during which time Viyella was purchased, the subsidiary Cleveland Potash Ltd was created, and profits dipped. Major moves in the 1970s included the acquisition of the American competitor Atlas Chemical Industries Inc. and the divestment of Imperial Metal Industries. By the late 1980s, ICI which had continued to acquire entities such as the Beatrice Chemical Division and Glidden Coatings & Resins, increasing competition and rising internal complexity were driving ICI towards major restructuring plans, including a demerger.

Considerable changes at ICI came about during the 1990s, particularly in the aftermath of an unsuccessful acquisition attempt in 1991 by Hanson of the firm in what would have been the biggest takeover in British history. That same year, ICI sold its agricultural and merchandising operations of BritAg and Scottish Agricultural Industries to Norsk Hydro; it sold its nylon business to DuPont one year later. In 1993, the firm also de-merged its pharmaceutical bio-science businesses as Zeneca. During 1997, ICI's Australian subsidiary, ICI Australia, was sold for £1 billion. During 2008, ICI was acquired by AkzoNobel for £8 billion; shortly thereafter, portions of ICI were sold off to Henkel while its remaining operations were integrated within AkzoNobel's existing organisation.

== History ==
=== Development of the business (1926–1944) ===
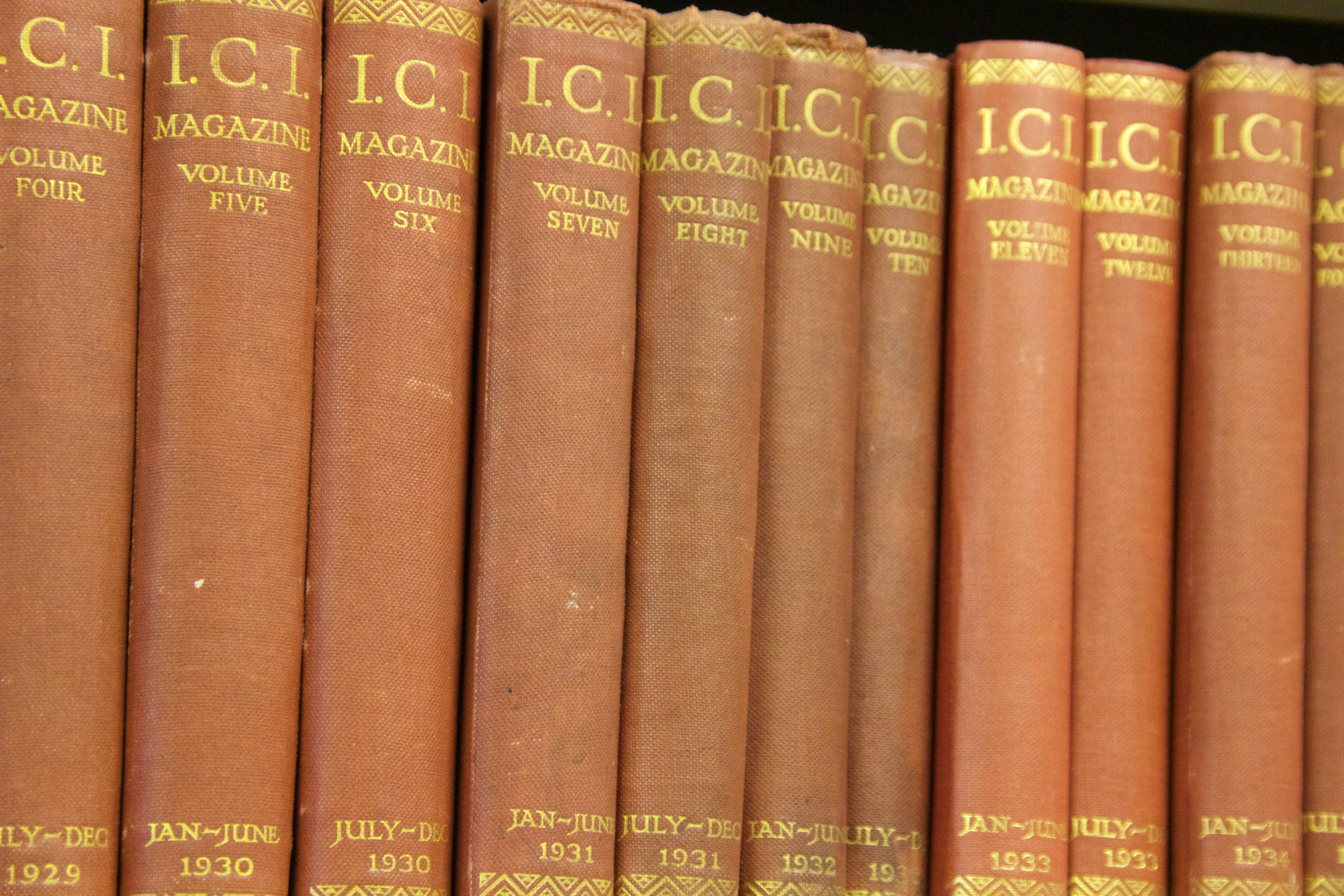
1930s volumes of ICI magazine

The company was founded in December 1926 from the merger of four companies: Brunner Mond, Nobel Explosives, the United Alkali Company, and British Dyestuffs Corporation. ICI established its head office at Millbank in London in 1928. Competing with DuPont and IG Farben, the new company produced chemicals, explosives, fertilisers, insecticides, dyestuffs, non-ferrous metals, and paints. In its first year, turnover was £27 million.

During the 1920s and 1930s, the company played a key role in the development of new chemical products, including the dyestuff phthalocyanine (1929), the acrylic plastic Perspex (1932), Dulux paints (1932, co-developed with DuPont), polyethylene (1937), and polyethylene terephthalate fibre known as Terylene (1941). In 1940, ICI started British Nylon Spinners as a joint venture with Courtaulds.

ICI also owned the Sunbeam motorcycle business, which had come with Nobel Industries, and continued to build motorcycles until 1937.

During the Second World War, ICI was a major participant in Britain's war economy; its subsidiary ICI Nobel was involved in the production of munitions. The company was involved with the United Kingdom's nuclear weapons programme codenamed Tube Alloys.

=== Postwar innovation (1945–1990) ===
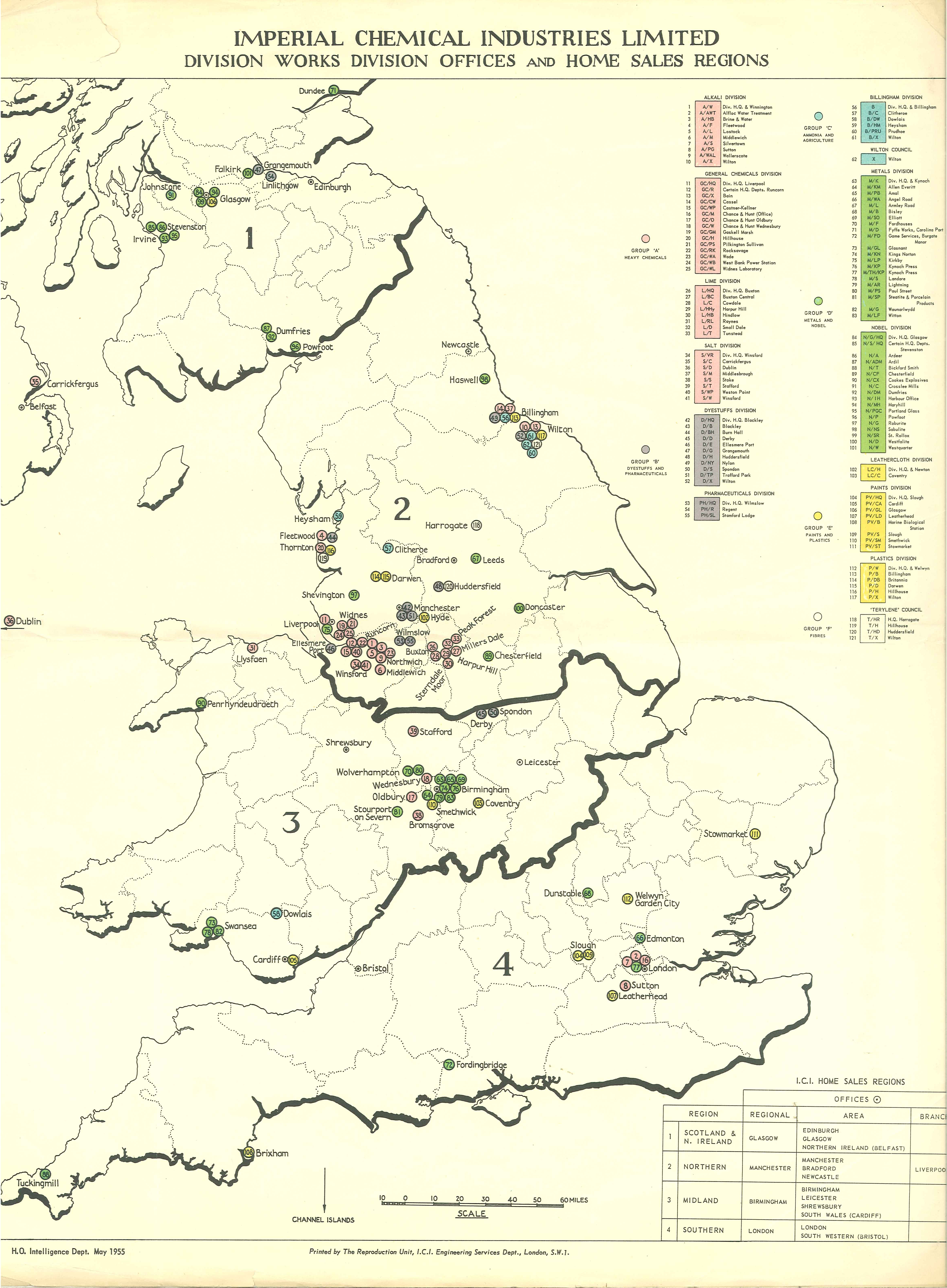
Map showing Imperial Chemical Industries sales regions, offices and factories in the United Kingdom in May 1955

In the 1940s and 1950s, the company established its pharmaceutical business and developed a number of key products, including Paludrine (1940s, an anti-malarial drug), halothane (1951, an inhalational anaesthetic agent), propofol (1977, an intravenous anaesthetic agent), Inderal (1965, a beta-blocker), tamoxifen (1978, a frequently used drug for breast cancer), and PEEK (1979, a high performance thermoplastic).

During the 1950s, ICI developed a material as Crimplene, a thick polyester yarn that was used to make a fabric of the same name. The resulting cloth is heavy and wrinkle-resistant, and retains its shape well. The California-based fashion designer Edith Flagg was the first to import this fabric from Britain to the United States.

During 1960, Paul Chambers became the first chairman appointed from outside the company. Chambers employed the consultancy firm McKinsey to help with reorganising the company. Export sales doubled during his eight-year tenure export, however, Chambers' reputation was severely damaged by a failed takeover bid for Courtaulds in 1961–1962.

On 1 August 1962, ICI's operations in Burma were nationalised following a military coup in the country.

In 1964, ICI acquired British Nylon Spinners (BNS), the company it had jointly set up in 1940 with Courtaulds. ICI surrendered its 37.5 per cent holding in Courtaulds and paid Courtaulds £2 million a year for five years, "to take account of the future development expenditure of Courtaulds in the nylon field." In return, Courtaulds transferred to ICI their 50 per cent holding in BNS.

Early pesticide development under ICI Plant Protection Division, with its plant at Yalding, Kent, research station at Jealott's Hill and HQ at Fernhurst Research Station included paraquat (1962, a herbicide), the insecticides pirimiphos-methyl in 1967 and pirimicarb in 1970, brodifacoum (a rodenticide) was developed in 1974; in the late 1970s, ICI was involved in the early development of synthetic pyrethroid insecticides such as lambda-cyhalothrin.

Peter Allen was appointed chairman between 1968 and 1971. He presided over the purchase of Viyella. Profits shrank under his tenure. During his tenure, ICI created the wholly owned subsidiary Cleveland Potash Ltd, for the construction of Boulby Mine in Redcar and Cleveland, North Yorkshire. The first shaft was dug in 1968, with full production from 1976. ICI jointly owned the mine with Anglo American, and then with De Beers, before complete ownership was transferred to Israel Chemicals Ltd in 2002.

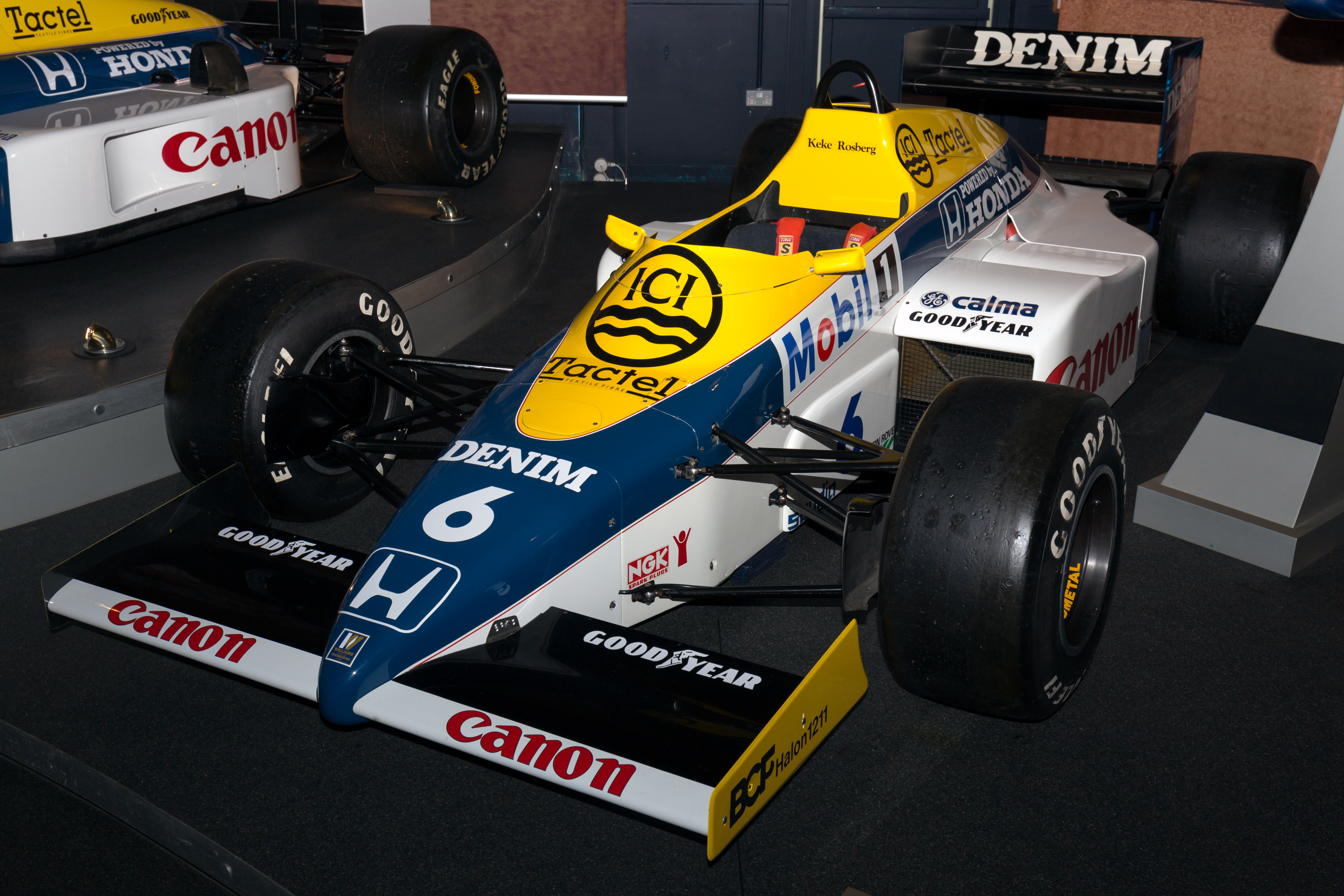
ICI sponsored Williams Racing from 1983 to 1990.

Between 1971 and 1975, Jack Callard held the position of chairman at the firm. Amid Callard's tenure, company profits almost doubled between 1972 and 1974 while ICI became Britain's largest exporter. In 1971, the company acquired Atlas Chemical Industries Inc., a major American competitor. In 1977, Imperial Metal Industries was divested as an independent quoted company.

Between 1982 and 1987, the company was headed by the charismatic John Harvey-Jones. In 1985, ICI acquired the Beatrice Chemical Division; during the following year, it also bought Glidden Coatings & Resins, a leading paints business.

=== Reorganisation of the business (1991–2007) ===
By the early 1990s, plans were carried out to demerge the company, as a result of increasing competition and internal complexity that caused heavy retrenchment and slowing innovation. In 1991, ICI sold the agricultural and merchandising operations of BritAg and Scottish Agricultural Industries to Norsk Hydro. It also divested its soda ash products arm to Brunner Mond, ending an association with the trade that had existed since the company's inception, one that had been inherited from the original Brunner, Mond & Co. Ltd.

During mid 1991, ICI was subject to an attempted acquisition by Hanson; by this point, ICI was commonly being viewed by investors as having been in decline and thus its valuation was depressed, making it more vulnerable to such takeover attempt. Hanson had acquired a 2.8 per cent stake in the company as part of its hostile takeover attempt, which ICI's management team chose to oppose. The envisioned acquisition became hotly contested and controversial, partially as it would have been the biggest takeover in British history at that point. In October 1991, Hanson opted to not proceed with the deal.

In 1992, the company sold its nylon business to DuPont. During 1993, the company de-merged its pharmaceutical bio-science businesses: pharmaceuticals, agrochemicals, specialities, seeds and biological products were all transferred into a new and independent company called Zeneca. Zeneca subsequently merged with Astra AB to form AstraZeneca.

In 1994, Charles Miller Smith was appointed CEO of ICI, one of the few times that an external figure had been appointed to lead the firm, Miller-Smith having previously been a director at Unilever. Shortly afterwards, the company acquired a number of former Unilever businesses in an attempt to move away from its historical reliance on commodity chemicals. During 1995, ICI acquired the American paint companies Devoe Paints, Fuller-O'Brien Paints and Grow Group. In 1997, ICI acquired National Starch & Chemical, Quest International, Unichema, and Crosfield, the speciality chemicals businesses of Unilever in exchange for $8 billion. This step was part of a strategy to move away from cyclical bulk chemicals and to progress up the value chain to become a higher growth, higher margin business. Later that same year, it went on to buy Rutz & Huber, a Swiss paints business.

Having taken on some £4 billion of debt to finance these acquisitions, the company was soon compelled to sell off its commodity chemicals businesses:

- Disposals of bulk chemicals businesses at that time included the sale of its Australian subsidiary, ICI Australia, for £1 billion in 1997, and of its polyester chemicals business to DuPont for $3 billion also in 1997.
- In 1998, it bought Acheson Industries Inc., an electronic chemicals business.
- In 2000, ICI sold its diisocyanate, advanced materials, and speciality chemicals businesses on Teesside and worldwide (including plants at Rozenburg in the Netherlands, and South Africa, Malaysia and Taiwan), and Tioxide, its titanium dioxide subsidiary, to Huntsman Corporation for £1.7 billion. It also sold the last of its industrial chemicals businesses to Ineos for £325 million.
- In 2002, the ICI wholly transferred ownership of Boulby Mine to Israel Chemicals Ltd.
- In 2006, the Company sold Quest International, its flavours and fragrances business, to Givaudan, for £1.2 billion and Uniqema, its oleochemical business, to Croda International, for £410 million.

Having sold much of its historically profitable commodities businesses, and many of the new speciality businesses which it had failed to integrate, the company consisted mainly of the Dulux paints business, which found itself the subject of a takeover by AkzoNobel in 2007.

=== Takeover by AkzoNobel ===
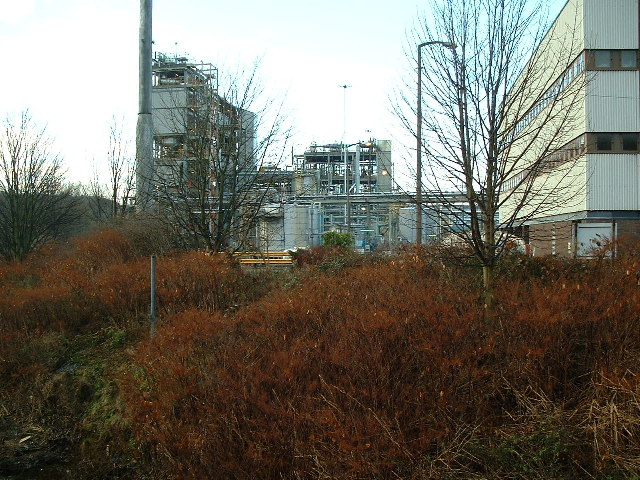
A former ICI plant in Huddersfield, West Yorkshire, now owned by Syngenta.

In June 2007, the Dutch firm AkzoNobel (owner of Crown Berger paints) bid £7.2 billion (€10.66 billion or $14.5 billion) for ICI. An area of concern about a potential deal was ICI's British pension fund, which had a deficit of almost £700 million and future liabilities of more than £9 billion at the time. Regulatory issues in the UK and other markets where Dulux and Crown Paints brands each have significant market share were also a cause for concern for the boards of ICI and AkzoNobel. In the UK, any combined operation without divestments would have seen AkzoNobel have a 54 per cent market share in the paint market. The initial bid was rejected by the ICI board and the majority of shareholders. However, a subsequent bid for £8 billion (€11.82 billion) was accepted by ICI in August 2007, pending approval by regulators.

On 2 January 2008, completion of the takeover of ICI plc by AkzoNobel was announced. Shareholders of ICI received either £6.70 in cash or AkzoNobel loan notes to the value of £6.70 per one nominal ICI share. The adhesives business of ICI was transferred to Henkel as a result of the deal, while AkzoNobel agreed to sell its Crown Paints subsidiary to satisfy the concerns of the European Commissioner for Competition. The areas of concern regarding ICI's British pension scheme were addressed by ICI and AkzoNobel.

== Operations ==
ICI operated a number of chemical sites around the world. In the UK, the main plants were as follows:

- Billingham Manufacturing Plant (in Stockton-on-Tees) and Wilton (in present-day Redcar and Cleveland): ICI used the Billingham site to manufacture fertilisers in the 1920s and went on to produce plastics at Billingham in 1934. During World War II it manufactured Synthonia, a synthetic ammonia for explosives. The Wilton R&D site was built to support the plastics division with R&D and chemical engineering facilities. The ICI Billingham Division was split into the ICI Heavy Organic Chemicals Division and ICI Agricultural Division in the 1960s. From 1971 to 1988 ICI Physics and Radioisotopes Section (later known as Tracerco) operated a small General Atomics TRIGA Mark I nuclear reactor at its Billingham factory for the production of radioisotopes used in the manufacture of flow and level instruments, among other products. The Agricultural Division was noted for the development of the world's largest bioreactor at the time – the 1.5 million litre Pruteen Reactor, used for the cultivation of animal feed. Engineering models of components and the builder's model of the complete plant are now in the collection of the Science Museum London. Pruteen had limited economic success but was followed by the much more successful development of Quorn.
- Blackley (in Manchester) and Huddersfield: ICI used the sites to manufacture dyestuffs. The dye business, known as the ICI Dyestuffs Division in the 1960s, went through several reorganisations. Huddersfield was tied in with Wilton with the production of nitrobenzene and nitrotoluene. Huddersfield also produced insecticides. (Syngenta still manufacture insecticides at Huddersfield). Proxel Biocide was made at Huddersfield from the 80s onwards. Additives also made at Huddersield. Huddersfield became Zeneca then AstraZeneca, in 2004 Huddersfield was Syngenta, Avecia, Arch and Lubrizol running what were all ICI plants at one time. Through the years it was combined with other speciality chemicals businesses and became Organics Division. Then became ICI Colours and Fine Chemicals and then ICI Specialties.
- Buxton (in Derbyshire): ICI Lime Division was formed in 1927 with the acquisition of Buxton Lime Firms. Quarrying started at Tunstead in 1929 and it became the largest limestone quarry in the UK. In 1992 ICI sold its Lime Division to Anglo American as part of its UK Tarmac operation.
- Runcorn (in Cheshire): ICI operated a number of separate sites within the Runcorn area, including the Castner-Kellner site, where ICI manufactured chlorine and sodium hydroxide (caustic soda). Adjacent to the Castner-Kellner site was Rocksavage works, where a variety of chemicals based on chlorine products were manufactured, including Chloromethanes, Arklone dry-cleaning fluid (Trichlorotrifluoroethane), Trichloroethylene degreasing fluid and the Arcton range of CFCs. Also on that site were PVC manufacture and HF (Hydrogen fluoride) manufacture. At Runcorn Heath Research Laboratories, technical support, research and development for Mond Division products was carried out, and the support sections included chemical plan design and engineering sections. Just to the north of Runcorn, on an island between the Manchester Ship Canal and the River Mersey could be found the Wigg Works, which had been erected originally for producing poison gas in wartime. In Widnes could also be found several factories producing weedkillers and other products. For many years it was known as ICI Mond Division but later became part of the ICI Chemicals and Polymers Division. The Runcorn site was also responsible for the development of the HiGEE and Spinning Disc Reactor concepts. These were originated by Professor Colin Ramshaw and led to the concept of Process Intensification; research into these novel technologies is now being pursued by the Process Intensification Group at Newcastle University.
- Winnington and Wallerscote (in Northwich, Cheshire): It was here that ICI manufactured sodium carbonate (soda ash) and its various by-products such as sodium bicarbonate (bicarbonate of soda), and sodium sesquicarbonate. The Winnington site, built in 1873 by the entrepreneurs John Tomlinson Brunner and Ludwig Mond, was also the base for the former company Brunner, Mond & Co. Ltd. and, after the merger which created ICI, the powerful and influential Alkali Division. It was at the laboratories on this site that polythene was discovered by accident in 1933 during experiments into high pressure reactions. Wallerscote was built in 1926, its construction delayed by the First World War, and became one of the largest factories devoted to a single product (soda ash) in the world. However, the decreasing importance of the soda ash trade to ICI in favour of newer products such as paints and plastics, meant that in 1984 the Wallerscote site was closed, and thereafter mostly demolished. The laboratory where polythene was discovered was sold off and the building became home to a variety of businesses including a go-kart track and paintballing, and the Winnington Works were divested to the newly formed company, Brunner Mond, during 1991. It was again sold in 2006, to Tata (an Indian-based company) and in 2011 was rebranded as Tata Chemicals Europe. The Winnington plant closed in February 2014, with the last shift on 2 February bringing to a close 140 years of soda ash production in this Northwich site.
- Ardeer (in Stevenston, Ayrshire): ICI Nobel used the site to manufacture dynamite and other explosives and nitrocellulose-based products. For a time, the site also produced nylon and nitric acid. Nobel Enterprises was sold in 2002 to Inabata.
- Penrhyndeudraeth (Gwynedd, North Wales): Cooke's Works, part of ICI's Nobel's Explosives Company division produced nitroglycerine-based explosives up until the site's closure in 1995.
- Slough (in Berkshire): Headquarters of ICI Paints Division.
- Stowmarket : Plant Manufacturing White, and off white Paints
- Prudhoe - Plant Manufacturing Hammerite Paints
- Birmingham: Plant Manufacturing Packaging Coatings for food and beverage cans
- Welwyn Garden City (in Hertfordshire): Headquarters of ICI Plastics Division until the early 1990s.

=== Argentina ===
An ICI subsidiary called Duperial operated in Argentina from 1928 to 1995, when it was renamed ICI.

Established in the city of San Lorenzo, Santa Fe, it operates an integrated production site with commercial offices in Buenos Aires. Since 2009 it has made sulphuric acid with ISO certification under the company name Akzo Nobel Functional Chemicals S.A. - now Nouryon.

It also had an operation at Palmira, Mendoza, for its Wine Chemicals Division, that manufactured tartaric acid, wine alcohol and grapeseed oil from natural raw material coming from the wine industry in the provinces of Mendoza and San Juan. This operation held 10% world market share for tartaric acid. It was sold in 2008 and currently operates as Derivados Vínicos S.A. (DERVINSA).

=== Australia ===
The subsidiary ICI Australia Ltd established the Dry Creek Saltfields at Dry Creek north of Adelaide, South Australia, in 1940, with an associated soda ash plant at nearby Osborne. In 1989, these operations were sold to Penrice Soda Products.

An ICI plant was built at Botany Bay in New South Wales in the 1940s and was part of the Orica demerger in 1997. This plant once manufactured paints, plastics and industrial chemicals such as solvents. It had been detirmined to be the source of the Botany Bay Groundwater Plume contamination of a local aquifer.

=== Bangladesh ===
In 1968 a subsidiary of Imperial Chemical Industries (ICI) was established in then-East Pakistan. After Bangladesh gained independence in 1971, the company was incorporated on 24 January 1973 as ICI Bangladesh Manufacturers Limited and also as Public Limited Company. The company divested its investment in Bangladesh and was renamed as Advanced Chemical Industries Limited (ACI Limited) on 5 May 1992. The company sold its insect control, air care and toilet care brands to SC Johnson & Son in 2015. Currently Advanced Chemical Industries (ACI) Limited is one of the largest conglomerates in Bangladesh with a multinational heritage operating across the country. The company operates through three reporting divisions: Pharmaceuticals, Consumer Brands and Agribusiness.

=== Sri Lanka ===
ICI maintained offices in Colombo importing and supplying chemicals for manufacturers in Ceylon. In 1964, following import restrictions that allowed only locally owned subsidiaries of multinational companies to gain import licenses, Chemical Industries (Colombo) Limited was formed as an ICI subsidiary with 49% ICI ownership and remaining held public.

=== New Zealand ===
The subsidiary ICI New Zealand provided substantial quantities of chemical products – including swimming pool chemicals, commercial healthcare products, herbicides and pesticides for use within New Zealand and the neighbouring Pacific Islands.

A fire at the ICI New Zealand store in Mount Wellington, Auckland, on 21 December 1984, killed an ICI employee and caused major health concerns. Over 200 firefighters were exposed to toxic smoke and effluents during the firefighting efforts. Six firefighters retired for medical reasons as a result of the fire. This incident was a major event in the history of the New Zealand Fire Service and subject to a formal investigation, led by future Chief Justice Sian Elias. The fire was a trigger for major reforms of the service; direct consequences included improved protective clothing for firefighters, a standard safety protocol for major incidents, the introduction of dedicated fireground safety officers, and changes to occupational health regulations.

== See also ==
- Imperial Chemical House
- IMI plc (formerly Imperial Metal Industries)
- Pharmaceutical industry in the United Kingdom
