= Phillip Bay =

- Suburb
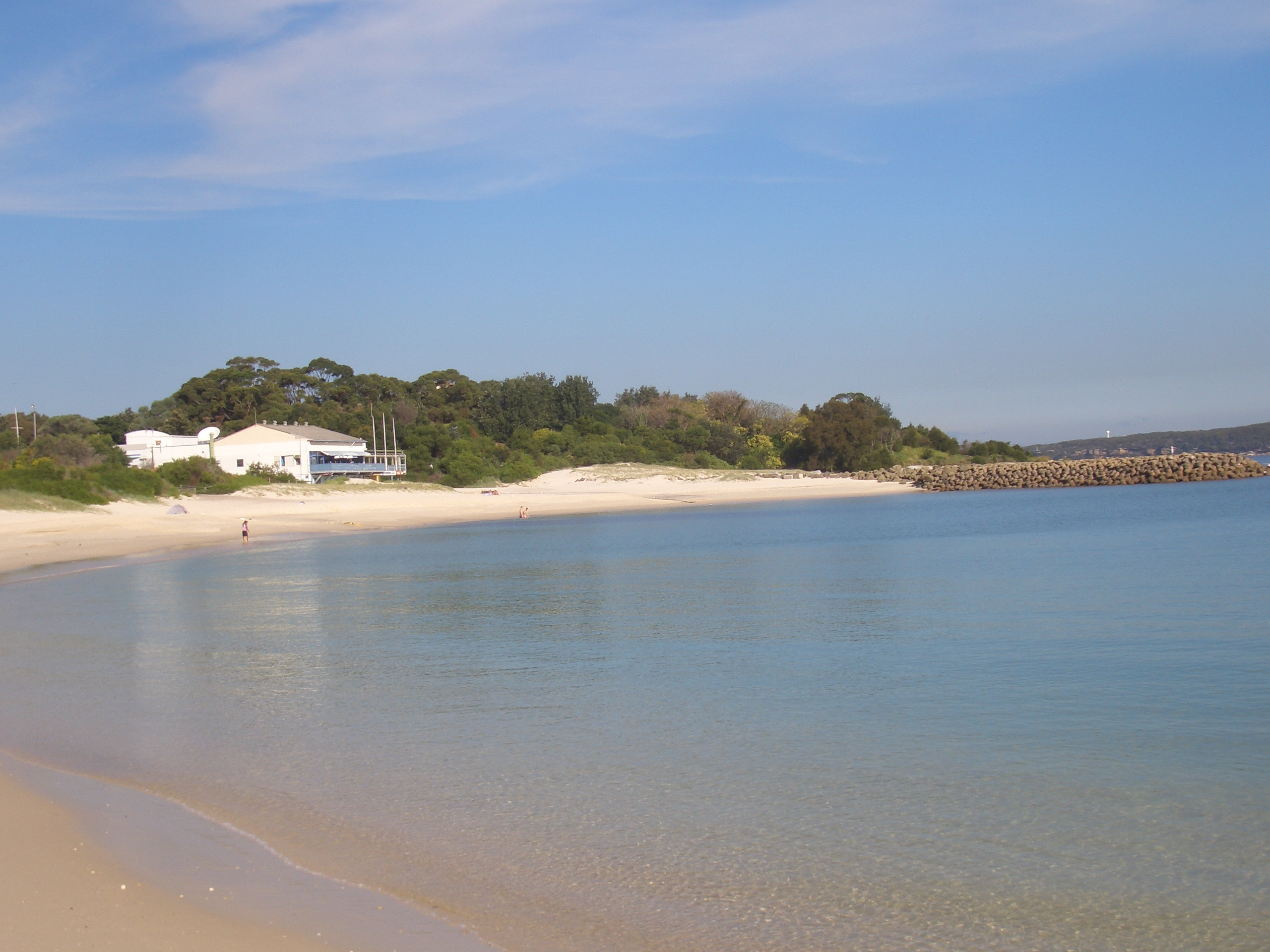
- Yarra Bay at Phillip Bay

- Interactive map of Phillip Bay
- Coordinates: 33°58′51″S 151°14′02″E
- Country: Australia
- State: New South Wales
- City: Sydney
- LGA: City of Randwick
- Location: 13 km (8.1 mi) south-east of Sydney CBD

Government
  - State electorate: Maroubra
  - Federal division: Kingsford Smith
- Elevation: 15 m (49 ft)

Population
  - Total: 721 (2021 census)
- Postcode: 2036
Suburbs around Phillip Bay
Matraville	Matraville	Chifley
Port Botany	Phillip Bay	Little Bay
Port Botany	Botany Bay	La Perouse

Phillip Bay is a suburb in the Eastern Suburbs of Sydney, in the state of New South Wales, Australia 13 kilometres south-east of the Sydney central business district, in the local government area of the City of Randwick. Its postcode is 2036.

== Description ==
Phillip Bay is one of the smallest suburbs in Randwick Municipality, in spite of including Yarra Bay and Bicentennial Park. It is a low-density residential area with a large variety of housing types, including villas, cottages, blocks of flats up to three storeys and townhouses. It has an extremely high percentage of detached homes: 80%, compared to the average of 28% in the Randwick Municipality. Semidetached homes are relatively few as a percentage of total housing: 6.4% compared to an average of 15% in the municipality.

Catholic and Baptist churches can be found in Yarra Road and an Aboriginal Evangelical Church in Adina Avenue, although it was disused as of 2009. La Perouse Primary School is situated in Yarra Road, Phillip Bay. Beach and recreational areas are situated along Yarra Bay. Yarra Bay House is located on Yarra Point, between Frenchmans Bay and Yarra Bay.

== History ==
=== Aboriginal People ===
Aboriginal people were the first to live at Phillip Bay and La Perouse. Their presence was recorded by Arthur Phillip and the French expedition led by Lapérouse who arrived within six days of each other in January 1788. A camp was established at Phillip Bay in 1883, under the Aborigines Protection Board. The settlement has been run by a variety of church and welfare groups over time. The reserve was moved back from the unstable sand to around the Elaroo Avenue area, at the end of the 1920s. The area is now owned by Aboriginal people, as is Yarra Bay House and the headland between Frenchmans Bay and Yarra Bay.

=== Europeans ===
The First Fleet ship HMS Supply carrying Captain Arthur Phillip arrived in Botany Bay on 18 January 1788. The anchorage was named "Phillip Bay". Examination of the immediate vicinity by Phillip concluded the area 'unsuitable for habitation'. After the arrival of Captain John Hunter in HMS Sirius on 20 January, Phillip, Hunter and two other men explored the coast northwards by boat, eventually finding Port Jackson. The fleet was then relocated to what became Sydney Cove.

The adjacent suburb La Perouse was named after Jean-François de Galaup, comte de La Pérouse who arrived at Botany Bay on 26 January 1788 just as the First Fleet was being relocated. "Phillip Bay" was eventually renamed "Yarra Bay" based on its Aboriginal name while the suburb has retained the original European name.

The area around La Perouse developed as many seaside suburbs did through outdoor pastimes and weekend visitors, especially after the tram line was built in around 1900. Many unemployed people built makeshift homes in the Phillip Bay area during the Great Depression of the 1920s and 1930s. "Happy Valley" and "Hill 60" were to the north and mostly housed white people, while Aboriginal people mostly lived in the "Frog Hollow" area to the south.

=== Yarra Bay House ===
Yarra Bay House was built in 1903 as an addition to the Cable Station at La Perouse. When a second cable was laid in 1890, extra room was needed to house the workers. When the Cable Station became obsolete after 1917, the house was home to various government departments including the Director of Public Instruction (later the Education Department) and the Department of Youth and Community Services.

In 1985, the title was given to the Aboriginal Land Council. A freshwater billabong has been constructed at the Back of Yarra Bay House to encourage the return of local frogs and birdlife. Restoration of the building was being carried out as of 2009.

== Population ==
In the 2021 Census, there were 721 people in Phillip Bay. 67.8% of people were born in Australia and 73.0% of people spoke only English at home. The most common responses for religion in Phillip Bay were Catholic 37.9%, No Religion 28.0% and Anglican 12.8%.

== Landmarks ==
- Yarra Bay House, Yarra Bay Sailing Club
- Yarra Bay, Yarra Point, Bumborah Point, Bicentennial Park.

== Gallery ==
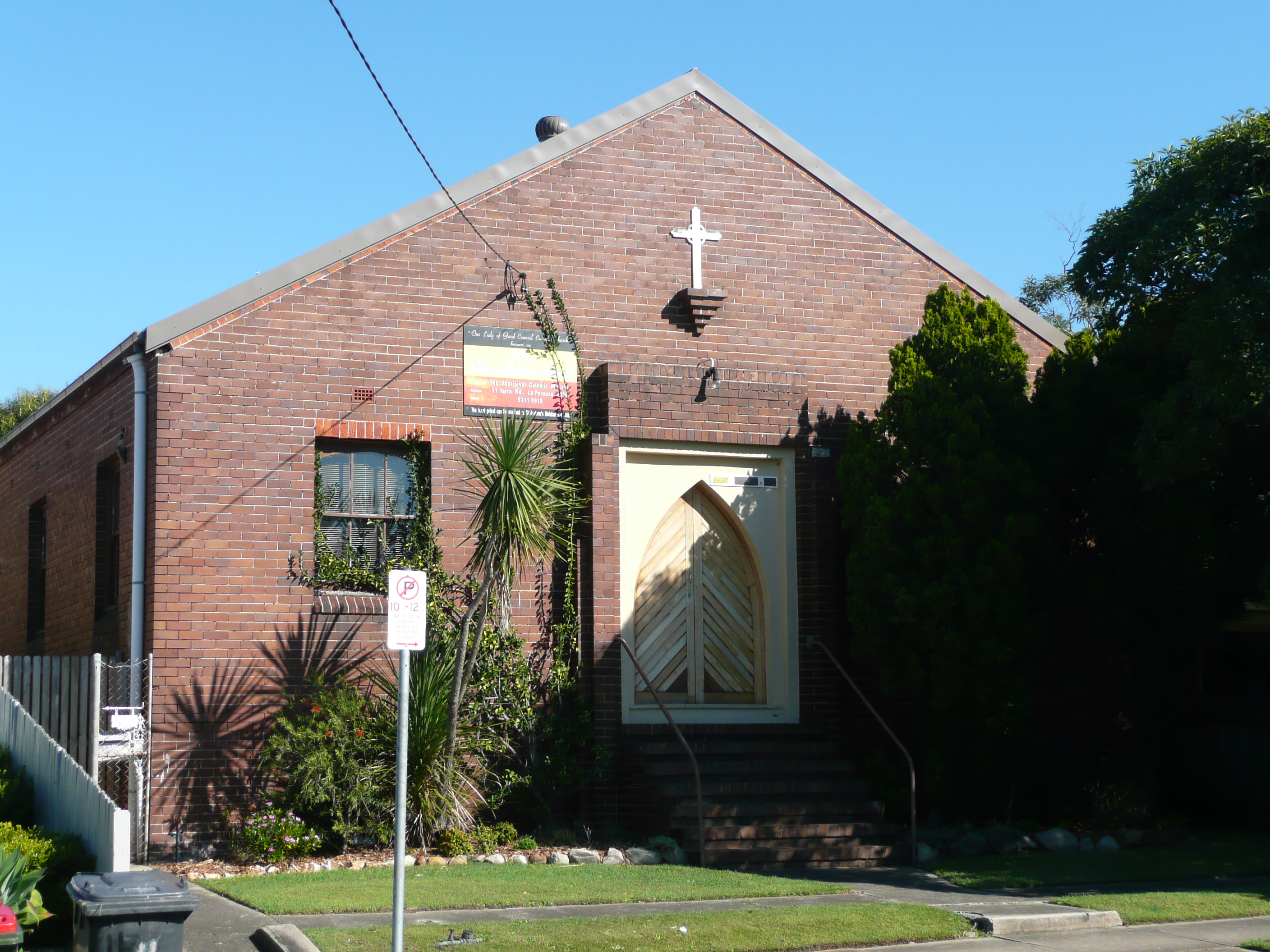
Catholic Church, known as The Reconciliation Church, Yarra Road

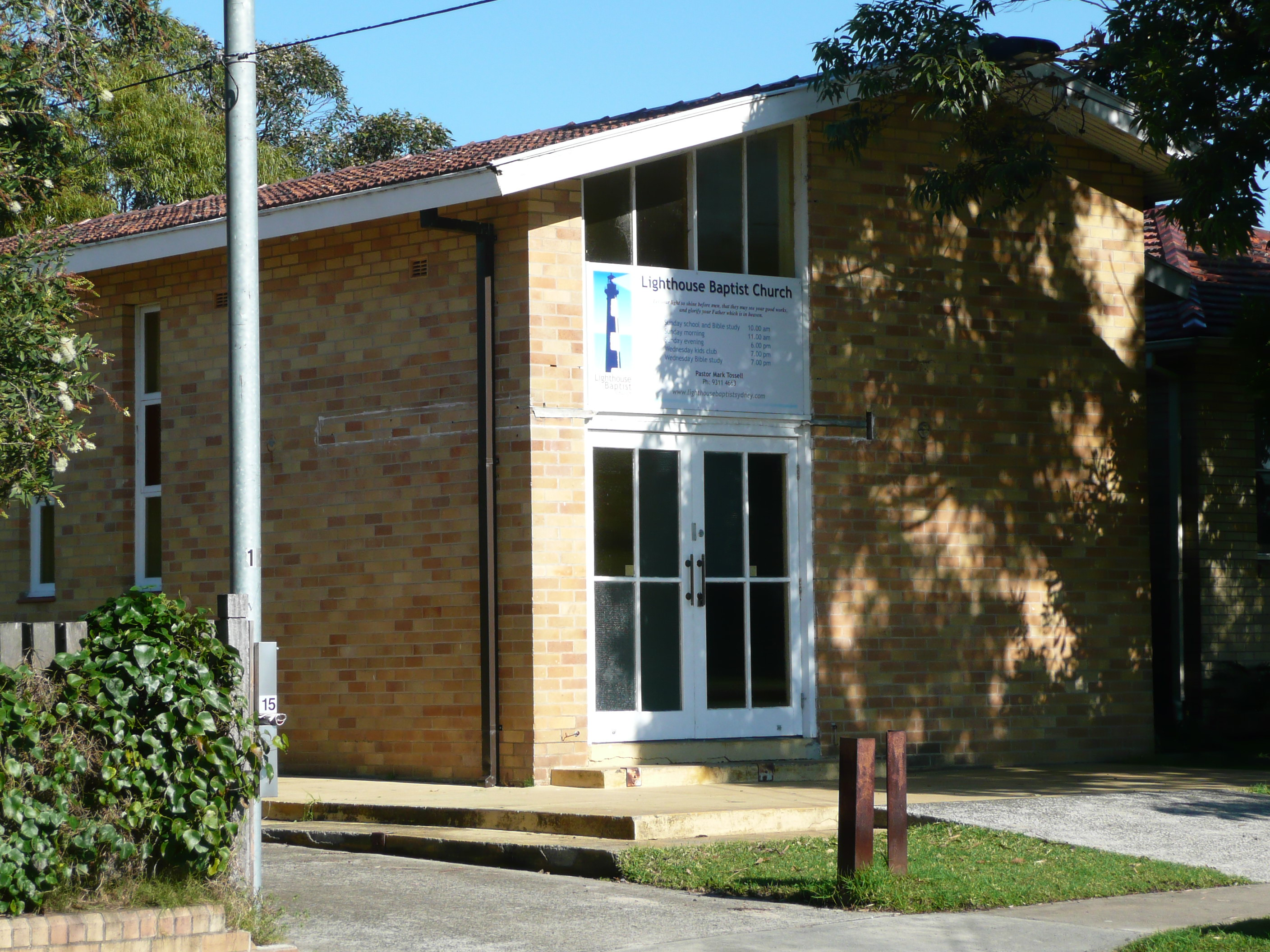
Lighthouse Baptist Church, Yarra Road

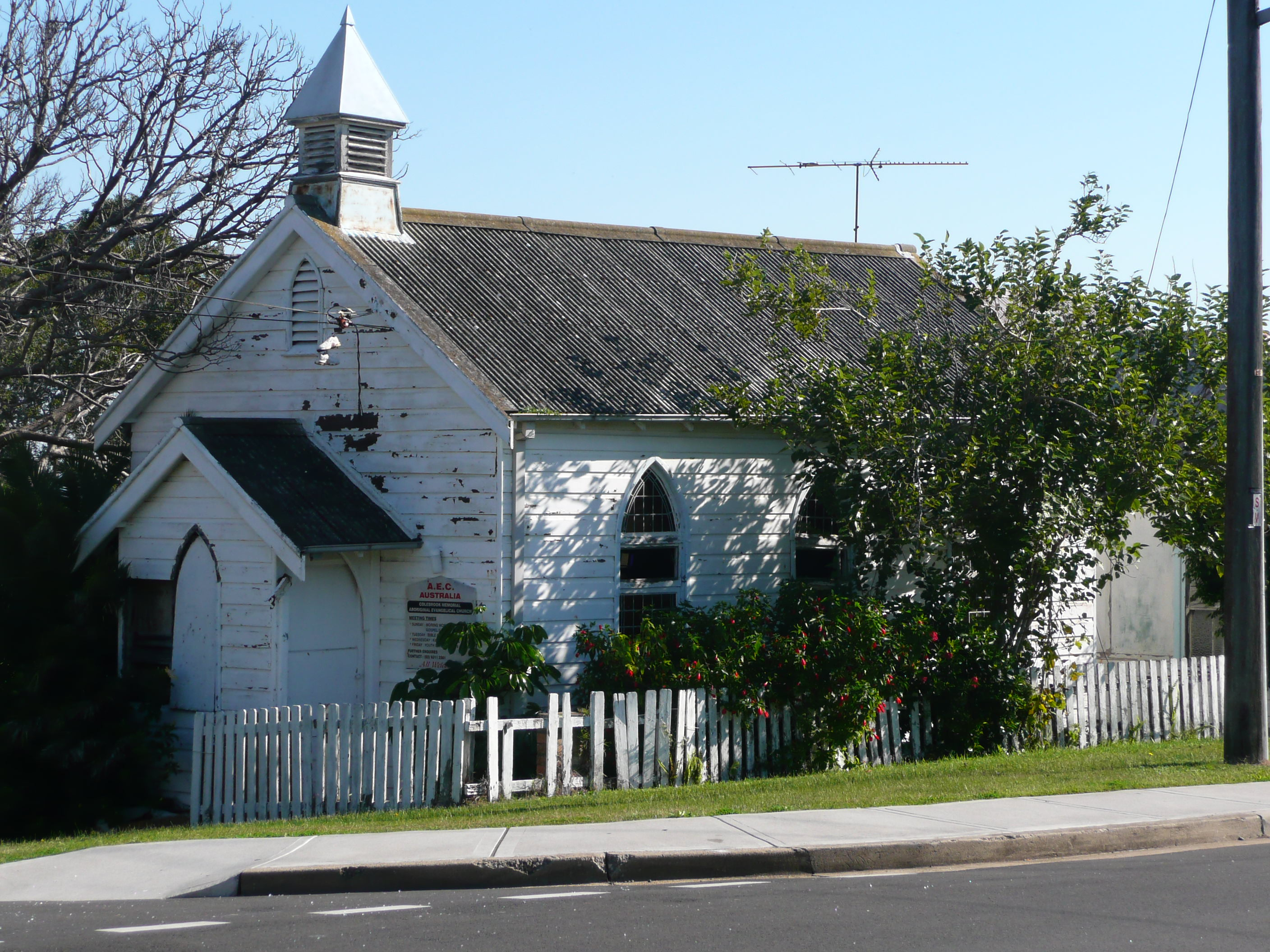
Colebrook Memorial Aboriginal Evangelical Church, Adina Avenue

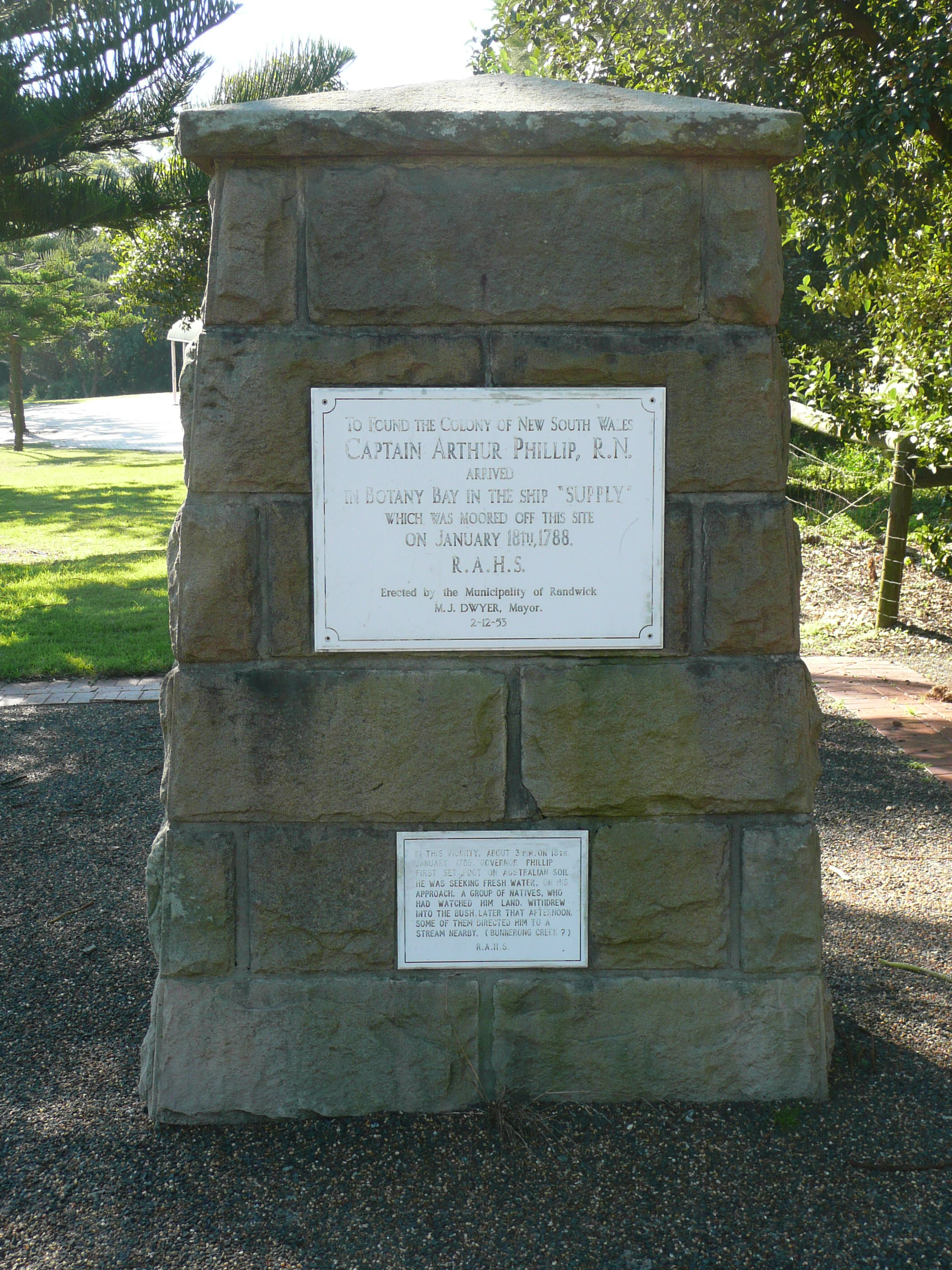
Memorial to HMS Supply anchoring in Yarra Bay in 1788, Bicentennial Park

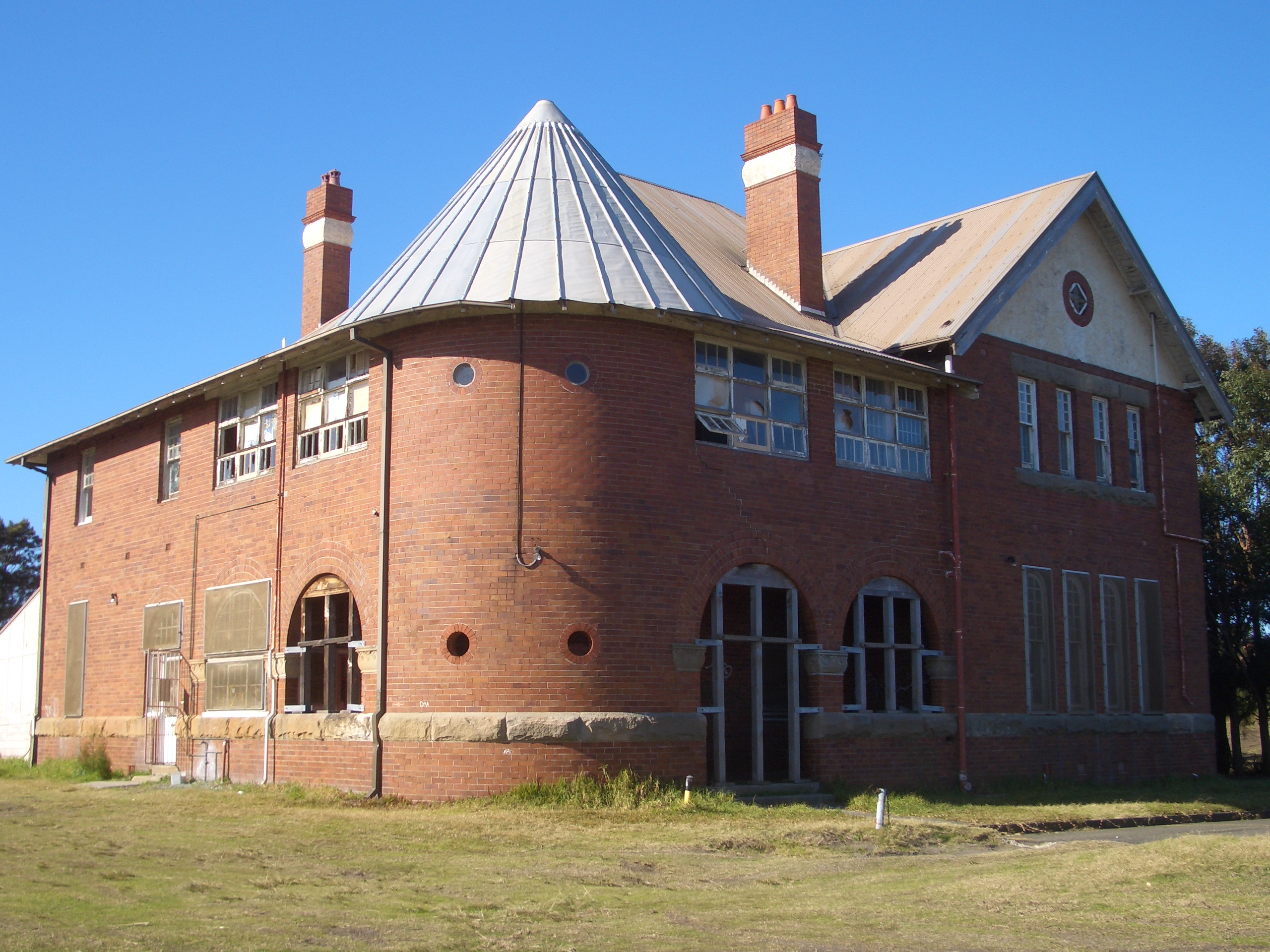
Yarra Bay House

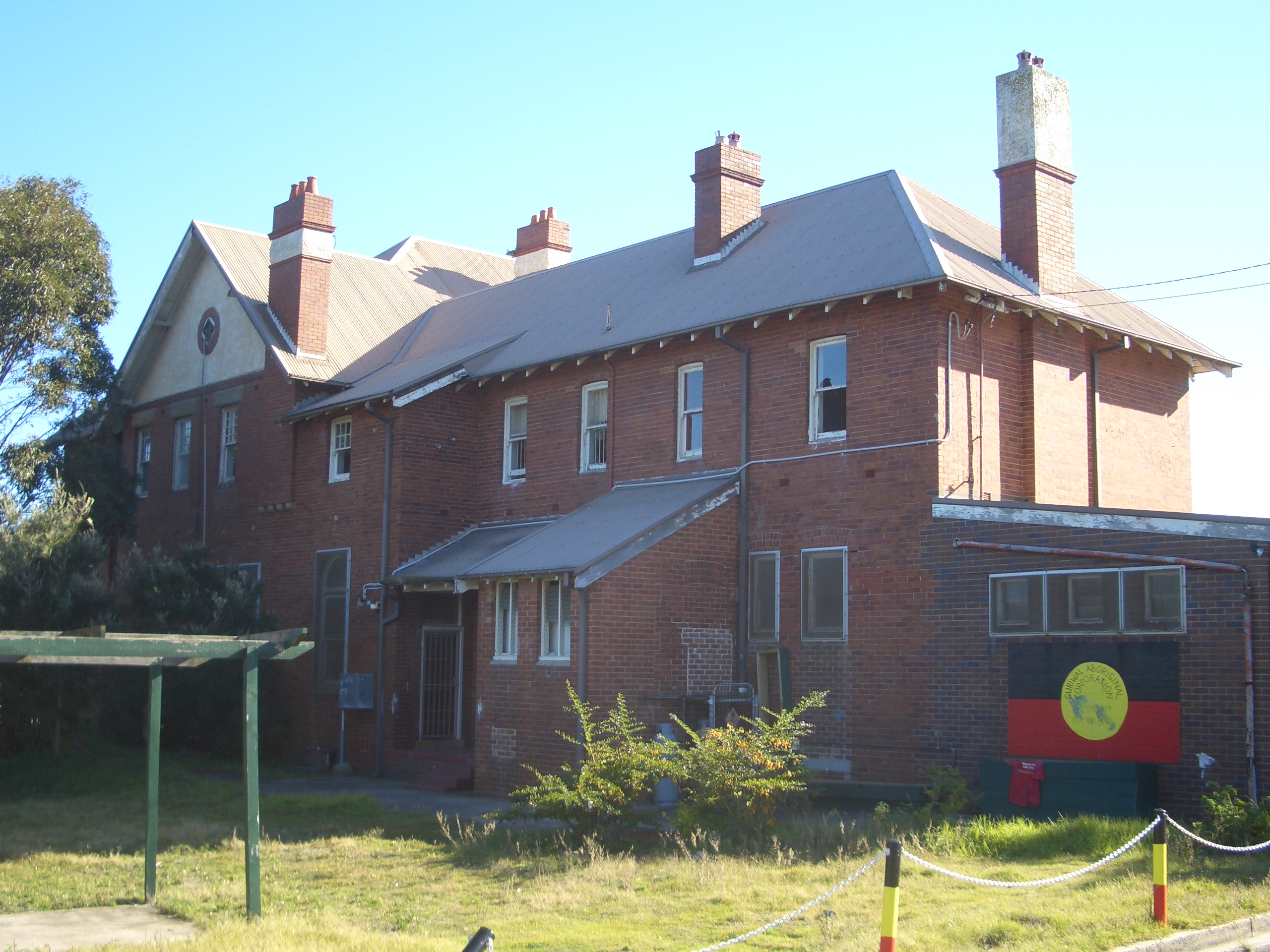
Yarra Bay House

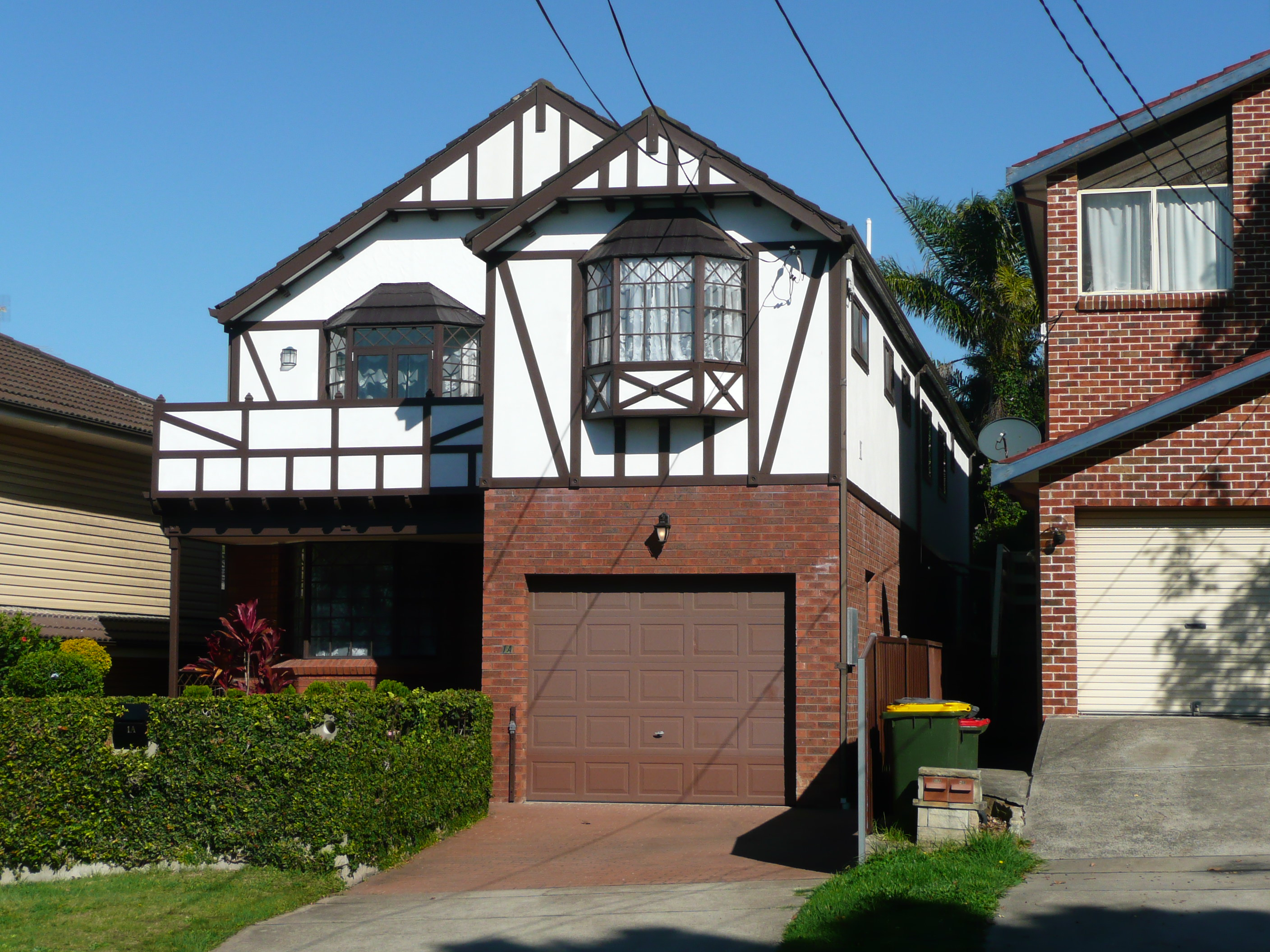
Home in Tudor Revival style, Yarra Road

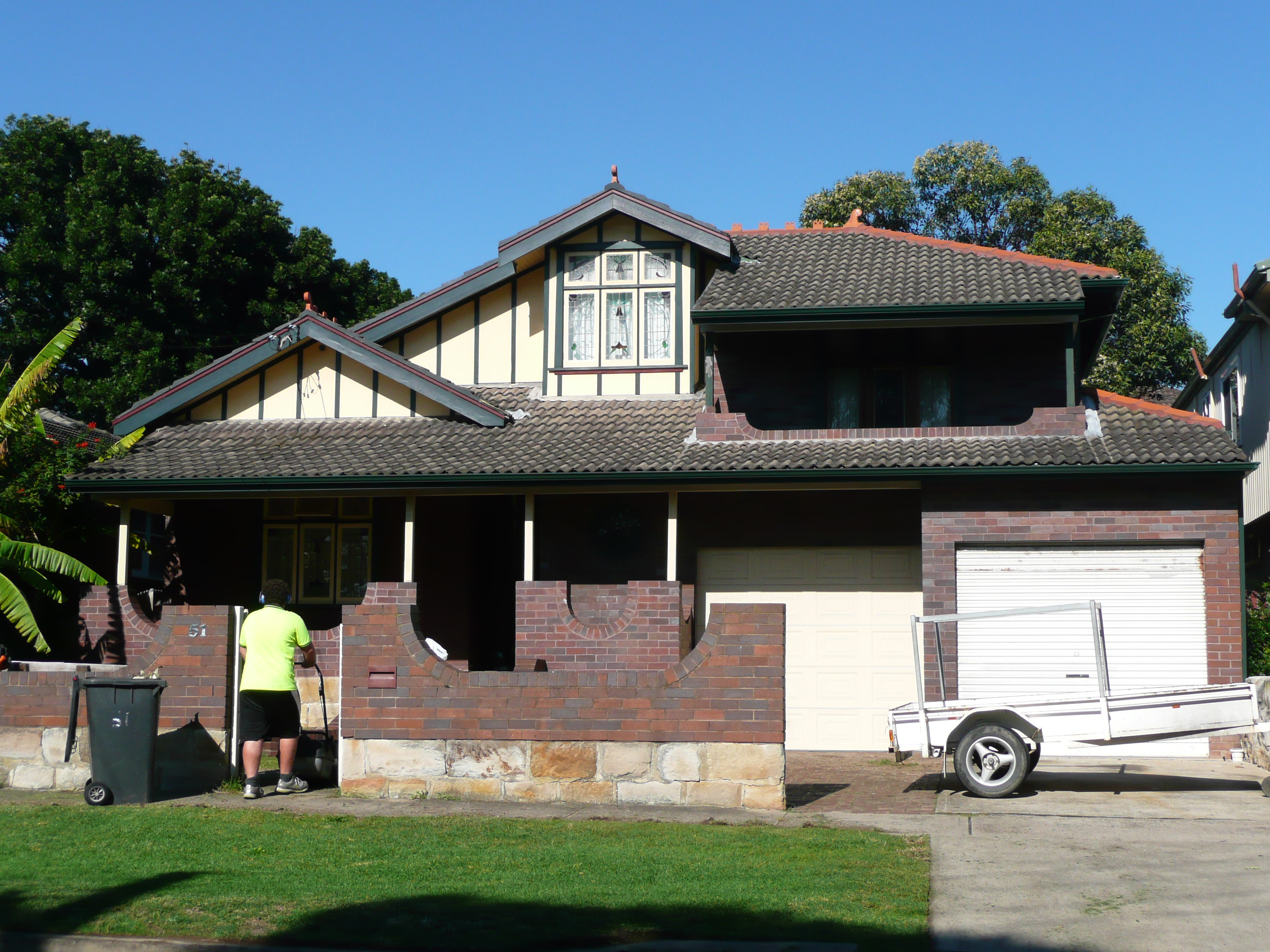
Home combining Federation Bungalow and California Bungalow styles, Yarra Road
