= Matraville Soldiers' Settlement Public School =

Public school in Sydney, Australia

Coordinates: 33.957951°S 151.239967°E

Matraville Soldiers' Settlement Public School is a public school that was founded in 1927 in Sydney, Australia.

== History ==
The school was first founded in 1926 by a group of WWI soldiers and their families who occupied land supplied by the government on which they built around 60 houses. The school developed and began to increase in size in 1956 in its original site in Menin Road. New class rooms were built on land in Knowles Avenue also from 1956 and particularly catered for the children from the newly built public housing estate and immigrant children from a migrant centre in Poziers Avenue, which was later demolished. The school captains were established in 1958.

The old school premises was eventually sub divided and sold off and the newer section of the school became what it is today. Only one building of the original school remains; this has been modified and divided into residential property. A memorial plaque is exhibited near the main entrance. The site of all other buildings and the playground has been covered with new residential structures.

== Notable alumni ==
- Australian rugby league footballer – Braith Anasta
- Former New South Wales Premier – Bob Carr

== See also ==
Matraville, New South Wales
