= Port Botany =

- Suburb
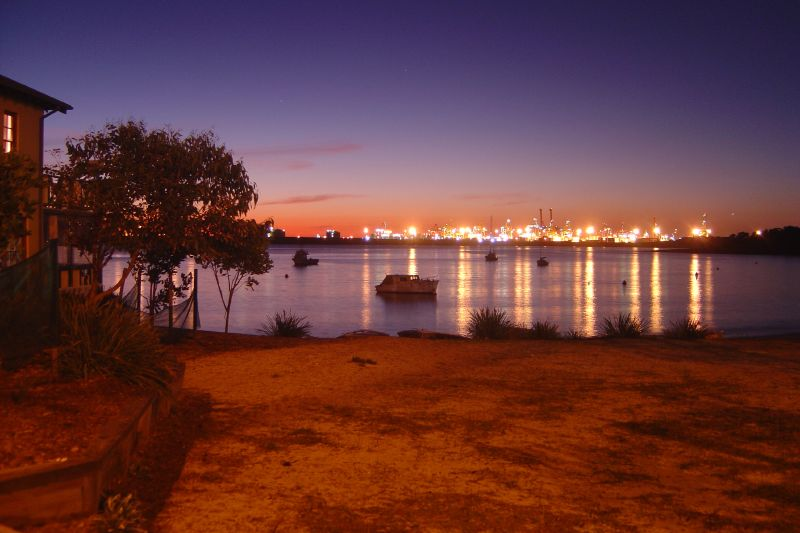
- View of Port Botany from La Perouse

- Interactive map of Port Botany
- Country: Australia
- State: New South Wales
- City: Sydney
- LGA: City of Randwick
- Location: 12 km (7.5 mi) south of Sydney CBD

Government
  - State electorate: Maroubra
  - Federal division: Kingsford Smith

Area
  - Total: 2,345 km^{2} (905 sq mi)
- Elevation: 2 m (6.6 ft)

Population
  - Total: 0 (SAL 2016)
- Postcode: 2036
Suburbs around Port Botany
Botany	Banksmeadow	Matraville
Sydney Airport	Port Botany	Phillip Bay
Botany Bay	Kurnell	La Perouse

Port Botany is a suburb in the Eastern Suburbs of Sydney, in the state of New South Wales, Australia. Port Botany is located 12 kilometres south of the Sydney central business district, in the local government area of the City of Randwick. Port Botany sits on the northern shore of Botany Bay, adjacent to the suburbs of Matraville, Banksmeadow and Phillip Bay.

== History ==
Botany Bay is where Lieutenant James Cook first landed on 29 April 1770, when navigating his way up the east-coast of Australia on his ship, the Endeavour. The ship's English naturalist Joseph Banks and Swedish botanist Daniel Solander spent several days on shore collecting vast numbers of previously unknown specimen. Cook's journals first referred to the bay as Sting Rays' Harbour, then later Botanist Bay and finally both these names were crossed out and replaced with Botany Bay. The suburb name comes from the bay it stands on.

== Landmarks ==
Molineaux Point features views to La Perouse and Kurnell. A cairn and plaque here commemorates the sister ports relationship between Sydney Ports Corporation and Yokkaichi Port Authority, Mie Japan. The revetment wall is called Banks Wall after Sir Joseph Banks.

== Commercial area ==
Port Botany is a major commercial area that is serviced by road and rail networks, together with Sydney's nearby international and domestic airports. The two Container Terminal facilities are complemented by a bulk liquids facility and an adjacent bulk liquids storage and distribution complex.

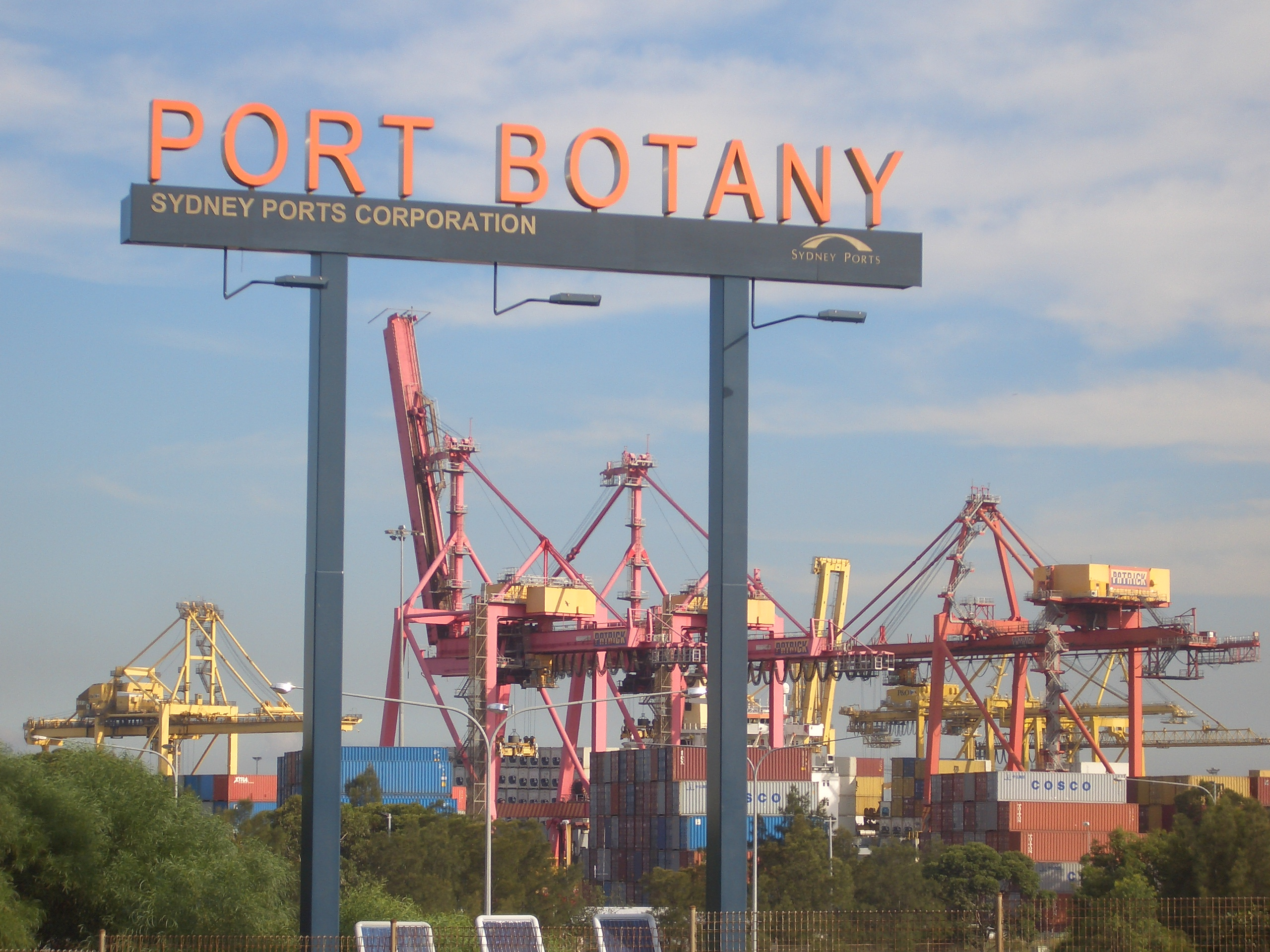
Sydney Ports Corporation

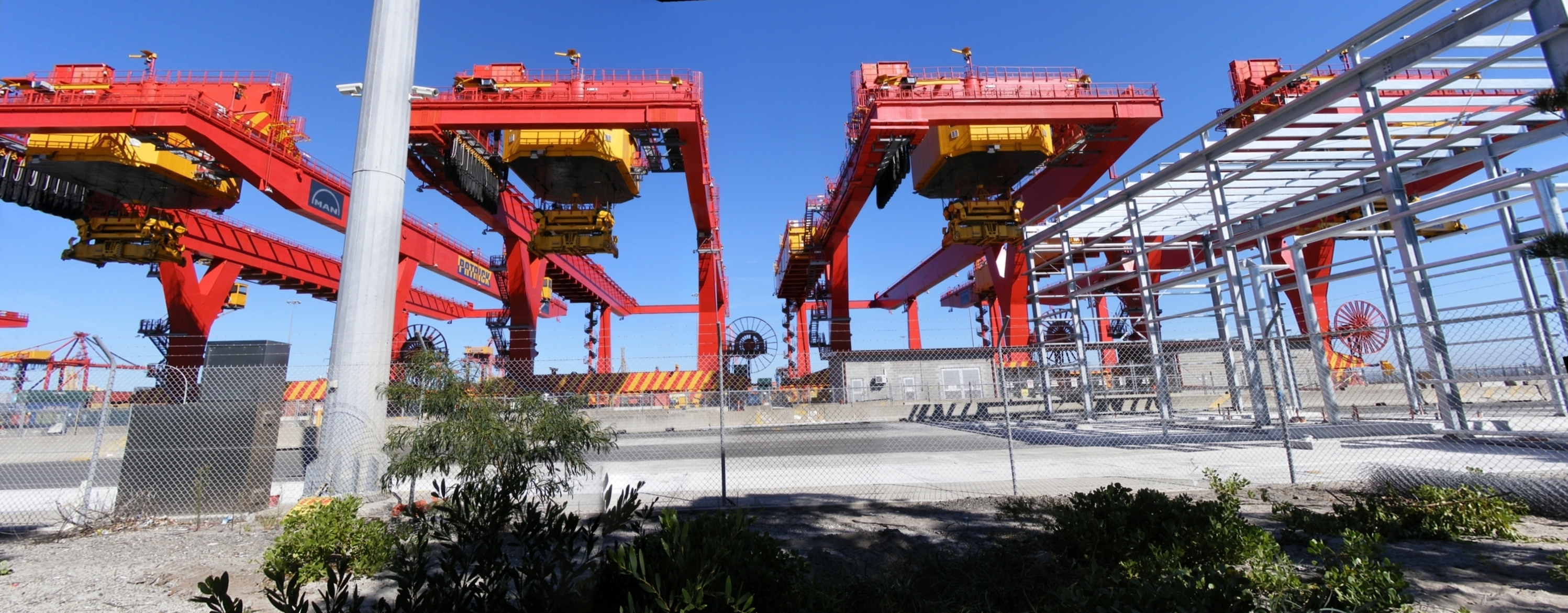
Shipping container cranes

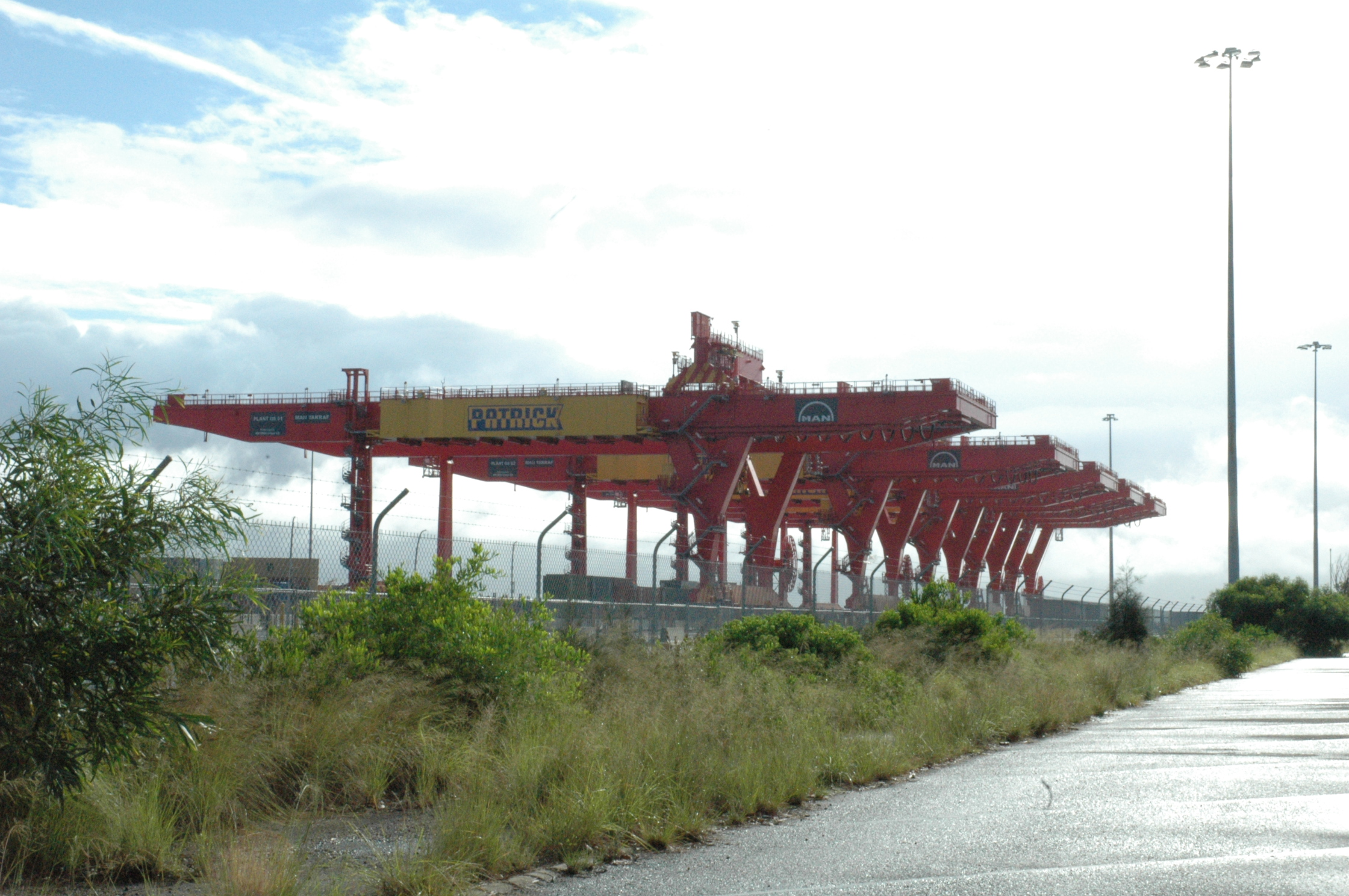
Patrick Corporation container cranes

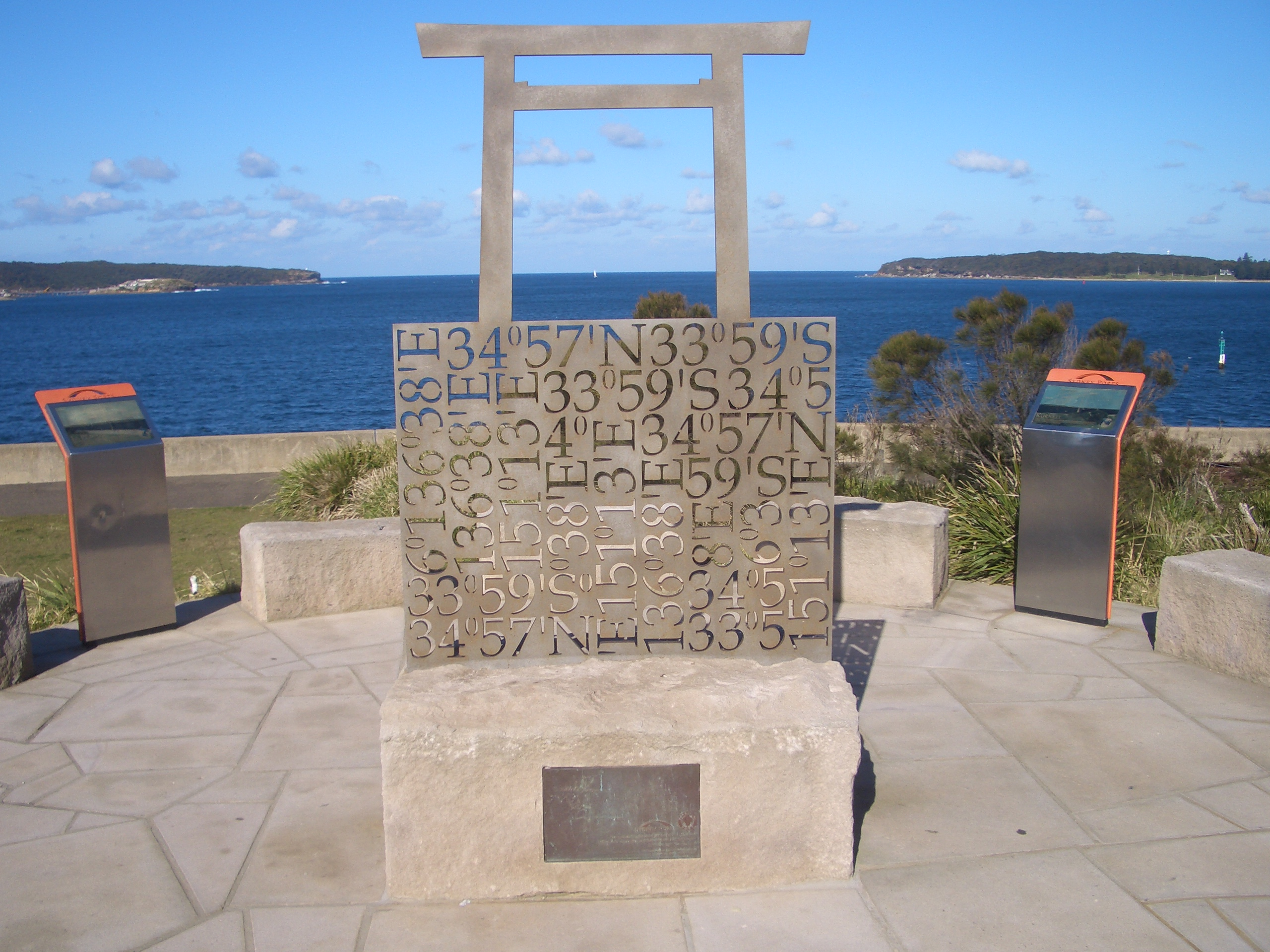
Molineaux Point
