= Matraville =

- Suburb
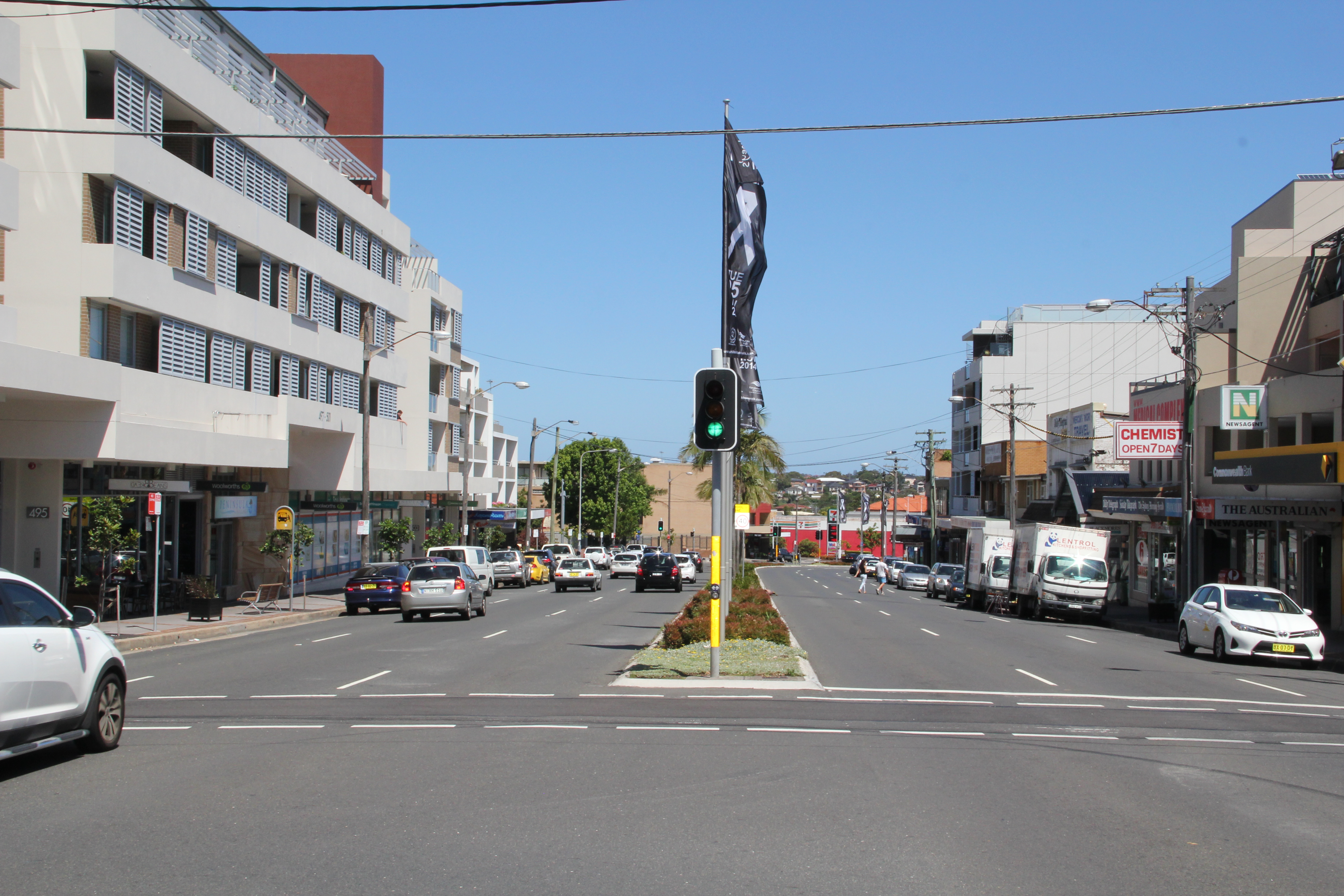
- Matraville town centre

- Interactive map of Matraville
- Country: Australia
- State: New South Wales
- City: Sydney
- LGA: City of Randwick
- Location: 9 km (5.6 mi) south-east of Sydney CBD
- Established: 1904

Government
  - State electorate: Maroubra
  - Federal division: Kingsford Smith
- Elevation: 25 m (82 ft)

Population
  - Total: 9,925 (2021 census)
- Postcode: 2036
Suburbs around Matraville
Hillsdale	Eastgardens	Maroubra
Banksmeadow	Matraville	Malabar
Port Botany	Phillip Bay	Chifley

Matraville is located in the Eastern Suburbs of Sydney, in the state of New South Wales, Australia. It is approximately 9 km (6 mi) by road south-east of the Sydney central business district, in the local government area of the City of Randwick.

== History ==
Matraville is named in honour of James Matra (1746–1806), an American sailor and diplomat, who was a midshipman on the voyage by Captain James Cook to Botany Bay in 1770. Matra was born in New York, but later settled in England. Matra had walked over the area with Cook and his close friend, botanist Joseph Banks. Matra had proposed to the British government that it establish a colony at Botany Bay in 1783, and settle dispossessed American Loyalists who had to leave the United States after the American War of Independence. Matra offered to be its 'Conductor and Governor'. The Pitt administration concurred with Matra's proposal but declined to offer him the government of the intended colony. Instead he was given the post of Consul at Tangier, where he remained until his death in 1806.

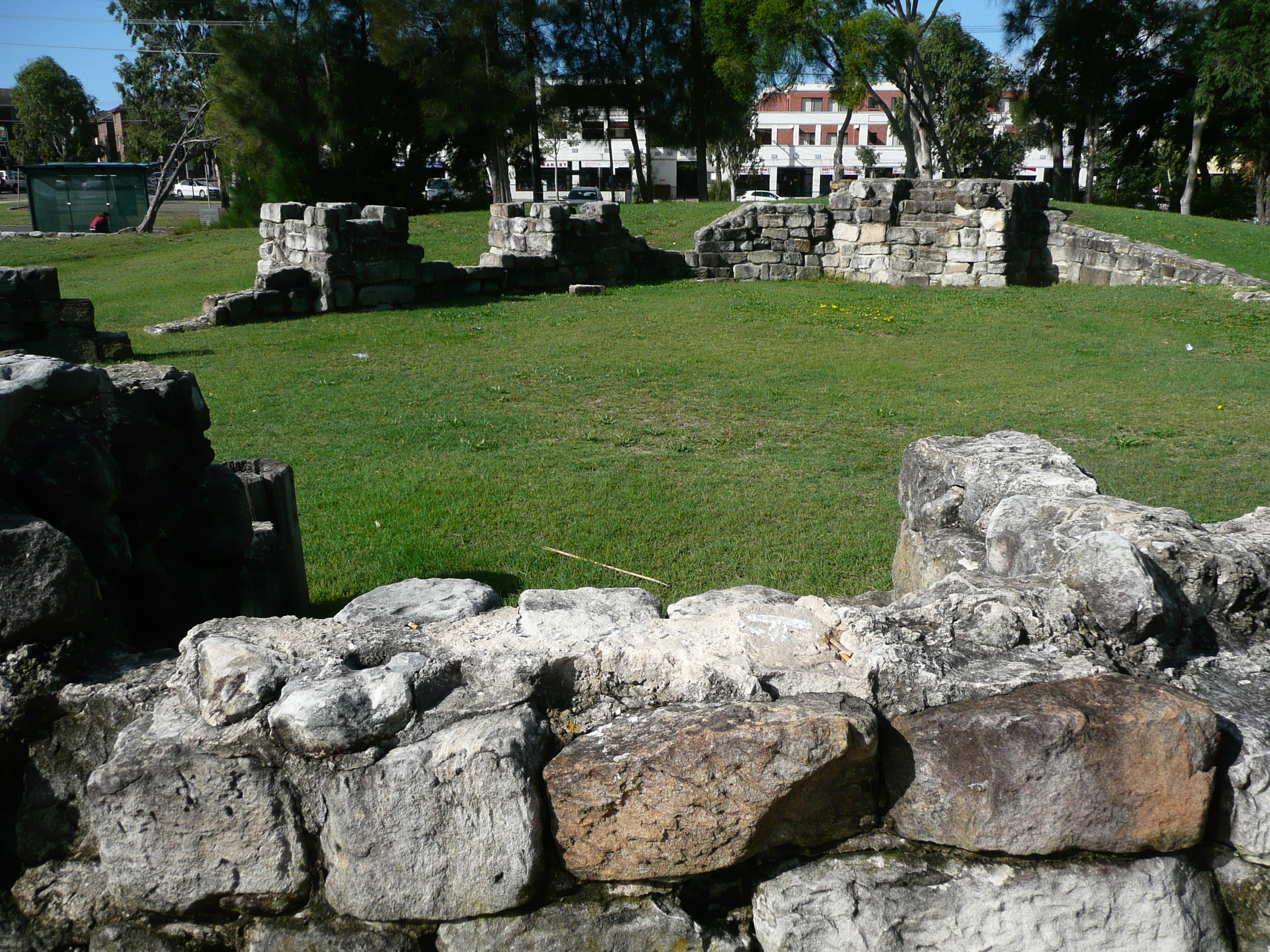
Sandstone wall at the site of the soldiers' settlement

== Landmarks ==
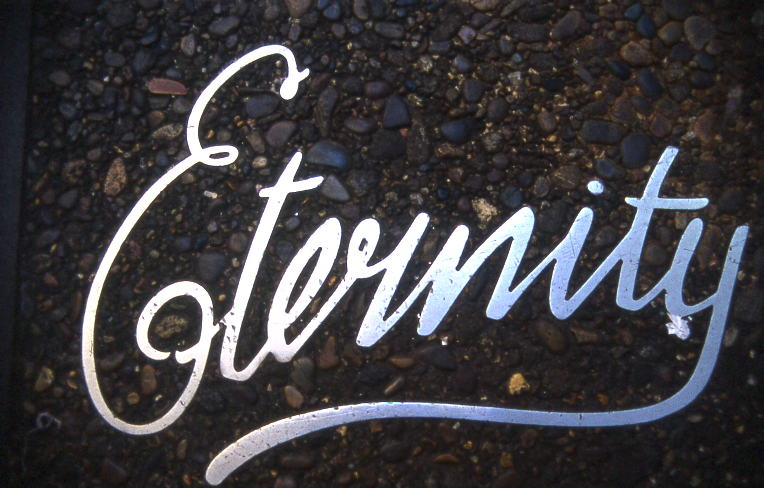
Copy of the Eternity sign Arthur Stace used to write around Sydney

Landmarks include Heffron Park, a large reserve bordering Maroubra, formerly the site of a naval stores base in World War II. Eastern Suburbs Memorial Park sits along the southern border of the suburb and incorporates Botany Cemetery, Eastern Suburbs Crematorium and Pioneer Park. Arthur Stace, known in Sydney as Mr Eternity, is buried at Botany Cemetery. He was famous for his practice of writing the word Eternity all over Sydney during the fifties and sixties.

== Churches ==
Matraville is home to St Agnes Catholic Church and Matraville Baptist Church. Matraville also has a large Jehovah's Witness congregation with a Kingdom Hall.

== Schools ==
There are three primary schools, one public and one Catholic and Matraville Sports High School and Matraville Public School. A child care centre and preschool is also in the suburb. Matraville Soldiers Settlement School previously had a separate Infants and Primary School which are now combined into one larger school following the acquisition of park land at Finucane Crescent.

== Transport ==
Matraville is located 9 km (6 mi) from Sydney CBD and 3 km (2 mi) along Bunnerong Road from Kingsford town centre.

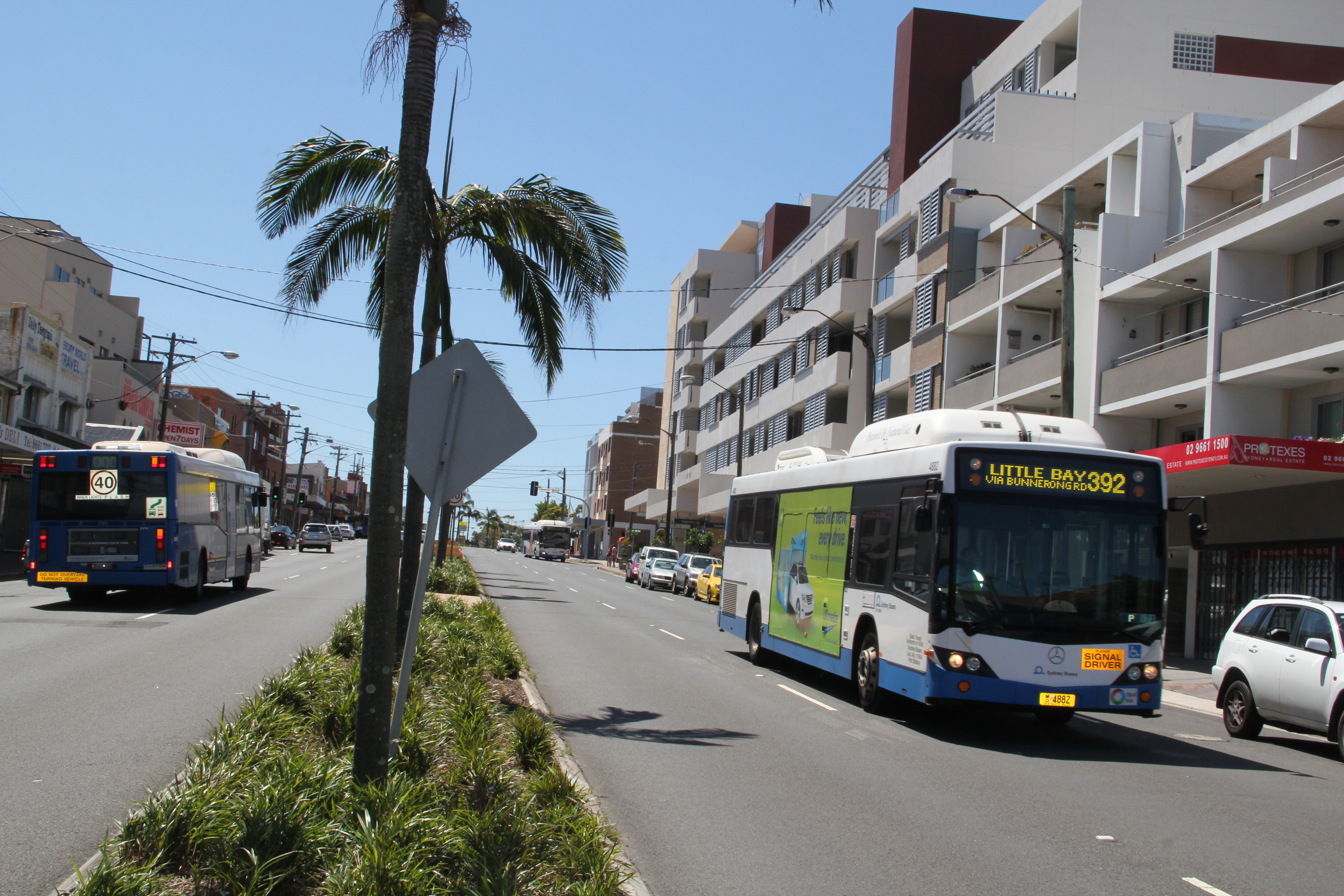
Bunnerong Road, Matraville

== Demographics ==
According to the 2021 census, the population of Matraville was 9,925: 48.2% male and 51.8% female. The median age of the Matraville population was 42 years of age, 2 years above the Australian median. In Matraville, 51.1% of households were made up of couples with children, compared with 37.9% in Randwick City. In Matraville, of all households, 73.8% were family households and 22.8% were single person households. 81.3% of households had at least one person access the internet from the dwelling.

In Matraville, 60% of people were born in Australia. The most common other countries of birth were England 3.5%, China (excludes SARs and Taiwan) 2.5%, New Zealand 2.0%, Indonesia 1.8% and Ireland 1.6%. Aboriginal and Torres Strait Islander people made up 3.3% of Matraville's population.

== Notable people ==
- Michael Atherton, emeritus professor and composer-performer attended Matraville High School 1965–1966
- Bob Carr, Foreign minister of Australia and former Premier of New South Wales. The first dux of Matraville High School in 1964
- Mark Ella, Glen Ella and Gary Ella Former Australian international rugby-playing brothers
- Mahroot, Indigenous Australian identity of the local Kamaygal people from the early colonial period
- David Warner, former Australian international cricketer
- Mike Whitney AM, former Australian Test cricketer and host of Channel 7's Sydney Weekender

== Gallery ==
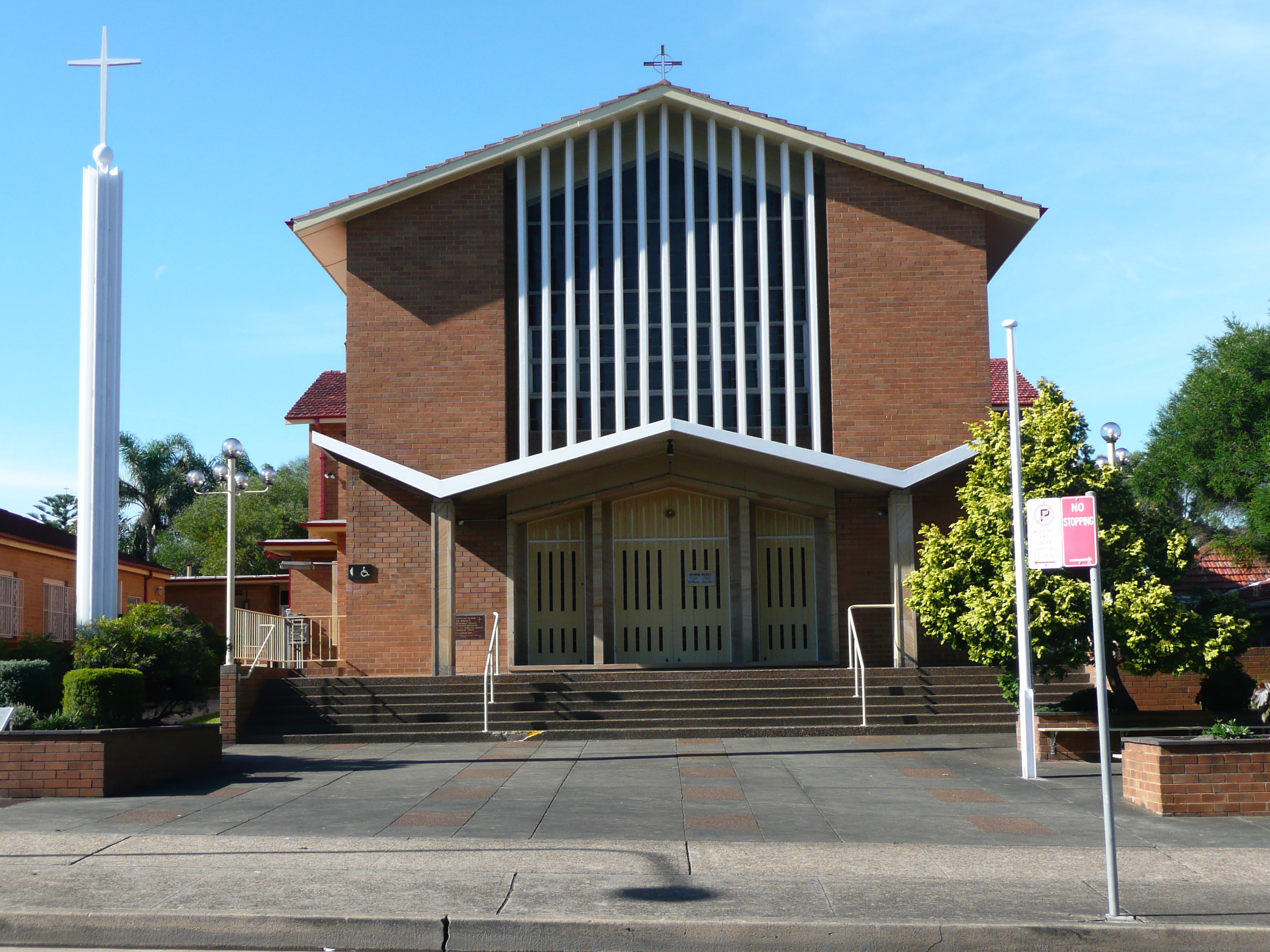
St Agnes's Catholic Church, Bunnerong Road

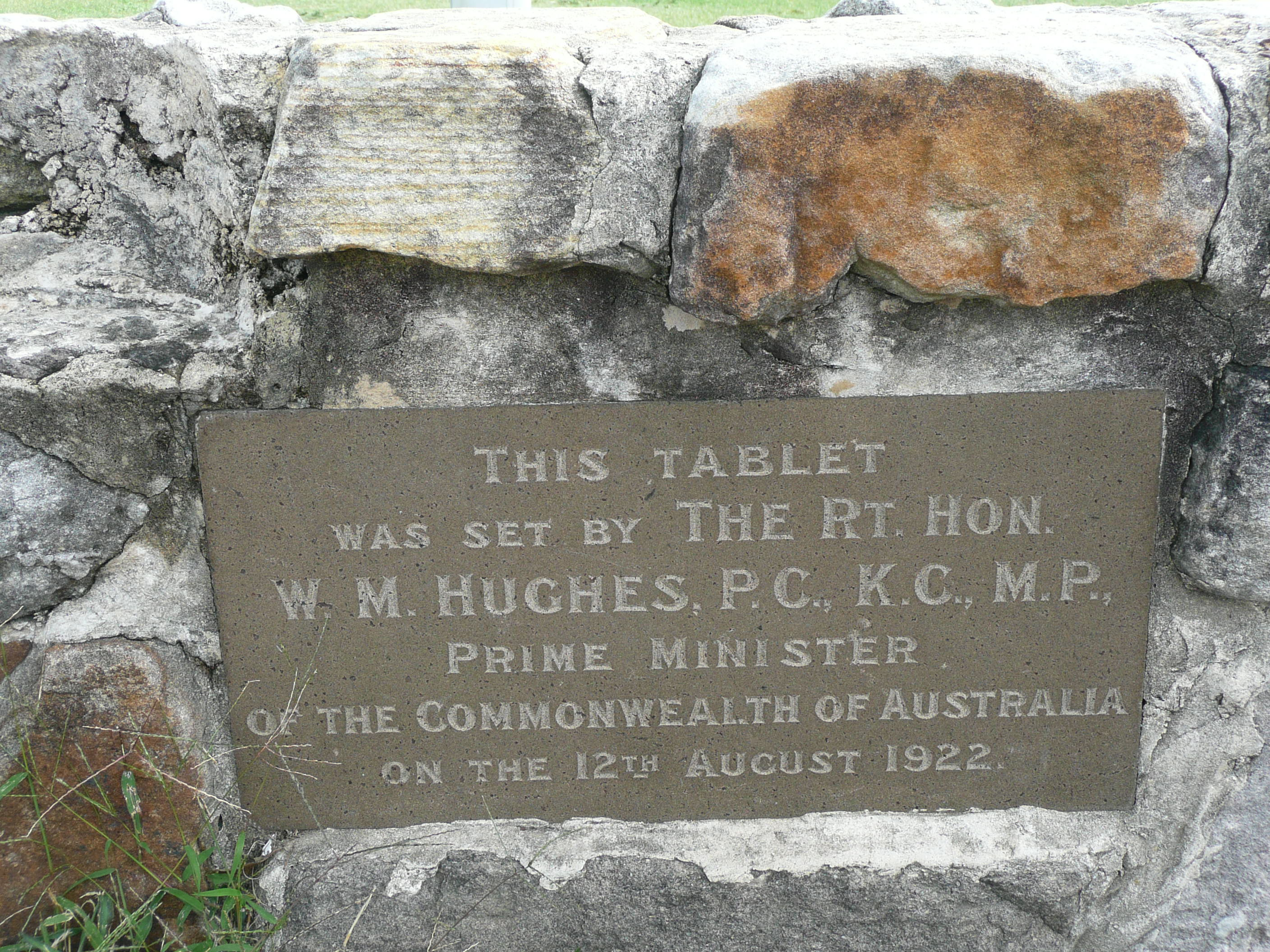
Foundation stone laid by Prime Minister Hughes at soldiers' settlement

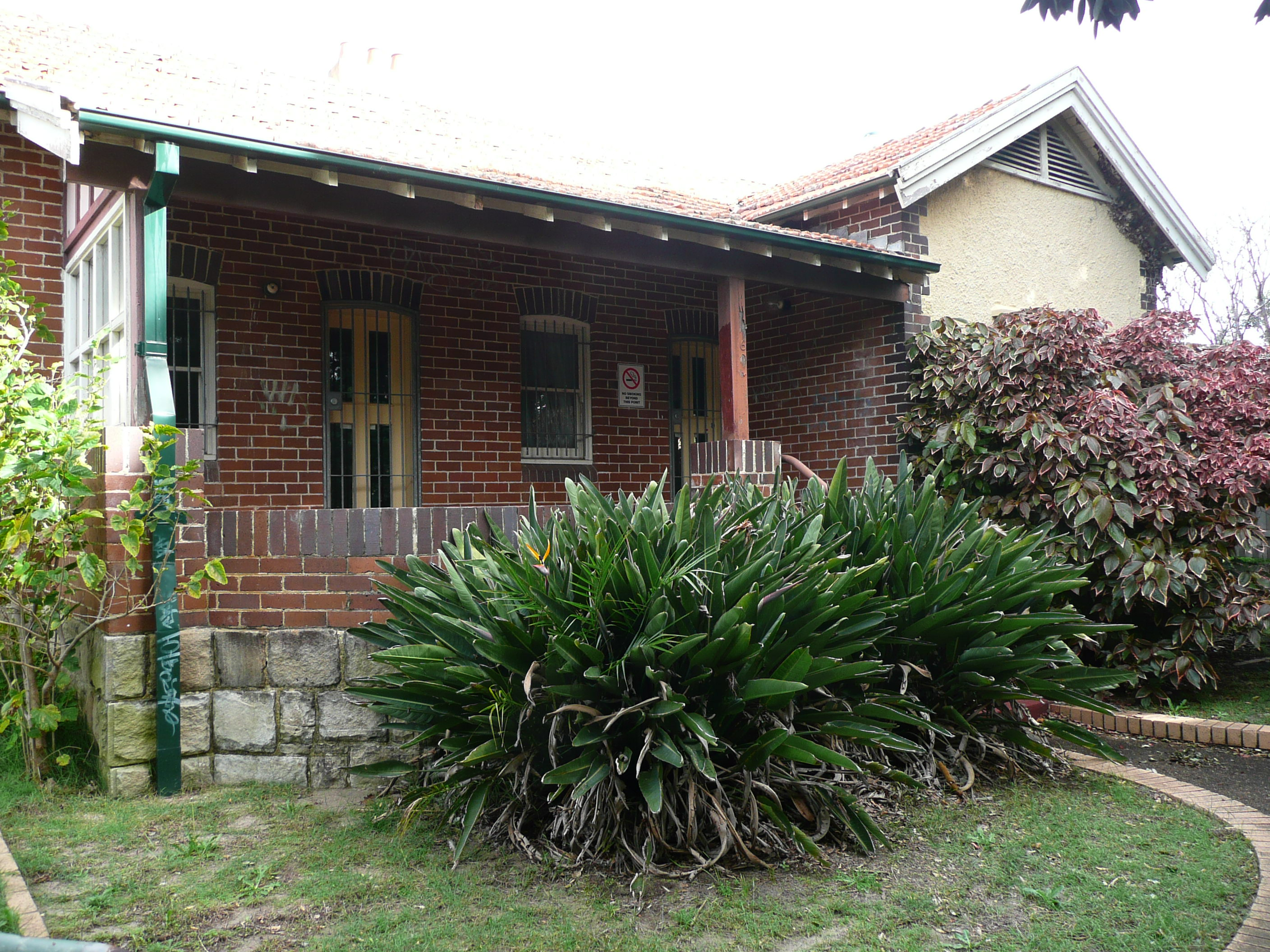
Cottage in Somme Way, the only surviving cottage from the soldiers' settlement

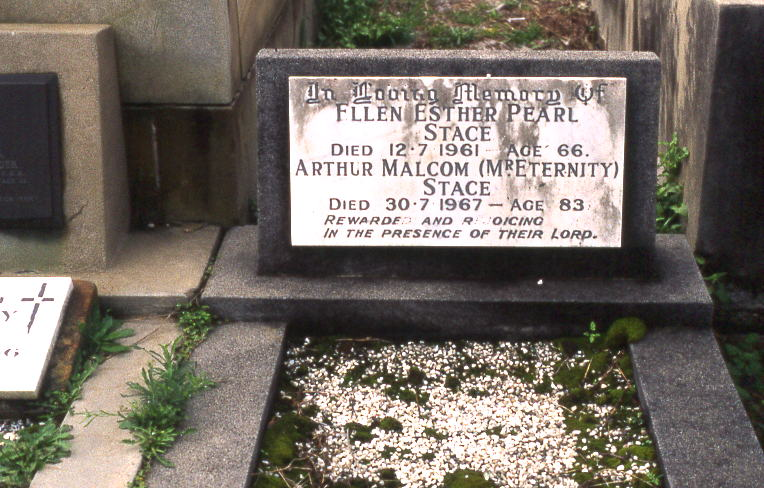
Grave of Arthur Stace, Botany Cemetery

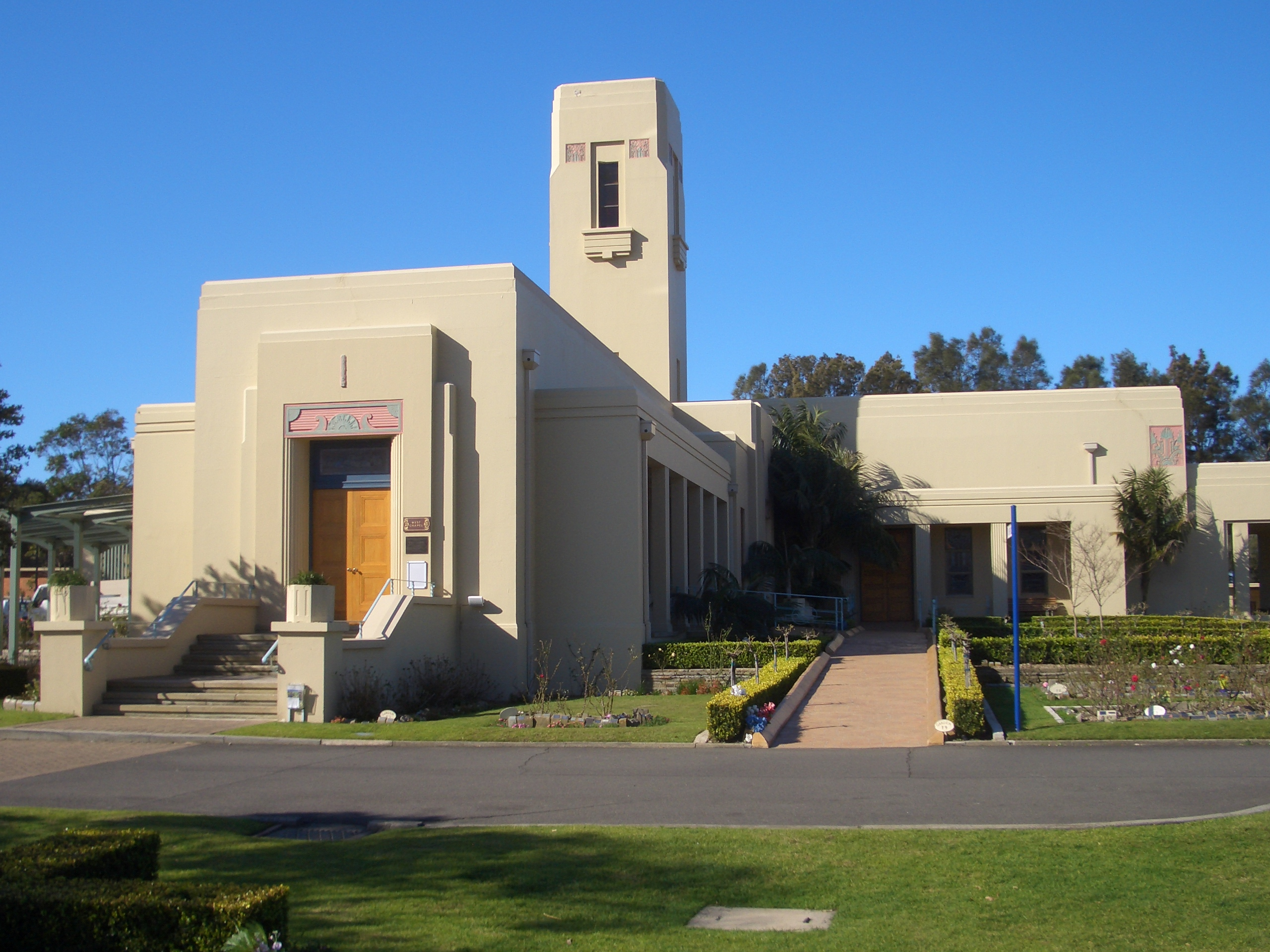
Eastern Suburbs Memorial Park
