= List of swim clubs =

Swimming clubs emerged with the development of swimming as a competitive sport in the early 1800s in England. By 1880, when the first national governing body, the Amateur Swimming Association, was formed, there were already over 300 regional clubs in operation across England.

The more notable swim clubs often have association with past Olympic athletes and future contenders, and vice versa.

Notable swim clubs around the world include:

== Australia ==
- Australian Paralympic Swim Team
- Australian Swim Team
- Bondi Icebergs Club
- Brighton Icebergers
- Commercial Swimming Club
- Melbourne Vicentre
- Randwick & Coogee Amateur Swimming Club

== United Kingdom ==
- City of Southampton Swimming Club
- Durham University Swimming Club
- Nottingham Leander Swimming Club
- Portsmouth Northsea Swimming Club
- West London Penguin Swimming and Water Polo Club

== United States ==
- Aquabombers
- Canyons Aquatic Club, founded in 1978, located in Santa Clarita, California
- Cincinnati Marlins
- Industry Hills Aquatic Club
- Irvine Novaquatics
- Mission Viejo Nadadores
- New Trier Swim Club
- North Baltimore Aquatic Club
- The Woodlands Swim Team, founded in 1975, based in Woodlands, Texas

== See also ==
- List of 10-meter diving platforms
- List of Australian surf lifesaving clubs
