= Newcastle Ocean Baths =

Sea bath in New South Wales, Australia

Coordinates: 32.9296°S 151.7909°E

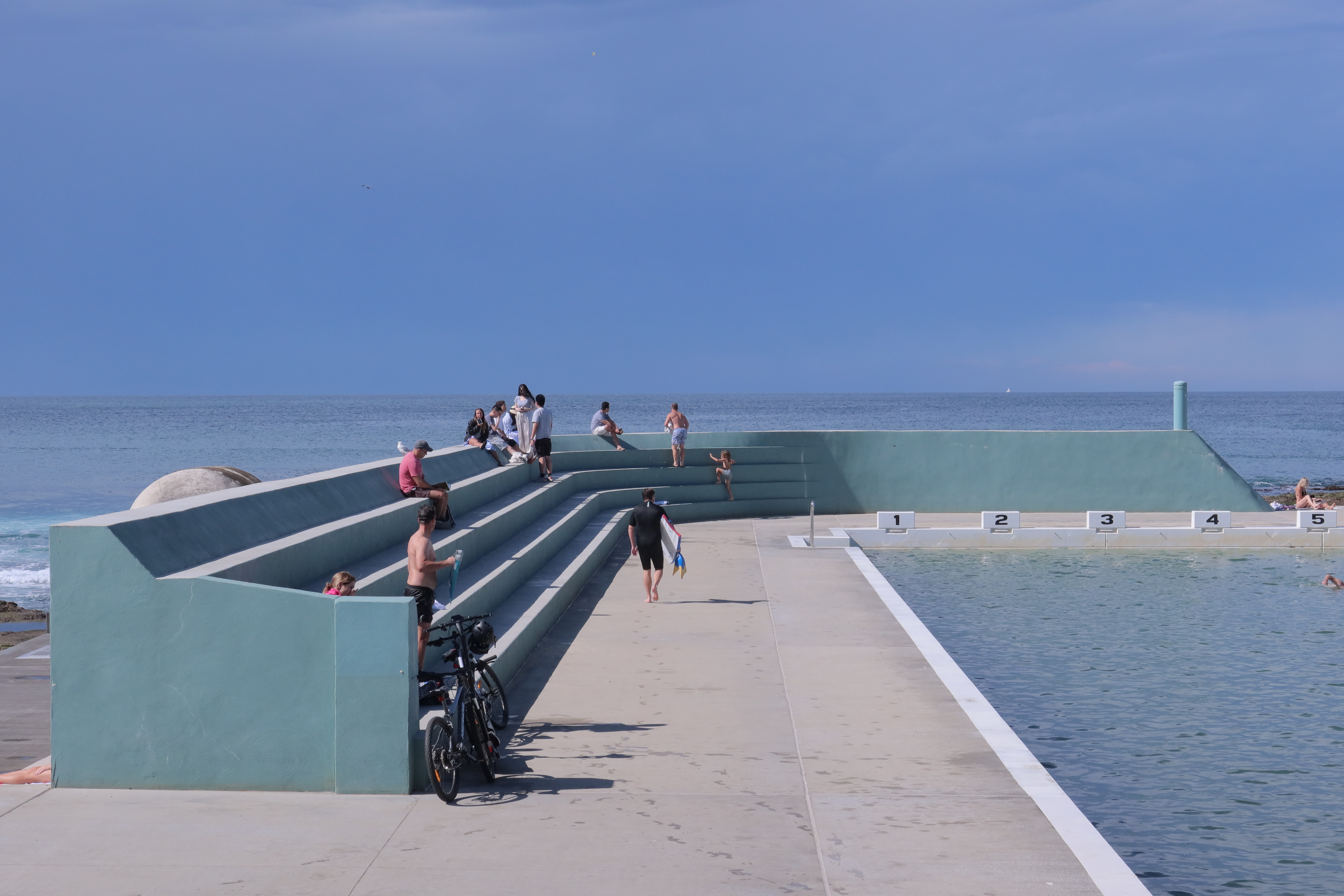
Concrete seating beside the main lap pool

Canoe Pool, a shallow wading pool

The Newcastle Ocean Baths are a sea bath in Newcastle, New South Wales. The site includes the main ocean baths, the pavilion and the Canoe Pool. The baths are known for architectural features such as the Stripped Classical / Art Deco facade and bleacher seating.

== History ==
Construction of the Newcastle Ocean Baths began in 1910 and they were in use before World War I. However, they were not formally opened until the 1920s. Construction of the pavilion began in 1922.

== See also ==
- Ocean pools in Australia
- McIver Women's Baths
