= Wylie's Baths =

Heritage-listed tidal swimming pool in Sydney, New South Wales, Australia

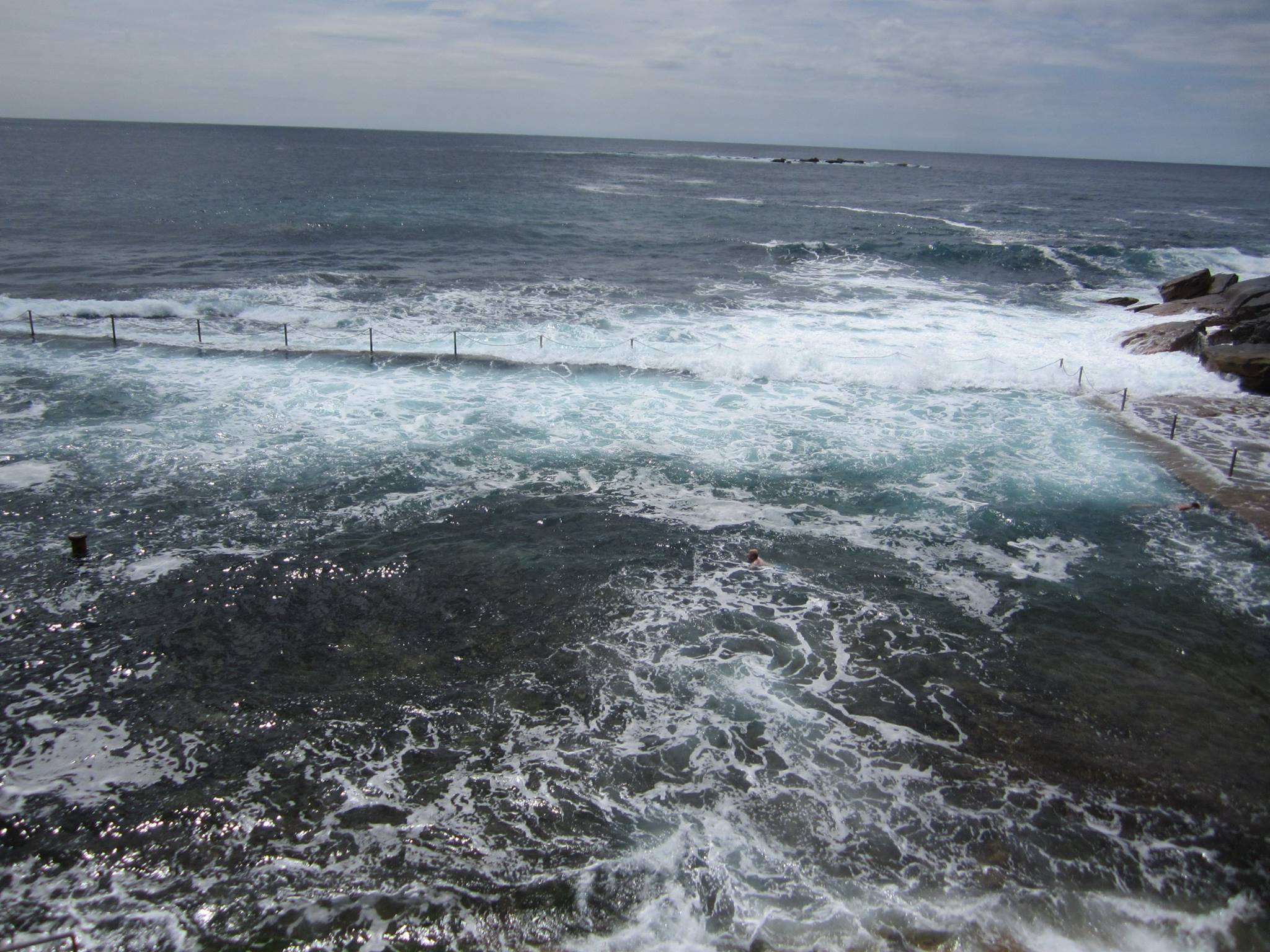
- Wylie's Baths, pictured in 2006, looking out to the Tasman Sea
- Interactive map of Wylie's Baths
- Former names: Sunset Pool
- Location: 4B Neptune Street, Coogee Beach, Sydney, New South Wales, Australia, 2034
- Coordinates: 33°55′32″S 151°15′34″E
- Owner: Randwick City Council
- Operator: Randwick & Coogee Amateur Swimming Club; Coogee Surf Life Saving Club
- Type: Tidal pool
- Dimensions: Olympic-size pool; Length: 50 yards (46 m); Width: 30 metres (98 ft); Depth: 0.5 to 1.6 metres (1 ft 8 in to 5 ft 3 in)

Construction
- Opened: 1907; 119 years ago

Website
- www.wylies.com.au

Designations

New South Wales Heritage Register
- Official name: Wylie's Baths; Wylies Baths; Sunset Pool (1959–1978)
- Type: State heritage (complex / group)
- Criteria: a., b., c., d., e., f., g.
- Designated: 14 November 2003
- Reference no.: 01677
- Type: Swimming pool – tidal
- Category: Recreation and entertainment
- Builders: Henry Alexander Wylie

Wylie's Baths is a heritage-listed tidal swimming pool located near Coogee Beach, in the Eastern Suburbs of Sydney, New South Wales, Australia. The baths are noted for holding the first Australian Swimming Championships and for being one of the first swimming baths for mixed gender swimming in Australia. The Baths were added to the New South Wales State Heritage Register on 14 November 2003 and are also classified by the National Trust of Australia.

Wylie's Baths was built in 1907 by Henry Wylie, the father of Mina Wylie who, along with Fanny Durack, were Australia's first female Olympic swimming representatives, and Australia's first female gold and silver medallists respectively. From 1959 to 1978, the baths were called Sunstrip Pool. Owned by the City of Randwick, Wylie's Baths is run by a management committee established in 1978 comprising representatives from South Maroubra Dolphins Winter Swimming Club, Randwick & Coogee Amateur Swimming Club, the Coogee-Randwick RSL Diggers Swimming Club, and the Coogee Surf Life Saving Club.

== History ==
=== Indigenous history ===
Aboriginal people are believed to have inhabited the Sydney region for at least 20,000 years. The population of Aboriginal people between Palm Beach and Botany Bay in 1788 has been estimated to have been 1500. Those living south of Port Jackson to Botany Bay were the Cadigal people who spoke Dharug, while the local clan name of Maroubra people was "Muru-ora-dial". By the mid nineteenth century the traditional owners of this land had typically either moved inland in search of food and shelter, or had died as the result of European disease or confrontation with British colonisers. Few religious beliefs of the people were recorded, but oral traditions have ensured that some have been carried on. Thus it is thought that the Wylie's Baths location may have been a special place for women's business, possibly associated with birthing, although more research needs to be done to confirm this. There is now a sizable community of Aboriginal people living in the Randwick municipality, many to the south of Coogee in La Perouse.

=== Colonial history ===
One of the earliest land grants in this area was made in 1824 to Captain Francis Marsh, who received 4.9 hectares (12 acres) bounded by the present Botany and High Streets, Alison and Belmore Roads. In 1839 William Newcombe acquired the land north-west of the present town hall in Avoca Street.

Randwick takes its name from the town of Randwick, Gloucestershire, England. The name was suggested by Simeon Pearce (1821–86) and his brother James. Simeon was born in the English Randwick and the brothers were responsible for the early development of both Randwick and its neighbour, Coogee. Simeon had come to the colony in 1841as a 21 year old surveyor. He built his Blenheim House on the 1.6 hectares (4 acres) he bought from Marsh, and called his property "Randwick". The brothers bought and sold land profitably in the area and elsewhere. Simeon campaigned for construction of a road from the city to Coogee (achieved in 1853) and promoted the incorporation of the suburb. Pearce sought construction of a church modelled on the church of St. John in his birthplace. In 1857 the first St Jude's stood on the site of the present post office, at the corner of the present Alison Road and Avoca Street.

Randwick was slow to progress. The village was isolated from Sydney by swamps and sandhills, and although a horse-drawn omnibus was operated by a man named Grice from the late 1850s, the journey was more a test of nerves than a pleasure jaunt. Wind blew sand over the track, and the bus sometimes became bogged, so that passengers had to get out and push it free. From its early days Randwick had a divided society. The wealthy lived elegantly in large houses built when Pearce promoted Randwick and Coogee as a fashionable area. But the market gardens, orchards and piggeries that continued alongside the large estates were the lot of the working class. Even on the later estates that became racing empires, many jockeys and stablehands lived in huts or even under canvas. An even poorer group were the immigrants who existed on the periphery of Randwick in a place called Irishtown, in the area now known as The Spot, around the junction of St.Paul's Street and Perouse Road. Here families lived in makeshift houses, taking on the most menial tasks in their struggle to survive.

In 1858 when the NSW Government passed the Municipalities Act, enabling formation of municipal districts empowered to collect rates and borrow money to improve their suburb, Randwick was the first suburb to apply for the status of a municipality. It was approved in February 1859, and its first Council was elected in March 1859.

Randwick had been the venue for sporting events, as well as duels and illegal sports, from the early days in the colony's history. Its first racecourse, the Sandy Racecourse or Old Sand Track, had been a hazardous track over hills and gullies since 1860. When a move was made in 1863 by John Tait, to establish Randwick Racecourse, Simeon Pearce was furious, especially when he heard that Tait also intended to move into Byron Lodge. Tait's venture prospered, however and he became the first person in Australia to organise racing as a commercial sport. The racecourse made a big difference to the progress of Randwick. The horse-drawn omnibus gave way to trams that linked the suburb to Sydney and civilisation. Randwick soon became a prosperous and lively place, and it still retains a busy residential, professional and commercial life.

Today, some of the houses have been replaced by home units. Many European migrants have made their homes in the area, along with students and workers at the nearby University of New South Wales and the Prince of Wales Hospital.

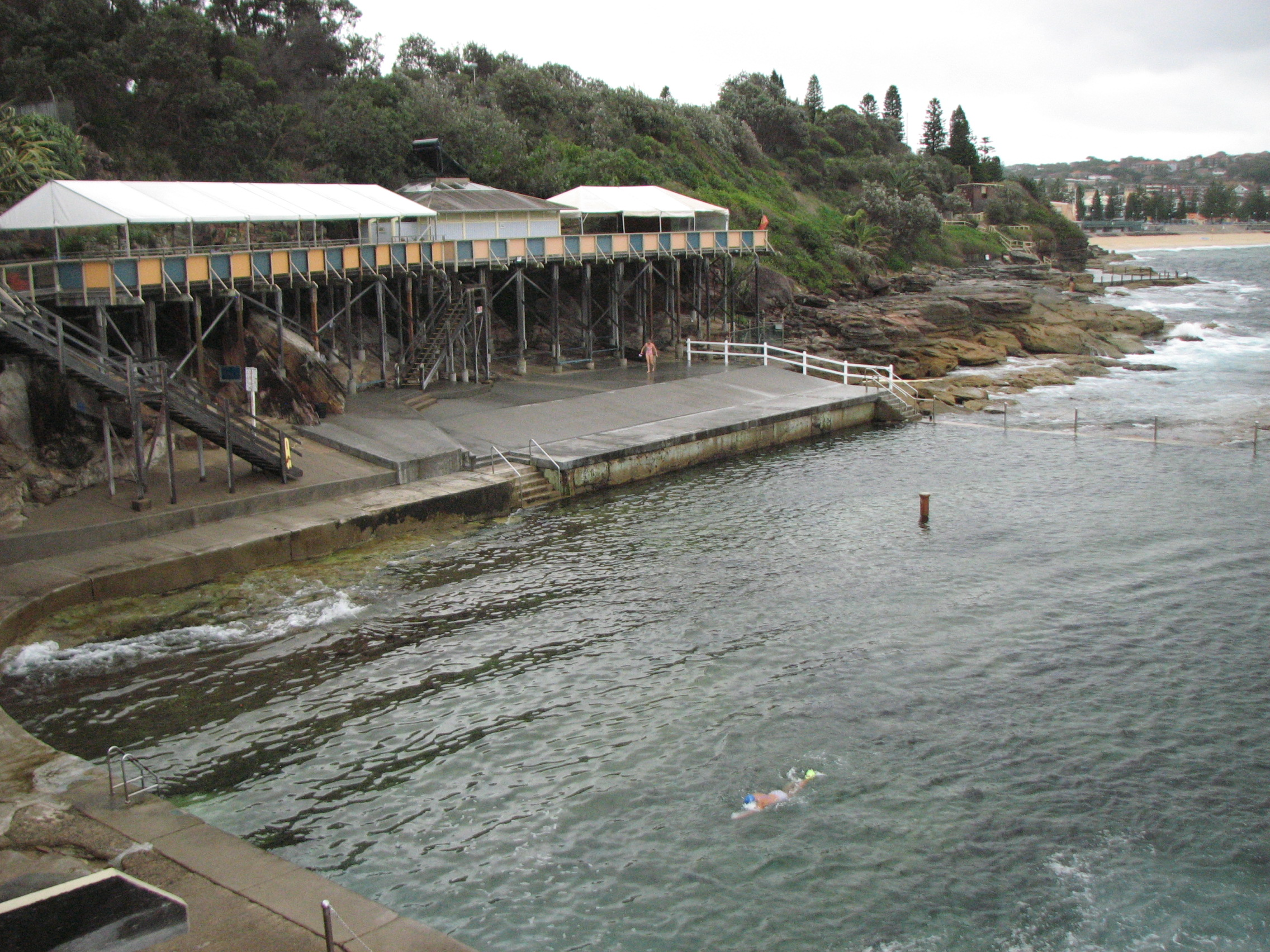
A view of the baths showing the covered sunbathing area

=== Coogee ===
Following the opening of the tram line to Coogee Bay in 1883, Coogee became a popular seaside resort. Coogee became well known for its beach and seaside entertainments, similar to Manly and Bondi. The Coogee Aquarium opened in December 1887 and included a ballroom and indoor swimming pool. Other beach amusements included swings, donkey rides, bandstand and an outdoor slide and toboggan rink. Later amusements included the Coogee Pleasure Pier built in 1928 (demolished in 1933), the shark net installed in 1929 (removed in 1939) and floodlights for night surfing.

The late nineteenth century also saw the development of swimming as a competitive sport, in contrast to "bathing" as a therapeutic activity. The first British amateur swimming association was formed in 1869, and the Balmain Swimming Club was formed in March 1884. In 1891 the NSW Amateur Swimming Association was formed by men's swimming clubs and in 1906 women swimmers formed their own association. Fred Cavill arrived in Sydney in 1879 and, with his sons, managed a number of harbourside pools (for example, Lavender Bay) and helped to popularise competitive and long-distance swimming. His son, Dick Cavill introduced the crawl from the Solomon Islands which revolutionised swimming and another son, Sydney Cavill developed the butterfly stroke.

A number of Sydney ocean and harbourside pools date from the late nineteenth and early twentieth centuries, prior to the main construction phase of ocean and harbour pools in the 1930s and 1940s. Examples includes the Dawn Fraser Pool (1882), Bondi Beach Pool (c. 1892), the original Manly Cove Baths (c.1890), the original Brighton Baths (c.1900), Watsons Bay Baths (c.1905) and Dee Why Rock Pool (c. 1915). Many of these pools were built as Olympic-sized pools with raised seating to cater for competitive swimming events. North of Wylie's Baths are two more rock pools: the Ross Jones Memorial Baths (built 1947) and the McIver Women's Baths. These occupy the site of a women's bathing spot since before 1876. The Women's Baths were built in 1886 and since 1922 have been managed by the Randwick Coogee Ladies Amateur Swimming Club, formed by Rose McIver and Mina Wylie. At the northern end of Coogee Beach is another rock pool: Giles Baths, which was built in 1902 for men only. By 1909 it was known as the Randwick Municipal Baths. While now in disrepair, the pool is still in use.

=== Wylie's Baths, 1900s–1959 ===
In the early 1900s Henry Alexander Wylie, a champion long-distance and under-water swimmer - and an amateur builder - obtained a lease for the area below the high water mark (the area above high water mark being Crown Reserve). In 1907 Wylie constructed the present ocean pool, which opened on 12 December 1907. It was originally fenced with a metal hand rail along the eastern edge. At some stage the original fence was replaced with a timber and metal rail which enclosed the pool on three sides. In 1912 Wylie constructed the high timber boardwalk that encloses two sides of the pool, and two change rooms. The deck was elevated by a post and beam construction in blackbutt timber. The posts were embedded into sockets cut into the sandstone cliff face and into the large rocks at the base of the cliff. Wylie also constructed a concrete diving tower on the eastern wall. There was a slippery dip into the pool on the north-western corner. At some stage a second diving tower was located on the southern end. Night bathing and picnicking became popular when Wylie erected three lamp posts along the northern edge and also strung lights across the pool. None of these structures remain today, although the concrete wall on the eastern edge is still thickened at the location of the demolished diving tower, and the concrete bases of the lamp posts can still be seen along the northern edge. At a later date Wylie extended the timber platform, considerably increasing the size of the change rooms at either end.

Entrance to the baths was from either Grant Reserve or Neptune Street. A fee was collected at the caretaker's cottage (which no longer exists) and swimming costumes issued. There were clothes lockers and possibly a refreshment outlet. The path wound down to timber stairs, which led to the change rooms (men's change room to the right and women's to the left).

Wylie's daughter was the Olympic swimmer Wilhelmina (Mina) Wylie (1891–1984) who grew up in South Coogee. Mina Wiley and Sarah (Fanny) Durack (1889–1956) were Australia's first two female Olympic swimming representatives when they competed in the Stockholm Olympics in 1912 (the first Olympic Games to admit female swimmers). In the 100-metre freestyle race, Durack won the gold medal and Wylie the silver medal. Mina Wiley competed in NSW and Australian championships from 1906 to 1934, winning a total of 115 NSW and Australian titles. As Australia's first Olympic female swimmers, Durack and Wylie inaugurated a long tradition of Australian female swimming champions.

Another well-known swimmer closely associated with Wylie's Baths is long-distance ocean swimmer, Des Renford (1927–1999). Renford swam the English Channel 19 times, was a Papal Knight and is featured in the NSW Hall of Champions at the State Sports Centre. He was a regular all-year-round swimmer at Wylie's where he was always conceded the best lane "on the wall" and was a member of the Wylie's Baths Trust and active in the management of the baths. Other swimmers of note associated with Wylie's Baths include Fanny Durack, Bob Parry and Paul Gately.

=== Sunstrip Pool (1959–1974) ===
On 5 November 1959 the lease for Wiley's Baths was transferred to Desmond Selby, who paid an annual rent of $500. Selby renamed the baths "Sunstrip Pool" and proceeded to upgrade the facilities. Selby removed the existing change rooms and increased the width of the boardwalk. He rebuilt the change rooms on a much smaller scale to provide a larger deck area, catering to the then fashion for sunbathing. At this stage the majority of the balustrade was fully boarded leaving only seven central sections with horizontal timber rails. The northern end of the boardwalk past the men's change room led to an open sitting area which became a popular picnic spot with views over Coogee Beach. Selby used tram parts to construct the building and installed hot showers. Both change rooms had cement roofing and wooden panelling and were externally painted in a checkerboard design in cream and blue. He also added a kiosk and store on the boardwalk.

=== Closure and re-opening of the Baths (1974–1978) ===
The buildings and pool were badly damaged in May 1974 by high seas and the pool was closed to the public. Another storm in 1977 caused further damage. In 1978 the baths were re-opened under the control of Randwick Municipal Council and reverted to the original name of Wylie's Baths. A Committee of Management was formed in September 1978, composed of representatives from the Randwick Council and various swimming clubs including the South Maroubra Dolphins (formed 1960), Randwick/ Coogee Amateur Swimming Club (formed 1896), Randwick Digger's Swimming Club (formed 1936) and Coogee Surf Life Saving Club.

=== Restoration of the Baths (1995) ===
In 1994 Randwick City Council resolved to repair the baths in response to public pressure. The successful tenderers were architects Allen Jack+Cottier, and restoration cost approximately $750,000. The work was completed early in 1995. In 1995 Allen, Jack+Cottier were awarded the NSW Greenway Award for Conservation by the Royal Australian Institute of Architects for their restoration of Wylie's Baths. The work included restoring the boardwalk and building new amenities blocks. The work was praised by the RAIA for its sensitivity in recovering the essence of the original baths. While the nature and style of the new work was clearly modern, it paid attention to the genius loci of the baths, adding a new layer to its history.

In 1996 Wylie's Baths Trust was established to manage the baths. The Trust consists of representatives of the four local swimming clubs, three local residents and a representative of the Randwick City Council.

=== Photography at the Baths ===
In recent years Wylie's Baths has become popular subject for both amateur and professional photographers. The dramatic cliff-hugging location of the baths is one aspect of their photographic appeal, as is the nostalgic seaside appeal of the wooden structures.

== Description ==
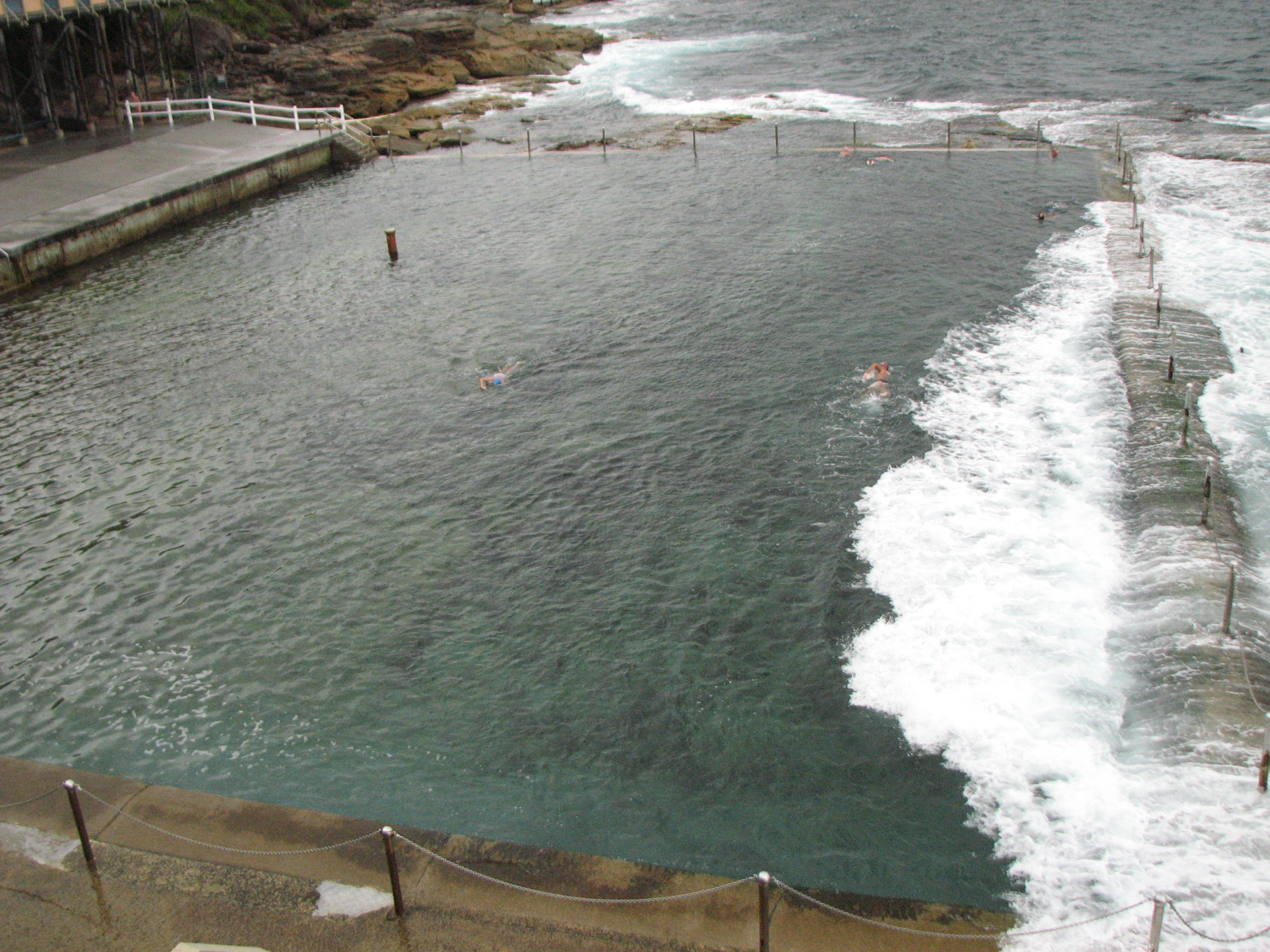
An overview of the pool boundary. Collywolly, 2019.

Wylie's Baths is located on the rocks at the southern end of Coogee Beach with an entrance off Neptune Street via Grant Reserve.

The pool is a rock and concrete pool 50 metres (160 ft) by 30 metres (98 ft) located on a natural rock shelf below the high tide mark with concrete walls around four sides. It provides a 50-yard (46 m) Olympic swimming length, and the depth of the pool varies from about 0.5 metres (1 ft 8 in) in the south-west corner to about 1.6 metres (5 ft 3 in) in the north-east corner. It is flushed twice daily by tidal action.

A high prominent timber boardwalk supported on timber posts wraps around the rock face on two sides of the pool and is clearly visible from Coogee Beach. Three sets of timber stairs lead down to the pool and rock shelf from the boardwalk. Amenities include men's and women's change rooms, kiosk and store. A steel fence runs around the northern and eastern sides of the pool, preventing access to the rocks.

=== Condition ===
As at 30 January 2003, following extensive restoration in 1995, the baths are in good condition. Wylie's Baths have been repaired and altered over time. These alterations have been necessary for maintenance especially given the harshness of the marine environment. These alterations have tended to preserve the original vernacular nature of the buildings and contributed to a sense of continuity in the built forms. The extensive restoration by Allen Jack+Cottier in 1995 was praised by the RAIA for its sensitivity in recovering of the original essence of the baths while upgrading and modernising the facilities. Following the 1995 restoration, Wylie's Baths are in good condition.

=== Modifications and dates ===
- 1907 Wylie's Baths opened on 12 December.
- 1912 high timber boardwork and change rooms constructed.
- 1959 change rooms replaced and boardwork increased in width, the familiar chequerboard walling added. Kiosk and store added.
- 1974 baths closed due to storm damage.
- 1977 further storm damage.
- 1991 stainless steel railing replaced old timber and chain railing.
- 1995 restoration work by Allen Jack+Cottier and baths re-opened.

== Heritage listing ==
As at 29 October 2004, Wylie's Baths is of State significance as one of NSW's oldest, most intact and best-known ocean swimming pools. It is also significant for the possibility that its location was special to Aboriginal women's business. Built in 1907, Wylie's Baths survives as a turn-of-the-century bathing complex, including an Olympic-size pool, elevated boardwalk, change rooms, kiosk and store, which evidences the development of sport and recreational facilities in Sydney. Wylie's Baths has been used for many competitive and recreational events, including amateur swimming clubs, fitness training, learn-to-swim classes as well as for general swimming, sunbathing and as a popular gathering place. Wylie's Baths has been held in great affection by generations of Sydneysiders.

Wylie's Baths is closely associated with the development of competitive swimming in Australia and with many swimmers of note, including Henry Alexander Wylie, Mina Wylie and Sarah (Fanny) Durack and Des Renford (long-distance ocean swimmer). It is one of a group of significant Sydney harbour and ocean pools associated with Australian swimming champions. Because of its association with the inaugural championship swimming of Mina Wiley and Fanny Durack at the 1912 Summer Olympics in Stockholm, Wylie's Baths is especially associated with Australian women's swimming.

Wylie's Baths is a well-known Sydney landmark, clearly visible from Coogee Beach and making use of its spectacular ocean setting. It is a popular subject with photographers and makes a large contribution to Coogee's identity as a seaside destination. The elevated timber boardwalk is architecturally striking and rare in Sydney. It is a good example of vernacular architecture and an ingenious design solution to the problem of providing amenities on a steep cliff face. Recent restoration of the baths by Allen Jack and Cottier in 1995 won the RAIA Greenway Medal for Conservation and was praised for its sensitivity in preserving the integrity of the original swimming pool complex.

Wylie's Baths may have significance and special meaning for Aboriginal groups, both pre and post-contact. There may be special associations with Aboriginal women and birthing but further research is required.

Wylie's Baths was listed on the New South Wales State Heritage Register on 14 November 2003 having satisfied the following criteria.

The place is important in demonstrating the course, or pattern, of cultural or natural history in New South Wales.

It is thought that the location for Wylie's Baths may be, or may be near a place that was special to Aboriginal women's business, possibly associated with birthing, although more research needs to be done to confirm this.

Wylie's Baths survives as one example of the numerous seaside attractions built at Coogee Beach around the turn of the twentieth century to attract visitors and day-trippers, with other attractions including an aquarium, pier, shark net, floodlighting etc. The construction of Wylie's Baths in 1907 coincided with an emerging interest in seaside baths in Sydney. Wylie's Baths forms a group with the three other ocean pools at Coogee Beach which date from the late nineteenth and early twentieth centuries: McIver Women's Baths (built 1886); Giles, former men's only (built 1902); and the Ross Jones Memorial Pool (built 1947). It is claimed in the National Trust survey of ocean and harbour pools that Wylie's Baths is the oldest surviving communal sea baths in Australia.

Wylie's Baths is also historically significant in the development of amateur swimming clubs in Sydney and the development of competitive swimming in Australia. It forms a group with a number of other early Olympic-sized harbour and ocean swimming pools in Sydney built between the 1880s and the First World War to cater to the popularity of competitive swimming. This group of early pools predate the main construction phase of ocean pools in the 1930s and 1940s.

The place has a strong or special association with a person, or group of persons, of importance of cultural or natural history of New South Wales's history.

Wylie's Baths is strongly associated with the Wylie family who were important in the development of competitive swimming in Australia. Wylie's Baths was built by Henry Alexander Wylie who was a champion long-distance and underwater swimmer. He managed the baths from 1907 until 1959.

Wylie's Baths is closely associated with many swimmers of note including female Olympic champions, Mina Wylie and Sarah (Fanny) Durack, and long-distance swimmer Des Renford.

Wilhelmina (Mina) Wylie (1891–1984) was the daughter of Henry Alexander Wylie and an early female swimming champion. Together with Sarah (Fanny) Durack (1889–1956), Mina Wylie represented Australia at the 1912 Stockholm Olympics (the first Olympic Games to admit female swimmers). Durack won the gold medal and Wylie the silver for the 100 metres freestyle. In an extraordinary swimming career which spanned from 1906 to 1934 Mina Wylie won every NSW and Australian swimming title (a total of 115), making her and Fanny Durack the first in a long line of Australian female swimming champions.

Mina Wylie was also important in promoting women's swimming. She, with Rose McIver, formed the Randwick Coogee Ladies Amateur Swimming Club which has managed the Women's Baths just north of Wylie's since 1922.

Wylie's Baths is also strongly associated with long-distance ocean swimming champion Des Renford (1927–1999), who swam the English Channel 19 times, was awarded an MBE, and was a regular swimmer at Wylie's and active in the management of the Wylie's Baths Trust.

Wylie's Baths is one of a group of harbour and ocean swimming pools which have strong associations with an Australian swimming champion. Others include the Andrew "Boy" Charlton Pool in The Domain and the Dawn Fraser Swimming Pool in Balmain, the Lavender Bay Baths, now demolished (associated with the Cavill family).

Wylie's Baths is also associated with the architects, Allen Jack+Cottier, whose conservation work was awarded the 1995 Greenway Award for Conservation by the Royal Australian Institute of Architects.

The place is important in demonstrating aesthetic characteristics and/or a high degree of creative or technical achievement in New South Wales.

Wylie's Baths, located on the rocks at the southern end of Coogee Beach, makes use of a dramatic ocean setting. The raised timber boardwalk is architecturally striking and wraps around the rock face on two sides. It offers uninterrupted views across the water and rocks to Coogee Beach. The baths are a popular swimming and picnic spot.

The baths and the raised boardwalk are also very prominent and clearly visible from Coogee Beach. The baths have become a well-known Sydney landmark and closely identified with Coogee Beach as a holiday seaside destination.

The baths, despite recent extensive conservation, survive as possibly the last intact example of a turn-of-the-century ocean swimming complex, complete with timber boardwalk, change rooms, kiosk and store. The raised boardwalk, in particular, is rare among Sydney ocean and harbour pools for its size and construction. It offers an ingenious design solution to the problem of providing amenities on a steep cliff face site and represents a good example of vernacular architecture.

Wylie's Baths has also become a popular subject for amateur and professional photographers. Photographic studies typically feature the dramatic ocean setting, the stark architectural qualities of the wooden structures, and the nostalgic seaside appeal of the setting.

The place has strong or special association with a particular community or cultural group in New South Wales for social, cultural or spiritual reasons.

Wylie's Baths has social significance for the generations of Sydneysiders who have visited the baths since they opened in 1907. The baths are held in great affection for their associations with seaside holiday memories and recreational swimming. The baths have been used for many competitive and recreational events, including amateur swimming clubs, fitness training, learn-to-swim classes as well as for general swimming, sunbathing and as a popular gathering place.

Wylie's Baths is also significant to a number of local Coogee amateur swimming clubs: South Maroubra Dolphins (formed 1960), Randwick / Coogee Amateur Swimming Club (formed 1896), Randwick Digger's Swimming Club (formed 1936) and Coogee Surf Life Saving Club. These clubs have had a long involvement with the site and were instrumental in re-opening Wylie's Baths after the storm damage in the 1970s.

Wylie's Baths is highly significant to the Coogee community as a local landmark and as contributing to the sense of place and identity of Coogee of a seaside resort. The high esteem in which it is held is demonstrated by the community agitation for its conservation and re-opening following the damage by storms in the 1970s. The local community continues to be involved in the ongoing management of the baths via the Wylie's Baths Trust, which consists of representatives from local swimming clubs, the general public and Randwick Council.

Wylie's Baths is also held in high regard by the wider Sydney Community as a landmark and for its historical significance as an ocean pool. This esteem is demonstrated by the numerous heritage listings for the baths (Randwick City Council LEP, National Trust of Australia (NSW), Australian Heritage Commission – interim).

The place has potential to yield information that will contribute to an understanding of the cultural or natural history of New South Wales.

Due to the harshness of the marine environment and the European occupation of the site since the 1900s, Wylie's Baths is unlikely to yield any archaeological evidence of former Aboriginal occupation or European occupation in the nineteenth century. Nor is the site likely to yield further scientific information in relation to the natural environment.

The pool and the unusual timber boardwalk, despite various modifications over time, have potential to yield further information on turn-of-the-century vernacular construction techniques and as such are of technical and research significance.

The baths may have significance and special meaning for Aboriginal groups, both pre and post-contact. Further research is required to investigate this possibility.

The place possesses uncommon, rare or endangered aspects of the cultural or natural history of New South Wales.

Wylie's Baths can be considered rare among Sydney's ocean and harbour pools in surviving as a complete turn-of-the-century swimming complex that includes an Olympic-sized pool, boardwalk, men's and women's change rooms, kiosk and store. The sensitivity of the recent conservation works, completed in 1995, has respected and preserved the integrity of the original swimming complex.

The size and height of the timber boardwalk at Wylie's Baths is possibly unique amongst Sydney ocean and harbour pools. The boardwalk is a well-known Sydney landmark and survives where other once-common timber boardwalks have not. As such, it is rare.

The place is important in demonstrating the principal characteristics of a class of cultural or natural places/environments in New South Wales.

Wylie's Baths is a good representative example of an ocean swimming pool built around Sydney's ocean beaches and harbour foreshores in the late nineteenth and early twentieth centuries. In being built of rock and concrete, the pool shares construction features with a number of other Sydney pools, including Bondi, Fairlight and Narrabeen Pools. These pools largely rely on tidal flushing to clean the water and pre-date the use of chlorination.

Wylie's Baths also has a timber boardwalk in common with a number of pools, including the Dawn Fraser Swimming Pool in Balmain, Northbridge Baths and Redleaf Pool in Double Bay. Because of the need for ongoing repair and maintenance of these timber structures, some others have not survived.

== See also ==
- Ocean pools in Australia
- McIver Women's Baths
