= Dawn Fraser Swimming Pool =

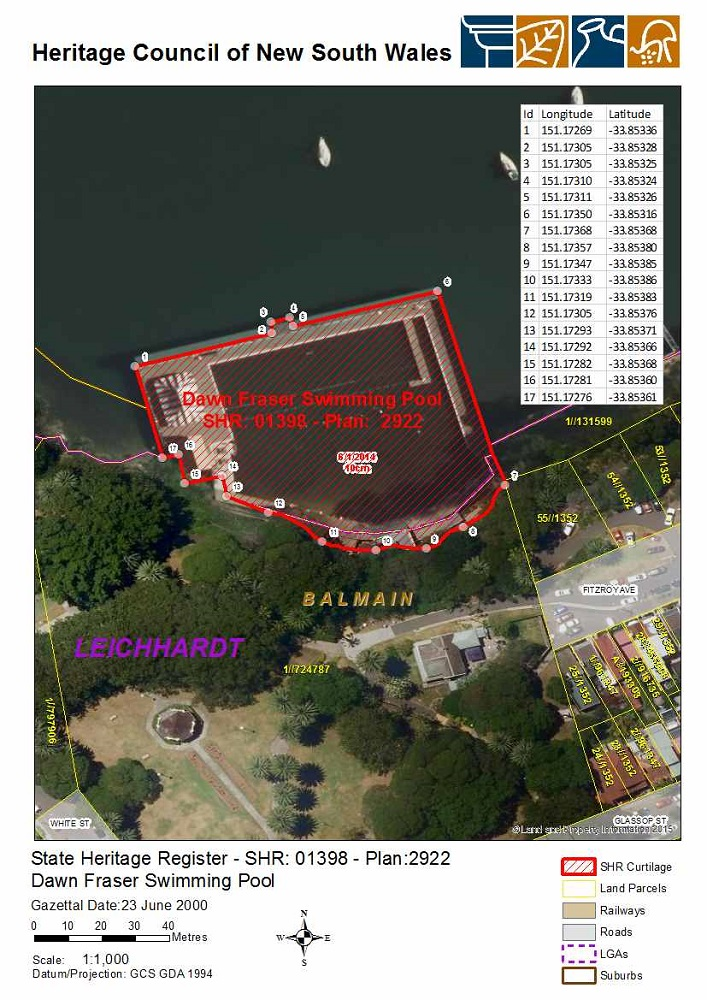
- Heritage boundaries

- Location within Sydney Location within Australia
- 33.8534°S 151.1732°E
- Location: Glassop Street, Balmain, Inner West Council, Sydney, New South Wales, Australia

History
- Built: 1882–1924

Site notes
- Owner: Inner West Council

New South Wales Heritage Register
- Official name: Dawn Fraser Swimming Pool; Elkington Park Baths; Balmain Baths; Corporation Baths; Whitehorse Point Baths
- Type: state heritage (built)
- Designated: 23 June 2000
- Reference no.: 1398
- Type: Swimming Pool – inground built
- Category: Recreation and Entertainment
- Builders: James Reynolds

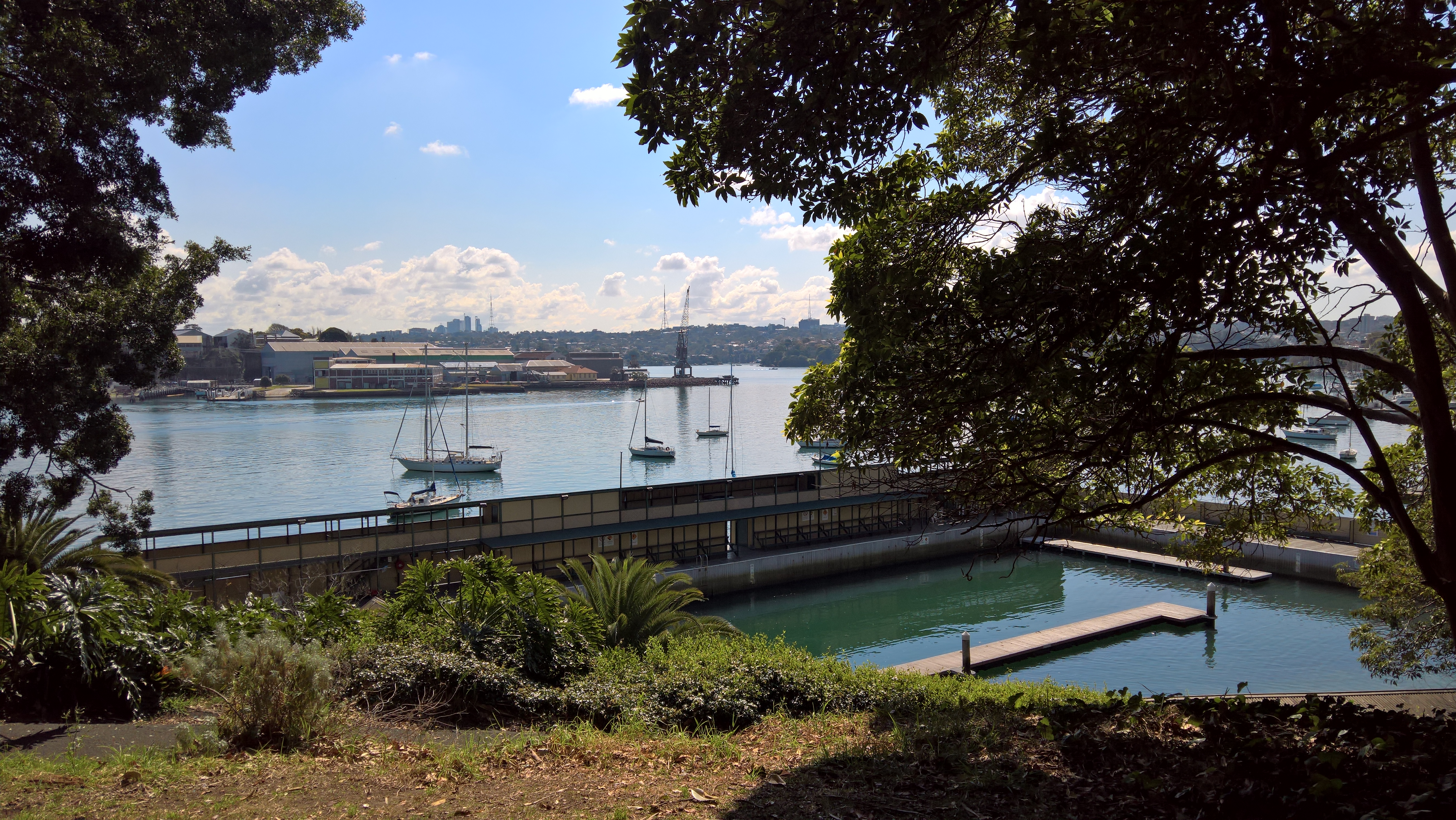
Dawn Fraser Swimming Pool, Balmain, New South Wales

Dawn Fraser Swimming Pool is a heritage-listed swimming baths complex at Glassop Street, Balmain, New South Wales, a suburb of Sydney, Australia. It was built by 1882 by James Reynolds, with alterations when it was enlarged in 1924. It is also known as Elkington Park Baths, Balmain Baths, Corporation Baths, Dawn Fraser Baths and Whitehorse Point Baths. The property is owned by the Inner West Council. It was added to the New South Wales State Heritage Register on 23 June 2000.

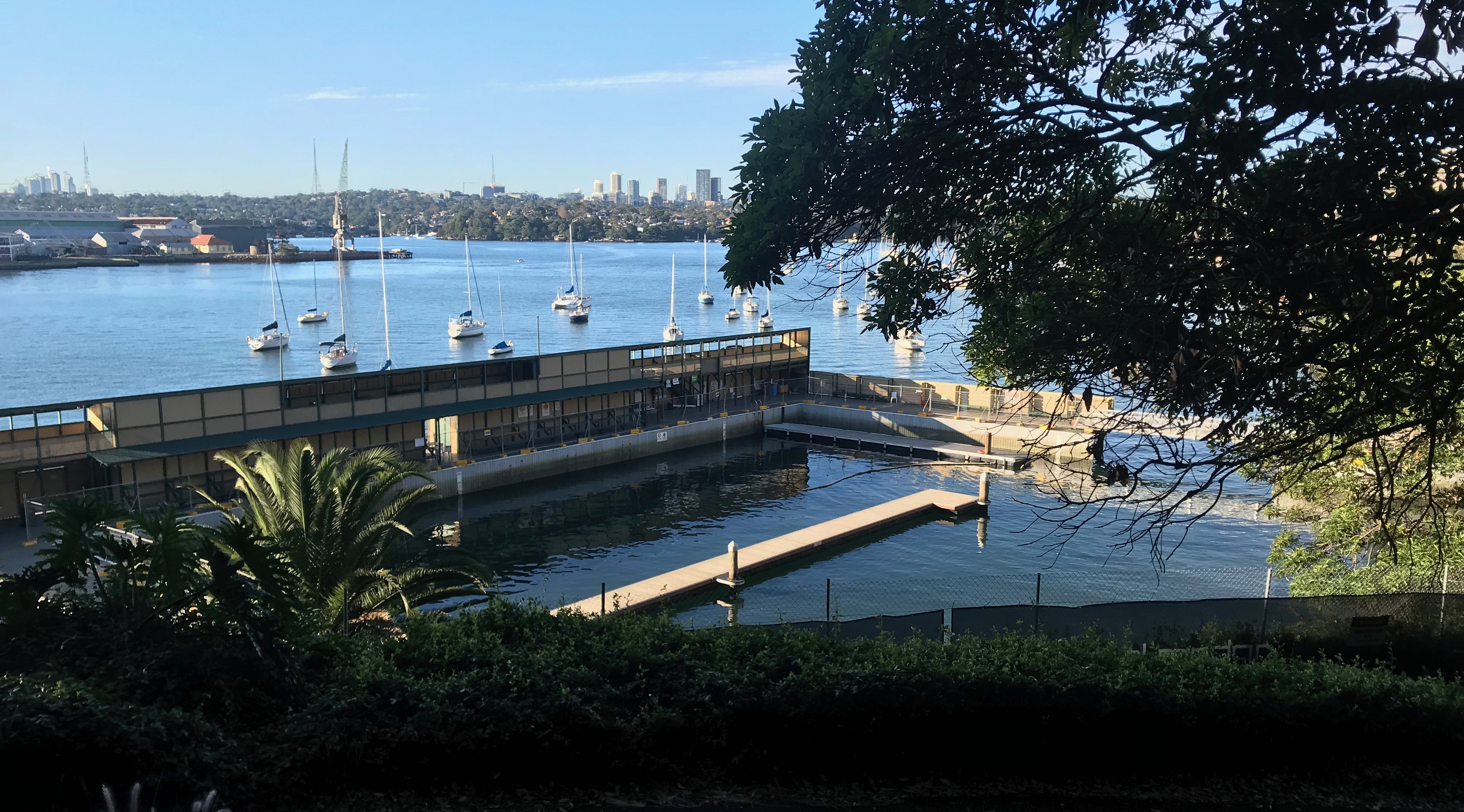
Hilltop view of the Dawn Fraser Baths

== History ==
Balmain Council acquired land at White Horse Point for public baths in 1880. A tender by James Reynolds was accepted in 1881 and the baths were in use by January 1882. They were open to men during daylight hours and at limited times for women.

The Balmain Swimming Club was founded in 1884 shortly after the baths were opened. When it celebrated its centenary, it was the first club to do so. The club is also thought to be the first swimming association in Australia and many of its members have achieved distinction in swimming, water polo, diving and life-saving.

In 1902 the original 1882 enclosure was replaced with one giving a width of 60 yards owing to pressure from the club. A two-storey changing and viewing pavilion (south) was added as well as two boardwalks extending out from the shore and one diagonal boardwalk. In 1904 a cottage was built in Elkington Park for the manager of the baths.

In 1924 the baths and structures were enlarged. Other main alterations were a north facing changing pavilion and grandstand, two springboards and a tower, a two-storey entry pavilion in the south pavilion, changing boxes on the west and east boardwalks, and the Western Shed. Swimmers who used the baths included Tony Fenech, Frank Jordan and Dawn Fraser. Repairs and alterations were carried out in 1956, 1957, 1959; a seating gallery was installed in 1961 and a stone wall was built around the children's pool in 1962.

In 1964 the pool was renamed in honour of Dawn Fraser, local resident and Olympic Swimming Champion at three consecutive Olympic Games. Dawn Fraser learnt to swim at the baths and swam with the Leichhardt-Balmain League of Swimmers from age 8 to 13. She then had two seasons with the Balmain Ladies Club and won two New South Wales Championships.

In 1983 the complex was refurbished and at this time much of the fabric of the building was replaced, the lattice was rebuilt and reinstated and the exterior cladding around the edge of the baths above the water was changed from corrugated iron to timber.

== Description ==
An irregular shaped swimming pool, enclosed by a timber structure, supported by timber piles where it is above the harbour. The main swimming area is almost square with the southern side curved to follow the shore. In the south-west corner, a wedge-shaped children's pool has been made to fit in with the existing configuration. The entrance to the baths is marked by a squat tower, which separates two timber buildings following the curve of the foreshore and contain the changing rooms for men and women and the swimming pool office. The buildings on the harbour side house the Balmain Swimming Club including club change rooms and there is also a tiered stand for spectators. The room in the tower houses the archives of the swimming club, which go back to 1884 and also served as a club meeting rooms. The pool itself is surrounded by a timber deck used for access, watching swimming races and sunbaking. At low tides there is a small sandy beach alongside the entrance.

Nearby, in Elkington Park, is a brick cottage for the manager of the baths.

== Heritage listing ==
The pool is a complete swimming complex extending back to the turn-of-the century. It is an example of pool architecture no longer practiced and a well known Sydney landmark set in an attractive harbourside location which has become a feature of the pool. It is representative of the development of a harbourside recreational and social facility and is associated with prominent swimming identities and world champions. It provides evidence of the major popularity of swimming as a competitive and recreational sport in Australia.

Dawn Fraser Swimming Pool was listed on the New South Wales State Heritage Register on 23 June 2000 having satisfied the following criteria:

- The place is important in demonstrating the course, or pattern, of cultural or natural history in New South Wales.

It is the most complete swimming complex extending back to the turn-of-the century. It is associated with Dawn Fraser a local resident and Olympic Swimming Champion at three consecutive Olympic games.

- The place is important in demonstrating aesthetic characteristics and/or a high degree of creative or technical achievement in New South Wales.

It is an example of pool architecture no longer practices and a known Sydney landmark set in an attractive harbourside location which has become a feature of the pool.

- The place has strong or special association with a particular community or cultural group in New South Wales for social, cultural or spiritual reasons.

It is socially significant as a local recreational landmark and the home of the Balmain Swimming Club – probably the oldest swimming club in Australia. It provides evidence of the major popularity of swimming as a competitive and recreational sport in Australia.

- The place possesses uncommon, rare or endangered aspects of the cultural or natural history of New South Wales.

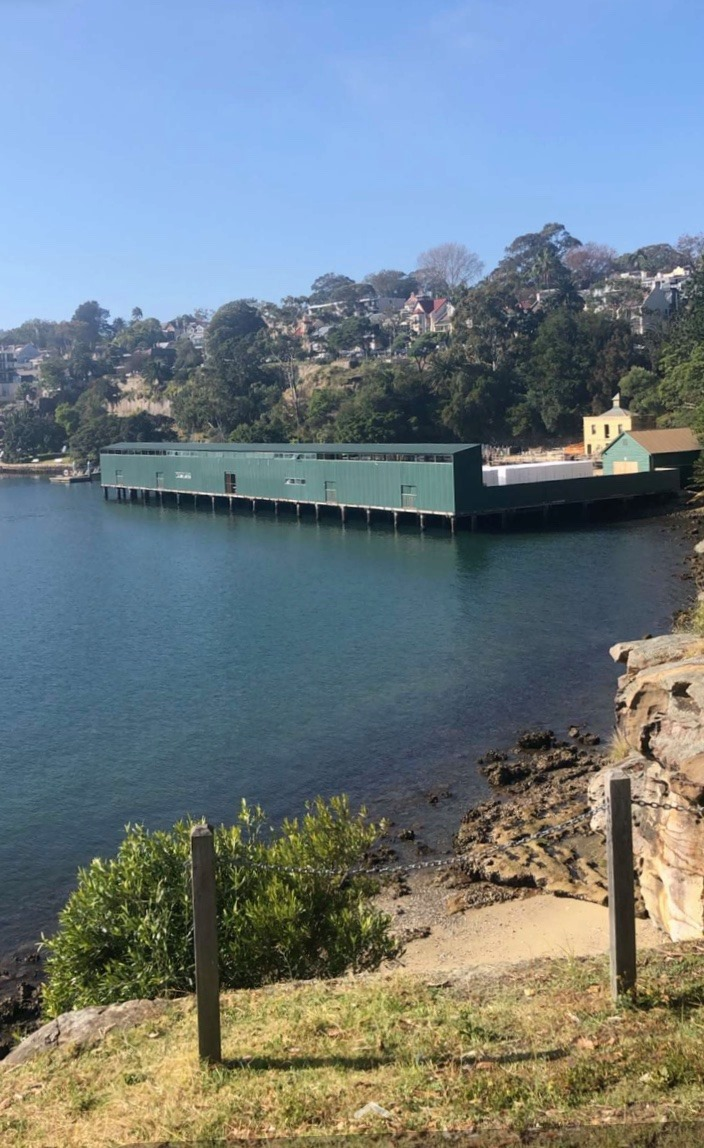
Dawn Fraser Pool under renovation in May 2020

One of the few remaining tidal public pools in Sydney Harbour and the only one to retain its over-water-enclosure.

== See also ==
- List of sports venues named after individuals
