= Newcomen Street Corporation Baths =

Public baths in Newcastle, NSW, Australia

Newcomen Street Corporation Baths were public baths in Newcastle, Australia. Opened in 1888, ongoing financial and hygiene problems resulted in the closure of the baths in 1906. The baths provided a place for the public to bathe in sea water while enjoying the health benefits in a safe manner. The building was converted into an arcade in 1934, and parts of the original façade are still visible today.

== History ==
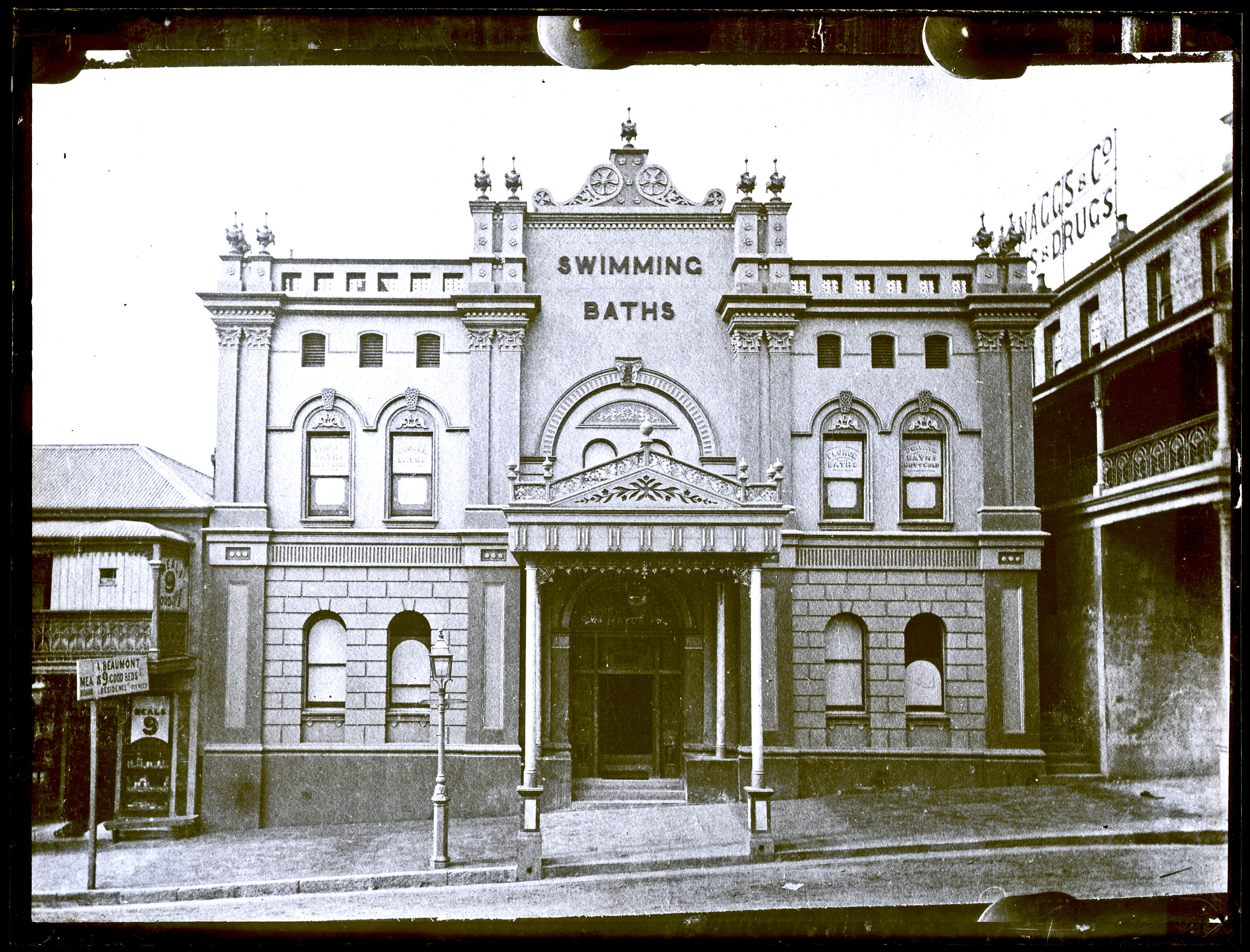
Newcomen Street entrance

In January 1877 Wickam Council announced that new public baths would be built the following summer.

The people of Newcastle had petitioned the council to build the public baths to appease fears about public safety and modesty. Newcastle's beaches were considered a dangerous place to swim, despite the belief that bathing in the sea was good for health that was common in the 1800s. The council allowed swimming at the beach for no charge between 8 pm - 5 am, and many men were arrested for swimming outside these hours. After a 'flashing' incident in 1842, an area was designated specifically for women to swim at Newcastle beach, but the spot was quite exposed, and women sought a place where they could bathe, safe from prying eyes, sharks and rough surf.

In January 1879 a proposed site was surveyed, and considered unsuitable. In May 1887, a suitable site was found and work began in June that year. The baths were designed by architects Jeater, Rodd and Hay.

Construction of the baths involved solving numerous engineering challenges, including requiring Hunter Water to cart water through Hunter Street, significant improvements to the drainage system affecting Hunter, Darby and Newcomen Streets, and erecting pumps in Hunter Street and Perkin Street.

== The building ==
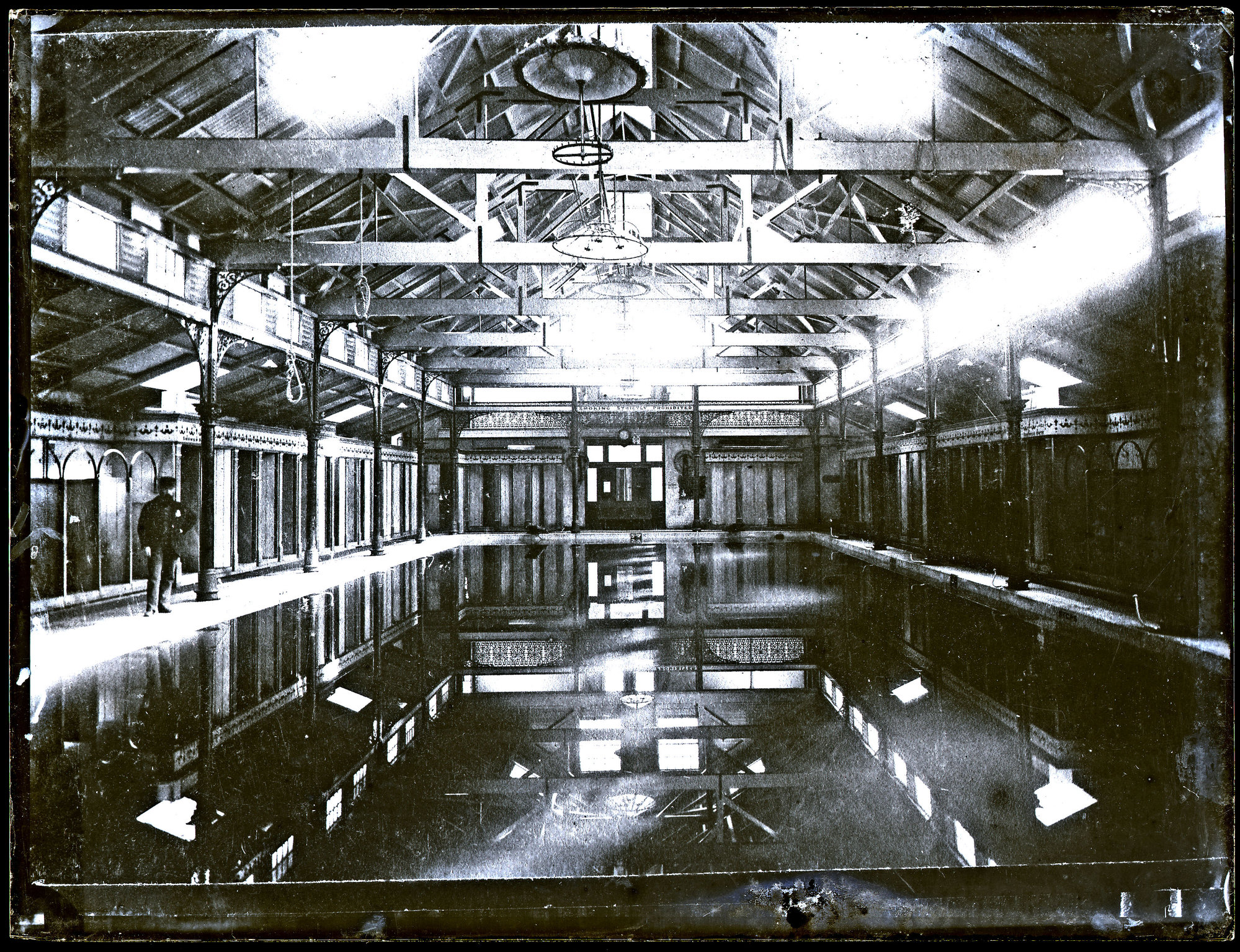
Interior of Newcomen Street Corporation Baths

The baths were completed on 14 December 1887 but did not open for swimming until 26 January 1888. They were officially opened by the Mayor of Newcastle, Alderman G W Web, on 14 February 1888. The baths cost the council between £3500 and £4000.

The building is located on the eastern side of Newcomen Street, between Hunter and Scott streets, a location that was considered convenient for the people of Newcastle. Entry was to the west of the arcade.

The building measured 40 ft (12 m) high and 200 ft (61 m) long and 68 ft (21 m) wide. The salt water swimming basin was 155 ft (47 m) long by 55 ft (17 m) wide, with a water-depth of 3 ft (0.91 m) to 6 ft (1.8 m).

The baths were located on an L-shaped lot with narrow street frontages. The building was Corinthian in style with a portico entrance. The roof had iron columns and arched spinals, glass lanterns, and seven skylights.

The baths had fifty dressing boxes, fifty seats and six freshwater showers. The ground floor consisted of a caretakers' room, and ticket office, toilets, and waiting rooms. Upstairs there were nine private hot and cold baths, with the option of fresh and salt water, which could be also infused with sulphur. Many doctors during the 1890s encouraged people with disease such eczema and gout to use these baths as a form treatment.

The concrete swimming pool on the ground floor was filled with sea water, pumped from Newcastle Beach a kilometre away. It took six hours to fill and one hour to empty. In the evening, the swimming basin was lit with electrical lighting from underneath. Electric lighting and a steam heating system was later installed in the pool to attract people to swim in the winter.

In August 1900 the baths were renovated to improve hygiene and the appearance of the façade, including painting, repairing the stonework, and tiling the porch with encaustic tiles, which were chocolate and white.

In the 1930s there were large glass etchings, depicting a person driving a car, an aeroplane, a kangaroo, a big fish, and long waves. The colour of the glass in the etching was pink, green and yellow.

== Uses ==
The baths hosted swimming carnivals and lessons for children and adults. Swimming carnivals were so popular that a viewing gallery was later added. In 1904 the baths hosted its first and only national swimming carnival.

Concerts were held at the baths, in an attempt to draw bigger crowds. These concerts raised money for local hospitals and charities.

There were also shops on the site, including a florist and places where people could buy refreshments.

== Problems and complaints ==
Complaints about cleanliness of the baths began as early as two months after opening.

- The water was often dirty, contaminated by soot from nearby chimneys and miners who swam at the baths after work.
- The water was only changed four times per week, which was not considered frequent enough, given there were up to 500 people swimming in the baths each day.
- The baths trapped bad smells, due to poor drainage and wooden fittings
- Drains overflowed regularly, and stained the concrete green.
- Staff did not clean the dress boxes regularly, or collect rubbish.

The baths were not profitable, and in 1891 council started to discuss closing the baths.

The majority of bathers were men, and in 1894 women were temporarily denied access to the baths as a cost saving measure. This was as a result of poor attendance by women on Thursday and Sunday, the days designated for ladies bathing. The decision was later reversed after a petition was signed.

The baths were rarely used in the winter months, and swimming in the ocean started became increasingly popular during the 1900s. The bogey hole was enlarged, and an iron railing constructed for additional safety. People also began to swim at the public beach between from Zaara and Telford streets, after improvements to the beach.

After years of financial losses and ongoing issues with cleanliness, the baths were eventually closed on 31 March 1906.

== After the closure ==
After the closure, council was approached with many proposals for leasing the site including a skating rink, dance venue or a boxing saloon. In the years immediately after closure, the venue was used for a range of purposes including a dog show, swimming competitions, music hall, and print studio.

In 1908 the building became a picture theatre. King's Picturescope Palace, later renamed The Elite, was a silent movie theatre which operated until 1917 when their licence was revoked.

In 1918 the building housed an oyster and billiards hall, with a print works downstairs.

In 1922 a fire caused considerable damage to the building.

The site was extensively remodelled between 1937 and 1938, including opening the present arcade which created a link between Newcomen and Hunter Street. The restoration during World War II revealed huge art deco style glass panels, from an earlier renovation.

Between 1957 and 1989 the building was owned by Newcastle Council, before being sold to businessmen Mike Constantine.
