= Water Polo by the Sea =

Event in Bondi, Sydney, Australia

The Water Polo by the Sea is an annual four-day international water polo event, staged at the Bondi Icebergs Club, The Rocks and Circular Quay in Sydney, Australia from 2011.
