= McIver Women's Baths =

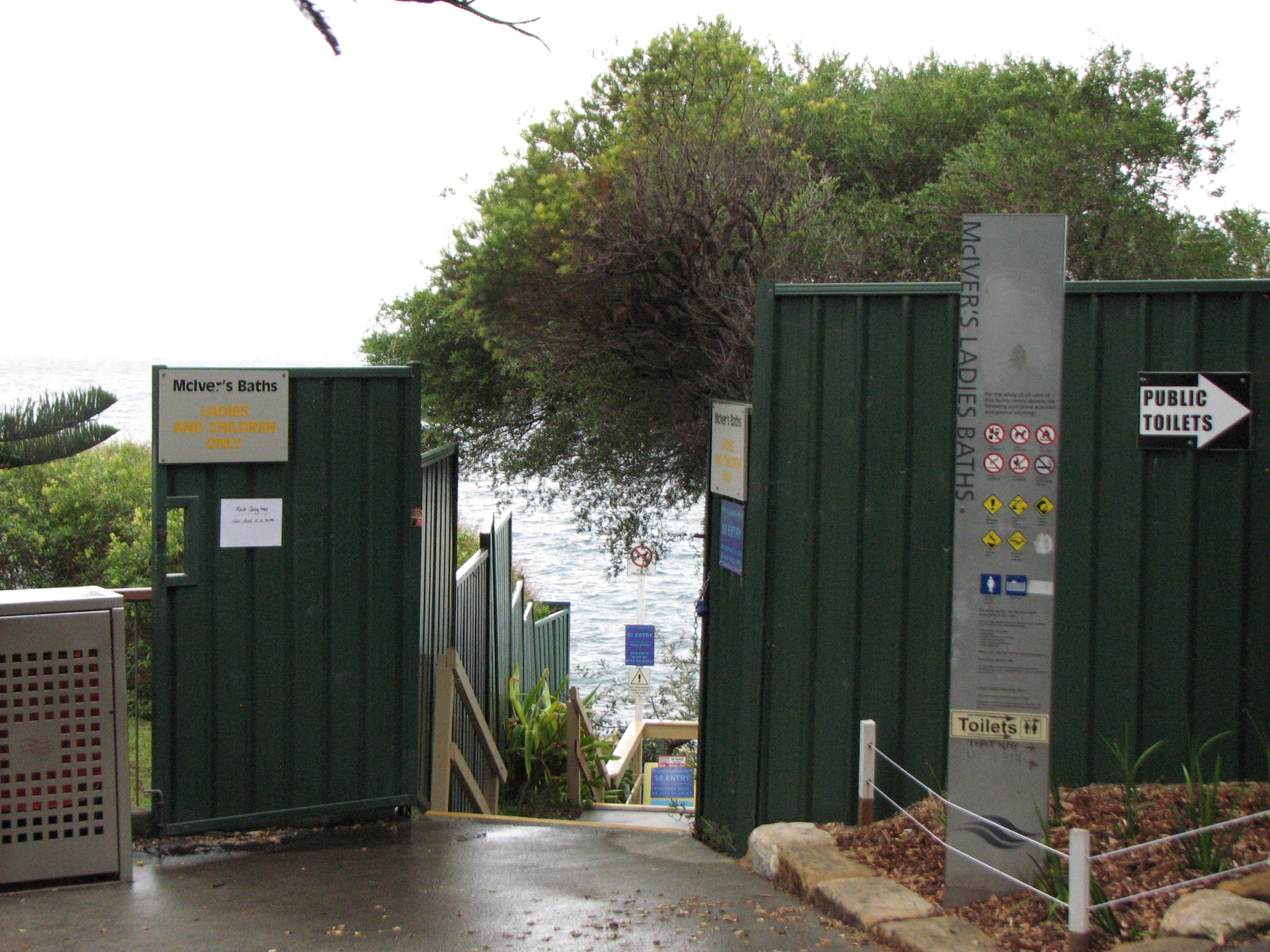
- The Entrance to McIver Women's Baths

- Location within Sydney Location within Australia
- 33°55′27″S 151°15′31″E
- Location: Grant Reserve, Coogee, City of Randwick, New South Wales, Australia

History
- Built: 1876–1886

Site notes
- Owner: Randwick City Council

New South Wales Heritage Register
- Official name: McIver Women's Baths; Coogee Women's Pool; Ladies Baths
- Type: State heritage (complex / group)
- Designated: 18 November 2011
- Reference no.: 1869
- Type: Swimming Pool – tidal
- Category: Recreation and Entertainment

McIver Women's Baths is a heritage-listed women's baths at Grant Reserve, Coogee, City of Randwick, New South Wales, Australia. It was built from 1876 to 1886. It is also known as Coogee Women's Pool and Ladies Baths. The property is owned by Randwick City Council. It was added to the New South Wales State Heritage Register on 18 November 2011.

== History ==
=== Indigenous history ===
When Captain James Cook, and later the First Fleet, landed on Botany Bay, they encountered the Eora people, a vast and complex Aboriginal group of family and kin relations. "Their territory spread from the Georges River and Botany Bay in the south to Port Jackson, north to Pittwater at the mouth of the Hawkesbury River and west along the river to Parramatta". The coast and harbour were particularly important environments for the Aboriginal people of the Eora group, being an abundant source for fishing, food gathering and recreation. It has been reported that the site now occupied by the McIver Women's Baths, had long been used by the local Aboriginal women for bathing (the men frequenting the northern side of Coogee Beach). Whether or not these statements hold some truths, it is widely understood that the coastal environment was of great importance to the lifestyle of the Eora people.

=== Colonial history ===
There is considerable evidence to suggest that the early colonists regularly used the harbour for bathing. The hot climate and ready accessibility to the water made recreational bathing increasingly attractive and the activity was further encouraged by the British medical profession of the day proclaiming the therapeutic benefits of bathing in salt water and in the open air. Although a socially accepted pastime, bathing (particularly by men) was often conducted in the nude which resulted in moral concerns as early as 1810. In an effort to discourage naked bathing in open places where respectable people (primarily women and children) could take offence, Governor Macquarie released an edict declaring that "a very indecent and improper custom having lately prevailed of soldiers, sailors and inhabitants of the town bathing themselves at all hours of the day at the Government Wharf and also in the dock-yard, His Excellency, the NSW Governor, directs and commands that no person shall bathe at either of these places in the future, at any hours of the day". Despite these early restrictions, the activity remained a popular and fashionable pastime in the colony.

==== Public bathing in Sydney ====
Further efforts to regulate the practice came with the construction of the first public bathing house in the Domain in 1826. Open only to men, the establishment of a women's bathing house soon followed in the 1830s. Despite officially establishing enclosed venues where people could undress and bathe in a private and concealed space, the "menace" of open bathers continued, finally resulting in laws being made in 1833 prohibiting bathing "near to or within view of any public wharf, quay or bridge, street, road or other public resort within the limits of the towns between the hours of six in the morning and eight o'clock in the evening". Unlike Governor Macquarie's previous edict, any transgressions of this Act carried a fine of one pound – a sizeable amount to the working man of the day.

As well as enforcing the notion of public decency and modesty, restricting swimming also served to protect open water bathers from the threat of sharks in the harbour. With the colony developing in (what is now) the centre of Sydney, the early industries were actively discharging waste and pollution directly into the harbour thus attracting a greater number of sharks. Ultimately, "with the threat of "finny fiends", a hot climate, the growing influence of the "respectable" middle classes, a wider enjoyment of spare money and leisure time, plus a widespread belief in the efficacy of salt-water bathing and the virtues of exercise, the construction of swimming pools increased apace".

Coogee, having quickly become known for its beach environment, was soon attracting visitors and permanent residents prior to its gazettal as a village in 1838. With its growing population, there were reports that the baths were already in use as early as the 1830s. Up until this point, the women in the colony had been restricted in their usage of the various men's pools around Sydney (often limited to certain days of the week and even certain hours of the day), but the popularity of this naturally occurring and sheltered rock pool led to it being developed by Randwick Council and officially opened as 'women's-only' baths in 1876. Having been excavated to an appropriate depth and enclosed with concrete walls, the baths were now a designated area where women could bathe in a private place.

As well as being the only legal form in which people could swim during daylight hours, ocean and harbour baths were also valued by the community as a smooth and calm swimming environment that provided security against drowning. At the time, despite great popularity as a form of physical recreation and exercise, few colonists had any regard for water safety or could even swim. In the early 19th century, drowning was a "major concern in a colony that relied heavily on water transport and where men, women and children with few swimming skills habitually wore heavy clothing that increased their risk of drowning". As the notion of bathing evolved into the activity of swimming, lifesaving skills became regarded as a community, as well as personal, improvement. The early Australian beach culture had begun.

The evolution of swimming coincided with the widespread inclusion of swimming lessons in the school curriculum for girls in NSW. Sport was promoted as a physical balance to the mental activities of the school day but swimming, in particular, was encouraged as a graceful and respectful exercise for women to pursue. The sport was one that posed little to no threat to the established social expectations required of women in the late 19th century. Swimming was seen to have the virtue of disguising the body under water while hiding any outward appearances of power, endurance or physical exertion. With the usual undesirable effects of exercise effectively hidden from public view, the pure Victorian image of womanhood was maintained.

At the turn of the century, although swimming was growing in popularity, the activity was still restricted by the day-light hours ban that had been in place since 1833. The successful stand against these regulations came in September 1902 when William Gocher (editor of the Manly and North Sydney News) made it his personal crusade to publicly disobey the ban. At noon on three successive Sundays, Gocher entered the ocean at Manly Beach and on the third occasion was arrested in front of some 1000 spectators. This action led to a liberalisation of the law in 1903, with the condition that all swimmers over eight years old wore neck-to-knee bathing costumes. Other conditions of the rescinded ban were that bathers had to leave the beach immediately after swimming and that there was to be no gender mixing or socialisation with members of the "dressed" public.

=== Competitive swimming as a sport ===
Around this same period, the McIver Women's Baths underwent a change in its management. Previously, the responsibility of developing and maintaining the baths had been extended by the State Government to Randwick Council under the Municipal Baths Act 1896. However, from 1918, management of the site went into the hands of private operators, Robert and Rose McIver, who developed the baths into the form maintained today. Rose McIver (alongside Mina Wylie, Bella O'Keefe and members of the Mealing and Wickham families) also had a significant role in the establishment of the Randwick and Coogee Ladies Amateur Swimming Club. When established in 1923, the club took over the McIver's lease of the site and has managed the baths ever since.

During this period, swimming as a competitive sport was growing in popularity. For both participants and spectators, swimming was an uncomplicated, low cost event with high entertainment value. Although swimming competitions were not held at the McIver Women's Baths (due, in part, to its short and irregular shape), it was the venue where a number of significant female swimmers first learnt their craft. As young girls, Sarah "Fanny" Durack and Wilhelmina "Mina" Wylie frequented the baths and both went on to become the first women to win gold and silver medals at the 1912 Stockholm Olympic Games (the first games that allowed women to participate in swimming competition – the 100m freestyle).

In the lead up to the Olympics, Durack and Wylie's bid to participate was severely threatened by the gender segregation that remained prevalent at swimming venues across NSW. In the early 20th century, the New South Wales Amateur Swimming Association (NSWASA) was the central controlling body for competitive swimming but, needing increasing attention, women's sport was soon administered by the newly created New South Wales Ladies Amateur Swimming Association (NSWLASA) in 1906.

Under the conservative feminist leadership of Rose Scott, the NSWLASA maintained strict segregation at the McIver Women's Baths (including forbidding male relatives as spectators) as well as regulating swimming costumes for the female competitors. The NSWLASA's active withdrawal of women's swimming competition from the public domain and the strict conditions enforced, caused increasing public decent in the community and, by 1912, by popular demand, segregation at competitive swimming events was abandoned.

Despite the end of segregated competition, the McIver Women's Baths were one of the few to retain its gender-specific use during a time when segregated swimming clubs were amalgamating. Operated by the Randwick Coogee Ladies Amateur Swimming Club since 1923, the baths continue to be a popular swimming venue for a variety of women, including older women, women with disabilities, the Catholic and Islamic community and those who prefer to swim in privacy.

In 1995, to reflect its importance to the female community, the site was granted an exemption under the Anti-Discrimination Act 1977 for a period of 25 years. This has served to cement its purpose as a women's-only area and it is a quality that has widespread support from the women that continue to regularly use this site.

== Description ==
Sited on a rock platform to the south of Coogee Beach, the McIver Women's Baths is a naturally occurring 20 metres (66 ft) ocean pool that was deepened and formalised in the 19th century to create a safe and usable swimming facility within the maritime environment. Susceptible to natural tidal and wave movements, the pool is aesthetically positioned on the ocean's edge with panoramic views to the surrounding beaches, bays and cliffs.

Accessed from Grants Reserve, the privacy of the baths (and sitting/sun-bathing areas) is maintained by dense landscaping, winding concrete pathways and stairs that lead directly to the water.

The baths are also complemented by a number of modest facilities and amenities buildings.

=== Condition ===
This site has remained in active use since the 1870s (although there are reports of use as early as the 1830s). Having been exposed to the natural ocean environment and the coastal weather patterns for this period of time, the weather has had a definitive effect on the condition of the baths and the physical fabric of the site. These effects have seen the fabric repaired, renewed or replaced on a number of occasions to ensure that the condition of the baths remain acceptable for its use to continue.

The integrity of this site derives, in part, from its natural origins on the rock platform. However, the fabric of the baths and the adjoining facilities has been compromised by the unrelenting coastal environmental factors that surround the site. These effects have seen the fabric repaired, renewed or replaced on a number of occasions. The primary objective of listing the McIver Women's Baths is not to conserve the original or in situ fabric. The replacement or repair (where appropriate) of the in situ fabric will allow the site to continue to be used by the community and it will serve to protect the inherent privacy of the location. The strong conditions of the coastal environment has seen the adjoining fabric (the railings, fences and amenities buildings) already repaired and replaced on a number of occasions. The intention of the listing is not to conserve the current fabric but to see it replaced (when necessary) to ensure the baths continue to be used.

== Heritage listing ==
As at 5 July 2011, The McIver Women's Baths are of State heritage significance as, reportedly, the only remaining swimming venue (specifically reserved for women) in continuous use in NSW (and, perhaps, Australia). Formally recognised in 1876, but in use since the 1830s, the McIver Women's Baths have been well frequented by the female community as, initially, a safe and naturally secluded place to bathe and, later, as a private venue to swim and learn water safety skills.

The baths also have a historical association with the rise of competitive swimming in NSW. Although not used as a venue for competitions, the baths were used by Fanny Durack and Mina Wylie to develop their swimming skills (Durack and Wylie went on to win gold and silver medals at the 1912 Stockholm Olympic Games – the first Games to allow women to participate in competitive swimming – the 100m freestyle).

The McIver Women's Baths are also particularly significant for their social value to the female community of NSW. Since the early female colonists first utilised this pool in the 1830s, generations of women have visited and used this naturally occurring swimming site. Its privacy as a gender-segregated facility has been a long-held attraction for a range of different women in NSW – including, as an example, mothers and children, elderly women, women with disabilities and women from Islamic and Catholic communities.

In 1995, having been granted an exemption under the Anti-Discrimination Act 1977, the McIver Women's Baths cemented its purpose as a women's area and its ongoing use reflects the high regard the female community continues to have for this site.

McIver Women's Baths was listed on the New South Wales State Heritage Register on 18 November 2011 having satisfied the following criteria.

The place is important in demonstrating the course, or pattern, of cultural or natural history in New South Wales.

The McIver Women's Baths are of State heritage significance as, reportedly, the only remaining swimming venue (specifically for women) in continuous use in NSW (and, perhaps, Australia). Formally recognised in 1876, but in use since the 1830s, the baths continue to be well frequented by the female community as a safe and naturally secluded place to bathe and as a private venue to swim and learn water safety skills.

The McIver Women's Baths also have a historical connection with the rise of competitive swimming in NSW. Although not used as a venue for competitions, the baths were used by Fanny Durack and Mina Wylie to develop their swimming skills (Durack and Wylie went on to become the first women to win gold and silver medals at the 1912 Stockholm Olympic Games).

When gender-segregation at swimming venues was all but abandoned in the early 20th century, the McIver Women's Baths was one of the very few ocean pools in NSW to retain its use as a women's only facility. This purpose was enforced further in 1995 when the baths were granted an exemption under the Anti-Discrimination Act 1977 to continue as a swimming venue reserved only for the use of women.

The place has a strong or special association with a person, or group of persons, of importance of cultural or natural history of New South Wales's history.

The McIver Women's Baths are of State heritage significance for the association with Fanny Durack and Mina Wylie, who first learnt their swimming skills at this venue. Durack and Wylie went on to be the first women to win gold and silver medals, respectively, at the 1912 Stockholm Olympic Games – the first Olympic Games to allow women to participate in competitive swimming (the 100m freestyle).

Prior to this, the participation of women in competitive swimming in NSW was largely conditional but these restrictions were lifted (in the most part) when Durack and Wylie returned to Sydney as Olympic heroines.

The place is important in demonstrating aesthetic characteristics and/or a high degree of creative or technical achievement in New South Wales.

The McIver Women's Baths have heritage significance for the aesthetic juxtaposition of the built form of the baths and the natural environment in which they are set. With the panoramic views of the ocean, the neighbouring bays and the rugged cliffs that surround, the baths have an inherent natural beauty that contributes to its value by the community.

The place has a strong or special association with a particular community or cultural group in New South Wales for social, cultural or spiritual reasons.

The McIver Women's Baths have State heritage significance for its social value to the female community of NSW. In use since the 1830s by the early female colonists, the baths have long been used as a site for recreational bathing, swimming and water safety lessons for generations of Sydney women. The inherent privacy of the location and the beauty of its setting have attracted a range of different women to use the baths. Mothers with children, the elderly or disabled, women from Islamic and Catholic communities or women that prefer to swim in privacy, all continue to frequent the baths today and this popularity and continuity in its use reflects just how highly the site is regarded amongst the female community of NSW.

The place has potential to yield information that will contribute to an understanding of the cultural or natural history of New South Wales.

The McIver Women's Baths have some heritage significance for the technical skills evident in the excavation of the naturally occurring rock platform and its adaptation into the swimming facility in use today. The evident skill in the design and construction of this facility and the consideration given to the natural topography, geography and maritime environment also contributes to the significance of this site.

The baths have potential to reveal further information in demonstrating the relationship between the site and the Aboriginal women of the Eora group prior to European settlement of NSW.

The place possesses uncommon, rare or endangered aspects of the cultural or natural history of New South Wales.

The McIver Women's Baths are rare in that they are, possibly, the only swimming facility remaining in NSW (and, perhaps, Australia) that continues to be reserved specifically for the use of women.

The McIver Women's Baths are also somewhat rare having been granted an exemption under the Anti-Discrimination Act 1977. The baths are one of only 113 sites in NSW exempt under the Act (which includes, in addition to the McIver Women's Baths, only one other bathing facility reserved for women).

However, as an ocean pool, the McIver Women's Baths are not rare as there are numerous baths still in use along the NSW coastline.

The place is important in demonstrating the principal characteristics of a class of cultural or natural places/environments in New South Wales.

The McIver Women's Baths are representative of the numerous ocean baths constructed on the natural rock platforms along the NSW coast. This bath is fairly typical of this naturally occurring environment being adapted into a salt-water swimming facility during the late 19th century.

== See also ==
- Ocean pools in Australia
- Wylie's Baths
