= Ocean pools in Australia =

Ocean pools are an important feature of the Australian coastline particularly in New South Wales. Ocean pools or ocean baths are defined as public seawater pools sited on a rocky surf coast, so that waves can wash into the pool. The width, length and depth of ocean pools varies and often depends on their location on the coastline. Australia also has many harbour pools and these are usually netted or fenced and located in harbours or river mouths but not regarded as ocean pools.

== History ==
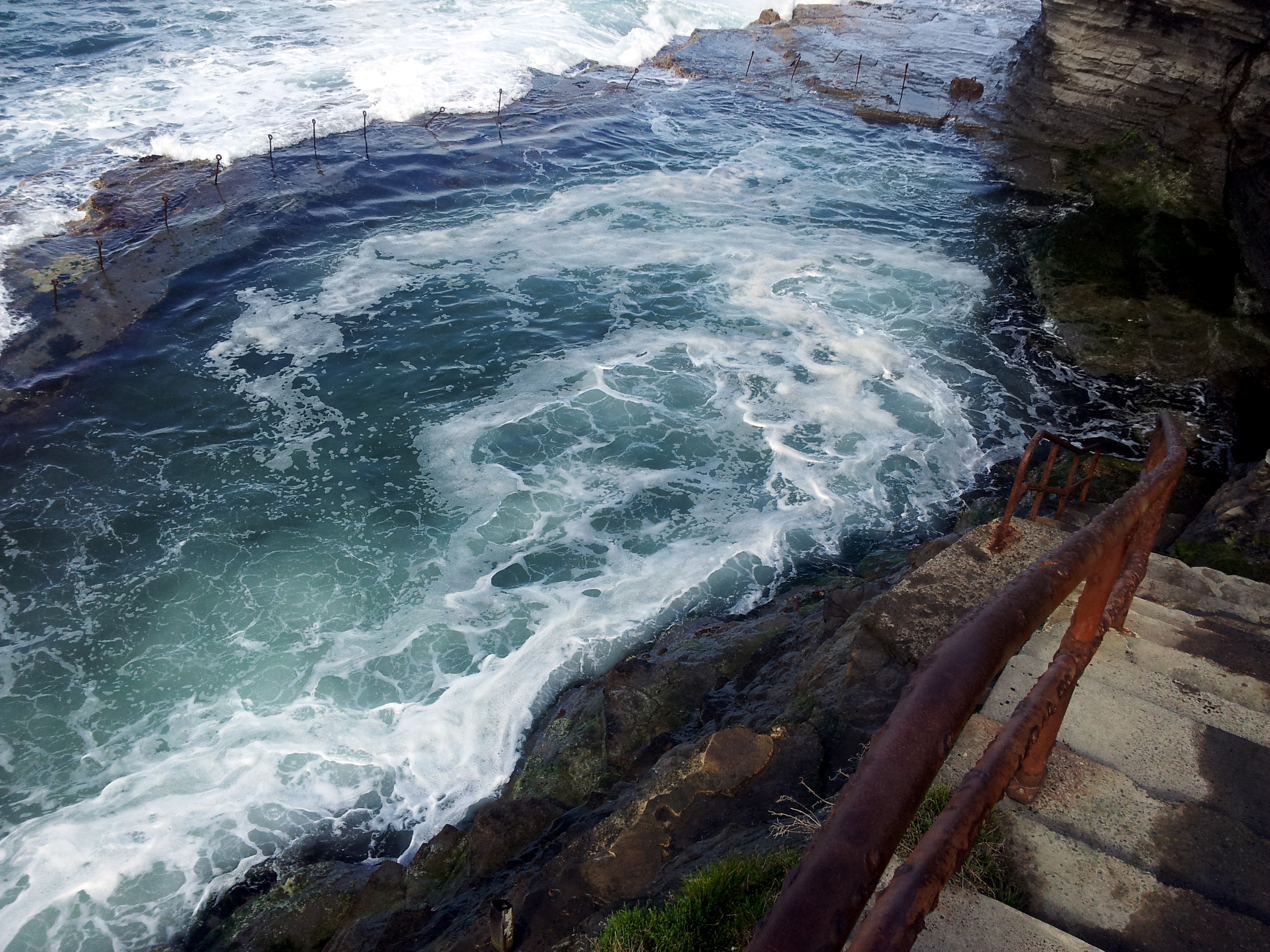
Bogey Hole in Newcastle

Ocean pools date back to the convict era in Australia with Newcastle's Bogey Hole being constructed in 1819 by convicts under the orders of Commandant James Morisset. Construction of ocean pools was generally through community subscriptions or government funded. Two ocean pools were privately built: the Pearl Beach Rock Pool, near Gosford was constructed by a real estate developer in the 1920s to help sell land, and Wylie's Baths in Coogee by entrepreneur Henry Wylie and his sons.

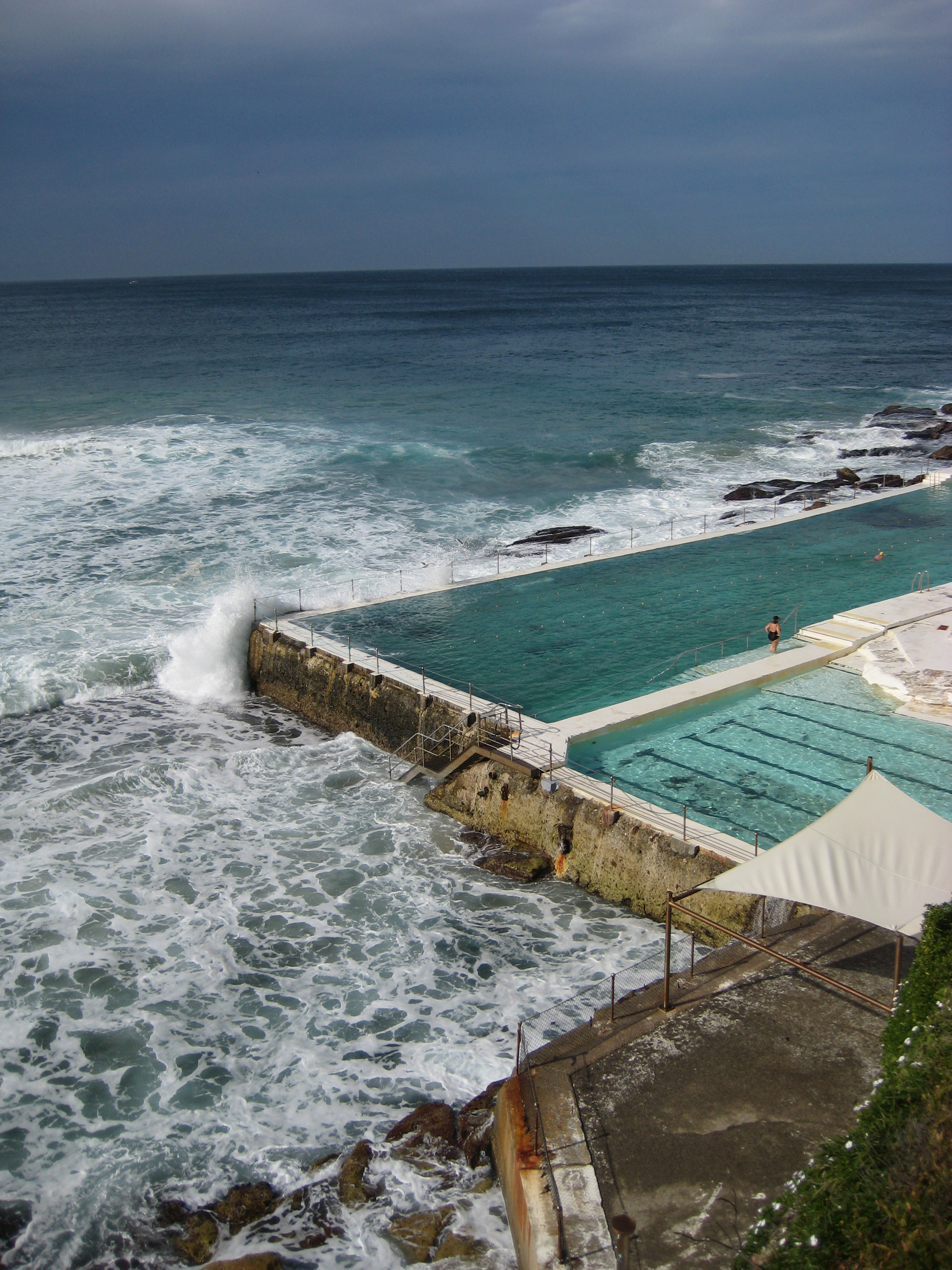
Bondi Icebergs Pool

Several ocean pools were once reserved only for the use of men or only for use by women and children and Sydney's Coogee Bay still hosts an ocean pool reserved solely for the use of women and children. Coogee's McIver's Baths constructed in the 1860s seems to now be the only seawater pool in Australia still reserved solely for use by women and children. Fanny Durack and Mina Wylie, who won gold and silver medals in the Women's 100m Freestyle at the 1912 Stockholm Olympics trained at this pool. The Beverley Whitfield Pool in Shellharbour is named after another of Australia's Olympic swimmers.

Wylie's Baths established in 1907 at Coogee, by Henry Alexander Wylie, the father of Mina Wylie, was one of the first mixed gender ocean pools in Australia;

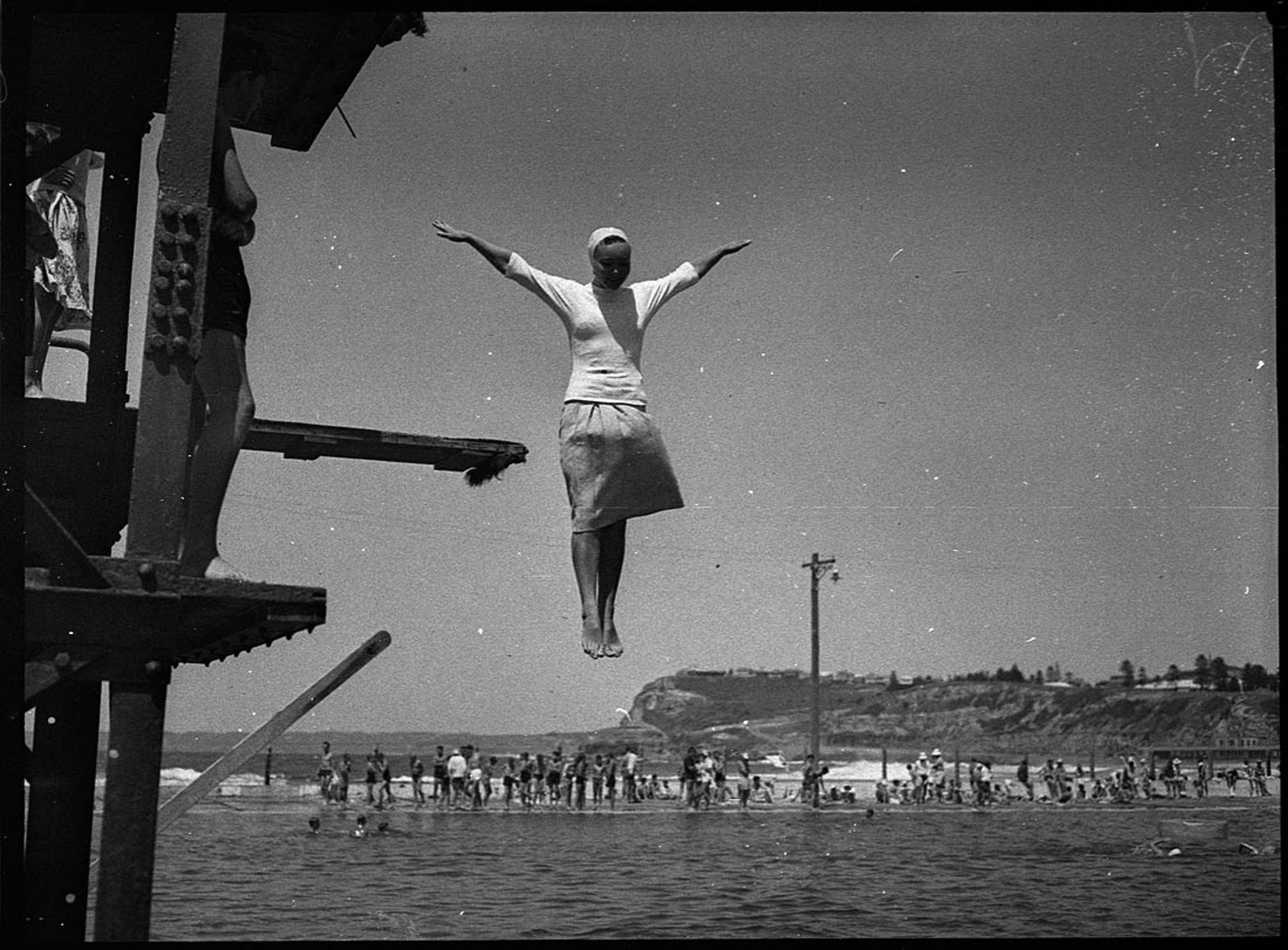
Newcastle Ocean Baths in 1953

There are about 100 ocean pools in New South Wales. In Perth, Western Australia there has been impetus to build ocean pools as a result of shark attacks; the state's first ocean pool will open at Ocean Reef Marina in 2026.

== List of ocean pools ==
Name	Location	Constructed	Opened	Length	Comments
Kings Beach Pool	Caloundra, Queensland				
Rainbow Beach Pool	Coolangatta, Queensland				
East Ballina Children's Pool	Ballina, New South Wales				
Yamba Rock Pool	Yamba, New South Wales		1969	33 m	
Sawtell Memorial Rock Pool	Sawtell, New South Wales		1962		
Black Head Rock Pool	Hallidays Point, New South Wales		1941	100 feet	
Forster Ocean Baths	Forster, New South Wales		1936	56 m along the northern wall (rear wall), 50 m along the eastern wall and 69 m along the western wall.	
Soldiers Baths	Newcastle, New South Wales		1883	180 yards oval	
Square Hole	Newcastle, New South Wales				
Newcastle Ocean Baths	Newcastle, New South Wales		1922	91.44x45.72 m	
Canoe Pool	Newcastle, New South Wales		1937		
The Ladies Bath	Newcastle, New South Wales				
Bogey Hole	Newcastle, New South Wales		1819		
Bar Beach Rock Pool	Newcastle, New South Wales				
Old Merewether Baths	Merewether, New South Wales				
Merewether Ocean Baths	Merewether, New South Wales		1935	110x90 yards	
Norah Head Pool	Norah Head, New South Wales				
The Entrance Ocean Baths	The Entrance, New South Wales	1938-1965 (multiple modifications)	1938	50m	Additional children's pool.
Terrigal Rock Pool	Terrigal, New South Wales				
Avoca Beach Rock Pool	Avoca Beach, New South Wales				
Mavis Pool	Copacabana, New South Wales				
MacMasters Beach Rock Pool	MacMasters Beach, New South Wales				
Killcare - Putty Beach Rock Pool	Killcare, New South Wales				
Umina Beach (site)	Umina Beach, New South Wales				
Pearl Beach Rock Pool	Pearl Beach, New South Wales				
Palm Beach Rock Pool	Palm Beach, New South Wales			50m	
Whale Beach Rock Pool	Whale Beach, New South Wales			25 m	
Avalon Rock Pool	Avalon Beach, New South Wales				
Bilgola Rock Pool	Bilgola Beach, New South Wales			50m	
Northern Headlands Rock Pool (site)	Newport, New South Wales				
Newport Rock Pool	Newport, New South Wales			50m	Length .
Mona Vale Rock Pool	Mona Vale, New South Wales			30m	Length 30 m. Also small children's pool.
North Narrabeen Rock Pool	North Narrabeen, New South Wales			50m	Length 50 m.
Collaroy Rock Pool	Collaroy, New South Wales				
Dee Why Rock Pool	Dee Why, New South Wales			50m	Length 50 m.
North Curl Curl Rock Pool	North Curl Curl, New South Wales			25m	Length 25 m.
South Curl Curl Rock Pool	Curl Curl, New South Wales			50m	Length 50 m.
Freshwater Rock Pool	Freshwater, New South Wales			50m	Length 50 m.
Queenscliff Rock Pool	Queenscliff, New South Wales	1937		50m	Constructed in 1937. Length 50 m.
Fairy Bower Pool	Manly, New South Wales	1929			
Marrinawi Cove	Port Jackson, New South Wales		9 January 2023		Constructed as part of the Barangaroo Headland redevelopment which opened 22nd August 2015.
Wally Weakes Pool	North Bondi, New South Wales				
Children's Pool	North Bondi, New South Wales				
Bondi Icebergs Pool	Bondi Beach, New South Wales	1887			
Bronte Bogey Hole	Bronte, New South Wales	1916			
Geoff James Pool (Clovelly Baths)	Clovelly, New South Wales				
Giles Baths	Coogee, New South Wales				
Ross Jones Memorial Pool (Coogee Beach Pool)	Coogee, New South Wales				
McIvers Baths (Coogee Women's Pool)	Coogee, New South Wales	1886			
Wylie's Baths	Coogee, New South Wales	1907			
Ivo Rowe Pool	South Coogee, New South Wales				
Mahon Pool	Maroubra, New South Wales	1932			
South Maroubra Rock Pools	Maroubra, New South Wales				
Malabar Pool	Malabar, New South Wales				
Little Bay Pool	Little Bay, New South Wales				
Northernmost Pool	Cronulla, New South Wales				
Children's Pool	Cronulla, New South Wales				
Main Ocean Pool	Cronulla, New South Wales				
Shelly Beach Pool	Cronulla, New South Wales				
Oak Park Pool	Cronulla, New South Wales				
Bulgo Pool	Otford, New South Wales				
Big Marley Rock Pool	Royal National Park, New South Wales				
Coalcliff Pool	Coalcliff, New South Wales				
Clifton Baths (site)	Clifton, New South Wales				
Doctors Pool (site)	Wollongong, New South Wales				
Scarborough Baths (site)	Scarborough, New South Wales				
Wombarra Baths	Wombarra, New South Wales				
Coledale Baths	Coledale, New South Wales				
Little Austinmer Children's Pool	Austinmer, New South Wales				
Old Thirroul Baths (site)	Thirroul, New South Wales				
Collins Point Baths - Woonona Pool	Woonona, New South Wales			50m	
Bellambi Pool	Bellambi, New South Wales				
Towradgi Pool	Towradgi, New South Wales				
Wollongong Rock Pool	Wollongong, New South Wales				
Wollongong Continental Baths	Wollongong, New South Wales				
Wollongong Nuns Pool	Wollongong, New South Wales				
Wollongong Ladies Baths (site)	Wollongong, New South Wales				
Fishermens Beach Rock Pool (site)	Port Kembla, New South Wales				
Barrack Point Pool (site)	Barrack Point, New South Wales				
Beverley Whitfield Pool	Shellharbour, New South Wales				
Pheasant Point Pool	Kiama, New South Wales				
Blowhole Point Pool	Kiama, New South Wales				
Werri Beach Pool	Gerringong, New South Wales				
Men's Baths (site)	Gerringong, New South Wales				
Currarong Pools	Currarong, New South Wales				
Mollymook Bogey Hole	Mollymook, New South Wales				
Ulladulla Sea Pool	Ulladulla, New South Wales				
Horseshoe Bay Pool (site)	Bermagui, New South Wales				
Blue Pool	Bermagui, New South Wales				
Zane Grey Pool (site)	Bermagui, New South Wales				
Aslings Beach Rock Pool	Eden, New South Wales	1961			
Cape Paterson Rock Pool	Cape Paterson, Victoria	1960s			
Mettams Pool	Trigg, Western Australia				
Hammersley Pool	North Beach, Western Australia				
Anastasia's Pool	Broome, Western Australia				

== Bibliography ==
- McDermott, Marie-Louise. Wet, wild and convivial: past, present and future contributions of Australia’s ocean pools to surf, beach, pool and body cultures and recreational coasts. PhD, Edith Cowan University, 2012
- McDermott, Marie-Louise. Ocean baths. Dictionary of Sydney, 2011
