= Randwick & Coogee Amateur Swimming Club =

Club information
- Full name: Randwick & Coogee Amateur Swimming Club
- Short name: Randwick Coogee ASC
- City: Sydney
- Founded: 1896

The Randwick & Coogee Amateur Swimming Club, formed in 1896, is one of the oldest swimming club's in Australia. The club swims at Wylie's Baths, Coogee in the Eastern Suburbs of Sydney, New South Wales, Australia.

RCASC is an inclusive swimming club for all ages and all abilities. They hold races, compete/train for ocean swims and hold social events. All four strokes are swum each Saturday plus a special event each fortnight. The clubs season starts on the first Saturday in October and concludes on the last Saturday in March. Registration commences at 8:00am with races beginning at 8:30 and concluding by 11:00am.

== History ==
When the club was first established it swam at the Coogee Aquarium and Swimming Baths. In December 1969 the club moved to Sunstrip Pool (now called Wylie's Baths). For a few months during the 1973/74 season the club swam at the Ross Jones Memorial Pool beneath the Coogee Surf Life Saving Club, before moving to the Coogee-Randwick RSL Club Pool later that season. The club moved back to Wylie's Baths in November 1978 and has been there ever since.

In 1996, the club celebrated its 100th anniversary. Life Member, Ron Brombey, created a Centenary Video for the occasion.

In 2021, the club celebrated its 125th anniversary with a formal dinner held at Coogee Surf Lifesaving Club. Various local dignitaries were in attendance.

== Executive Honour Role ==
Year	President	Secretary	Treasurer	Club Captain
2024-25	Annette Moran	Pauline Askin	Thorsten Trupke	Bronte Dickson
2023-24	Annette Moran	Anne Gately	Thorsten Trupke	Bronte Dickson
2022-23	Peter Court	Annette Moran	Anne Gately	Luke Porter-Daly
2021-22	Peter Court	Annette Moran	Anne Gately	Luke Porter-Daly
2020-21	Peter Court	Annette Moran	Anne Gately	Luke Porter-Daly
2019-20	Peter Court	Annette Moran	Gwilym Funnell	Luke Porter-Daly
2018-19	Peter Court	Annette Moran	Gwilym Funnell	Luke Porter-Daly
2017-18	Peter Court	Annette Moran	Gwilym Funnell	Luke Porter-Daly
2016-17	Peter Court	Annette Moran	Gwilym Funnell	Luke Porter-Daly
2015-16	Peter Court	Annette Moran	Gwilym Funnell	Luke Porter-Daly
2014-15	Peter Court	Annette Moran	Penny Weiss	Anthony Morris
2013-14	Peter Court	Annette Moran	Penny Weiss	Anthony Morris
2012-13	Peter Court	Annette Moran	Penny Weiss	Anthony Morris
2011-12	Peter Court	Annette Moran	Janice Morris	Anthony Morris
2010-11	Peter Court	Annette Moran	Janice Morris	Anthony Morris
2009-10	Peter Court	Nina Mili	Janice Morris	Anthony Morris
2008-09	Peter Court	Michael Parkinson	Janice Morris	Anthony Morris
2007-08	Maurice Daly	Michael Parkinson	Janice Morris	Julian McDowall
2006-07	Maurice Daly	Michael Parkinson	Janice Morris	Julian McDowall
2005-06	Maurice Daly	Michael Parkinson	Janice Morris	Julian McDowall
2004-05	Maurice Daly	Michael Parkinson	Janice Morris	Julian McDowall
2003-04	Maurice Daly	Michael Parkinson	Janice Morris	Julian McDowall
2002-03	Maurice Daly	Michael Parkinson	Janice Morris	Chris Grant
2001-02	Maurice Daly	Michael Parkinson	Janice Morris	Chris Grant
2000-01	Maurice Daly	Michael Parkinson	Janice Morris	Chris Grant
1999-2000	Maurice Daly	Michael Parkinson	Peter Carney	Chris Grant
1998-99	Maurice Daly	Michael Parkinson	Peter Carney	Rebecca Garvie
1997-98	Maurice Daly	Michael Parkinson	Brian Carney	Karolyn Joseph
1996-97	Maurice Daly	Michael Parkinson	Veronica Green	Karolyn Joseph
1995-96	Maurice Daly	Peter Carney/Michael Parkinson	Veronica Green	Michael Ormsby

== Life Members ==
Year	Name (* Deceased)
2023	Cheryl Daly
2022	Annette Moran
2017	John Mison
2016	Christopher Grant, Janice Morris
2010	David McDowall, Michael Parkinson
2008	Richard Ormsby, Terry Parkinson, Robin Parkinson
2004	Keith Little*
2000	Judith Flett, Tim Green
1995	Hazel Brombey, Ron Brombey*, Peter Court, Noeline Daly, Geoffrey Gately*, Veronica Green*
1988	Peter Carney, Brian Carney
1984	Maurice Daly*

== See also ==
- List of swim clubs
