= Bogey Hole =

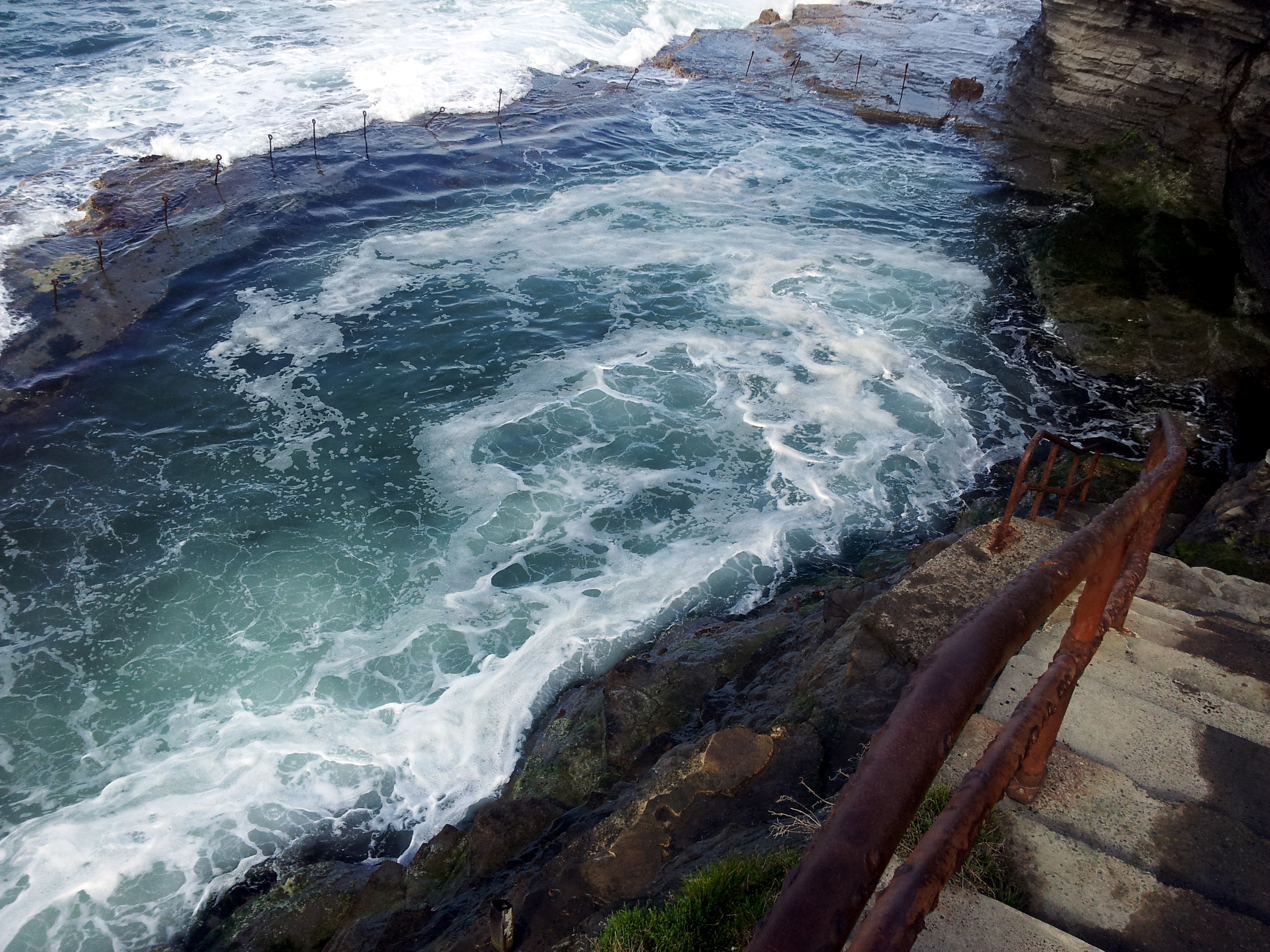
- The Bogey Hole in 2011

- Location within New South Wales Location within Australia
- 32.9351°S 151.7817°E
- Location: Shortland Esplande, Newcastle, City of Newcastle, New South Wales, Australia

History
- Built: 1819–1884

Site notes
- Owner: Newcastle City Council

New South Wales Heritage Register
- Official name: Bogey Hole, The; The Bogey Hole; Commandant's Baths; Bogie Hole
- Type: state heritage (landscape)
- Designated: 21 November 2003
- Reference no.: 1678
- Type: Swimming Pool – tidal
- Category: Urban Area
- Builders: Convict labour, 1819/20; enlarged to present dimensions by Newcastle Borough Council, in 1884

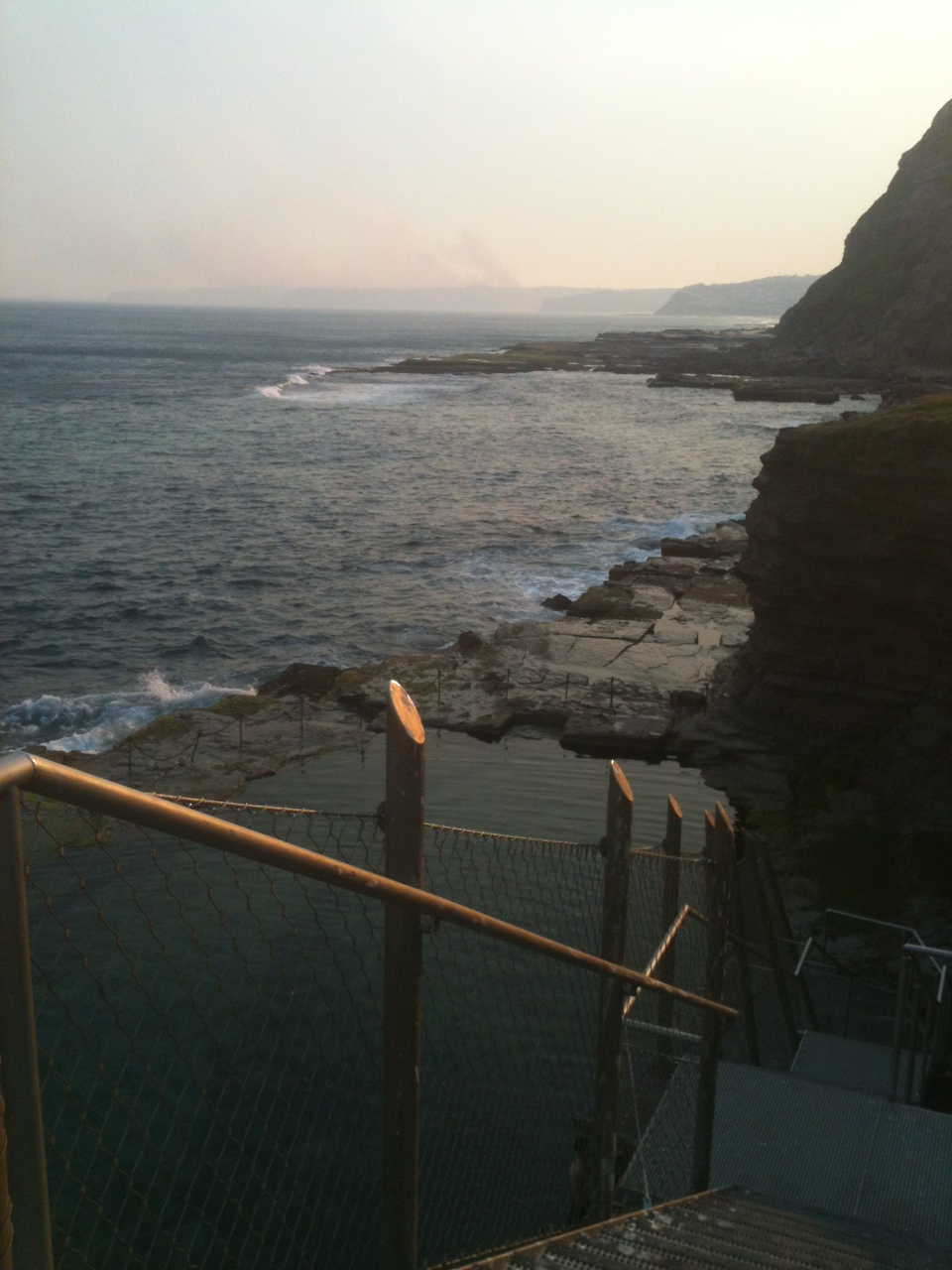
October 2013

The Bogey Hole, also known as the Commandant's Baths, is a heritage-listed sea bath in Newcastle in New South Wales, Australia. It is thought to be the oldest surviving European construction in the city area. The pool was hewn from a sandstone/conglomerate rock shelf at the base of cliffs near Shepherds Hill. Lieutenant-Colonel James Thomas Morisset, the Commandant of Newcastle (1818–23), ordered the construction of the pool by convict labour in about 1820 for his own use.

The word "Bogie" or "Bogey" purportedly comes from the Dharawal language meaning "to bathe" or "a place to bathe"

It was added to the New South Wales State Heritage Register on 21 November 2003.

== History ==
The Bogey Hole is located beneath a pseudo headland or prominence and gets battered in heavy seas. Local dare-devils often tempt fate by climbing the cliff and jumping into the Bogey Hole. It is only about 1.5 m. deep. Another local thrill is to grab the barrier chains on the seaward side of the baths in a moderate swell and hang on tight when a wave breaks over you. Audrey Reay remembers that "The Bogey Hole was the best place for a dip, but dangerous in bad weather. When the tide was very high and weather rough it was a most delightful place if you could get safely in and out - to a moderate or indifferent swimmer it was hard to get out without a few scratches.".

The Bogey Hole was constructed by order of Commandant Morisset in about 1820 for personal use. Whether this work represented the enlargement of a naturally occurring rock pool used by Aboriginal people is unknown. There is no exact date for the commencement of construction nor is there a record of how long it took. Morisset was Commandant of Newcastle from December 1818 until November 1823. He was the longest serving Commandant of Newcastle. It was known originally as the "Commandant's Baths". The name "Bogey Hole" was applied afterwards and is said to come from the Dharawal word meaning "to bathe".

The Bogey Hole is situated at the foot of Shepherds Hill, or as it was known in the 1820s "sheep pasturage hill". Geologically, the rock in the area is sandstone/conglomerate typical of the coastal areas of the Hawkesbury Sandstone deposit on which Newcastle was built. The rock is considered reasonably hard. In 1863, control of the bath passed to Newcastle Borough Council for public use. The baths were enlarged by Council and catered mainly to male swimmers, with women being permitted only at set times. Since that time a collection of changing sheds and other facilities have come and gone. The Bogey Hole was originally much smaller than it is now and was substantially enlarged in 1884 to its present size.

The most significant changes to the original Bogey Hole rock pool were in 1884. The pool was enlarged to seven times its original size and deepened, an iron safety rail was constructed along the access track and two bridges, stairs and ledges cut into the rock face. These works were undertaken by Newcastle City Council.

"The time to see the pool in all its glory was in the morning, when the sun stood high over the sea. Boys gathered there as if by magic, playing naked the whole forenoon. The rocks were warm, and slippery with salt spray. By that time the chill was burned out of the water; crowds of young urchins ducked and ran screaming before the onslaught of each wave from the heart of the Pacific. Great games were carried on among the breakers; certain daring boys climbed out along the sea-wall, hanging there by the chain-rail, and holding their breath as the crests of rollers passed over them in a smother of foam. The hot sun streaming into the caves among the upper ledges make pleasant retreats for the exercise of confidence and speculation. The waters of the pool sparked with ocean clearness and purity. Lithe white bodies gleamed in the dark ground of the rock in statuesque and charming attitudes. The deep blue color of the ocean filled the eye. Flocks of dazzling sea-birds wheeled above the outlying reefs. The noise of the surf mingled happily with the clamor and shrill cries of boyhood at play...And hour by hour, as we played, ships passed on the face of the sea in stately procession under the steady glow of the sun." -- Lincoln Colcord in 1914, reflecting on his adventures at Bogie[sic] Hole in 1895 as a 12-year-old accompanying his parents around the world in a Maine (USA)-based freight sailing ship

Men and women swam on different days and new dressing sheds and showers to use water piped 150 yards from a natural spring were built in 1893. Despite improvements, the rock pool was not considered safe or respectable enough bathing site for the good citizens of Newcastle. "Newcastle Morning Herald" commented that the "Bogey Hole has become the aquatic hunting ground of the Newcastle larrikin". The alternative was to swim at Newcomen Street Corporation Baths, which was plagued by complaints about cleanliness.

There have been minor modifications to the Bogey Hole Baths since. These affected mainly the area above the baths, including post-war construction of the caretaker's cottage, removal of the original timber change sheds, removal of a timber picket fence, and alterations to access steps and ordinance fencing. A brick changing shed was built in 1953.

The Bogey Hole remains a popular spot, particularly for inner city dwellers who don't like getting sand in their shoes, and still becomes very crowded on warm summer days.

The Bogey Hole was temporarily closed in September 2003 after Council noticed a number of boulders had crashed 20m from the cliff into the swimming hole, which had damaged fencing and created instability in the cliff face above the Bogey Hole. In 2004 the Newcastle Morning Herald reported that the Bogey Hole "had reopened following completion of stabilisation work above the popular swimming spot".

The baths are currently managed by the New South Wales government who undertook a project in 2012 to restore safe access through the provision of a new platform and stairs. The Bogey Hole was closed in 2003 over rock falls and again in 2014 after damage by heavy swells. It reopened in 2016 after a $490,000 rock-bolting project had been completed.

Local Greek Orthodox Churches have used the Bogey Hole for a traditional Blessing of the Waters since the 1950s. On the first Sunday after the Greek Epiphany, members of church offer prayers "for the safety of all people working at the sea". The priest blesses the waters below, from the cliff face, before local young people jump in the water to try and collect a metallic cross that has been submerged in the Bogey Hole.

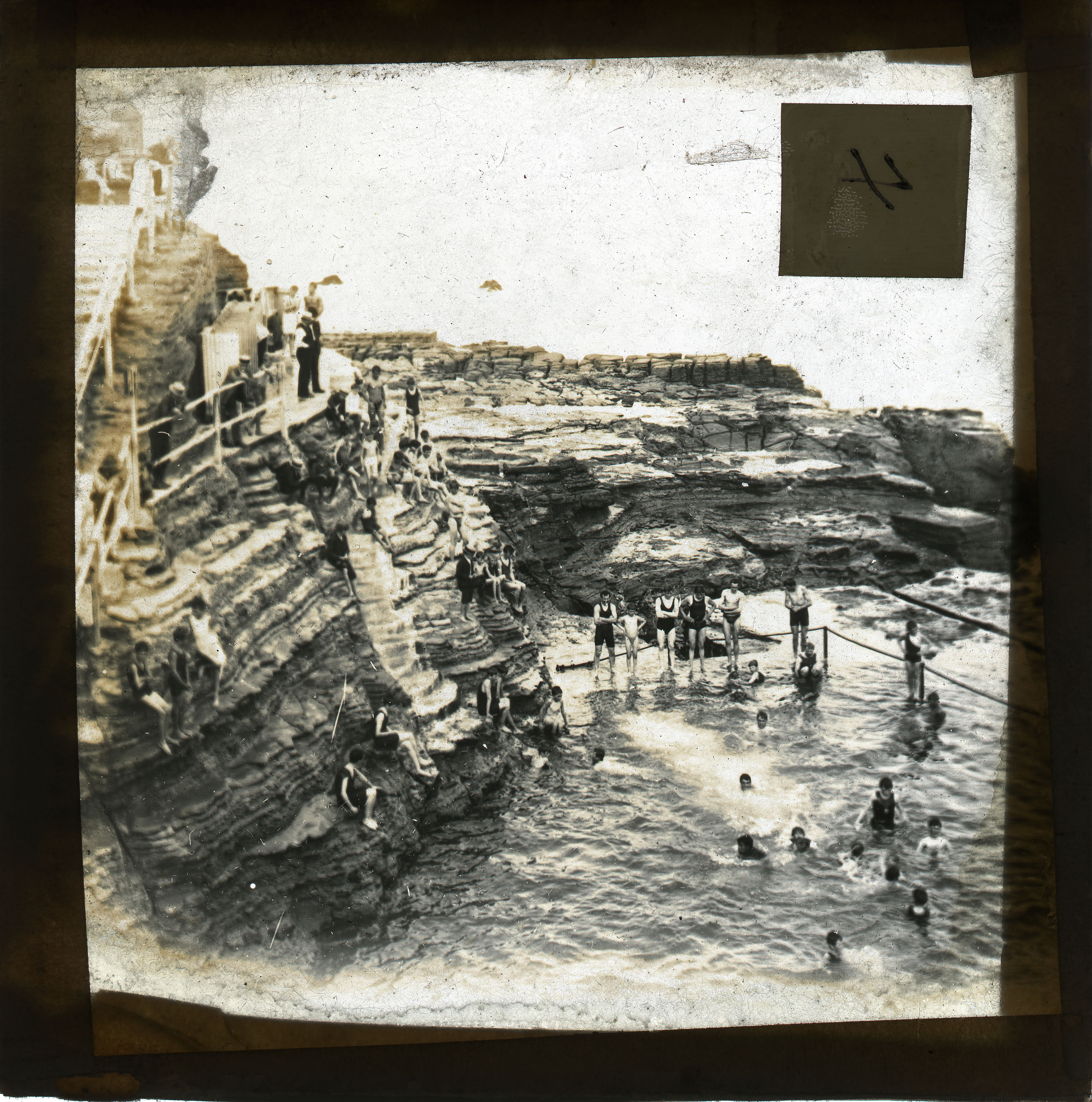
Swimmer at the Bogey Hole, Newcastle, New South Wales. n.d.

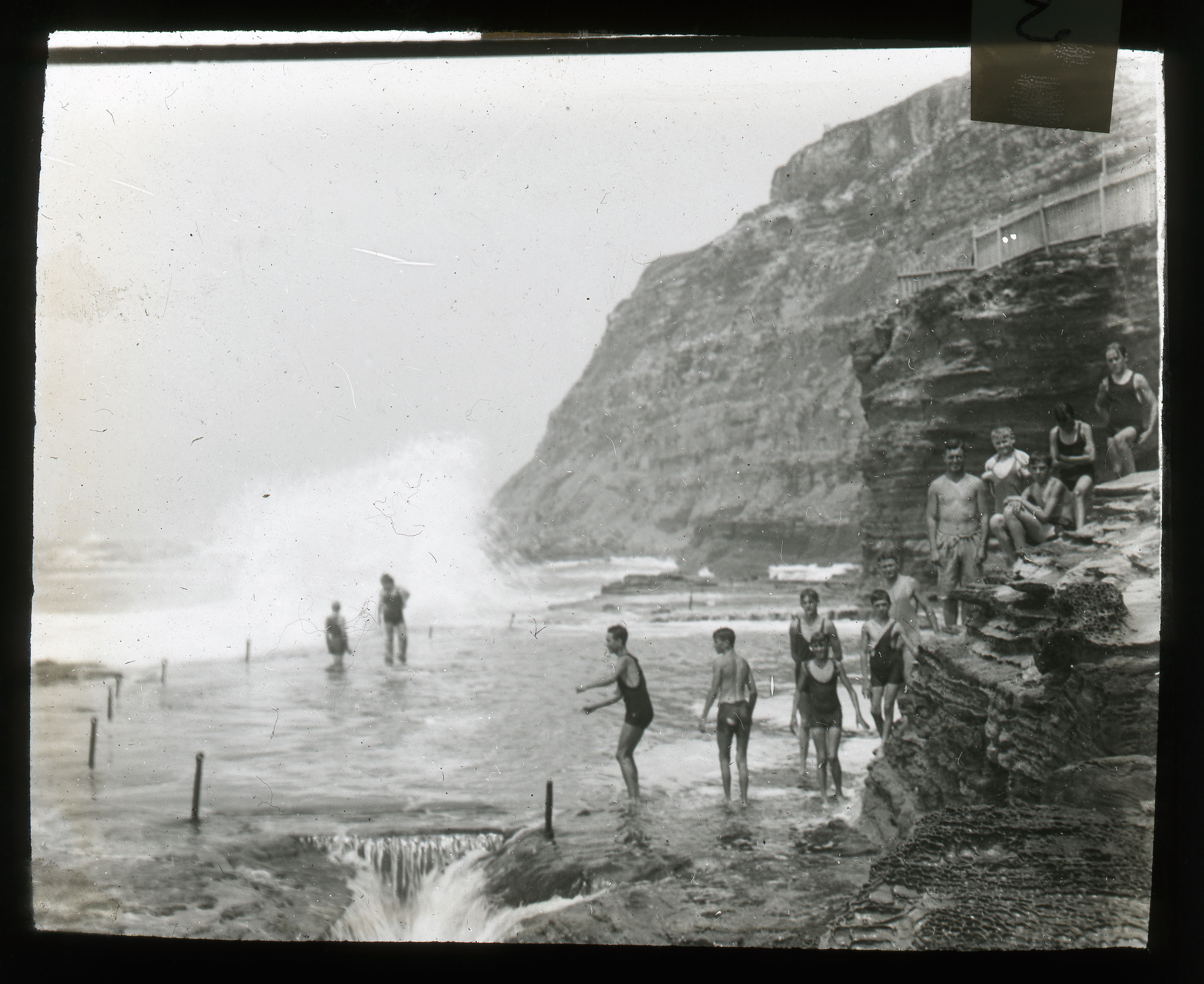
Bogey Hole, Newcastle, New South Wales

== Description ==
The Bogey Hole is a public baths hewn out of rock on a wave cut platform below the cliffs at Shepherd Hill. The dimensions of the baths are length (maximum) 10 metres x width (maximum) 6.5 metres, with an average depth of 1.5 metres.

It was reported to be in good physical condition as at 2003. It retains its 1884 form.

Various weatherboard sheds and a brick toilet block were added over time, but all have since been demolished. The seaward side is fenced with stanchion and chain, date unknown.

The Bogey Hole is currently incorporated into a public walk called "Bathers' Way", for which a Bathers' Way Masterplan has been prepared by Council and some interpretative signage installed. There is a proposal to commission and install some piece of commemorative public art in the cliff top picnic area overlooking the pool.

== Incidents ==
The Welsh poet and lecturer at the University of Newcastle T. Harri Jones drowned in the pool while swimming in January 1965.

On 2 January 1881, a young woman named Annie Leonard nearly drowned in the pool; "...she was wading in the water barefooted, and fell into an excavation known as Bogey Hole..." She was then rescued, with difficulty, by a local man named James Dimond.

In 2003, a 41-year-old man drowned after being washed off the rocks.

On 26 January 2010, 26-year-old Nathan Luke of Gateshead died at the Bogey Hole after he hit his head on a submerged rock.

== Heritage listing ==
One of the two remaining constructed features from the days of the earliest European settlement in Newcastle, probably the earliest European-built work extant, it is a convict constructed baths hewn out of a rock face for Major James Morisset, a notable military figure from the early period of European settlement in Australia. The Bogey Hole is the first recorded European purpose-built ocean pool on the NSW coast. It forms a picturesque and interesting feature in the coastal landscape of King Edward Park and is of considerable social significance to the people of Newcastle.

Bogey Hole was listed on the New South Wales State Heritage Register on 21 November 2003 having satisfied the following criteria.

The place is important in demonstrating the course, or pattern, of cultural or natural history in New South Wales.

The Bogey Hole is one of the two remaining European-made structures from the days of the earliest European settlement in Newcastle, probably the earliest European-built structure extant, it is a rare item, being a convict constructed baths, dating from between 1819 and 1891.

The place has a strong or special association with a person, or group of persons, of importance of cultural or natural history of New South Wales's history.

The Bogey Hole is associated with Commander James Morisset who ordered it dug for his private use, and with the earliest period of convict labour at the settlement.

The place is important in demonstrating aesthetic characteristics and/or a high degree of creative or technical achievement in New South Wales.

The Bogey Hole and its natural setting are distinctive and pleasing features of the King Edward Park foreshore and a popular subject for contemporary artists and photographers. The pool itself is an interesting example of early convict workmanship, as modified by subsequent enlargement.

The place has strong or special association with a particular community or cultural group in New South Wales for social, cultural or spiritual reasons.

The Bogey Hole recalls the early period of military privilege and convict servitude. In the 1850s it was a venue of segregated bathing. (The Ladies' Bathing Place was at the south end of Newcastle Beach.) Swimming at the Bogey Hole features in Audley Reay's "Memories of the Hunter and Newcastle in the 1880s". Today, the Bogey Hole and its steep cliff-face form a noted local landmark. It is said to be of particular significance to "local daredevils" who "often tempt fate by climbing the cliff and jumping into the Bogey Hole."

The place has potential to yield information that will contribute to an understanding of the cultural or natural history of New South Wales.

The Bogey Hole has the potential to demonstrate early convict excavation techniques as well as subsequent Council modifications. The social significance of the Bogey Hole to identifiable groups merits further investigation.

The place possesses uncommon, rare or endangered aspects of the cultural or natural history of New South Wales.

The Bogey Hole is rare by virtue of its early date (1819). There are no known swimming venues in NSW constructed earlier.

The place is important in demonstrating the principal characteristics of a class of cultural or natural places/environments in New South Wales.

Geologically, the rock in the area is sandstone/conglomerate typical of the coastal areas of the Hawkesbury Sandstone deposit on which Newcastle was built. The Bogey Hole is the first Australian representative of the tradition of associating particular bathing facilities as being for users of a special class.
