= Bondi Icebergs Club =

Swimming club in Sydney, Australia

Coordinates: 33.895134°S 151.27434°E

Bondi Icebergs Swimming Club
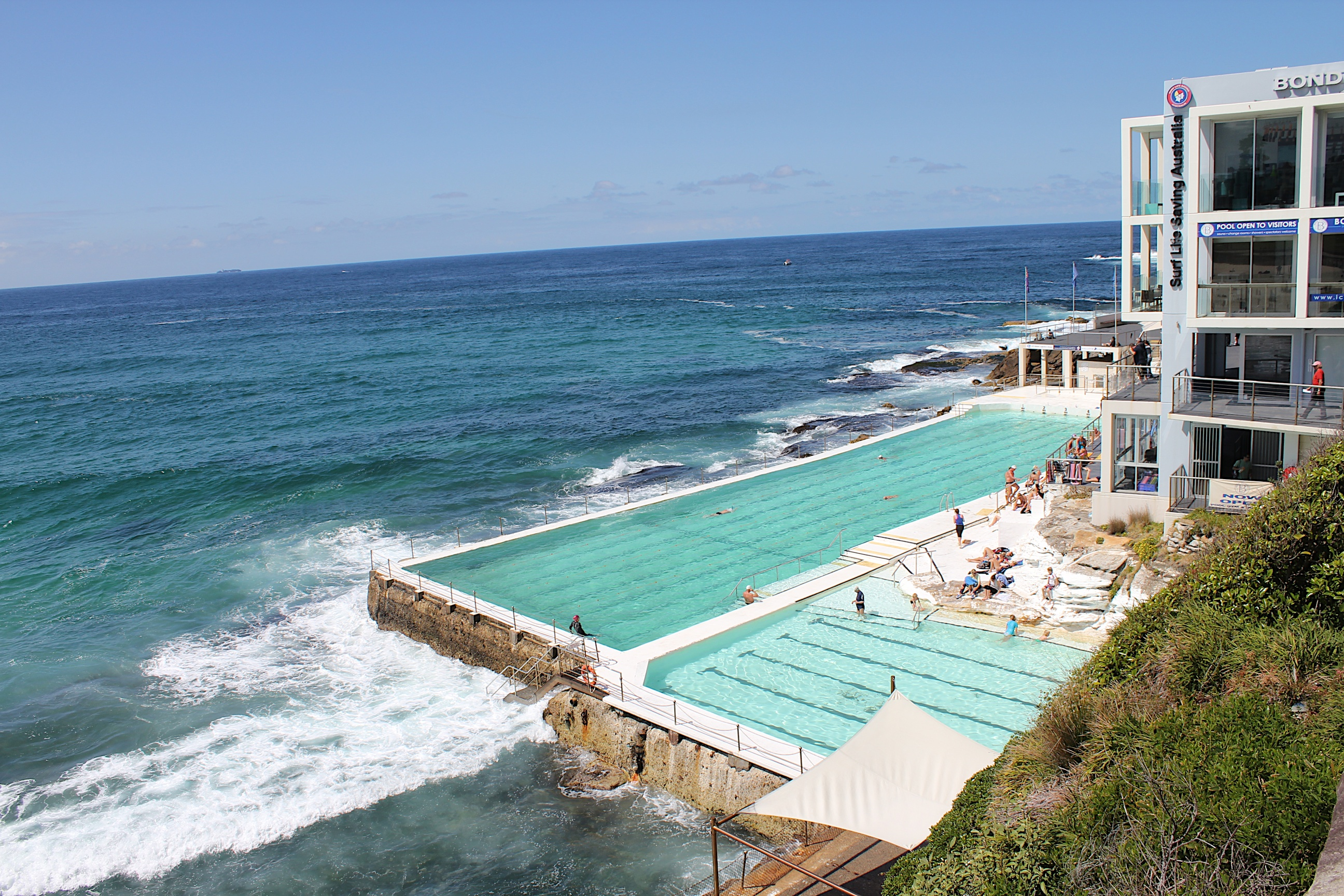
- Bondi Baths, a swimming pool managed by the Bondi Icebergs Swimming Club
- Interactive map of Bondi Icebergs Swimming Club
- Location: Bondi Beach, Sydney, New South Wales, Australia
- Type: Tidal pool with associated winter swimming club
- Facilities: Sauna; museum; licensed club

Construction
- Opened: 1929

Website
- icebergs.com.au

The Bondi Icebergs Swimming Club is an Australian winter swimmers club, located at the southern end of Bondi Beach in Sydney, New South Wales. The swimming club was established in 1929 and has a small museum on the first floor. A defining characteristic of the Club is a rule that to maintain membership it was mandatory that swimmers compete on three Sundays out of four for a period of five years.

Water Polo by the Sea is held there every year by Australian Water Polo, with the Australia men's national water polo team taking on various international all star teams.

The Bondi Icebergs Club was a location for a Jim Beam advertisement.

The Bondi Icebergs Winter Swimming Club compete against Cronulla Polar Bears Winter Swimming Club, South Maroubra Dolphins Winter Swimming Club, Clovelly Eskimos Winter Swimming Club, Maroubra Seals Winter Swimming Club, Coolangatta Surf Life Saving Club, Coogee Penguins Winter Swimming Club, Bronte Splashers, Wollongong Whales and Cottesloe Crabs in the Winter Swimming Association of Australia Championships.

== In popular culture ==
The Pool is a 2024 documentary about the Bondi Icebergs pool.

== See also ==
- Surf lifesaving
- Surf Life Saving Australia
- List of Australian surf lifesaving clubs
- Ocean pools in Australia
