= Frank Jordan (cricketer) =

Australian cricketer (1905–1995)

Personal information
- Born: 19 September 1905; Darlington, New South Wales, Australia
- Died: 22 October 1995 (aged 90); Vaucluse, New South Wales, Australia
- Source: ESPNcricinfo, 2 January 2017

Frank Jordan (19 September 1905 – 22 October 1995) was an Australian cricketer. He played six first-class matches for New South Wales between 1927/28 and 1928/29.

== See also ==
- List of New South Wales representative cricketers
