= City of Southampton Swimming Club =

Swimming club in Hampshire, England

Club information
- Full name: City of Southampton Swimming Club
- Short name: CSSC
- City: Southampton, England
- Founded: 1963
- Home pool(s): The Quays Swimming & Diving Complex

Swimming
- Head coach: Matt Heathcock

The City of Southampton Swimming Club is the major swimming club in Southampton, Hampshire in the United Kingdom and is currently based at The Quays Swimming & Diving Complex near Westquay.

== History ==
The club was founded in 1963 and was one of the earliest members of the UK's National Swimming League. It celebrated its fiftieth anniversary in May 2014.

The club has been National League winner on five occasions and Regional Division winner on fourteen.

== Membership ==
As of 2022 the club has approximately 250 members ranging from 5 years to masters, who compete at local, county, regional and national competitions.

Notable former members include:

- Gary Abraham, Olympic and Commonwealth Games medallist who is a current coach
- Keith Bewley, triple Commonwealth Games medallist
- Ricky Burrell, Olympian and triple Commonwealth Games medallist
- Colin Cunningham, Olympian and three times Commonwealth Games medallist
- Dave Haller, Olympian
- Alan Kimber, European medallist
- Malcolm O’Connell, Olympian
- Ray Terrell, seven times Commonwealth Games medallist

== Coaches ==
The current head coach is Matt Heathcock who himself trained at Southampton when his father David Heathcock was the coach.

Current assistant coaches include Gary Abraham (ex Olympian), Paul Dollery, Mark Taylor, Aislinn Murphy and Brooke Wilkinson.

Notable former coaches include:

- Derek Snelling (founder) 1963
- Dave Haller (Olympian) 1967
