= Woollahra House =

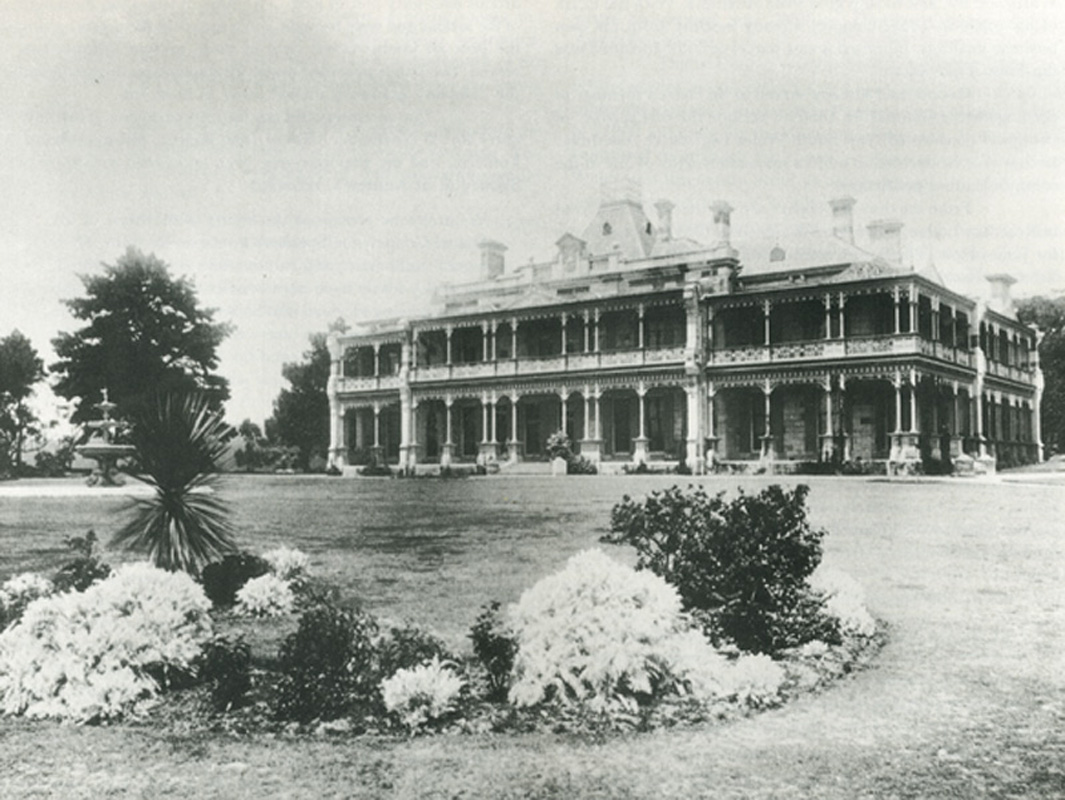
- The second Woollahra House, c. 1885, built in 1883 by William Charles Cooper

- Location within inner Sydney

General information
- Type: Mansion
- Location: Point Piper, New South Wales, Australia
- Coordinates: 33°51′57″S 151°15′14″E
- Completed: 1856
- Client: Sir Daniel Cooper (1856); William Charles Cooper (1883)

Woollahra House refers to two mansions built on the same site in Point Piper, Sydney, New South Wales, Australia. The first house was built in 1856 by Sir Daniel Cooper and the second by his son, William Charles Cooper, in 1883. Both houses have been demolished, but two buildings still remain from the original structure. The gatekeeper's lodge from Sir Daniel Cooper's house, which was built in 1871, is now the Rose Bay Police Station, and the stables which are now Wyuna Court, a prestigious block of apartments.

== History ==
=== Sir Daniel Cooper ===
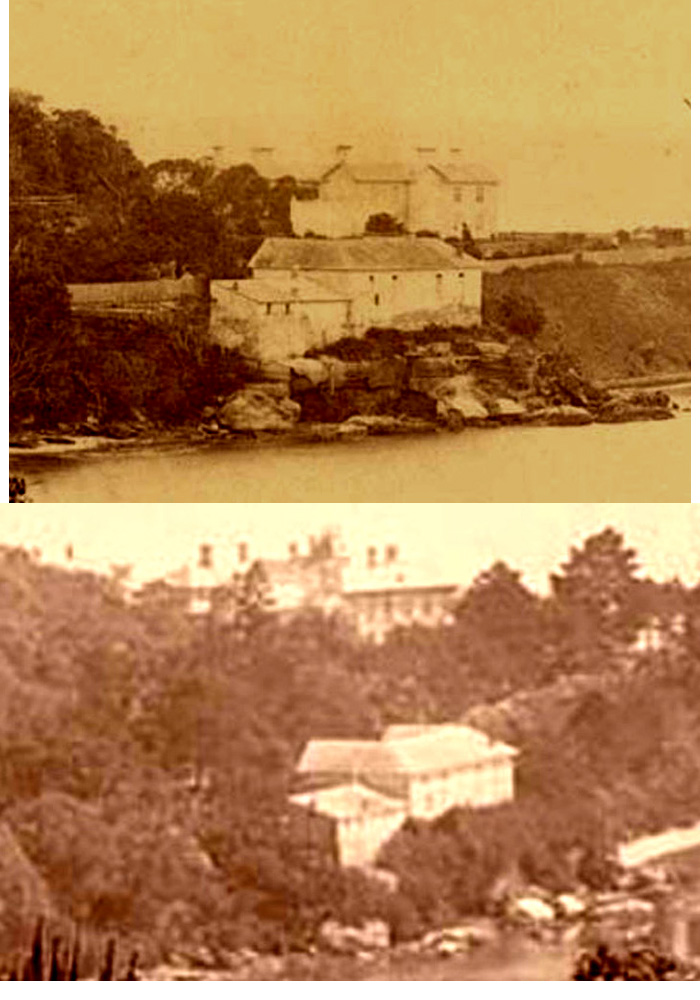
The two houses called Woollahra House. The top photo shows the first house built in 1856 by Sir Daniel Cooper, and the bottom photo, with the same outbuildings in the foreground but a larger house in the background, shows the second Woollahra House built in 1883 by William Charles Cooper.

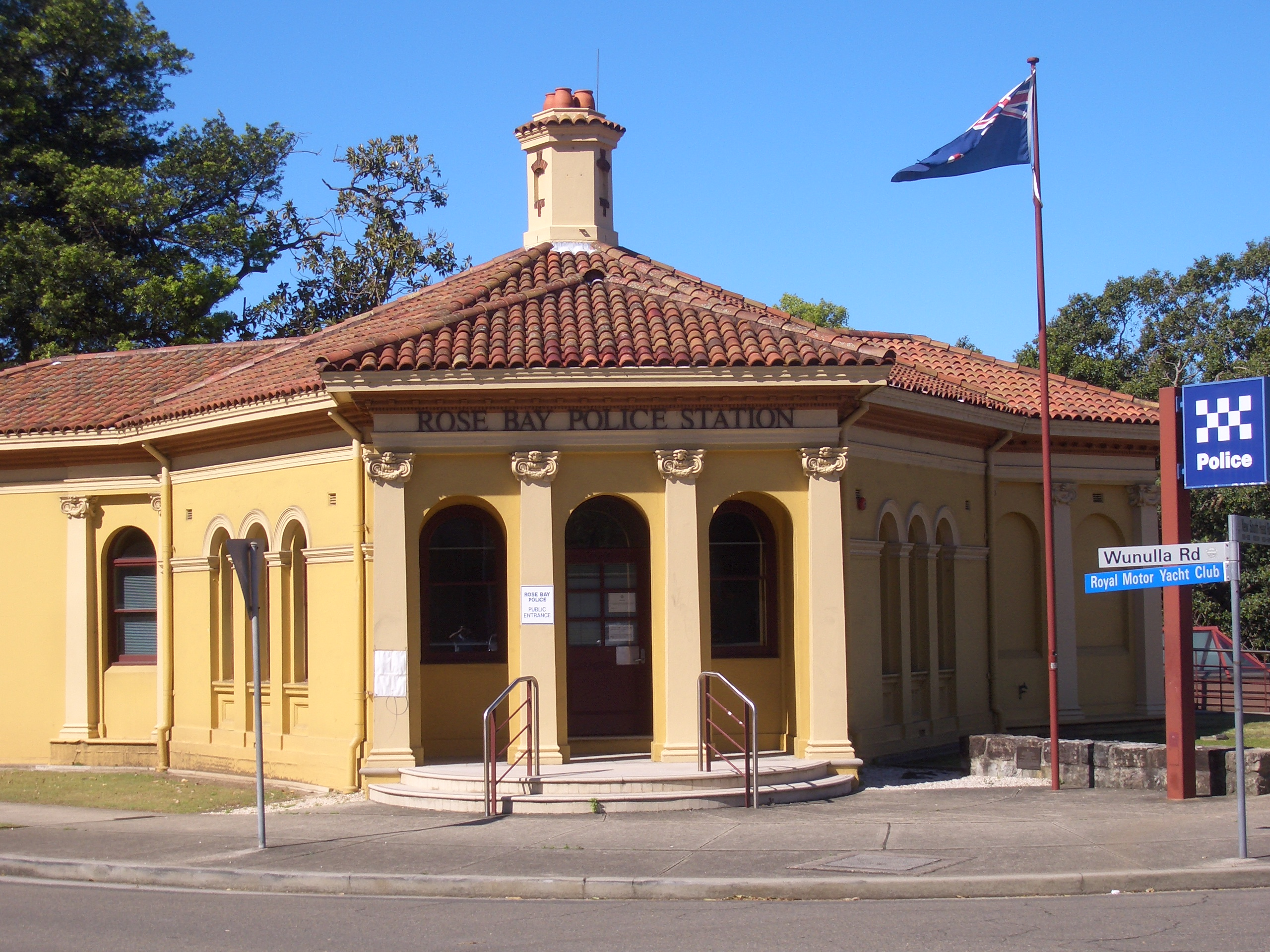
Rose Bay Police Station

Daniel Cooper was born in 1821 in Lancashire, England. He was the second son of Thomas Cooper, a merchant and came to Australia as a child with his parents. He returned to England at the age of 14 to complete his education but came back to Australia in 1843 and became a commercial partner with James Holt. He later became a member of Parliament and was elected as Speaker of the New South Wales Legislative Assembly. In 1846 he married Elizabeth Hill, who was the third daughter of William Hill of Sydney. Over the next thirteen years while they lived in Sydney, the couple had two sons and five daughters.

In 1856 Cooper started building Woollahra House, and to mark the occasion he held a very large ceremony to lay the foundation stone, at which 400 guests were present. While the house was being built, the Coopers lived in the nearby residence called Rose Bay Lodge, also owned by Cooper. It is not certain when the Cooper family moved into Woollahra House, although it was before 1860 as there is a birth notice for a son born at Rose Bay Lodge in July 1860 to the wife of Walter Lamb, who were known to be renting the Lodge at about this time.

Cooper sailed to England with his family in 1861 and did not return. Cooper retained ownership of Woollahra House for the next 22 years while he lived in England. Anthony Trollope during his visit to Australia in 1873 made the following observations about the original Woollahra House:

"Woollahra is a magnificent property covered with villa and gardens, all looking down to the sea. In England it would be worth half a million of money."

— Anthony Trollope, 1873

=== Edward Smith Hill ===
Edward Smith Hill was the brother in law of Sir Daniel Cooper. He came to Woollahra House in 1862 and stayed there until his death in 1880. His obituary of 1880 says that he resided at Woollahra House for the last 18 years. Hill was the brother of Daniel Cooper's wife, Elizabeth, and of George Hill (1802–1883) who was the Mayor of Sydney in the 1850s.

Hill was born in 1819 in Sydney. His parents were William Hill and Mary Johnson, who had both been convicts and had subsequently acquired wealth through business. In 1844 Hill married Mary Ann Pye, the eldest daughter of Joseph Pye Esq., of Eastern Creek. Hill became a wine and spirit merchant, and by the time he moved into Woollahra House he had retired and become a naturalist. He wrote several papers on flora and fauna and was interested in geology. Hill died after a long illness at Woollahra House in 1880, survived by his widow, Mary.

=== William Charles Cooper ===
William Charles Cooper was born in 1851 in Sydney. He was the second son of Daniel Cooper, who built the first Woollahra House. His mother was Elizabeth Hill, the third daughter of William Hill Esq of Sydney. When he was only one year old he inherited a great deal of property from his great uncle, Daniel Cooper and this was held in trust for him until he came of age in 1872.

In 1876 Cooper married Alice Helen Hill, and they had three sons and one daughter. In 1882 Cooper purchased the original Woollahra House from his father, Sir Daniel, and in 1883 the foundation stone was laid by Mrs William Cooper for the second Woollahra House. While the house was being constructed the Coopers lived at nearby Kambala, then owned by Walter Lamb. While he was in Sydney Cooper had an interest in horseracing and owned several notable racehorses. He was elected committeeman of the Australian Jockey Club in 1887, but in the following year he resigned as the family decided to live in England. Although he left Sydney in 1888 William Cooper retained ownership of Woollahra House until 1899 and either rented it or allowed his friends and relatives to reside there for short periods.

=== Lady Isabella Martin ===
Isabella Martin was born in 1832 in Sydney; the eldest daughter of William Long, who owned Tusculum in Potts Point. Long was a wine and spirit merchant who had become very wealthy. In 1853 Isabella married Sir James Martin, a lawyer and later Premier of New South Wales and Chief Justice of New South Wales.

By the middle of the 1870s Lady Martin had given birth to 15 children. Sir James Martin had bought Clarens in Potts Point, but Lady Martin became increasingly dissatisfied with the house as her family grew, and it became too small for such a large number of children. She was also concerned about the location of the house. It was on Rushcutter's Bay, which at that time was associated with an outbreak of typhoid fever.

In 1880 and 1881 her sister and two of her children died and she became increasingly concerned about the health of her family. She had inherited considerable wealth from her father, who had set up a Trust Fund for her in his will. In 1882 she left her husband and, with her own wealth, rented houses further away from the central part of Sydney. The first house she rented was Greycliffe, Vaucluse, and the Sands Directory shows that she stayed there until 1889, when she moved to Woollahra House. At this time the house was still owned by William Cooper, who had moved to England. The Sands Directory shows that she rented Woollahra House from 1889 until 1892. The beach at the front of the house was later named Lady Martin Beach in her honour.

=== Sir and Lady Paston-Cooper ===
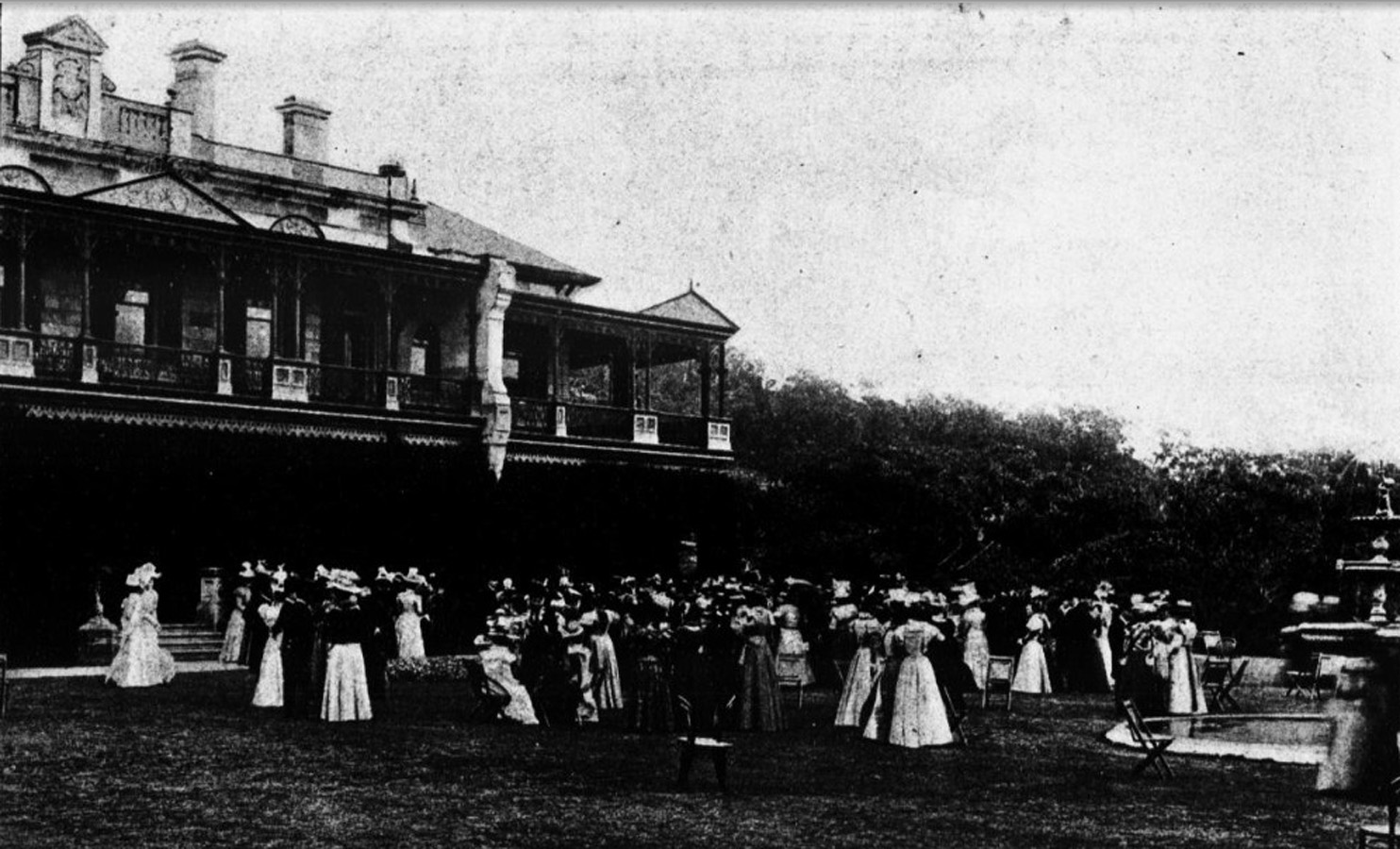
A garden party hosted by Lady Paston-Cooper at Woollahra House in 1897, as published in The Sydney Mail.

Sir and Lady Astley Paston-Cooper were English and they lived at Woollahra House during a visit to Australia from 1896 until 1898. They frequently appeared in the social columns of the Sydney newspapers because they liked to entertain. The Sydney Mail gave the following description of a garden party held at Woollahra House in 1897:

The Woollahra House grounds are so pretty that to those who visited the place for the first time the charm of the situation appealed very strongly. Lady Cooper was assisted in her reception duties by the Hon. Mrs. Ferguson and also by Sir Astley Paston Cooper and was exceedingly kind in looking after the pleaure of her guests, who must have numbered over 200. A tent was erected on one of the terraces of the lawn, where everyone regaled themselves with delicious strawberries and crem, a luxury that seems one of the chief attractions of garden fetes. Tea and dainty sweets were served in the ballroom which was generously decorated with masses of arum lilies and the choicest of other blossoms.

— The Sydney Mail

In 1898 William Cooper decided to live in England permanently. In 1899 the estate, which at that time was 16 hectares (40 acres), was subdivided and put on the market. Woollahra House retained two hectares (five acres) of this area. A description of the house was advertised as follows:

This splendid residence is built of stone and contains the following large accommodation. On the ground floor a delightful drawing-room, attractive library, morning-room, study and gentleman’s room, superior dining-room, magnificent wide hall leading to the handsome and attractive ballroom and splendid billiard-room. On the first floor there are eleven bedrooms besides drawing-room, boudoir, linen rooms, servants sleeping rooms and several bathrooms. The mansion is two stories in height, and verandahs and balconies are extensive and wide. The out conveniences are numerous and include large stone stable, coach houses, man's rooms etc and domestic offices.

— Advertisement, The Sydney Morning Herald, May 1899.

=== Thomas Longworth ===
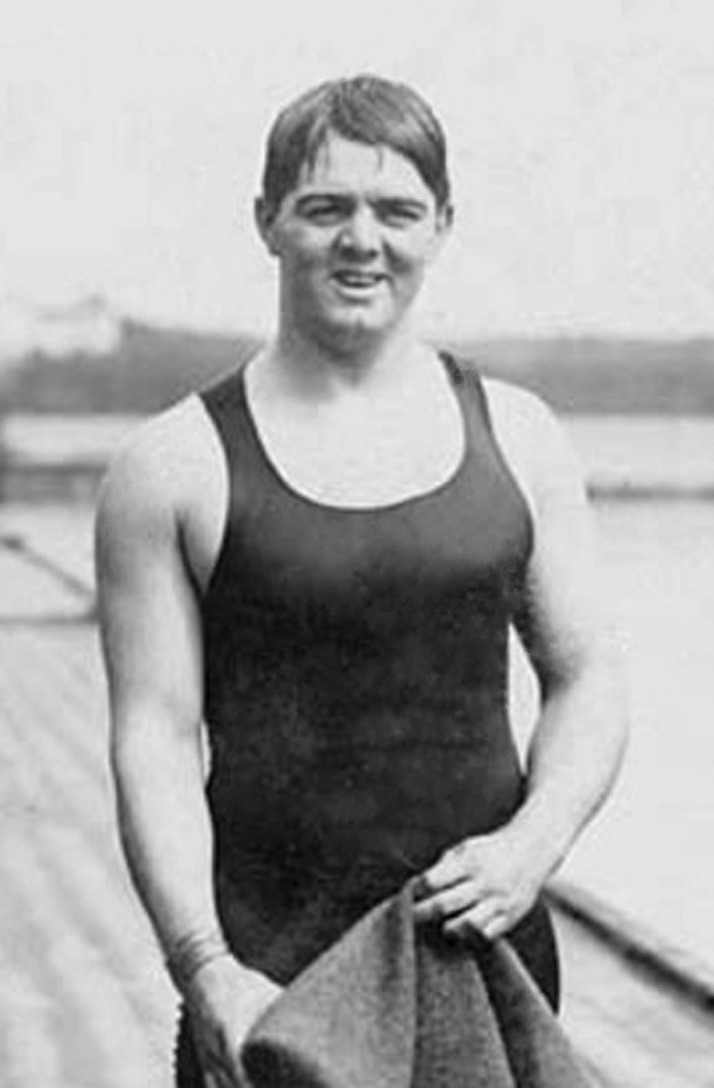
William Longworth (1892–1969), the son of Thomas Longworth, competed in the 1912 Olympic Games while a resident of Woollahra House.

Thomas Longworth bought Woollahra House in 1899 and lived there until his death in 1927. Longworth lived in Woollahra House longer than any other resident. Born in 1857 in Newcastle, his parents were Thomas Longworth and Rose Gardiner, who were from the Channel Islands. Longworth worked in a coal mine, first in Newcastle and then in Singleton when the family opened their own small mine there. In 1884 he married Frances Nowlan and over the next twenty years they had a family of seven sons and two daughters. One of their sons, William was a very good swimmer, and while he was a resident of Woollahra House, competed at the 1912 Olympic Games.

In 1894 Longworth became a member of the Great Cobar Mining Syndicate which reopened the Cobar Copper Mine and considerably expanded and improved it. In 1908 this syndicate founded the Australian Woollen Mills in Marrickville, and Longworth was the chairman until 1927. During World War I the mill produced large quantities of khaki for the 1st Australian Imperial Force. Longworth also had interests in brickworks, potteries, timber-mills and pastoral properties and accumulated considerable wealth. While Longworth owned Woollahra House he furthered his interest in racehorses and owned, with his brother, several notable thoroughbreds. He also built a steam yacht called Cobar for use on Sydney Harbour. Longworth died at Woollahra House in 1927.

In 1929 the house was sold to a business group who subdivided and sold the land and marketed the house as a site "for demolition and removal within four months of the date of sale".

== Surviving buildings ==
The gatekeeper's lodge of Woollahra House still survives and is now the Rose Bay Police Station. The other substantial part which remains is the stables which were converted to the prestigious apartments of Wyuna Court. James Haydon Leslie Arnott, CEO Arnott's Biscuits, bought the old stables, converted them and lived there until he died in 1931.{Sydney Morning Herald, Thursday 26 February 1931 page 13 also, NSW Death Certificate states Mr Arnott died at Wyuna Court, his residence}

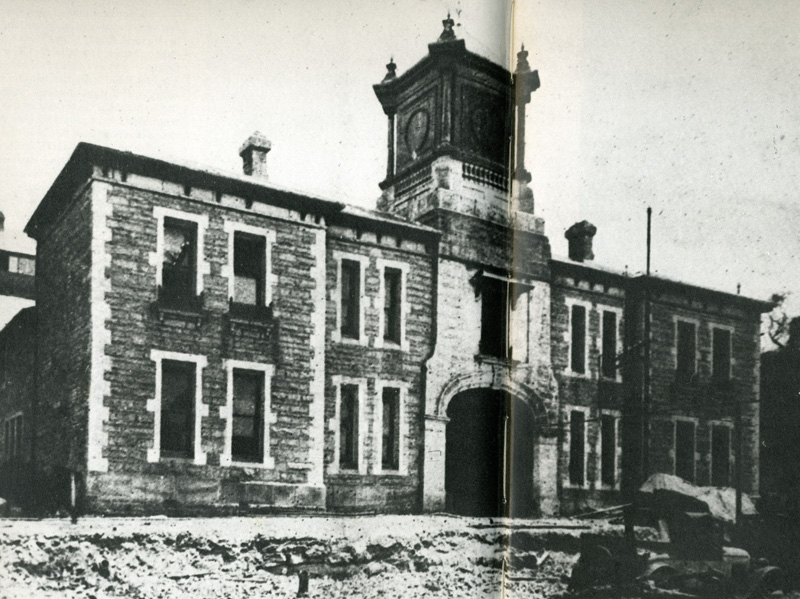
Stables at Woollahra House, 1929

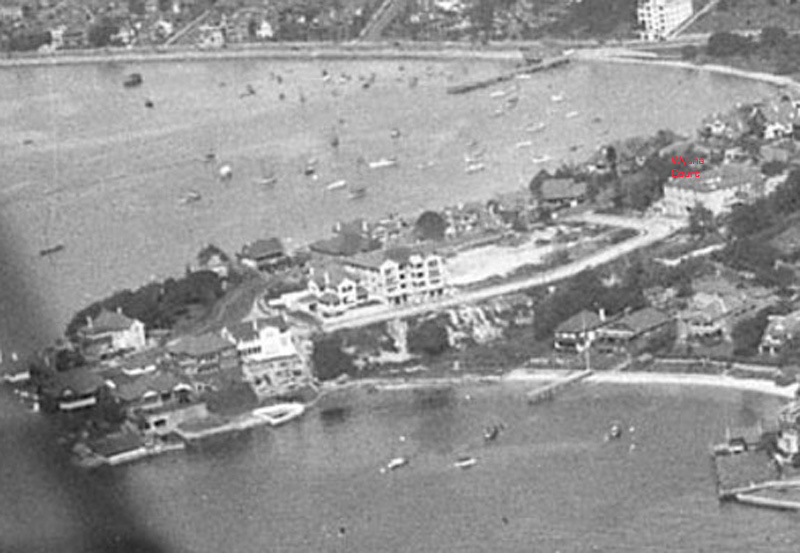
Aerial photo showing Wyuna Court (labelled) and the still bare demolition site of Woollahra House, 1931
