= Salisbury Court (Rose Bay) =

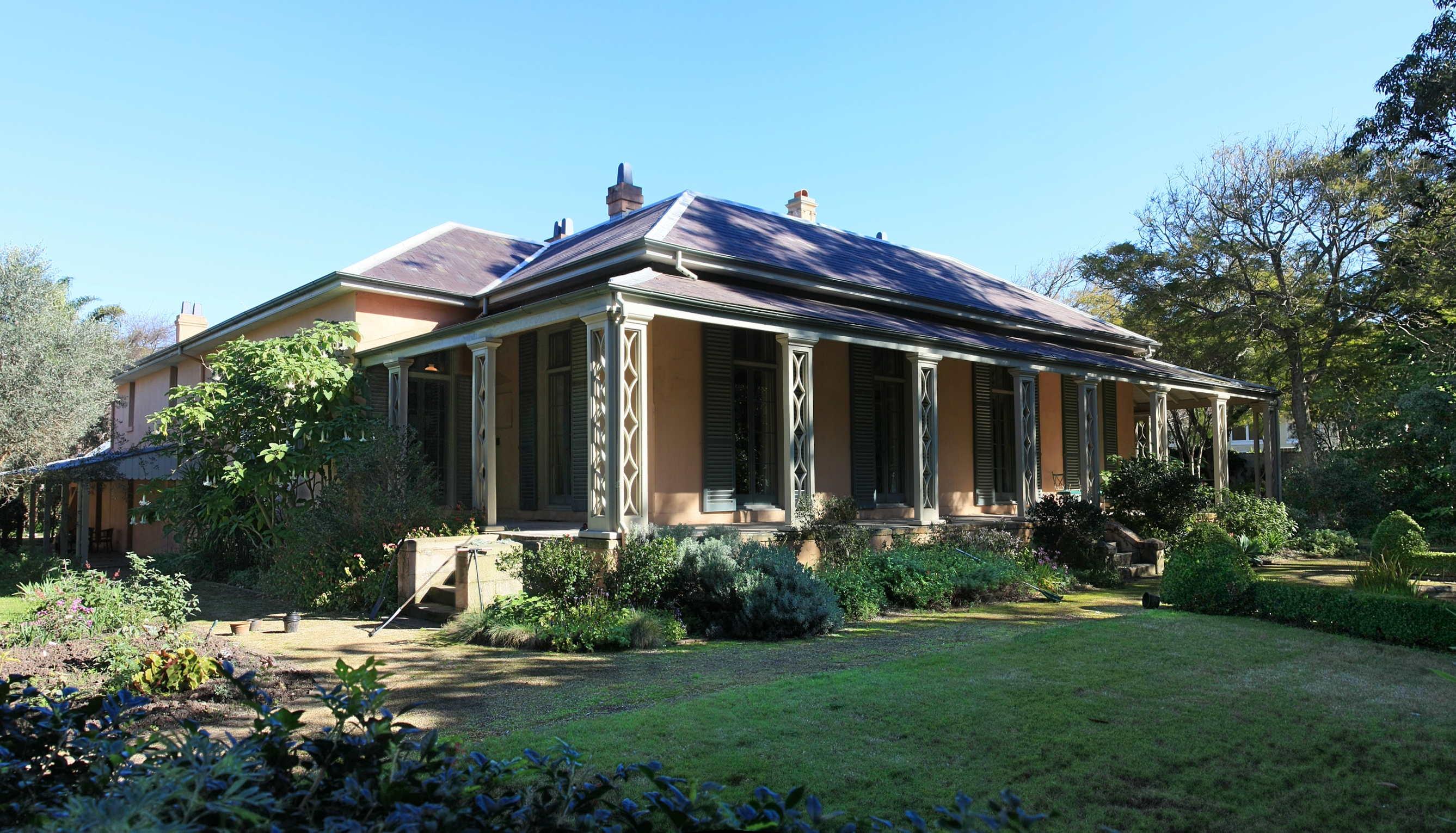
- A restored Salisbury Court, or Rose Bay Cottage, pictured in 2010.

- Location within Sydney Location within Australia
- 33°52′22″S 151°15′26″E
- Location: 1–7 Salisbury Road, Rose Bay, Sydney, Australia

History
- Built: 1834–1915

Site notes
- Architect: John Verge (original cottage)

New South Wales Heritage Register
- Official name: Salisbury Court; Rose Bay Lodge; Rose Bay Cottage
- Type: State heritage (built)
- Designated: 2 April 1999
- Reference no.: 251
- Type: Homestead building
- Category: Residential buildings (private)

Salisbury Court is a heritage-listed residence and former apartment building, homestead, kitchen garden and garden at 1–7 Salisbury Road, Rose Bay in Sydney, Australia. The original cottage was designed by John Verge and built from 1834 to 1915. It is also known as Rose Bay Lodge and Rose Bay Cottage. The property is privately owned. It was added to the New South Wales State Heritage Register on 2 April 1999. Rose Bay Lodge (originally known as Rose Bay Cottage) is the oldest surviving house in the Municipality of Woollahra.

== History ==
=== Rose Bay suburb ===
The house stands on part of 460 hectares (1,130 acres) originally granted to Daniel Cooper Snr (1785–1853) and Solomon Levey (1794–1833), founders of the firm Cooper & Levey, by a consolidated Crown grant of 22 March 1830. Originally the grant comprised ten grants promised by Governor Macquarie to various persons and afterwards was acquired by Captain John Piper, who in 1826 mortgaged these portions together with his "capital...mansion house" (Henrietta Villa, on Point Piper), its coach houses, stables and other buildings built on his adjoining 77-hectare (190-acre) grant called "Point Piper" to Cooper & Levey.

Following Piper's bankruptcy in 1826–27 all of these lands and others passed to Cooper & Levey, who in 1830 held in this area some 530 hectares (1,320 acres) of land stretching from Woollahra to Rose Bay most of which was then virgin bushland except for the area around Henrietta Villa. It bounded the harbour's edge at Double Bay travelling along a line approximately where today's Ocean Street is until it reached Old South Head Road and thence by that road to a point just beyond the present day Rose Bay and thence by a line to the harbour.

Apart from leasing the villa, Cooper & Levey did nothing to develop or improve their land. Levey left Sydney for London in 1826 and there in June 1829 he gave James Holt, a cousin of Daniel Cooper who had arrived in Sydney from London via Hobart Town in November 1825 with a capital of A£2,300 and had taken up a position in that firm, a limited power of attorney to deal with certain of Level's partnership assets. Subsequently, in June 1831 Cooper gave a similar power to Holt when he left Sydney in that year for London never to return to Australia. During their absence Holt acted as the firm's manager. In October 1833 Solomon Levey died and in the 1834 Cooper admitted into partnership Holt and Richard Roberts, the business to be conducted under the style and firm of Cooper Holt & Roberts.

=== Development of Rose Bay Cottage ===
Possibly feeling the need for a house away from the city, and the Waterloo Warehouse the firm's principal place of business, and no doubt in view of his impending admission to partnership in the firm, Holt instructed John Verge in September 1834 to prepare plans for "a cottage proposed to be erected at Rose Bay". In November 1834 the Sydney Gazette reported "Mr. Holt of the Waterloo Warehouse has commenced building a commodious residence near Point Piper; and Mr. Haydon of Sydney has also laid the foundation of a house farther on, on an elevated site which commands a delightful view of the harbour".

In April 1837 The Sydney Times reported "...Rose Bay (near Point Piper) and passing the pretty residence of Mr Holt, and Mr Hayworth's picturesque and romantically situated cottage, leaving Mr.William Charles Wentworth's charming villa of classic nomenclature Vaucluse, and Mr Horton James Boto Fogo...". That year Edward Baker Boulton did a number of pencil sketches of the area, some of which are thought to include this house.

=== Rose Bay Cottage as the residence of Sir Daniel Cooper ===
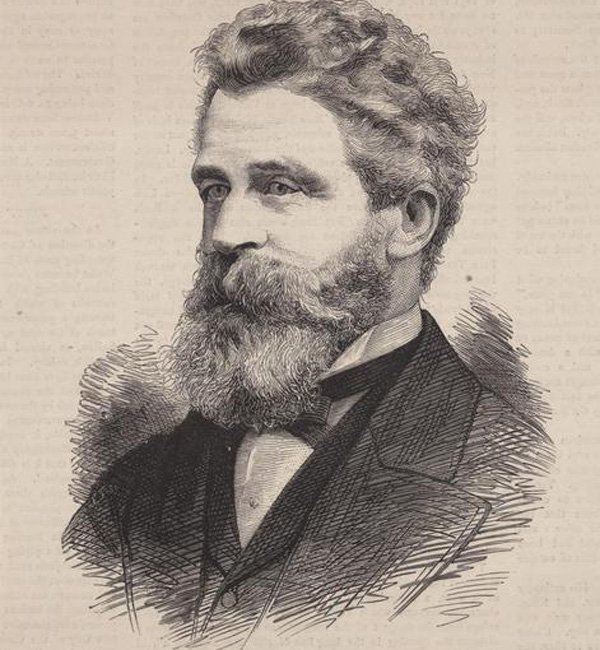
Sir Daniel Cooper.

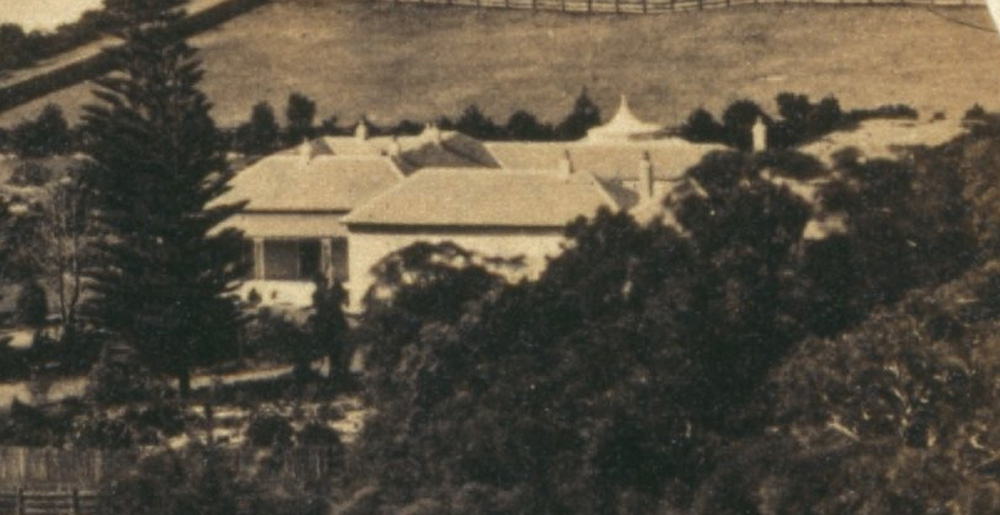
Rose Bay Cottage (then called Rose Bay Lodge) c. 1855 when it was owned by Sir Daniel Cooper.

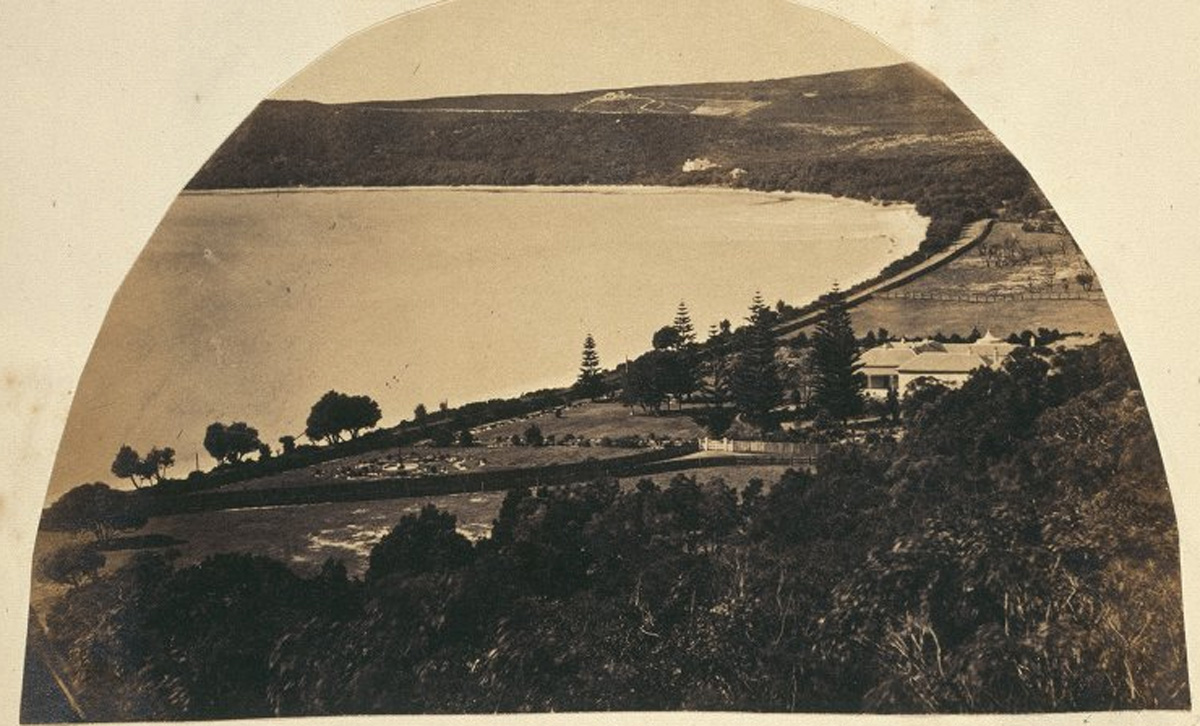
Rose Bay in 1855 showing Rose Bay Cottage, almost alone.

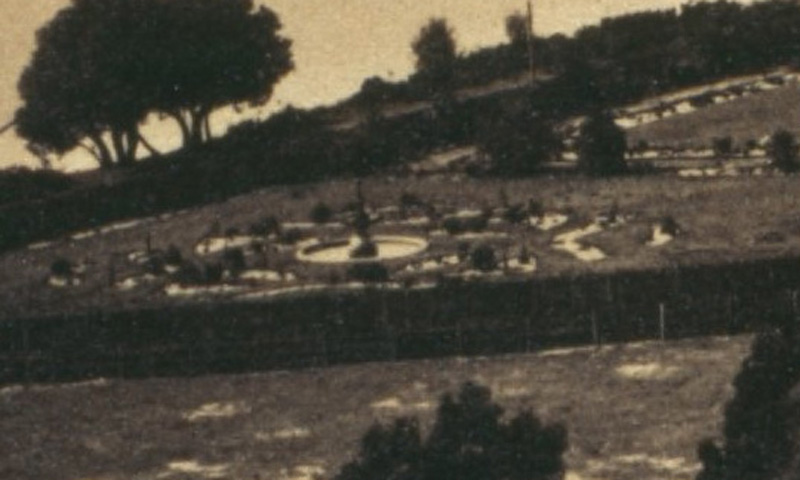
The fountain in the grounds of Rose Bay Cottage in 1855.

Holt apparently lived in the cottage until about 1843, the year in which Daniel Cooper Jnr. (later Sir Daniel) arrived in Sydney. That year also the estate of Solomon Levey was finally settled in England following a complicated and lengthy wrangle over the previous 10 years. Under this settlement Daniel Cooper eventually received Levey's half share in all the firm's real estate holdings in NSW which he settled on certain trusts for the benefit of his nephew Daniel Cooper (later Sir Daniel, of Woollahra House) and his nephew's male heirs. A the time of this settlement (December 1843) the whole of the 460-hectare (1,130-acre) grant was described as "occupied by a dwelling house erected thereon and about (blank) acres cleared and cultivated now or late in the possession of James Holt. The residue of this lying waste and unproductive". Following his marriage in September 1846 to Elizabeth Hill, sister of George Hill of Durham Hall, Surry Hills, it is thought Daniel Cooper Jnr. occupied the cottage from 1844–48 for it is said that in 1848 his eldest son, also Daniel, was born here.

Daniel Cooper was born in 1821 in Lancashire, England. He was the second son of Thomas Cooper, a merchant, and came to Australia with his parents while still a child. He returned to England at the age of 14 to complete his education, but came back to Australia in 1843 and became a commercial partner with James Holt. In the same year, he moved into Rose Bay Cottage as a bachelor but three years later, in 1846, he married Elizabeth Hill who was the third daughter of William Hill Esq of Sydney. The couple lived in the house until 1848. In the Sydney Morning Herald in March of that year, there was an advertisement stating that "Rose Bay Cottage", the residence of Sir Daniel Cooper was available to rent. James Moffitt (1802–1872) who was a notable stationer, bookseller and engraver, leased the house for 7 years. Sir Daniel Cooper returned to the cottage in 1855. There is a birth notice for a daughter to Mrs Daniel Cooper in the Sydney Morning Herald in August 1855. This time the cottage is referred to as "Rose Bay Lodge".

By this time, Sir Daniel Cooper was a member of Parliament and had been elected as Speaker of the New South Wales Legislative Assembly. He must have made some substantial improvements to the garden, as the photo of his house shows a fountain. Mr Francis Grundy, in his memoirs, made a note of Rose Bay Cottage. He said "Rose Bay and its one large low house, alone and its orderly grounds, crisp trim lawns and splashing fountain (is) where Sir Daniel Cooper once dispensed his generous hospitality'. A photograph of his house in 1855 showing its isolation in Rose Bay and a close up picture of the fountain referred to is shown below.

Sir Daniel Cooper lived at Rose Bay Cottage while his new house was being built nearby called Woollahra House. The next resident appears to be Walter Lamb as a birth notice is in the Sydney Morning Herald in July 1860 for a son born at "Rose Bay Lodge" to the wife of Walter Lamb. It is not certain how long Walter Lamb resided here but the Sands Directories show that Sir John Hay was in residence from 1866 until his death in 1892.

Daniel Cooper leased the cottage "known as Rose Bay Cottage formerly in the occupation of James Holt...and the plot of land called or known as the Bush Paddock..." to James Moffitt (1802–74) a noted stationer, bookseller and engraver of the period, for 7 years. The whole of this land was then enclosed by a "paling" or close fence. No express provision was contained in the lease permitting the lessee to make improvements and if any were made these became the property of the lessor. For this reason it is thought none were made. At the rear of the cottage on an adjoining separate piece of land of about 6 acres was a hut known as "Hargraves' Hut" and other buildings. These were occupied by John Hargraves, apparently an old retainer of the Cooper family who was granted a life tenancy of this area in 1849. After Hargraves left the land in c.1855 Sir Daniel Cooper used it during the building of Woollahra House (1856+) as his kitchen garden when he was in occupation of the house.

=== Rose Bay Lodge as the residence of Sir John Hay ===
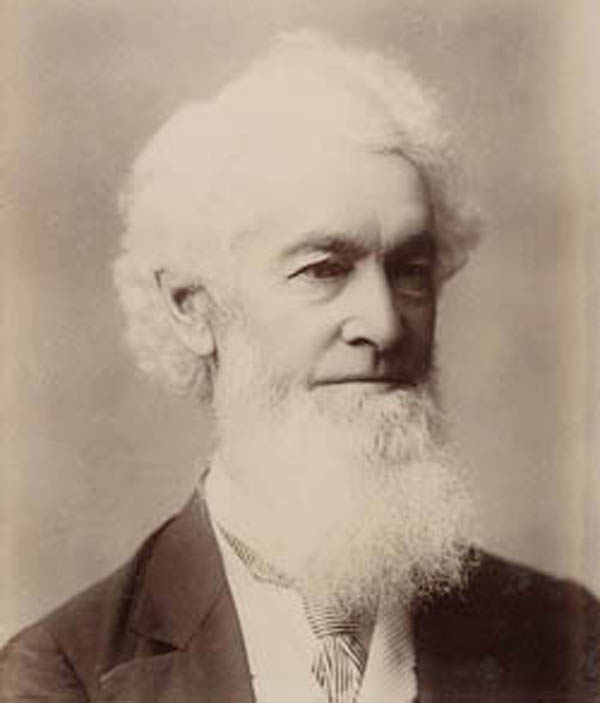
Sir John Hay, resident of Rose Bay Cottage between 1866 and 1892

It is thought Moffitt occupied the cottage until expiration of his lease and then Cooper and his family took up residence (1855–60?) during the building of Woollahra House. Cooper subsequently left Australia in 1861 and never returned permanently to reside there. The cottage subsequently became known as Rose Bay Lodge but it is not clear whether this was during Cooper's occupation of it at this time or later during Sir John Hay's long occupation. It is clear however from later plans that the additions and alterations to the cottage resulted in it being called Rose Bay Lodge. After Cooper vacated the house it is said to have been occupied for a short time by Walter Lamb (1825–1906) before Sir John Hay (1816–1892) took up a lengthy residence of it. The precise date of Hay's taking possession is unknown. His name appears on various maps from 1878–89 as occupant of Rose Bay Lodge and he died there in 1892. He is thought to have taken up residence here when he was appointed MLC in 1867.

Sir John Hay was born in 1816 in Scotland. In 1838 he married Mary Chalmers and soon after the couple sailed to Sydney. They settled in the Upper Murray and in partnership with his brother in law, James, became a very successful farmer. In 1856 he became a politician and represented several rural electorates in the Legislative Assembly of New South Wales and was elected as Speaker in 1862. He moved from the Legislative Assembly to the Legislative Council in 1867. When he became a politician in 1856 he lived in Sydney but it is not until 1866 that he is shown to be residing at Rose Bay Cottage in the Sands Directory.

Sir John Hay was a very keen gardener and may have further added to the garden at Rose Bay Cottage. He also owned some land not far from this house called "The Garden" which according to an advertisement was about 4 acres (1.6 ha) in size and was "laid out into gardens, ornamental grounds and on which is already erected a gardeners cottage." A related site in Double Bay (now called Overthorpe also listed on the NSW State Heritage Register) was the site was Sir John Hay's "garden" - an unusual listing in the 1880s Sands Directory at the time he resided at Rose Bay Lodge. This garden contained a gardener's cottage and is believed to have been the site of an Experimental Nursery. The selection of mature species suggests a possible link with William Guilfoyle's work (Guilfoyle was connected with the nearby Exotic Nursery at Double Bay). Overthorpe's magnificent specimens of great age and scale are testament to the 19th century passion for collecting and displaying rare and exotic trees.

Sir John and Lady Hay did not have any children and when they both died in 1892 his property was inherited by the children of his brother James. After Hay's death here the house, then on about 1.6 hectares (4 acres), was leased to Rosa Rougier, wife of Dr. Emile Rougier and she eventually purchased it in 1900.

=== Rose Bay Cottage as the residence of the Rougier family and subsequent ownership ===
The next resident of Rose Bay Cottage was Mrs Rosa Haigh. According to the Sands Directory she first came to Rose Bay Cottage in 1893. In 1895 she married Dr Emile Rougier who at that time was Director of the Pasteur Institute. The Rougiers liked to entertain and some of their social events are mentioned in the newspapers. For example, in July 1899 they held a luncheon for many notable guests including two Consuls-General. In 1902 they held a garden party in the grounds of Rose Bay Cottage. the Sydney Morning Herald reported the event as follows.

"The charming grounds of Rose Bay Lodge were quite en fete on Wednesday afternoon when Dr and Madame Rougier entertained a large number of guests at a garden party. Owing to the threatening aspect of the weather and the keen wind which was blowing, the guests were received in the drawing room and refreshments were served on the verandah, part of which was enclosed. The reception rooms were decorated with beautiful roses and lilac."

Rosa Rougier died in July 1910 at her residence in Paris. She left most of her property to her children two of whom are named as her executors in her will. These are Victor Louis Bosker Haigh and Ruth Grace Ann Haigh (married name Friedricks). Rose Bay Cottage was advertised for sale in February 1911. The ad contained a very detailed description of the house as follows.

"Rose Bay Lodge is situated in the centre of delightfully laid out grounds comprising an area of about seven acres and occupying one of the best positions in Rose Bay in close proximity to the tram and with extensive harbour views. The house itself is a commodious one of pleasing elevation and most substantially constructed of brick and stone, cemented and painted slate roof, verandahs on three sides and balcony on one side and contains hall, double drawing-room, billiard-room, eight bedrooms, three bathrooms, kitchen, laundry and large cellarage accommodation. Stabling built of stone comprising coachhouse, four stalls, loose box, loft, harness room and man's room. Detached from the main building is a weatherboard cottage, verandah in front containing three rooms"

The house was again put on the market later in the year. This time it was marketed as "Rose Bay Lodge Estate" which consisted of 37 allotments and the house which was to be sold separately on four allotments fronting Salisbury Road.

After Mrs Rougier's death in c. 1910, the property was subdivided and put up for sale at auction in October 1911. At this sale Victor Louis Bosker Haigh, barrister and Grace Ann Friedericks, married woman, purchased the house and its present grounds. Subsequently, they sold it to Leah Abrahams in 1912 and after her death in c. 1951 it was transferred to Muriel Deborah Quirk, Alma Madeline Marks and Vera Gwendoline Hinde in equal shares.

=== Deterioration and restoration of the house ===
The house was bought in 1912 by a woman who converted it into the Ritz Flats. Over the next 70 years, the building was added to unsympathetically so that by the 1980s it was completely unrecognisable. A story and picture in The Sydney Morning Herald illustrates this.

In 1973 Quirk sold her share to Dorothy Muriel Gulson then of 33 Fairweather St., Bellevue Hill and in 1970 following the death of Hinde her share was vested in Enid Daphne Grevis of North Bondi.

=== Heritage conservation ===
In early 1983 a Heritage Council inquiry was held under section 41 of the Heritage Act 1977 on a proposal for making a permanent conservation order over the property, after its owners objected. Evidence was submitted at the inquiry that confirmed the heritage significance of Rose Bay Cottage and that the main building could be attributed to architect John Verge. However, because of the condition of the building and the alterations that had been made to it, the owners claimed that they would suffer financial hardship if an order was made and that this would render the cottage incapable of reasonable or economic use. Following a conference between the parties, Commissioner Dr. Alan Gilpin adjourned proceedings to enable further investigations on alternative uses for the building.

The Heritage Council considered four options for the use of the site to permit an economic form of development and retain and restore the original cottage. These were a retirement village, conference centre, restaurant in a garden setting and professional office suites. Manager of the Heritage Branch Merv Shearman said he was pleased the owners were working with the Heritage Council on a solution. An approach was made to Woollahra Council to gain support for changing the use of the property and if necessary rezoning the site as incentive to the owners to undertake restoration. It was hoped the possibility of a range of new use options would attract a purchaser with the necessary resources to undertake the conservation works required.

Rose Bay Lodge (originally known as Rose Bay Cottage) contains the oldest surviving house in Woollahra. The earliest section of the house was constructed in 1834 from a design by architect John Verge. In terms of the general quality of his work, Verge is widely recognised as the most accomplished architect practising in Australia before 1850. Several of the architectural details surviving at Rose Bay Lodge (plaster cornices, French door details) are typical of Verge's work.

The earliest section of Rose Bay Lodge was a single storey colonial verandahed cottage villa in a suburban situation. Its subsequent additions provide an excellent example of how a colonial house expanded to suit the needs of those who lived there. Most of the original planning of the house and its various additions is evident and much of the detailing remains.

In 1993, the house was bought by Peter Bracher who engaged the architect Alan Croker of Design 5 Architects and the builder, Peter Harris, to restore Rose Bay Cottage. They did this by using, as much as possible, the original materials which were still substantially included in the house.

In December 2015 Woollahra Municipal Council's Mayor, Toni Zelzer, and the Chair if its Plaques Committee unveiled a new bronze footpath plaque outside Rose Bay Cottage to commemorate Sir Daniel Cooper. Cooper was the first elected Speaker of the New South Wales Legislative Assembly in 1856 and a generous philanthropist, contributing to the relief of widows and children of soldiers killed in the Crimean war. He was knighted by patent on 18 July 1857 and created Baronet of Woollahra in 1863. He was made a Knight Commander of St. Michael and St. George (KCMG) in 1880 and Knight Grand Cross of the Order of St. Michael & St. George) GCMG) in 1888. The name he gave to his new house at Point Piper, "Woollahra" (House), was adopted by the new municipality when it was formed in 1860.

== Description ==
Originally part of 460-hectare (1,130-acre) grant of 22 March 1830. Originally this comprised ten grants promised by Governor Macquarie to various persons and afterwards acquired by Captain John Piper, who in 1826 mortgaged these portions together with his "capital...mansion house" (Henrietta Villa, on Point Piper), its coach houses, stables and other buildings built on his adjoining 77-hectare (190-acre) grant called "Point Piper" to Cooper & Levey.

Following Piper's bankruptcy in 1826-7 all of these lands and others passed to Cooper & Levey, who in 1830 held in this area some 1320 acres of land stretching from Woollahra to Rose Bay most of which was then virgin bushland except for the area around Henrietta Villa. It bounded the harbour's edge at Double Bay travelling along a line approximately where today's Ocean Street is until it reached Old South Head Road and thence by that road to a point just beyond the present day Rose Bay and thence by a line to the harbour.

Apart from leasing the villa, Cooper & Levey did nothing to develop or improve their land. Levey left Sydney for London in 1826 and there in June 1829 he gave James Holt, a cousin of Daniel Cooper who had arrived in Sydney from London via Hobart Town in November 1825 with a capital of 2300 pounds and had taken up a position in that firm, a limited power of attorney to deal with certain of Level's partnership assets. Subsequently, in June 1831 Cooper gave a similar power to Holt when he left Sydney in that year for London never to return to Australia. During their absence Holt acted as the firm's manager. In October 1833 Solomon Levey died and in the 1834 Cooper admitted into partnership Holt and Richard Roberts, the business to be conducted under the style and firm of Cooper Holt & Roberts.

Possibly feeling the need for a house away from the city, and the Waterloo Warehouse the firm's principal place of business, and no doubt in view of his impending admission to partnership in the firm, Holt instructed John Verge in September 1834 to prepare plans for "a cottage proposed to be erected at Rose Bay". In November 1834 the Sydney Gazette reported "Mr. Holt of the Waterloo Warehouse has commenced building a commodious residence near Point Piper; and Mr. Haydon of Sydney has also laid the foundation of a house farther on, on an elevated site which commands a delightful view of the harbour".

In April 1837 The Sydney Times reported "...Rose Bay (near Point Piper) and passing the pretty residence of Mr Holt, and Mr Hayworth's picturesque and romantically situated cottage, leaving Mr.Wentworth's charming villa of classic nomenclature Vaucluse, and Mr Horton James Boto Fogo...". That year Edward Baker Boulton did a number of pencil sketches of the area, some of which are thought to include this house.

Holt apparently lived in the cottage until about 1843, the year in which Daniel Cooper Jnr. (later Sir Daniel) arrived in Sydney. That year also the estate of Solomon Levey was finally settled in England following a complicated and lengthy wrangle over the previous 10 years. Under this settlement Daniel Cooper eventually received Levey's half share in all the firm's real estate holdings in NSW which he settled on certain trusts for the benefit of his nephew Daniel Cooper (later Sir Daniel, of Woollahra House) and his nephew's male heirs. A the time of this settlement (12/1843) the whole of the 460-hectare (1,130-acre) grant was described as "occupied by a dwelling house erected thereon and about (blank) acres cleared and cultivated now or late in the possession of James Holt. The residue of this lying waste and unproductive".

Following his marriage in September 1846 to Elizabeth Hill, sister of George Hill of "Durham Hall", Surry Hills, it is thought Daniel Cooper Jnr. occupied the cottage from 1844–48 for it is said that in 1848 his eldest son, also Daniel, was born here.

Daniel Cooper leased the cottage "known as Rose Bay Cottage formerly in the occupation of James Holt...and the plot of land called or known as the Bush Paddock..." to James Moffitt (1802–74) a noted stationer, bookseller and engraver of the period, for 7 years. The whole of this land was then enclosed by a "paling" or close fence. No express provision was contained in the lease permitting the lessee to make improvements and if any were made these became the property of the lessor. For this reason it is thought none were made. At the rear of the cottage on an adjoining separate piece of land of about 6 acres was a hut known as "Hargraves' Hut" and other buildings. These were occupied by John Hargraves, apparently an old retainer of the Cooper family who was granted a life tenancy of this area in 1849. After Hargraves left the land in c. 1855 Sir Daniel Cooper used it during the building of Woollahra House (1856+) as his kitchen garden when he was in occupation of the house.

It is thought Moffitt occupied the cottage until expiration of his lease and then Cooper and his family took up residence (1855–60?) during the building of Woollahra House. Cooper subsequently left Australia in 1861 and never returned permanently to reside there. The cottage subsequently became known as Rose Bay Lodge but it is not clear whether this was during Cooper's occupation of it at this time or later during Sir John Hay's long occupation. It is clear however from later plans that the additions and alterations to the cottage resulted in it being called Rose Bay Lodge.

After Cooper vacated the house it is said to have been occupied for a short time by Walter Lamb (1825–1906) before Sir John Hay (1816–1892) took up a lengthy residence of it. The precise date of Hay's taking possession is unknown. His name appears on various maps from 1878–89 as occupant of Rose Bay Lodge and he died there in 1892. He is thought to have taken up residence here when he was appointed MLC in 1867.

After Hay's death here the house (then on about 4 acres) was leased to Rosa Rougier, wife of Dr.Emile Rougier and she eventually purchased it in 1900.

Subsequently, after Mrs Rougier's death in c. 1910, the property was subdivided and put up for sale at auction in 10/1911. At this sale Victor Louis Bosker Haigh, barrister and Grace Ann Friedericks, married woman, purchased the house and its present grounds. Subsequently, they sold it to Leah Abrahams in 1912 and after her death in c.1951 it was transferred to Muriel Deborah Quirk, Alma Madeline Marks and Vera Gwendoline Hinde in equal shares.

In 1973 Quirk sold her share to Dorothy Muriel Gulson then of 33 Fairweather St., Bellevue Hill and in 1970 following the death of Hinde her share was vested in Enid Daphne Grevis of North Bondi.

Rose Bay Lodge (originally known as Rose Bay Cottage) contains the oldest surviving house in Woollahra. The earliest section of the house was constructed in 1834 from a design by architect John Verge. In terms of the general quality of his work, Verge is widely recognised as the most accomplished architect practising in Australia before 1850. Several of the architectural details surviving at Rose Bay Lodge (plaster cornices, French door details) are typical of Verge's work.

The earliest section of Rose Bay Lodge was a single storey colonial verandahed cottage villa in a suburban situation. Its subsequent additions provide an excellent example of how a colonial house expanded to suit the needs of those who lived there. Most of the original planning of the house and its various additions is evident and much of the detailing remains.

=== Modifications and dates ===
- 1834 original single storey cottage.
- 1848 additions by Cooper – large house which became known as Rose Bay Lodge. Two double storeyed rear wings linking what appears to be the original stable and a small cottage to the main house.
- c. 1900 major additions
- 1910 subdivided
- date? unsympathetic additions made converting the original single storey cottage into two storeys. The house now (1981) on four lots, is divided into approximately 12 flats.
- c. June 1995: Eastern wing returned to its 1915 configuration. Garden (to street/east) reinstated based on historic research - plan by Michael Lehany with James Broadbent, Michael Cook and the owner's input.

== Heritage listing ==
As at 26 May 2011, Rose Bay Lodge is the oldest surviving house in what was historically Woollahra. From 1855 to 1861 it was the family home of the Coopers, who owned the Woollahra Estate and gave Woollahra its name. It is associated with Sir Daniel Cooper Bt. Speaker of the first Legislative Assembly in New South Wales and first baronet of Woollahra. It is associated with Sir John Hay, an eminent New South Wales M.P. of the second half of the nineteenth century.

Salisbury Court was listed on the New South Wales State Heritage Register on 2 April 1999 having satisfied the following criteria.

The place is important in demonstrating the course, or pattern, of cultural or natural history in New South Wales.

Rose Bay Lodge is the oldest surviving house in what was historically Woollahra.

The place has a strong or special association with a person, or group of persons, of importance of cultural or natural history of New South Wales's history.

From 1855 to 1861 it was the family home of the Coopers, who owned the Woollahra Estate and gave Woollahra its name. It is associated with Sir Daniel Cooper Bt. Speaker of the first Legislative Assembly in New South Wales and first baronet of Woollahra. It is associated with Sir John Hay, an eminent New South Wales M.P. of the second half of the nineteenth century. It is associated with other people of importance including Daniel Cooper Sen., Solomon Levey, James Holt, William Moffit and Walter Lamb and the Lloyd Bros.

The place is important in demonstrating aesthetic characteristics and/or a high degree of creative or technical achievement in New South Wales.

It is a rare extant example of a pre 1840s single storey colonial verandahed cottage villa of consequence built in a suburban situation. It is a sophisticated example of a colonial cottage villa and has refined detailing.

The original house was designed by John Verge, a prominent architect is Sydney during the 1830s and is characteristic of his work in both planning and detailing.

it was once a landmark on the southern shore of Sydney Harbour.

It retains a very small portion of its traditional outlook over the harbour.

The bell mechanism is a rare extant example of the first half of the nineteenth century.

The place has potential to yield information that will contribute to an understanding of the cultural or natural history of New South Wales.

The remains of the fountain are those of one of the earliest fountains in Sydney to be built in a private garden.

The place possesses uncommon, rare or endangered aspects of the cultural or natural history of New South Wales.

It is a rare example of a pre 1840s house in Sydney still retaining its domestic wing and service courtyard.

It is a rare extant example of a single storey cottage designed by Verge and is the only example surviving in Sydney.
