= Rose Bay Sea Wall =

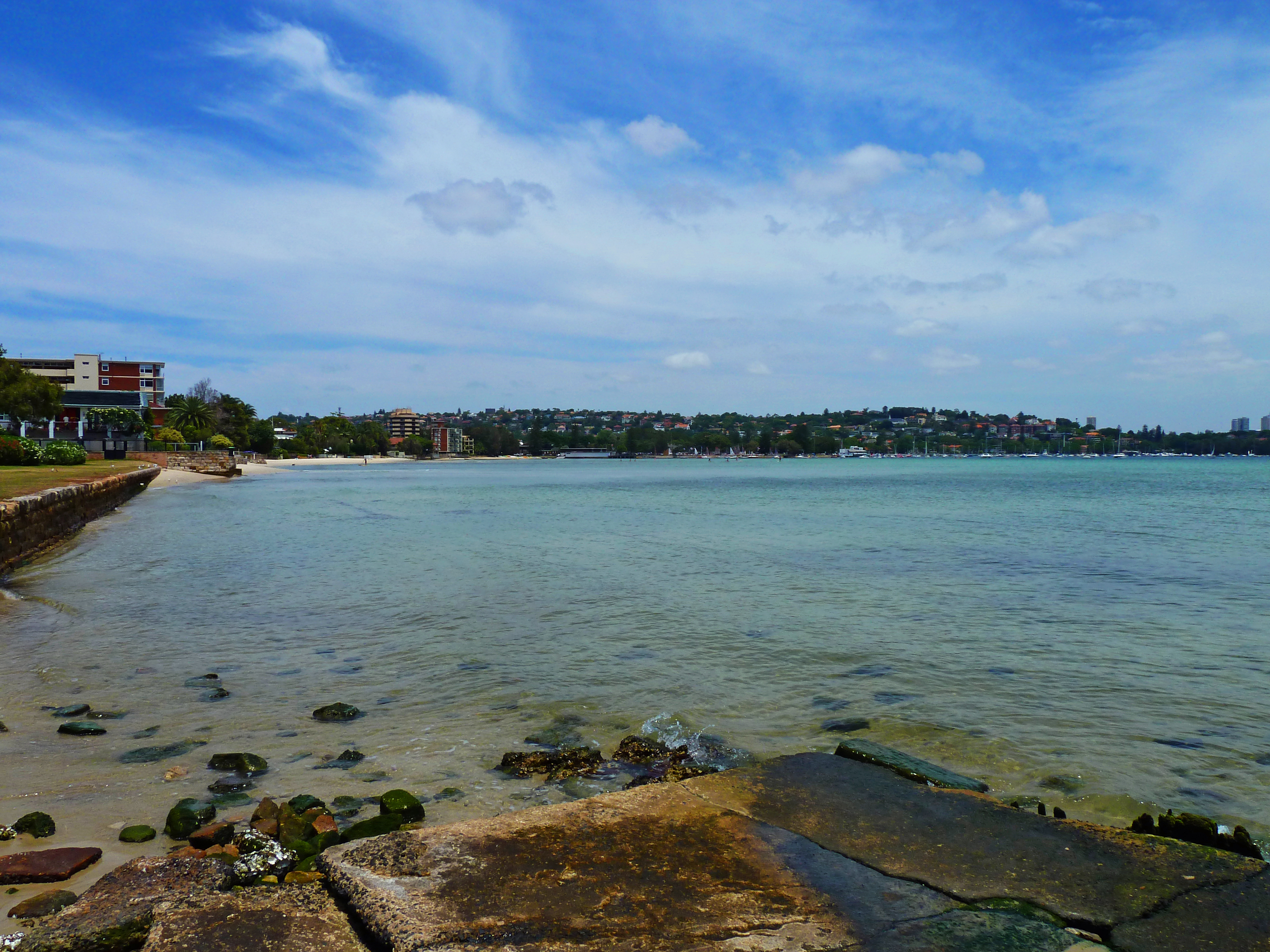
- The sea wall, pictured at extreme left, in January 2011

- Location within Sydney Location within Australia
- 33°52′19″S 151°15′26″E
- Location: New South Head Road, Rose Bay, Municipality of Woollahra, New South Wales, Australia

History
- Built: 1924–1926

Site notes
- Architect: Herbert E. Ross

New South Wales Heritage Register
- Official name: Rose Bay Sea Wall, Promenade and its setting
- Type: State heritage (complex / group)
- Designated: 22 August 2014
- Reference no.: 1932
- Type: Sea-wall
- Category: Transport - Water
- Builders: Woollahra Municipal Council

Rose Bay Sea Wall is a heritage-listed former Aboriginal land, farms and road reserve and now sea wall, road reserve and esplanade at New South Head Road, Rose Bay, New South Wales, Australia. It was designed by Herbert E. Ross and built from 1924 to 1926 by Woollahra Municipal Council. It is also known as Rose Bay Sea Wall, Promenade and its setting. It was added to the New South Wales State Heritage Register on 22 August 2014.

== History ==
The traditional owners of the land from South Head to Petersham were the Cadigal people. Following European occupation of Woollahra the Cadigal band disappeared from the area by about the middle of the 19th century.

=== Rose Bay ===
Rose Bay was called Ginagulla (Prof. FD McCarthy) -open sea - in fact in geological times there was indeed an opening to the sea from there, evident still near Bondi.

==== New South Head Road ====
New South Head Road was completed to the signal station at Vaucluse by 1839, including the section along Rose Bay. In May 1848 the South Head Roads Trust Act was passed which placed control of roads (including New South Head Road) and the construction of tollgates with the South Heads Trust. In 1904 the NSW Government passed management of major roads to local councils. A number of councils objected to the added financial burden so in November 1904 the Minister for Works undertook to repair and maintain the former Trust roads until such time as the councils could raise more revenue.

Meanwhile, the volume of traffic along New South Head Road was steadily increasing. By the 1890s a tramway terminus was situated at the western end of Rose Bay. The tram service was extended as far as Dover Road in 1900, and then to Watsons Bay wharf by 1909. Woollahra Council was acquiring land for widening New South Head Road by the beginning of 1917 and a deputation met with the Local Government Department later in the year to urge resumptions, realignment of sections of the road and generally widening it. The council established a New South Head Road Improvement Committee to look after the proposed works, which commenced at the beginning of 1918. New South Head Road was proclaimed a main road under the Local Government Act 1919. The road widening works were carried out over several stages. In June 1924 the prominent architect Herbert E. Ross offered his services as an honorary consulting engineer for the works between Rose Bay and Lyne Park, acting in conjunction with Council's own engineer. Council accepted his offer.

==== Herbert Ross ====
Herbert Ross was born in the vicinity of Inverell in 1868. After studying Science at University of Edinburgh he returned to Sydney and enrolled at the University of Sydney to study topics associated with mining and civil engineering. Ross became the manager of gold mines in New South Wales and Queensland, and then practiced as a metallurgist.He also studied architecture under John Sulman at the University of Sydney and by 1900 had set up a practice as an architect and engineer.

In 1911 Ross went into partnership with the architect Ruskin Rowe and in the years that followed the practice of H. E. Ross and Rowe became one of the largest in Sydney. Perhaps its best-known building was the large and impressive headquarters for the former Government Savings Bank of NSW at 44 Martin Place (now occupied by the Commonwealth Bank). H. E. Ross and Rowe also designed about 150 branch buildings for the bank, several large city office buildings, the former Usher's Hotel in Castlereagh Street, the building for the Royal Automobile Club in Macquarie Street, suburban hotels, blocks of flats, warehouses, churches and houses. Along with so many architectural practices, the firm of H. E. Ross and Rowe suffered as a result of the Great Depression, but only broke up after Ross died in 1937.

==== The Rose Bay Sea wall and Promenade ====
The Rose Bay Promenade was designed as an integrated scheme that allowed both pedestrians and motorists a unique opportunity to view the waters of Rose Bay and the harbour beyond. The Rose Bay Promenade was designed to optimise this view. The concrete balustrade were low to allow motorists a view over it as they travelled along New South Head Road or from the parking bays that form part of the scheme. The interface between the harbour and foreshore zone and the experience of this was fundamental to the original design.

The Chief Secretary, the Hon C. W. Oakes, laid the foundation stone for the sea wall on 25 October 1924, witnessed by a crowd of dignitaries and prominent citizens. During the ceremony Oakes praised the efforts of the Council and described it as "progressive and efficient".

At the beginning of 1925 architects Pitt and Morrow submitted drawings to Council describing the facade of a shop and refreshment rooms adjacent to the Rose Bay jetty for Council's consideration. The front (south) wall of the building formed part of the seawall. The building had in fact been originally constructed in 1909.

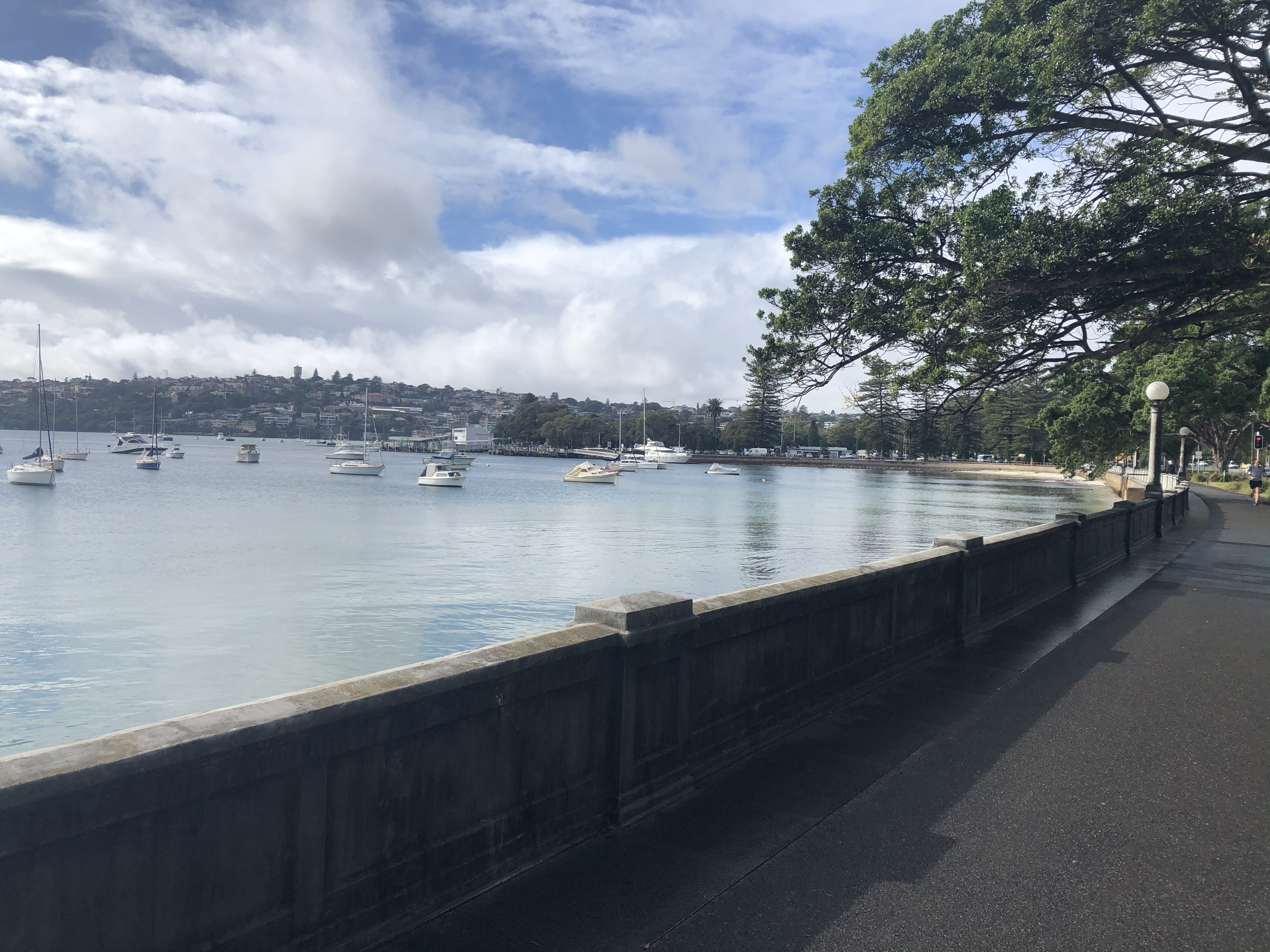
The Rose Bay Seawall, built from 1924-1926, pictured in sunlight in May, 2020

On 19 February 1926 the very much wider New South Head Road, which also incorporated central tram lines, was officially declared open and the lights along the promenade switched on. A large crowd watched the mayor of Woollahra, Alderman L. W. Robinson, perform the opening ceremony. The Mayor suggested that this section of New South Head Road "was the best piece of road in Australia today: it rivalled the celebrated St Kilda Road of which they had heard so much".

The project was not quite complete, as work on "plantations" was still in progress at the time - the landscaping works were to extend along both sides of New South Head Road. When the lights came on "the effect was beautiful. The promenade was immediately filled with a gay throng, enjoying the cool sea breeze. Many of the homes opposite were also illuminated, and the effect was brilliant. There is no other promenade in New South Wales which can compare with this at Rose Bay for beauty, as well as expanse".

The works, which significantly contained purpose-designed parking bays both for the convenience of motorists and an adjunct to the amenity of tourists, were placed under the management and control of Woollahra Council on 17 March 1926, but by 1929 New South Head Road was placed under the control of the Main Roads Board. The tram service from the City of Sydney to Watsons Bay ceased operating on 10 July 1960 and was replaced by buses.

In the last decade there have been numerous Land and Environment Court appeals relating to a proposed expansion of the Rose Bay Marina. Both cases involved a huge community opposition to any future development that would impinge on the existing body of water of Rose Bay and subsequently views from the Rose Bay Promenade.

=== Context ===
In the 1920s many local councils undertook "beautification" schemes, assisted by the Local Government Act of 1919 that gave councils the power to resume land. Examples of these resumptions and accompanying beautification works include the construction of bathing facilities and concourses at Bondi Beach (1930), beautification of the surrounds of the Spit Bridge (1924) and the promenade at Balmoral, which included a bathing pavilion (1929), a band rotunda and a promenade (both 1930). Vaucluse Council undertook works at Parsley Bay that included the erection of an imposing pavilion-like kiosk in 1929 and a seawall during the mid-1930s. Other groups undertook improvements and beautification schemes as well, such as the Nielsen Park Trust, which constructed a promenade and terraced platforms alongside part of the harbour foreshores at the edge of the park.

The widening of New South Head Road was not the first reclamation to have taken place on the harbour foreshores at Rose Bay. In 1902 tidal sand flats were reclaimed to form Lyne Park, named in honour of a former premier of New South Wales, Sir William Lyne. The widening of New South Head Road was one of a large number of road improvement and beautification schemes carried out in Woollahra during the 1920s. According to the Sydney Morning Herald, "during the past 18 months the Woollahra Council has initiated a policy of street beautification, and has expended about 2000 pounds in street plantations and rock gardens. In the large rockery at the corner of New South Head-road and Gallipoli Avenue (now Rose Bay Avenue) there are no fewer than 7000 plants". In fact, Council had undertaken a program of tree planting as early as 1918.

After a long community-led campaign with support from The Hon.Gabrielle Upton, Member for Vaucluse, and Woollahra Municipal Council, the Rose Bay Sea Wall, promenade and their setting were listed on the NSW State Heritage Register in April 2014. Woollahra Council on the advice of a staff report about the appropriate extent of view from the Promenade (to include in its listing curtilage), unanimously adopted the view that the view should include all of Rose Bay out to a line between Steele Point on the east and Woollahra Point on the west. The Woollahra History & Heritage Society wrote to the Heritage Council seeking that this wider view as proposed by Council be included in the listing curtilage, citing the view's social value and impacts on it of several recent development proposals. The Heritage Council recommended to the Minister for Heritage that the northern curtilage extend 30 metres (98 ft) out from the seawall.

In 2014 a heritage plaque was installed in the footpath outside the gate of Rose Bay Lodge, recording that Sir Daniel Cooper, merchant had lived here. Further information on Cooper and Sir John Hay who also lived here (leasing it from the Cooper estate) is on Woollahra Municipal Council's website.

== Description ==
The Rose Bay Promenade is a collective term for various elements including: the seawall, the balustrade with light standards directly above; four sets of stairs to access Rose Bay; the road carriageway, footpaths to the north and south of New South Head Road; landscaped verge of mature fig trees and other plantings punctuated by parking bays either side of New South Head Road; and the early refreshment rooms. The setting comprises Rose Bay Park to the west and the waters of Rose Bay.

The seawall consists of a structure covered by cement render, above which is a reinforced concrete balustrade wall of 30 panelled bays topped by 29 regularly-spaced light standards of precast concrete columns with single spherical glass lights. A thin coat of surface render has been applied in the 2007 reconstruction. The balustrade and lamp standards are designed in the Inter-War Free Classical style; the Tuscan order has been used in the design of the light standards. Pairs of lamp standards flank openings for three sets of concrete stairs which provide access to the water of the bay, or at low tide, the narrow beach below the seawall, from the northern footpath. Openings for two of them are aligned with streets intersecting with New South Head Road (O'Sullivan and Beresford Roads). Another flight of stairs links the northern footpath to the jetty and Rose Bay Park.

The original surface to the footpath is not known. Around 1981 there was a wash concrete finish with borders of brick pavers, apparently laid over earlier paving. The surface was relaid in 2007 to incorporate granite paving borders and a cross-strip at each lamp standard, and a new layer of bitumen.

Two commemorative plaques are situated on the structure; the 1924 foundation stone on the southern side of the balustrade wall and a plaque on the northern face of the wall commemorating Frank Pace, described as the "Lord Mayor" of Rose Bay.

A mature row of Hill's Weeping Figs, or Ficus Hillii, creates an avenue either side of the carriageway of New South Head Road. This tree type remains the dominant species in the row, despite new plantings and replacement of some trees. Hill's Weeping Figs are characteristic of 1920s plantings. The girth of their trunks suggests that they are probably an original part of the scheme. Early photographs show the new plantings upon completion of the construction, and later photographs track the growth of the trees over time.

The building at the western end of the Rose Bay Promenade was constructed as refreshment rooms. It has been modified and extended over time and has been occupied by Pier restaurant for a number of years. Its original configuration is still apparent " a masonry building, the external walls of which are cement rendered, with a terracotta tiled roof consisting of a high gabled section flanked on either side by hipped sections. Its faade contains original fabric" a large gable with a cast cement cartouche, openings that retain leadlight glazing and bracketed eaves. The southern portion of this building has been identified as of high significance; however, the refreshment pier is not part of this heritage assessment.

=== Condition ===
As at 28 January 2014, the Rose Bay Promenade is currently in excellent condition.

=== Modifications and dates ===
Works to the Rose Bay Promenade since completion were generally limited to maintenance and repairs until 2007, when a major upgrade occurred.

An engineering study in 2003 into the condition of the concrete seawall, balustrade, stairs and light standards found evidence of cracking and salt attack in the seawall and varying degrees of spalling and corrosion in the other elements. The study proposed various remedial measures.

The major restoration and upgrade works carried out in 2007 included repairs to the balustrade, light standards and stairs. The seawall was generally retained in its existing condition with only minor repairs. However, significant repairs were required to the concrete balustrade, with sections affected by concrete cancer removed and repaired with epoxy cement, and degraded reinforcing replaced with stainless steel. A new layer of thin render was applied to the surface of the balustrade to bond the repaired and original sections.

All the original lamp standards were replaced with exact replicas made by casting new columns from an original mould. New glass spheres were installed, which were appropriate to the size of the columns (previously, there had been much larger spheres and also sets of double spheres hung off either side of a T-shaped bracket).

The footpath was reconstructed to its original 4 metre width, with a new granite paving pattern with a border to the sea side of the footpath, and strips crossing the footpath at every light standard. The fig trees were preserved, with native groundcover plantings of grasses and shrubs planted beneath. Replacement trees were planted where older trees needed to be removed. Porous asphalt surfaces to protect tree roots and provide drainage around trees was installed, along with new timber and steel street furniture and steel bollards in front of the refreshment pier.

The stairs were rebuilt on top of the existing stairs. New handrails of timber with steel wire balustrading were installed.

A new secondary lighting system was considered necessary due to the insufficient spacing of the existing lights, and the fact that the existing street lighting is blocked by the fig trees. Low grey metal pier lighting with a square cross-section has been added to the south side of the footpath, set low to light the footpath and not disrupt views of the harbour.

A sustainable stormwater treatment and recycling system has been built into the upgrade works. Run-off water is collected in large tanks under the parking bays, treated by filtering systems, and then available for reuse for localised irrigation and maintenance.

Future proposals included a viewing deck, which was approved but not constructed, and a two-way bicycle path.

The works were carried out by Woollahra Council, with the design works by Conybeare Morrison, and the contractor Eco Civil. The upgrading works won the Woollahra Heritage Conservation Award in 2008.

=== Further information ===
The form of the Rose Bay Promenade is generally in the same form as the original construction. Many repairs and alterations were carried out to the northern edge in 2007 resulting in some changes to the fabric, finishes and details of the balustrade, lighting, northern footpath and substructure. The overall significance of the item has been preserved and enhanced through the repairs and reconstructions of 2007. There has been no loss of original detail or elements in terms of form or style.

== Heritage listing ==
The Rose Bay Sea Wall, Promenade and its setting may be of state heritage significance for its historic values as a good and representative example of one of the earliest and largest 20th Century civic improvement schemes for the recreation of both pedestrians and motorists. It clearly demonstrates the increasing uptake of private motor transport in the early 1920s.

Its potential State heritage significance is enhanced through its association with noted engineer and architect Herbert Ross whose architectural partnership with Ruskin Rowe was one of the largest architectural offices in Sydney producing well regarded building designs such as the former Government Savings Bank, the Royal Automobile Club and the former Ushers Hotel.

The Rose Bay Sea Wall, Promenade and its setting has potential state heritage significance for its aesthetic values including high quality architectural elements in the Inter War Free Classical style. It is an early and at the time unique integrated civic improvement design with low lying balustrades, parking bays, lighting and landscape elements (including the avenue of weeping figs) designed in such a way as to allow the pleasure of viewing Rose Bay by both pedestrian and motoring visitors. The scheme defined the sweeping interface between the waters of Rose Bay and the foreshore zone which is reflected in the inclusion of 20 meters of the bay waters, following the contours of the bay, as an indicative setting in the State Heritage listing curtilage. The experience of this interface to both pedestrians and motorists was integral to the original scheme.

The Sea Wall Promenade and its setting are a relatively intact and good representative example of a 1920s civic improvement scheme designed in the Inter War Free Classical style and using trees representative of street and park plantings of the 1920s.Note: The State Heritage Inventory provides information about heritage items listed by local and State government agencies. The State Heritage Inventory is continually being updated by local and State agencies as new information becomes available. Read the OEH copyright and disclaimer.

Rose Bay Sea Wall was listed on the New South Wales State Heritage Register on 22 August 2014 having satisfied the following criteria.

The place is important in demonstrating the course, or pattern, of cultural or natural history in New South Wales.

The Rose Bay sea wall, promenade and its setting is of potential state heritage significance as it is one of the earliest and largest civic improvement scheme for pedestrians and motorists it clearly demonstrates the increasing uptake of private motor transport in the early 1920s. Its significant historic use for the pursuit of leisure and harbourside activities continues to the present day

The place has a strong or special association with a person, or group of persons, of importance of cultural or natural history of New South Wales's history.

The items potential state heritage significance is enhanced through its association with noted engineer and architect Herbert Ross whose architectural partnership with Ruskin Rowe was one of the largest architectural offices in Sydney producing well regarded building designs such as the former Government Savings Bank, the Royal Automobile Club and the former Ushers Hotel.

The place is important in demonstrating aesthetic characteristics and/or a high degree of creative or technical achievement in New South Wales.

The sea wall, promenade and it settings has potential state heritage significance for its aesthetic values as an early and at the time unique integrated civic improvement design with low lying balustrades, parking bays and other features in the Inter War Free Classical style designed in such a way as to allow the pleasure of viewing the expanse of Rose Bay by both pedestrian and motoring visitors.

The place is important in demonstrating the principal characteristics of a class of cultural or natural places/environments in New South Wales.

The item has potential state heritage values as an intact and good representative example of a 1920s civic improvement scheme designed in the Inter War Free Classical style and using trees representative of street and park plantings of the 1920s.
