= Rose Bay, New South Wales =

Rose Bay
- Suburb
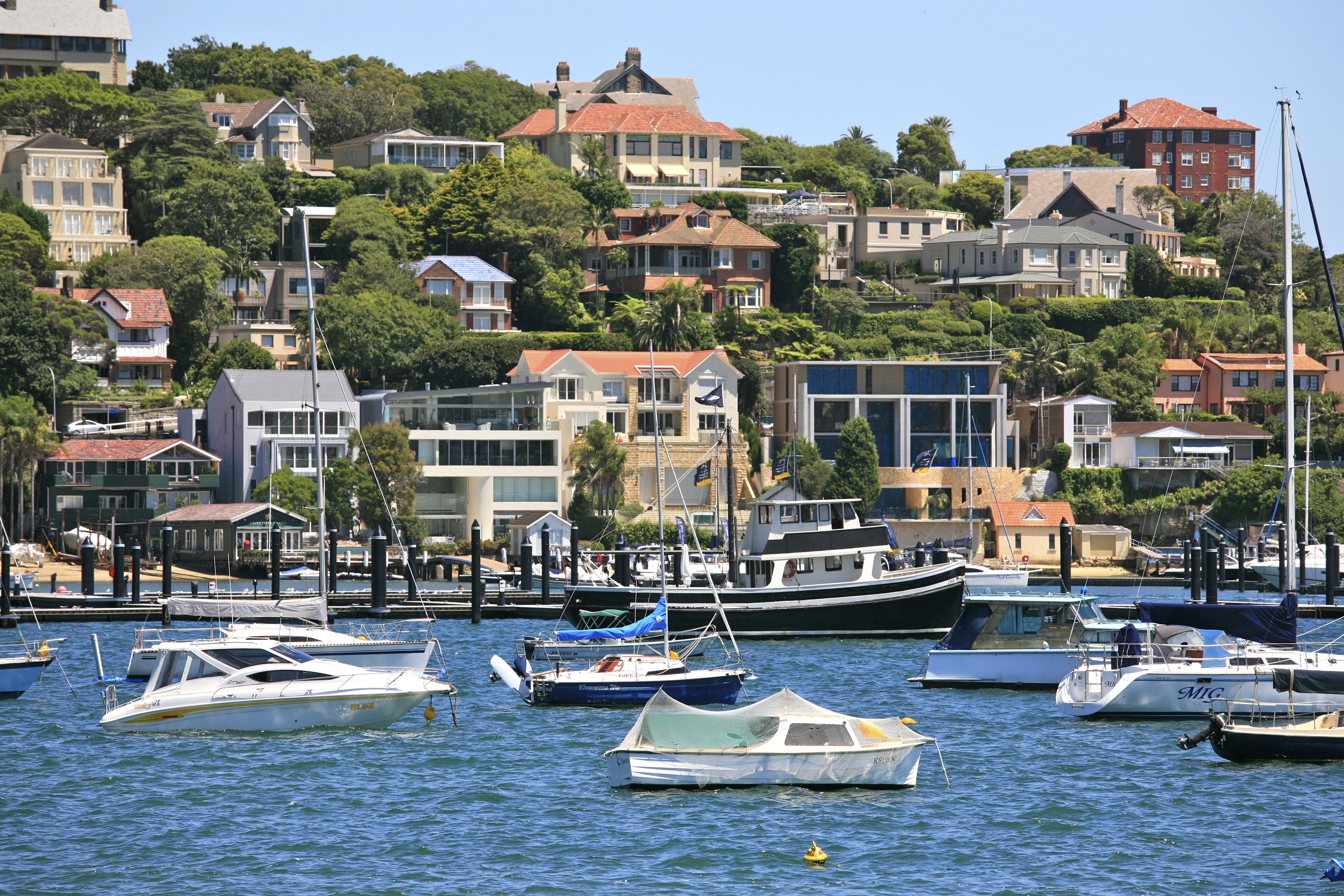
- Rose Bay, New South Wales

- Interactive map of Rose Bay
- Country: Australia
- State: New South Wales
- City: Sydney
- LGAs: Waverley Council; Municipality of Woollahra
- Location: 7.00 km (4.35 mi) east of Sydney CBD

Government
  - State electorate: Vaucluse
  - Federal division: Wentworth

Area
  - Total: 2.6 km^{2} (1.0 sq mi)
- Elevation: 11 m (36 ft)

Population
  - Total: 9,911 (SAL 2021)
- Postcode: 2029
Suburbs around Rose Bay
Point Piper	Port Jackson	Vaucluse
Bellevue Hill	Rose Bay	Dover Heights
Bellevue Hill	Bondi Beach	North Bondi

Rose Bay is a harbourside eastern suburb of Sydney, in the state of New South Wales, Australia. Rose Bay is located seven kilometres east of the Sydney central business district, in the local government areas of Municipality of Woollahra (on its western side towards the bay) and Waverley Council (east of Old South Head Road).

== Geography ==
Rose Bay has views of both the Sydney Opera House and the Sydney Harbour Bridge together. Lyne Park abuts Sydney Harbour on its west. Shark Island is located in Sydney Harbour, just north of Rose Bay.

== History ==
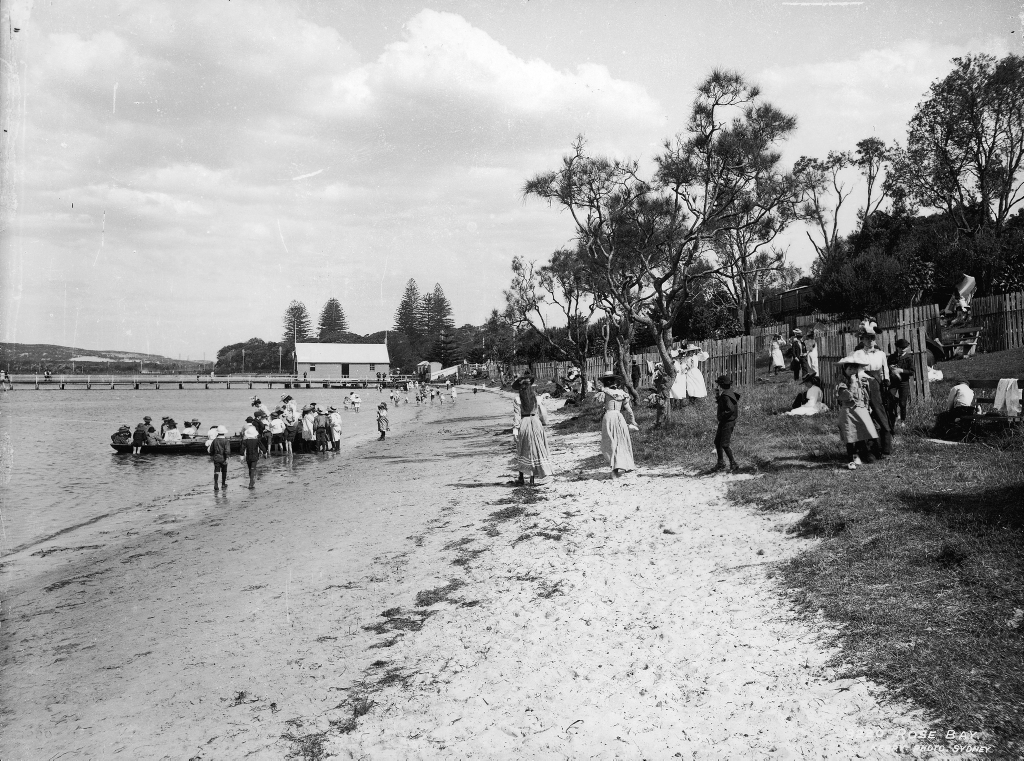
Rose bay, circa 1900

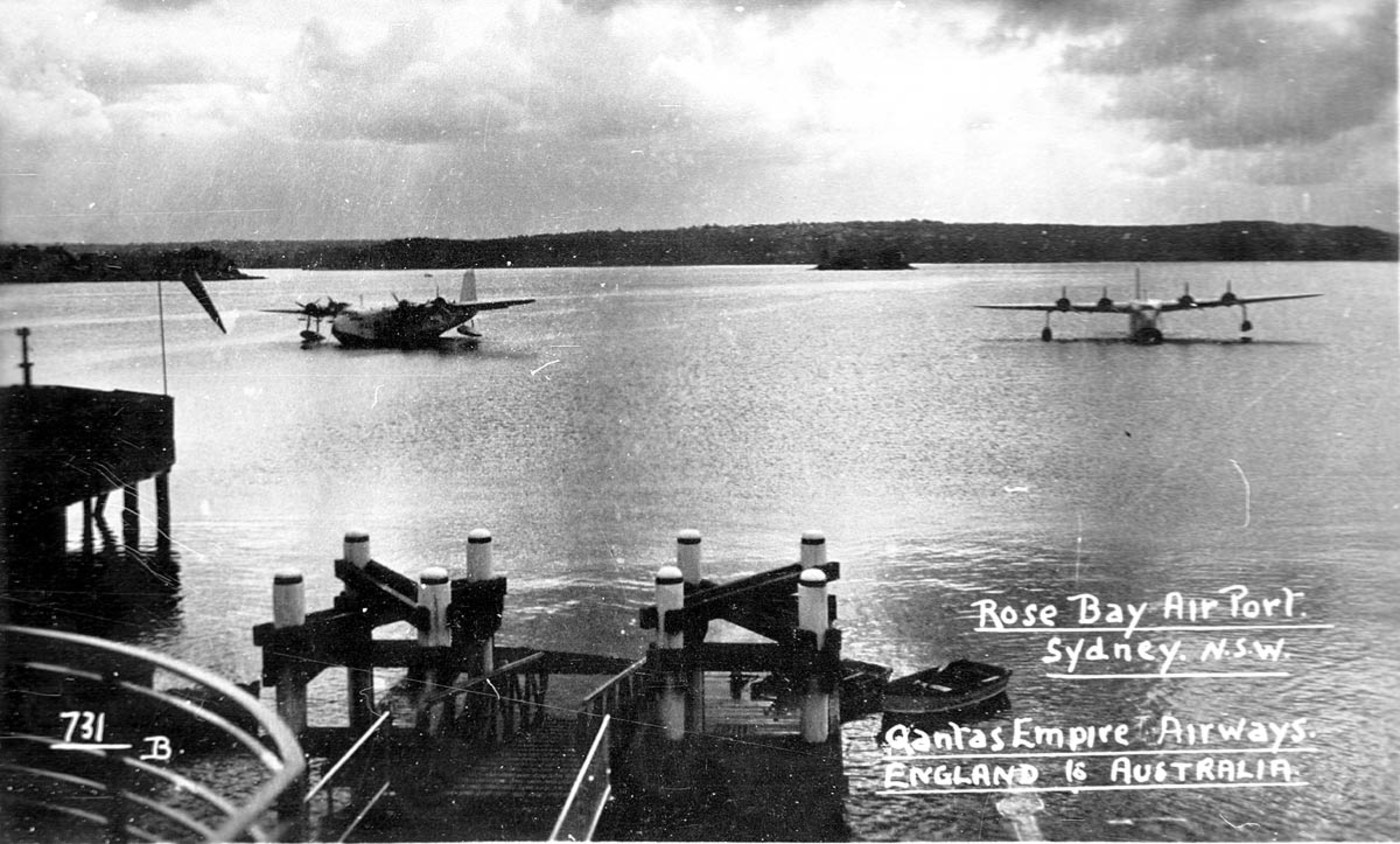
Qantas Empire Airways seaplane flights arriving at Rose Bay (c.1939)

The original name of the land now known as Rose Bay is Banarung, Dharag Language. Rose Bay was named after the Right Honourable George Rose, who was joint Secretary to the British Treasury with Thomas Steele, after whom Steel(e) Point at Nielsen Park was named. The name Rose Bay was used as early as 1788 by Captain John Hunter. HMAS Tingira, named after an Aboriginal word for 'open sea' was moored in Rose Bay from 1912 to 1927. It was used to train over 3,000 Australian sailors, many for service in World War I. There is a small park on the Rose Bay waterfront which commemorates Tingira.

From 1938, seaplane flights to and from London began and terminated in Sydney Harbour on Rose Bay, making it Sydney's first international airport, and what is now Rose Bay Water Airport. On 14 September 1945, nine Catalina flying boats landed and moored at the Rose Bay wharf, repatriating Australian prisoners of war who were survivors of Japanese camps. Sydneysiders looked on in silence, aghast at the emaciated state of the returning soldiers.

The Wintergarden Cinema was a landmark building which housed the Sydney Film Festival from 1968 to 1973, but which was demolished to make way for exclusive apartments in the late 1980s.

== Heritage listings ==
Rose Bay has a number of heritage-listed sites, including:

- 3–4 Fernleigh Gardens: Site of Ficus superba var. henneana tree
- New South Head Road: Rose Bay Sea Wall
- 1–7 Salisbury Road: Salisbury Court (Rose Bay)

=== Rose Bay Cottage ===
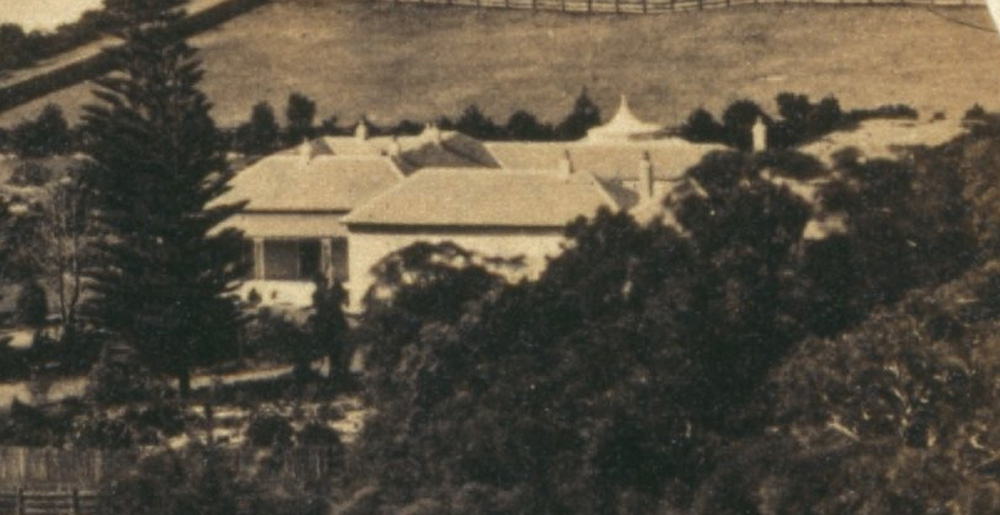
Rose Bay Cottage (then called Rose Bay Lodge) c. 1855 when it was owned by Sir Daniel Cooper.

Rose Bay Cottage and also known as Salisbury Court, located in Salisbury Road, was built in 1834 by the important colonial architect, John Verge, for James Holt who, at the time, managed the 'Cooper Estate'. When built, it was the only house on the 'Estate', with the possible exception of Henrietta Villa, Captain Piper's previous home on Point Piper. The house was built as a single-storey residence of about 225 square metres (2,420 sq ft) with a verandah, over a similar sized stone cellar. Adjacent to it was an earlier structure (c. 1820s) which was apparently adopted as a kitchen. The house was significantly enlarged by sympathetic additions between 1837 and 1850 and the kitchen wing was joined to the main house forming a courtyard. By the end of this period the house had more than doubled in size. From 1861 until 1911, the house was usually known as Rose Bay Lodge; it has also been known as Salisbury Court. It was surrounded by extensive gardens embellished by five working fountains fed from a water source above on the slopes of Bellevue Hill which later fed Woollahra House, built in 1883 on Point Piper. One of the fountains still remains. Prominent occupiers of the house included Sir Daniel Cooper, Walter Lamb and John Hay – they were all noted businessmen and parliamentarians. In 1911, the property, then of 1.6 hectares (4 acres), was sub-divided and surrounded by other houses. During the next fifty years the old house suffered extensive unsympathetic additions including a second storey over the original Verge cottage which converted the house to twelve flats. It has subsequently been restored according to strict conservation standards and the unsympathetic additions removed. The house is listed on the New South Wales State Heritage Register.

=== Fernleigh Castle ===
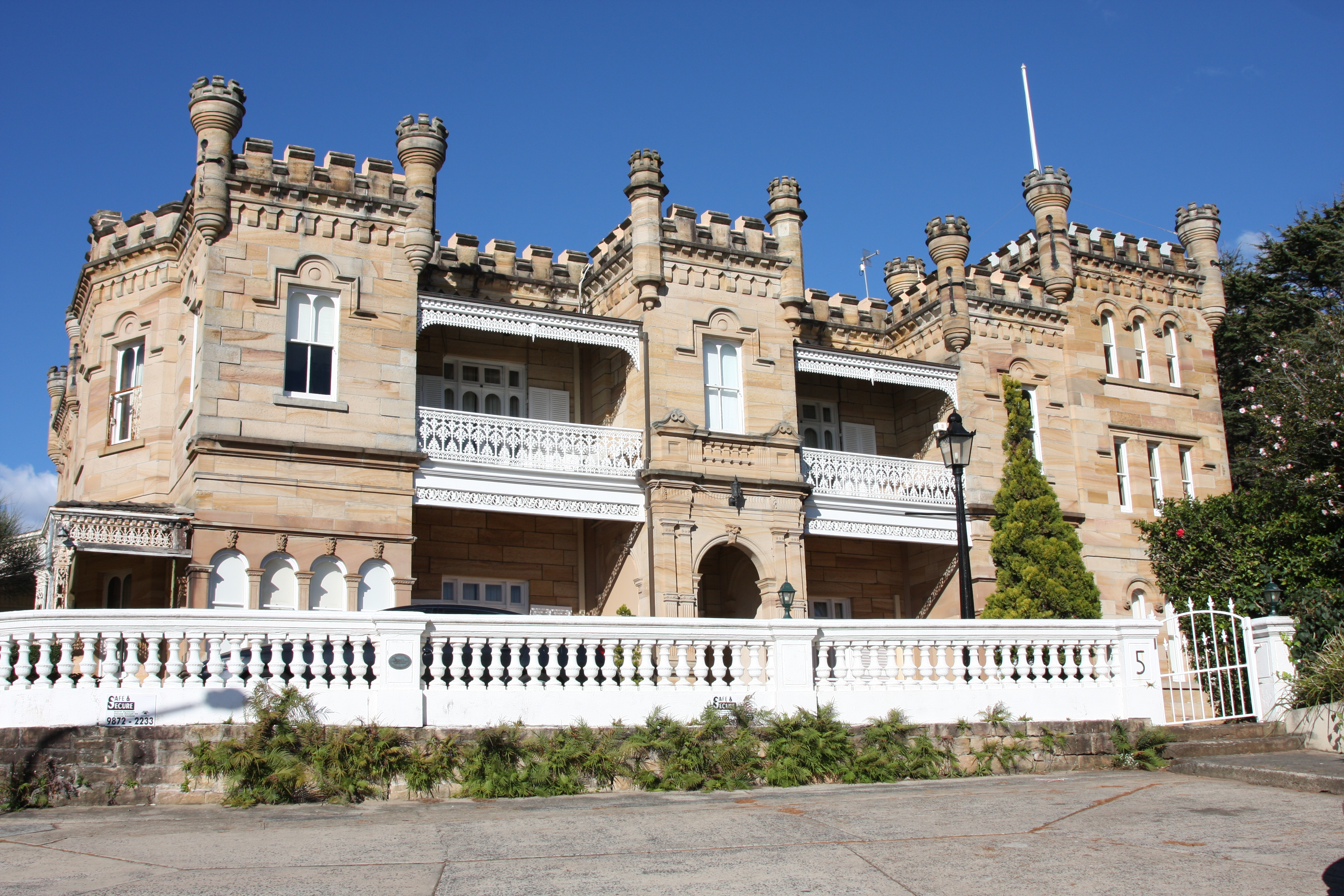
Fernleigh Castle

Fernleigh Castle was built in 1892, incorporating part of a sandstone cottage that dated back to 1874. Aptly named, it resembles a castle with its turrets, castellated towers and square Norman tower. Its sandstone structure contains thirty rooms and a number of stained-glass windows. Fernleigh Castle is on the (now defunct) Register of the National Estate.

A fig tree, Ficus superba var. henneana, planted in c. 1827, located in the former castle grounds is listed on the New South Wales State Heritage Register.

=== Rose Bay Police Station ===
This police station originally started life as the gatekeeper's lodge in the estate of Woollahra House, a nineteenth-century mansion that has long gone. The surviving building was designed in a Victorian Classical Revival style which is attributed to 'Hilly and Mansfield' and which probably tells us what Woollahra House looked like. It was built in 1871 and features rendered walls punctuated with pilasters. Sympathetically restored, it is now on the (now defunct) Register of the National Estate.

== Educational facilities and history ==
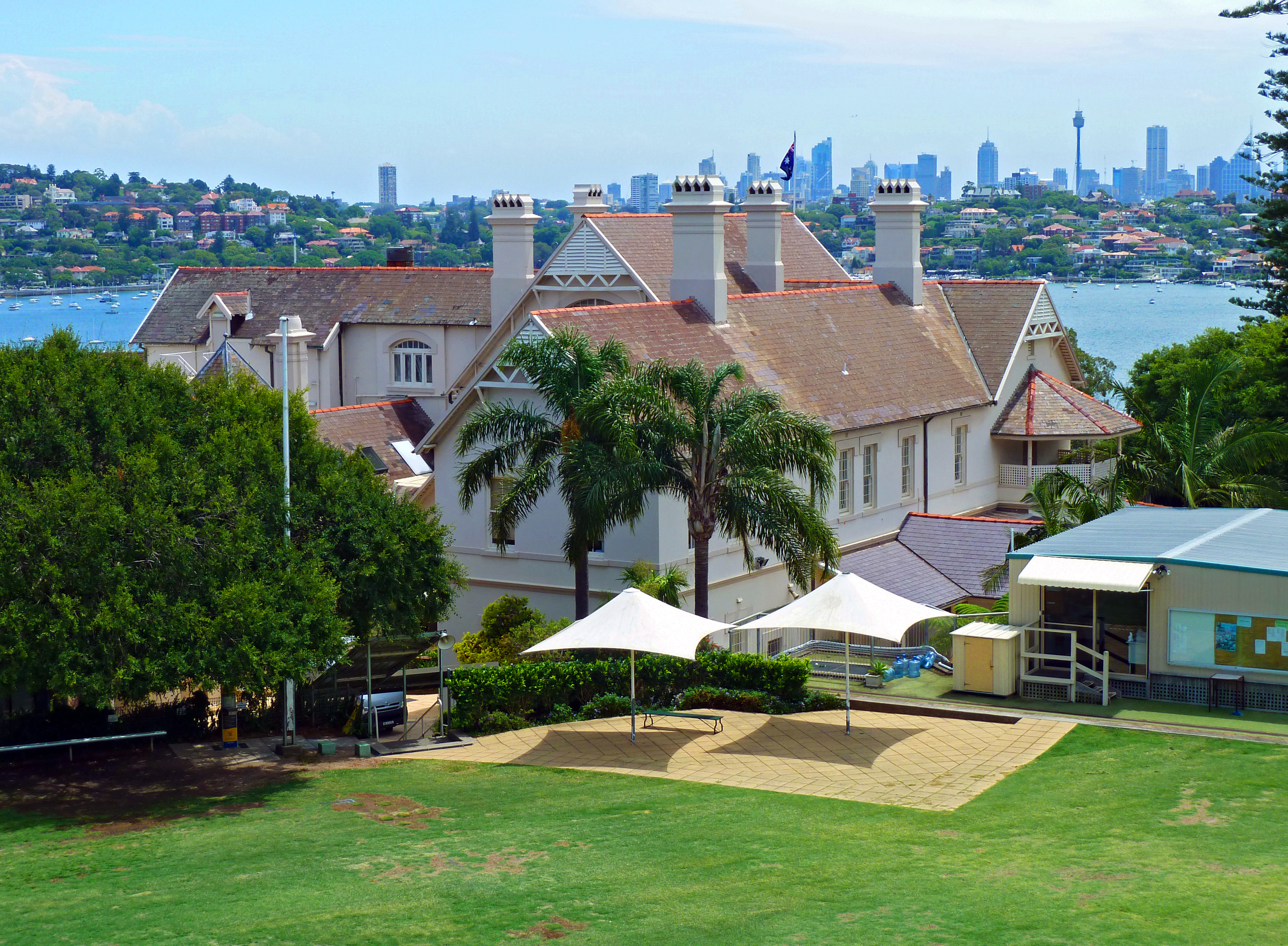
Kambala School

Rose Bay is home to two independent schools: Kambala (1887), an Anglican, day and boarding school for girls from Pre-school to Year 12; and Kincoppal – Rose Bay (1882), a Catholic, day and boarding school with a co-educational primary school and girls-only high school. Kincoppal – Rose Bay was originally Rose Bay Convent but amalgamated with Kincoppal Elizabeth Bay in the late 1970s to become "Kincoppal – Rose Bay School of the Sacred Heart". The prep school campus of Cranbrook School (1918) is also located in the suburb. McAuley Primary School is a Catholic school for Kindergarten to Year 6. It was opened in 1967 on the site that had been a Christian Brothers High School from 1935 to 1966.

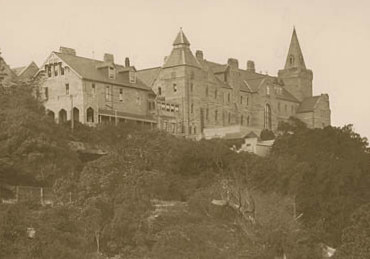
Convent of the Sacred Heart (Kincoppal), c.1930s

Public schools in the suburb are Rose Bay Secondary College (2004) and Rose Bay Public School (1891). Rose Bay Secondary College was formed by the amalgamation of Vaucluse High School and Dover Heights High School. Originally these schools were known as Vaucluse Boys High, Dover Heights Boys High and Dover Heights Girls High. The cost of improving the public school facilities at Rose Bay was linked to the sale of the campus at Vaucluse. Despite a surge in enrolments and an unmet demand for public high school places in the area, the Vaucluse campus was sold in February 2007 by the Government of New South Wales for $30M to become a seniors community development site.

The Convent of the Sacred Heart overlooks the bay and can be seen from many vantage points around Sydney Harbour. The site was originally occupied by a house called Claremont, which was built in 1852. The convent incorporated this house when it was built in 1888. Designed by John Horbury Hunt, the new building was of five storeys in height and made of sandstone that was quarried at the site. It included a Gothic Revival Chapel and is regarded as one of Hunt's most successful creations. It now houses the Kincoppal-Rose Bay school for girls. The building has a Federal heritage listing.

== Transport ==
Rose Bay ferry wharf is served by Watsons Bay ferry services. There are frequent Transdev John Holland buses to and from the centre of Sydney via Kings Cross as well as other points and out to Watsons Bay and the coast. Seaplane operators offer scenic flights over Sydney itself as well as a number of excursions along the coast as well as some scheduled services to Newcastle with aircraft operating out of the seaplane terminal near Rose Bay ferry terminal.

== Sport and recreation ==
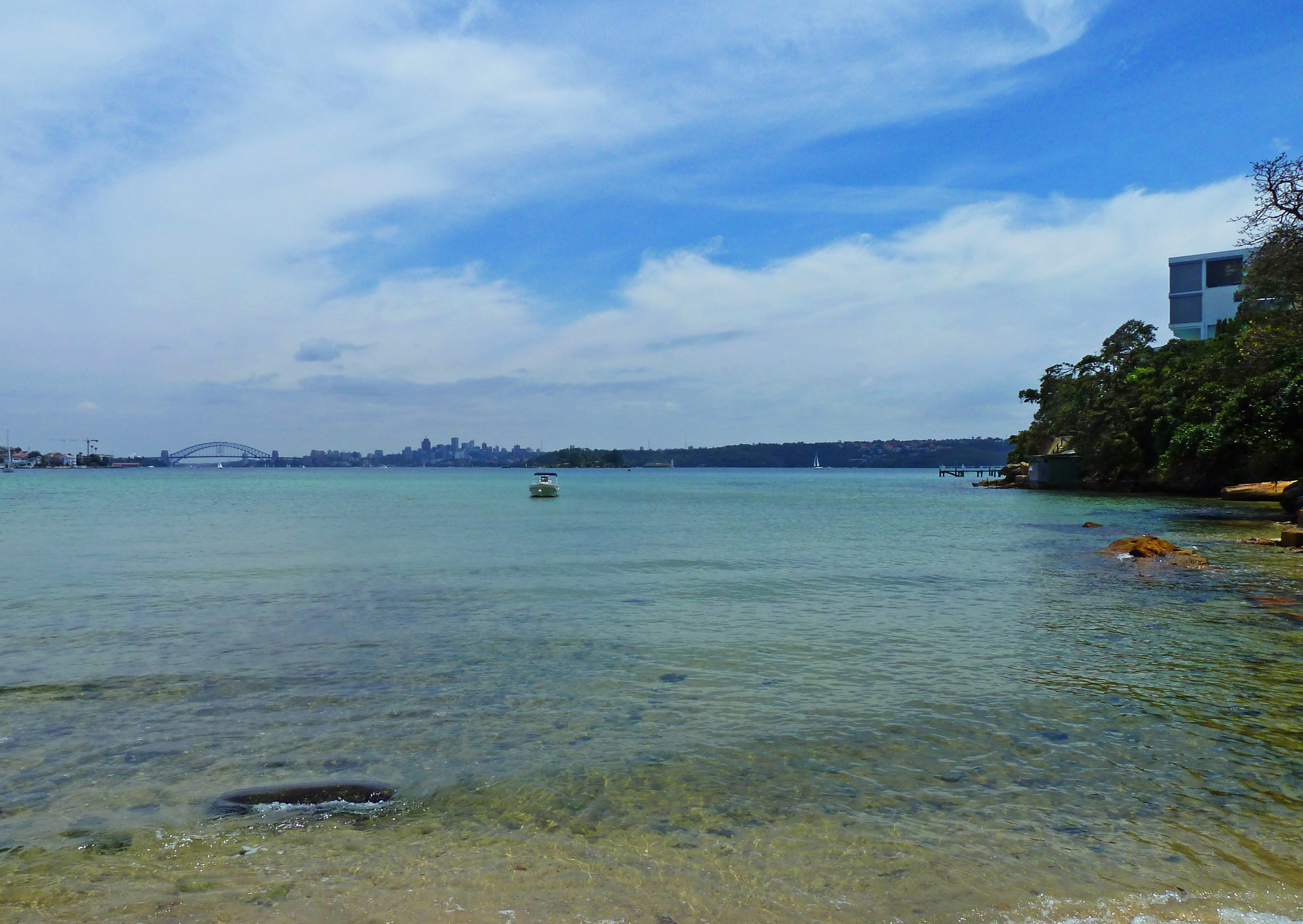
Sydney Harbour, from Rose Bay

In 1902 a reserve named in honour of Sir William Lyne was reclaimed from tidal sand flats at Rose Bay. In 1904 harbour baths were built in a design by the architect Thomas Tidswell. The baths have since been removed.

Since 1908, Rose Bay has been represented in one of Australia's most popular sporting competitions, the National Rugby League, by the Sydney Roosters, officially known as the Eastern Suburbs District Rugby League Football Club.

There are two golf courses located in Rose Bay. Woollahra Golf Club is a public 9-hole course and Royal Sydney Golf Club is a private 27-hole championship course, not open to the public.

The 3rd Rose Bay Rovers group is an active Rovers group based in the Scouts Hall located in Vickery Avenue, opposite Woollahra Sailing Club.

Rose Bay is home to the Waverley Amateur Radio Society, Australia's longest continuously licensed amateur radio club. The club meets on a regular basis at the Scouts Hall located in Vickery Avenue.

Rose Bay beach (also known locally as Dog Beach) is at the far eastern end of the bay and as the name suggests is a popular beach for dog owners. Despite its popularity, Rose Bay beach is not always safe to swim at due to the pollution issues surrounding the beach.

== Population ==
=== Demographics ===
At the 2021 census, there were 9,911 people living in Rose Bay. 54.8% of people in Rose Bay are Australian-born, compared to 66.9% for Australia. Of the immigrants, most are from South Africa (9.3%), then England (5.6%), New Zealand (2.1%), China (2.1%) and Israel (1.7%). Of Rose Bay's population, 29.0% stated they were Jewish, 28.3% said they had no religion, 17.2% said they were Catholic, 7.7% did not state a religion and 7.7% said they were Anglican. The median weekly household income was $2,539, compared to the Australian median of $1,746.

According to the 2016 census, the population of Rose Bay (including Vaucluse) was 10,053.

Data released by Sensis showed that in 2015 the Hebrew surname Cohen (i.e. Priest) was Rose Bay's top-ranked surname, followed second by the Anglo surname Smith, and third the European (mostly Ashkenazi Jewish) surname Kaplan (i.e. Priest). The first and third top-ranking surnames reflecting the Jewish population plurality of the suburb. Its significant Jewish population has seen the suburb referred to by the derogatory name of "Nose Bay".

=== Housing ===
According to the 2021 census, there are 2,758 flats in Rose Bay, or 68.8% of all dwellings, compared to an Australian average of 14.2%. There are also 826 separate houses (20.6%) and 349 semi/terraces (8.7%). Of these, 42.4% are rented, 30.0% are fully owned and 23.8% are being purchased.

== In popular culture ==
Elizabeth Harrower's debut novel, Down in the City, begins in Rose Bay. It depicts the character Esther Prescott, who is transported from a sheltered, genteel life in the harbourside suburb to a Kings Cross apartment with her moody, unpredictable husband Stan.

== Notable residents ==
- Timothy Conigrave, actor and writer
- Russell Crowe, actor and film producer
- Russell Drysdale, painter
- Kym Johnson and Robert Herjavec, professional ballroom dancer and billionaire businessman and investor
- Jodhi Meares, fashion designer and model
- Maggie Moore, actress
- Peter Overton, television journalist and news presenter
- Jessica Rowe, television news presenter and media personality
- Robert Towns, Member of the Legislative Council and founder of Townsville, Queensland

== Gallery ==
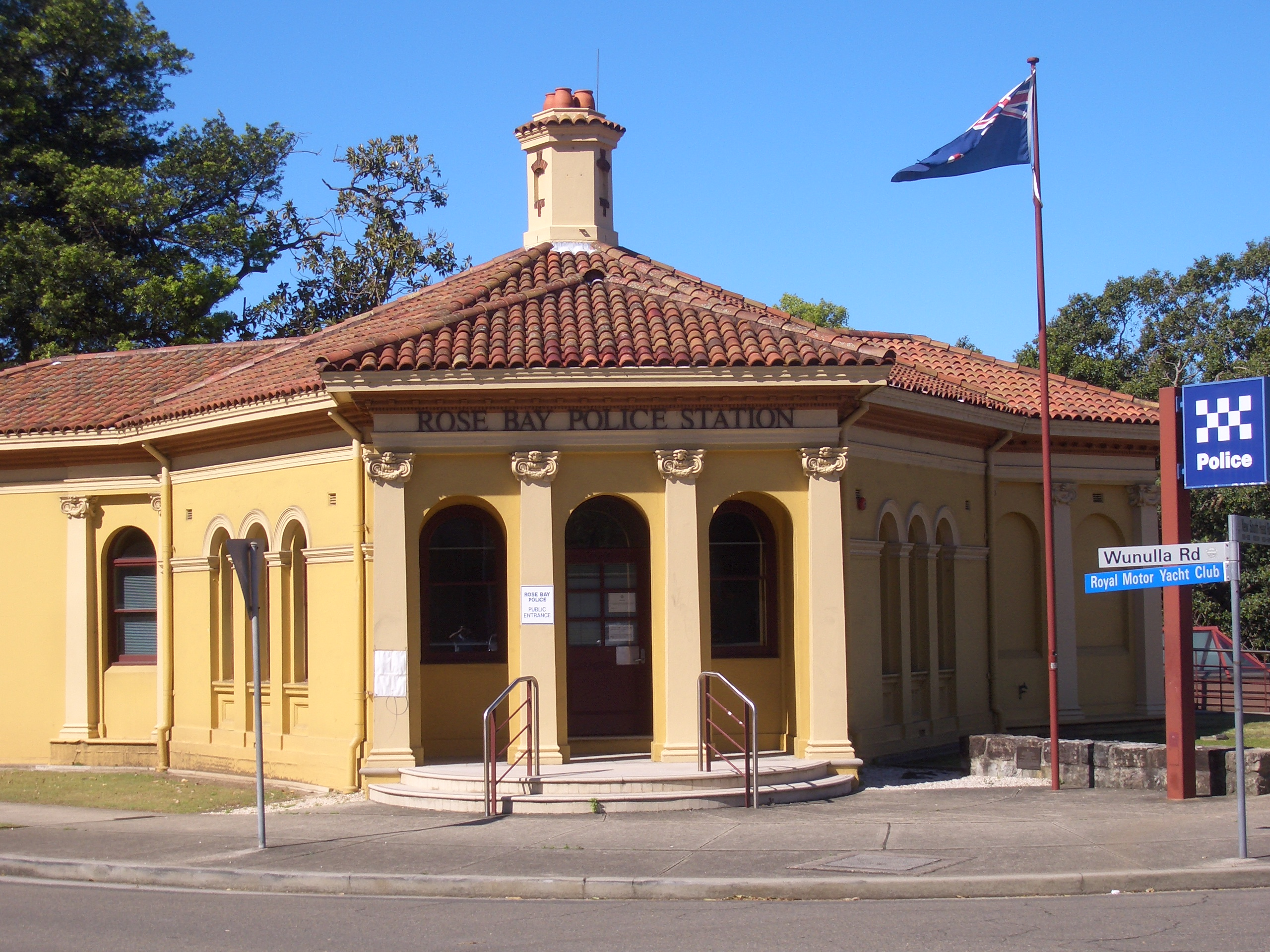
Rose Bay Police Station

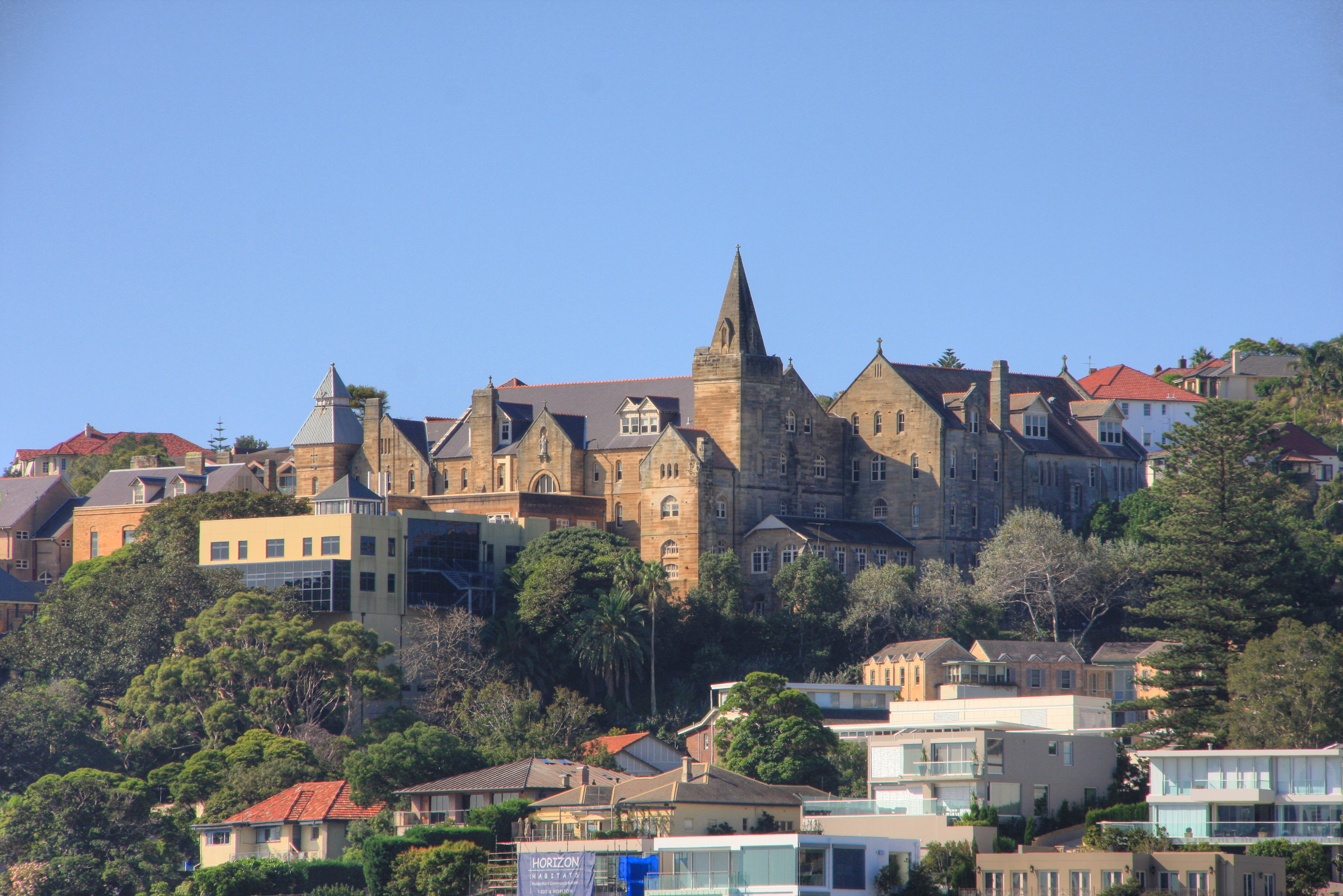
Sacred Heart Convent

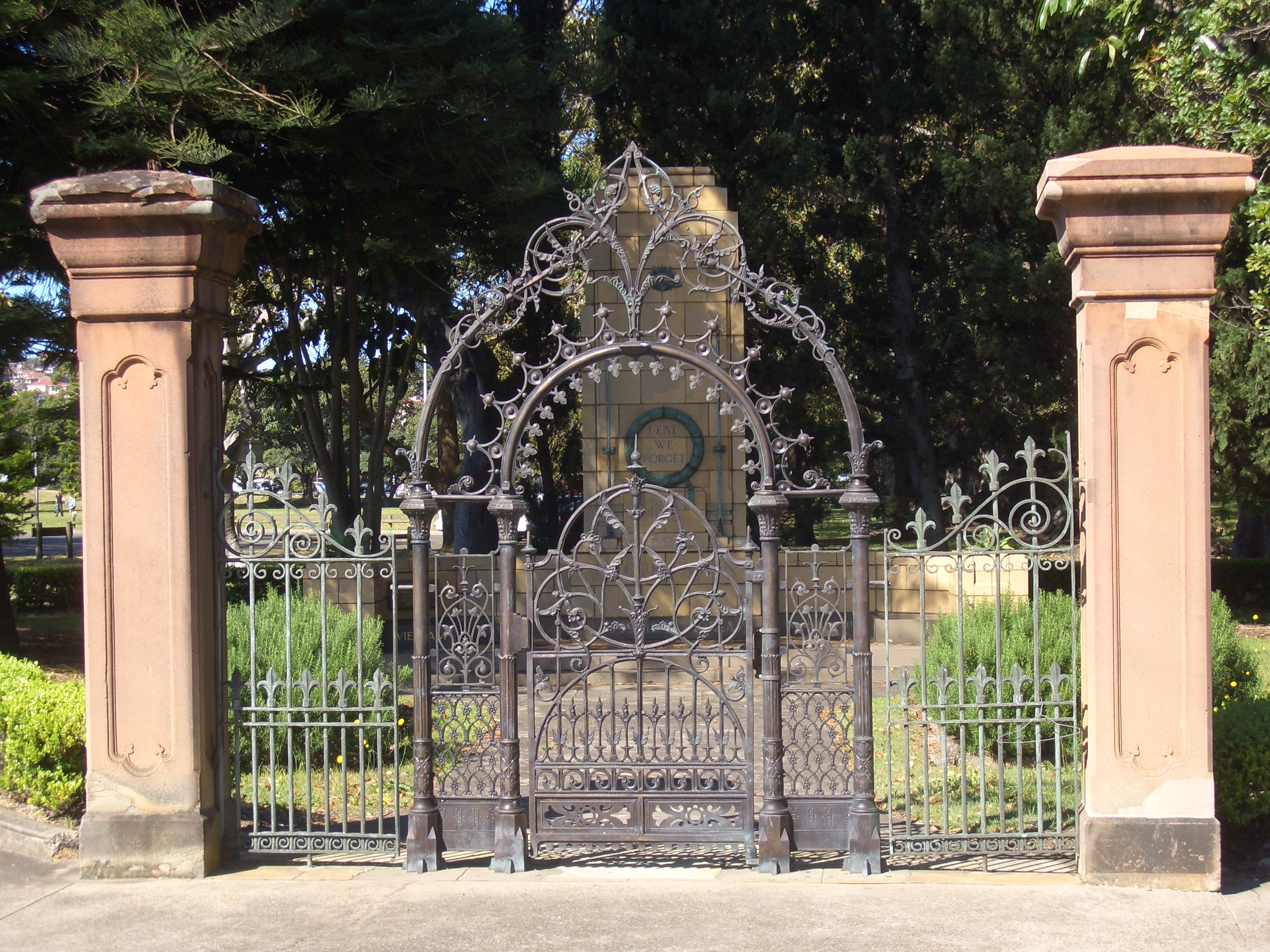
Gate to Rose Bay war memorial

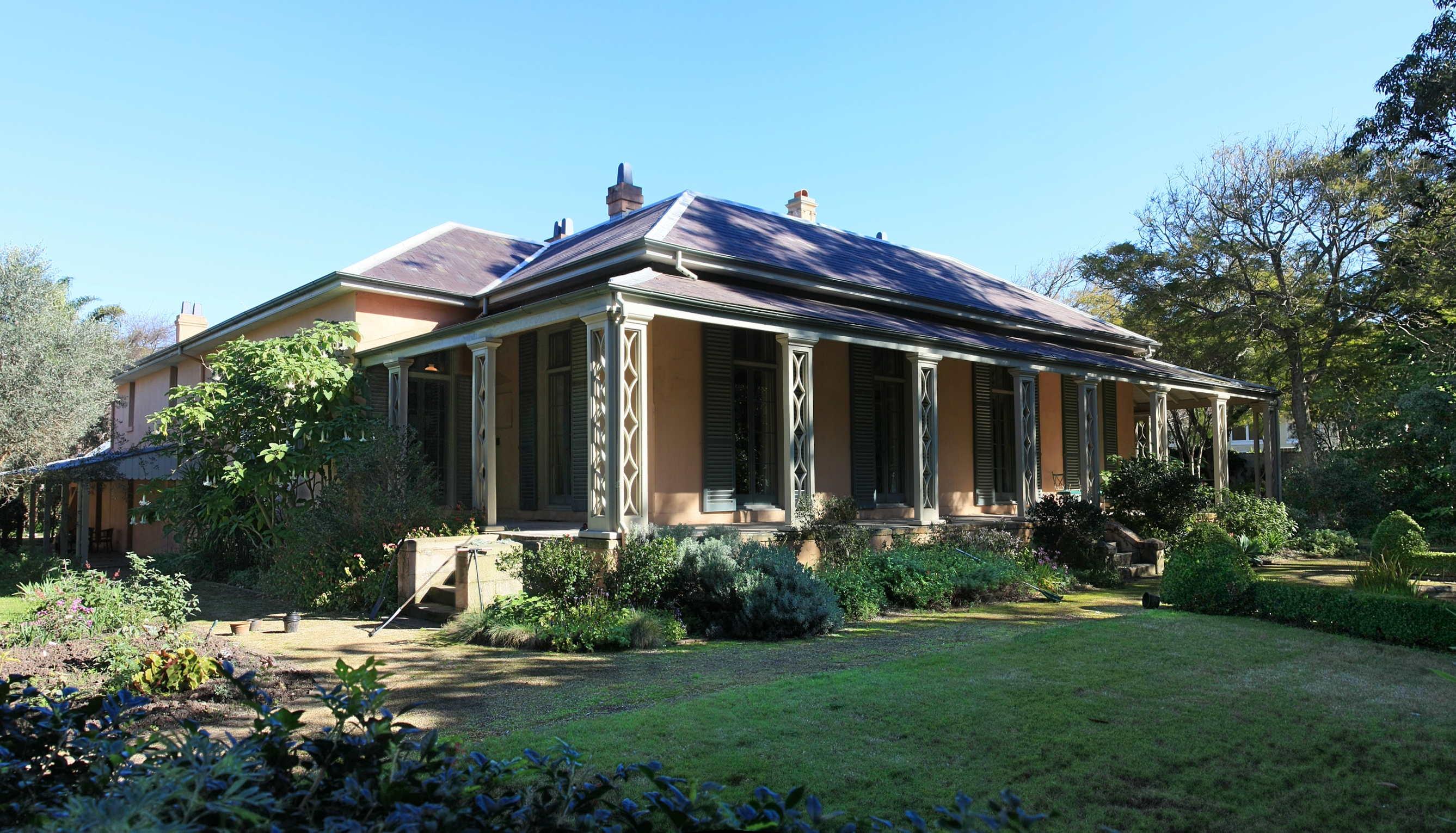
Rose Bay Cottage

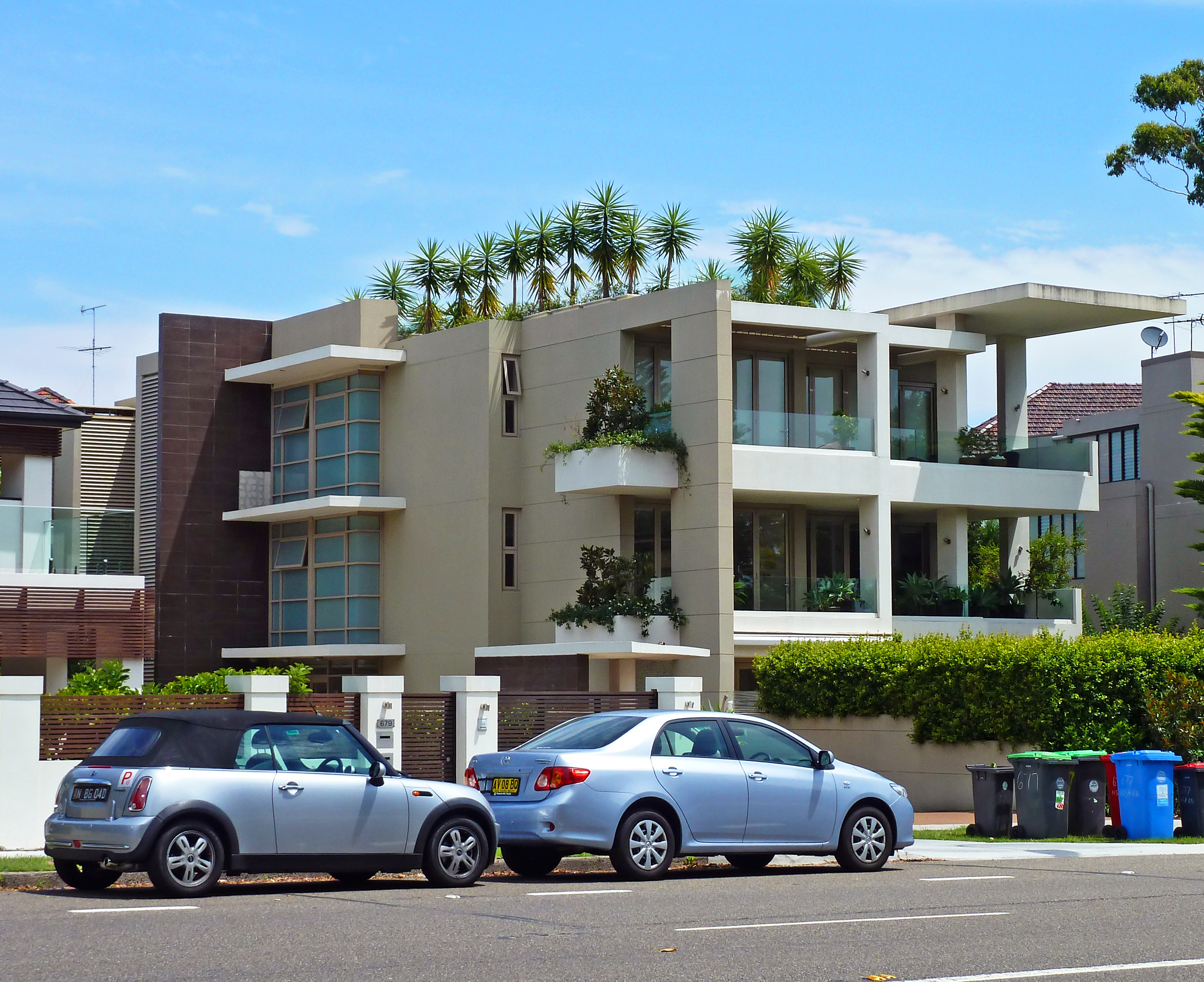
Apartments, New South Head Road

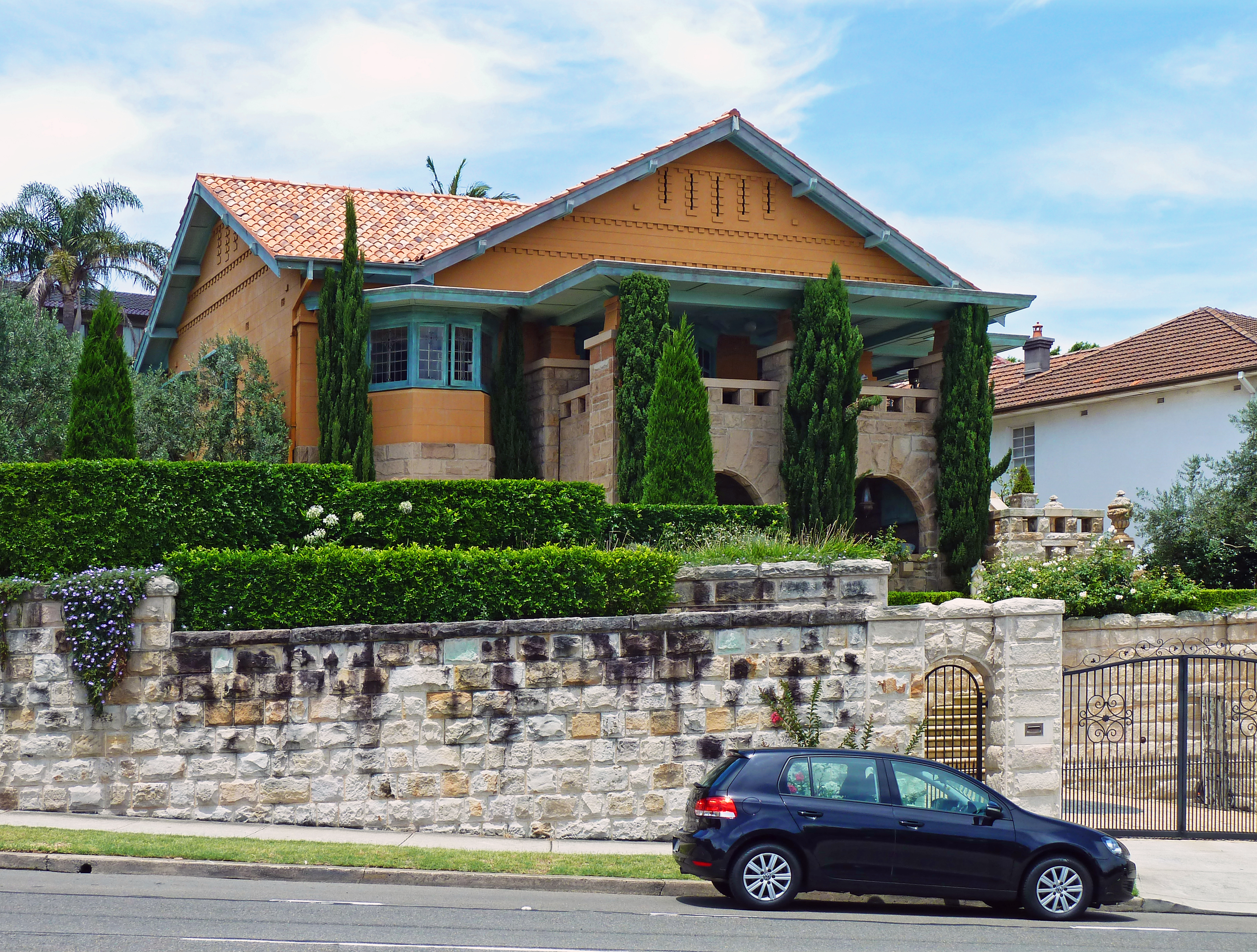
House, 855 New South Head Road
