= Sarah Brennan =

Sarah Brennan may refer to:

- Sarah Rees Brennan (born 1983), Irish fantasy novelist
- Sarah Octavia Brennan (1867–1928), Australian Good Samaritan Sister and teacher
