= Rockwall =

Rockwall can refer to:

== Australia ==
- Rockwall, Potts Point, a heritage-listed house and former school in Potts Point, Sydney

== United States ==
- Rockwall, Texas
- Rockwall County, Texas

== See also ==
- Rockall (disambiguation)
