= Denham Court (homestead) =

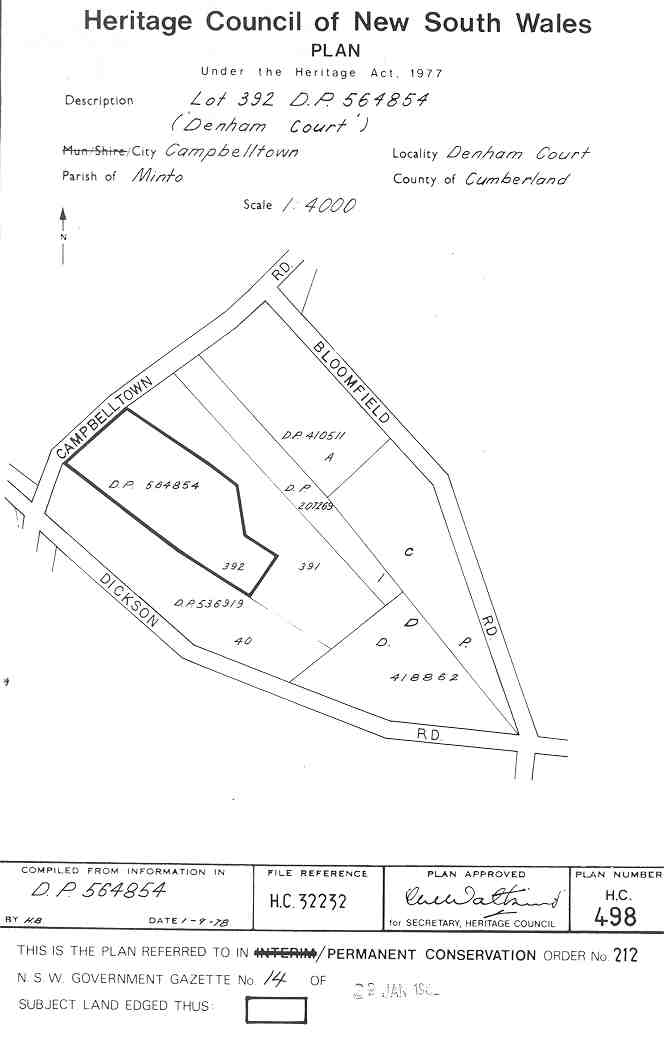
- Heritage boundaries

- Location within Sydney Location within Australia
- 33°59′04″S 150°50′46″E
- Location: 238 Campbelltown Road, Denham Court, City of Campbelltown, New South Wales, Australia

History
- Built: 1820–1829

Site notes
- Architect: John Verge

New South Wales Heritage Register
- Official name: Denham Court
- Type: State heritage (complex / group)
- Designated: 2 April 1999
- Reference no.: 212
- Type: Homestead Complex
- Category: Farming and Grazing

Denham Court is a heritage-listed former residence and farm estate and now residence located at 238 Campbelltown Road, Denham Court, New South Wales, an outer suburb of Sydney Australia. It was designed by John Verge and built from 1820 to 1829. The property is privately owned. It was added to the New South Wales State Heritage Register on 2 April 1999.

== History ==
Glenda Chalker (a Cubbitch Barta clan traditional owner) records corroborees, including local Aboriginal Australian and visiting groups, occurring at the Denham Court estate into the 1850s.

When the first fleet arrived in Sydney Cove in 1788 they found the soil unsuitable for farming and soon looked towards the heavy clay and loam soils of the Cumberland Plain (to the west) to sustain the colony. Early agricultural settlements were located on the rich alluvial soils of the Nepean, Hawkesbury and Georges River areas, as well as South Creek near St.Marys and at the head of the Parramatta River where the settlement of Rose Hill (later Parramatta) was established about six months after the fleet landed. A settlement at the Hawkesbury was established in 1794.

By 1804 much of the Cumberland Plain had been settled and Governor King began to look for other regions in the colony for favourable arable land. The only suitable land within the Cumberland Plain was the area known as the Cowpastures, located in the southwestern corner. This area was named after the discovery in 1795 of cows from the first fleet which had wandered off into the bush. The Cowpastures had remained unoccupied due to the official decree that reserved the land for the wild cattle (to encourage their increase).

In December 1803 Governor King and Mrs King visited the Cowpastures for themselves and the Sydney Gazette reported that Mrs King was the first "white lady" to have crossed the Nepean River. The track to the Cowpastures led from Prospect and on 17 September 1805 James Meehan, under instructions from Governor King, commenced a survey of the track from Prospect to the Nepean Crossing and a rough road followed the marked line. This became known as Cowpasture Road, later the Hume Highway, most of which is today part of the Camden Valley Way.

Several visits to the area by the colonial gentry took place at this time, which resulted in their desire to acquire some of this rich land for themselves. They saw the area as containing very good grazing land. Captain Henry Waterhouse described the area in a letter to John Macarthur in 1804 as follows: " I am at a loss to describe the face of the country other than as a beautiful park, totally divested of underwood, interspersed with plains, with rich luxuriant grass".

Earlier Europeans had described "large ponds covered with ducks and the black swan, the margins of which were fringed with shrubs of the most delightful tints". The Europeans thought the flats were perfect for cattle and the hills would carry sheep. They admired the absence of underbush – probably achieved through Aboriginal burning off – and felt comfortable with a landscape that reminded them of an English gentleman's park.

John Macarthur received the first land grant in the Cowpastures region in 1805 for his role in the early wool industry in the colony. Lord Camden rewarded him with 4,047 hectares (10,000 acres) and Macarthur chose the highly coveted Cowpastures for his grant, though Governor King tried to prevent him taking it. Macarthur also organised an 809 hectares (2,000 acres) grant for his friend Walter Davidson, who allowed Macarthur to use his land freely after Davidson returned to England. In this manner Macarthur controlled 12 miles (19 km) of riverbank on the site where the wild cattle had first discovered the best pasture near Sydney. Later purchases and exchanges increased the Macarthur land there to over 10,927 hectares (27,000 acres), an endowment that Governor Macquarie greatly resented.

Other early grants were in the Parishes of Minto and in adjoining Evan, Bringelly, Narellan and Cook. These all lay west of Parramatta.

Governor Macquarie drew up plans in 1820 for establishment of a town in the area, to be named Campbelltown after his wife Elizabeth's maiden name. With their forced return to England in 1822 these plans never came to fruition and it was not until the arrival of Governor Darling in 1827 that plans were again reinstated and the first settlers were allowed to take possession of their town land in 1831. In the early 1850s the railway line from Sydney to Goulburn was completed, with a station opening at Campbelltown in 1858. When Leppington House was offered for lease in 1865, one of its selling points was that it was near a railway. Campbelltown now provided easy access to Sydney and its markets and grew as the centre of the district. Although Camden was established in 1836, with no railway line it remained a small town.

The large estates that flanked Cowpasture Road (later Camden Valley Way) and the Northern Road were run largely as sheep and cattle farms, with wheat and other grain crops being grown as well until the 1850s. The houses were often built on surrounding ridges or hills, providing sweeping views of the countryside and ensuring that any passing traveller could appreciate the owner's status by viewing their impressive country mansions from the road. This land use pattern of large farm estates and small towns, established in the nineteenth century, remained largely the pattern of development of the area up until the late 1990s. Aerial photographs of the area in 1947 show a rural landscape with some limited urban development on either side of (then) Camden Valley Way.

=== Denham Court ===
Denham Court is situated on a grant of 202 hectares (500 acres) originally made by Governor Macquarie to Judge-Advocate Richard Atkins, a participant in the Bligh Rebellion.

Richard (Bowyer) Atkins (1745–1820), Deputy Judge Advocate, was born on 22 March 1745, the fifth son of Sir William Bowyer, baronet, and his wife Anne, née Stonhouse. He assumed the surname Atkins in recognition of a legacy from Sir Richard Atkins, of Clapham, Surrey, England. On 3 February 1773 he married Elizabeth, née Brady, of Dublin. He procured a military commission and by the 1780s became adjutant to the Isle of Man Corps. Addicted to liquor, immorality and insolvency he led a thoroughly dissolute life. Principally to evade creditors he resigned his commission and sailed for Sydney in the "Pitt", arriving in 1791. He made much of the fame of his brothers, Sir William Bowyer, Lieutenant-General Henry Bowyer and Admiral Sir George Bowyer and of being a close friend of Samuel Thornton, judge-advocate of London, and the governors were impressed.

Atkins was Judge Advocate from 1796 to 1796 and 1800–c. 1809.

Phillip made him a magistrate at Parramatta and in March 1792 appointed him registrar of the Vice-Admiralty Court; this enabled him to enhance the aura of influential prestige behind which he sheltered from existing creditors while engaging fresh credit locally on the security of his family name. It was soon commonplace knowledge that his bills were not met: Rev. Samuel Marsden considered them so doubtful that they might never be honoured. Atkins served as registrar of exports and imports, assistant inspector of public works at Parramatta and temporary superintendent of police, all to the governor's "most perfect satisfaction", and when Macarthur resigned as inspector of public works in 1796 Atkins took his place.

In 1798 Richard Dore arrived to take up a commission as judge-advocate but, when he died in 1800, Atkins was reappointed. Governor King recommended he take the office permanently despite his inebriate habits, for no other person in the colony was "at all equal to that office" and the salary, then about (Pounds) 350 with the benefit of several assigned servants and land grants, was insufficient inducement. Atkins remained the colony's principal legal officer for years. Of commanding stature and fine presence, when sober he was impressive enough to delude creditors and governors alike; but he was ignorant and merciless, an inveterate debauchee. Lieutenant-Governor William Paterson remarked on "his character for low debauchery and every degrading vice as well as a total want of every gentlemanly principle". Governor William Bligh deemed him "a disgrace to human jurisprudence", who 'has been the ridicule of the community. Bligh found it necessary to take legal advice from George Crossley an ex-convict attorney, whom Atkins himself employed as counsellor for many years.

Records of cases before Atkins while judge-advocate reinforce contemporary criticisms of his irresolution and unfamiliarity with law...The most prominent of his adventures on the bench was the trial of John Macarthur in 1808, an incident having an immediate part in the deposition of Bligh. Bligh precipitated the end of his government in adopting Atkins's recommendation that members be charged with treasonable practices. Major Johnston forthwith hastened to Sydney where, urged on by a petition which Macarthur sponsored, he arrested Bligh and took command. Atkins was immediately suspended, but soon made his peace with the rebels, though it was "from necessity alone" that in December 1808 Lieutenant-Governor Joseph Foveaux reinstated him.

This travesty was not long lasting. Atkins's relatives besought the secretary of state to find some permanent position in the colony which would disburden them of their black sheep, but he could be tolerated in public office no longer. Castlereagh ordered his recall, censuring his "want of professional education and practice" which had caused "great inconveniences". This was a mild appraisal of the decrepit old man whom Macquarie thought unlikely to survive his passage. However, he reached England safely and went into retirement. For a time he could not be found to give evidence at Johnston's court martial but he ultimately gave his testimony in a fawning fashion demonstrating his wavering loyalties and feeble character. His attorney in 1817 offered a composition to his creditors in New South Wales, but Atkins remained insolvent until his death in London in 1820.

Atkins was recalled in 1810 and in 1812 the property was bought by Captain Richard Brooks. Brooks acquired adjoining grants of 50 acres and three grants of 200 acres and settled on the land in the mid-1820s although Liston states that there was a small cottage at Denham Court by 1821.

The original house at Denham Court was single storied but in 1832-33 Captain Brooks enlarged it by adding a two-storey (central) wing and two flanking low-fronted one storey wings. This house was designed by architect John Verge as a single-storey small replica of "Denham Court" in Middlesex, England which was erected in 1670.

Richard Brooks (1765?–1833), mariner, merchant and settler, was born at Topsham, Devon, England, son of an impoverished clergyman. He entered the East India Co.'s service at an early age and rose to command his own ship. During the first French revolutionary war he traded to Oporto, the Mediterranean and the Baltic, but later returned to the East India service. He began his association with New South Wales in 1802 when he captained the convict transport "Atlas". After this voyage he earned the censure of Governor Philip Gidley King for the high death rate among the convicts in his charge, largely due to negligence and to overcrowding on board caused by his large personal cargo. The surgeon, Thomas Jamison, brought a civil action for assault against Brooks and the transport commissioners threatened him with prosecution, but he escaped punishment. In 1806 he was captain of another transport, the 'Alexander'; thereafter he made a number of trading trips to the colony, in the "Rose" in 1808, the "Simon Cock" in 1810 and the "Argo" in 1811, and built up large interests in the colony.

As a partner of Robert Campbell, who was part-owner of the "Rose", he was opposed to the rebel government after the deposition of Governor Bligh and refused to give a passage to Captain Symons R.N., the bearer of Joseph Foveaux's dispatches to England. Foveaux then ordered the "Rose" be seized for trading in violation of the East India Co.'s monopoly, but this was a subterfuge and he allowed her to proceed when Brooks agreed to take Symons on board. He entered into a bond for £4000 to account for any irregularity in their trading, but as Brooks was easily able to show that he had been duly licensed by the company, it is perhaps not surprising that he was heard using "some highly disrespectful expressions towards the present government of the colony". Brooks also carried letters on behalf of Bligh and, after the Rose sailed, he had Symons confined as a deserter, and the rebel supporter, John Blaxland, who was also on board, arrested at the Cape of Good Hope.

In February 1813 Brooks was on his way to England in the "Isabella" when she was wrecked near the Falkland Islands, and he sailed to Buenos Aires in a long-boat for help. In July he asked for permission to go to New South Wales as a free settler; he said he had already established a large herd of cattle there, and could increase it if he were granted land. Allowed to go, he arrived in March 1814 with his wife Christiana, née Passmore, daughter of another East India Co. captain, and children in the "Spring". He exchanged his brig for a house at the corner of Pitt and Hunter Streets, and set up business with her cargo. Governor Macquarie granted him land at Cockle Bay (Darling Harbour) in compensation for a grant promised at Farm Cove which had been incorporated in the government Domain, and he began a profitable business supplying meat and provisions to ships, to the public and to the government store. He was also an agent for Lloyd's of London and for shipping which called at Port Jackson.

He suffered during the depression which followed, but this was only a temporary setback. Although in 1816 Governor Macquarie upheld Commissary David Allan in his charge that Brooks was among the most prominent of those settlers who withheld stock during the drought and thus profited by the rise in prices, in January 1817 he granted him 121 hectares (300 acres) in the Illawarra district, and in August appointed him a justice of the peace. Meanwhile, he had strongly supported the establishment of the Bank of New South Wales and in January 1819 he was on the committee of landowners and merchants who petitioned the British government for the repeal of commercial restrictions. In 1823 he moved from Sydney to Denham Court near Liverpool, which he had acquired from Richard Atkins more than ten years before in settlement of debts.

At first they lived in Sydney, but by 1825 they had moved to Denham Court. The hillside estate was one of Sydney's most vibrant social centres of the 1820s and 1830s. Brooks and Christiana had six beautiful daughters and worked to make Denham Court a name to be noticed. Within years the famed colonial architect John Verge had added elaborate wings and a new central section to the house. The dances, laughter and social functions that dominated life at this grand homestead can only be imagined. Ruth Banfield says Captain Brooks' "grand vision" of being the English squire was such that he ordered a private chapel to be built on the estate. Church Road now leads to this St.Mary the Virgin church, supposedly based on a similar structure at Denham in England.

After planning the main front of Denham Court, architect John Verge also designed the small Chapel of St Mary the Virgin built in 1833 slightly to the west of the house on the other side of the highway (now on Church Road).

For the rest of his life he lived there, a prominent settler, a member of the NSW Agricultural Society, a vice-president of the Benevolent Society, member of the committee of the Bible Society, and a strong supporter of religious charities of all denominations. He owned properties in Sydney at Cockle Bay and Surry Hills and had extensive holdings in the Illawarra, Williams River and Lake George districts. He died on 16 October 1833, after being gored by a bull; with his wife, who died on 12 April 1835, he was buried in a vault at Denham Court and the church of St Mary the Virgin was built to enclose their remains.

Of their seven children, sons Richard and Henry became prominent settlers in the Monaro; daughter Christiana married Thomas Valentine Blomfield; another daughter, Honoria, married William Edward Riley of Raby, Catherine Field.

The Reverend Francis Vidal was the Anglican clergyman at St. Mary Magdalene, South Creek (St. Marys) and St. Mary the Virgin, Denham Court, Liverpool during the 1840s, and his brother the Reverend George Vidal was variously the clergyman at St. Peter's Campbelltown, St. Mary the Virgin, Denham Court and St. Thomas, Mulgoa between 1846 and 1865.

By the late 1830s, the property was becoming the nucleus of a small village, with a mill, church and hotel. Christiana and Thomas both died in the 1850s. After some years as a ladies' boarding college run by Miss Sarah Eliza Lester, it became the home of the Blomfields' son Richard.

Margaret Browne (née Riley) grew up at Denham Court, Ingleburn, which had a prominent colonial garden. Browne was the first woman to write a book on gardening in Australia, under the name Mrs Rolf Boldrewood. She wrote letters to the much older Ellen Foreman (née Moore), who lived with her parents at Raby, Catherine Field and later established Ellensville, Mt.Hunter. These letters survive and have been published as a book by Pacita Alexander, showing the ties between the colonial properties of the Cumberland Plain and hints of the influence of those places on the shared joys of gardening.

From the 1860s most of the land was subdivided and sold.

In turn Richard Blomfield's son, Andrew took charge and oversaw a huge subdivision of the Denham Court property (then 1368 acres) in 1884, creating 444 blocks and leaving the old house standing on only 26 acres (10.4ha). Yet few of these blocks were sold.

The 1884 auction brochure included an extensive pictorial record of the estate. There were 66 acres reserved around the house but the house did not sell until 1890 when it was purchased with 81 hectares (200 acres) by Mr J. C. Mayne.

In 1901 the widower Mayne married local lass Maud McDonald. It was their niece, Miss Gowan Flora MacDOnald, who inherited the historic holding and sparked a debate with Campbelltown City Council over naming the suburb "Denham Court" in 1970. She fought tooth and nail to prevent Denham Court being used as the suburb name, making special representations to Liverpool Council asking that the name be applied to the historic Denham Court house and farm, which she owned. Any use of the name for surrounding areas was unauthorised, she argued. She suggested the "Edmondston" name be used instead, honouring locally bred John Edmondson who won the first Australian Victoria Cross for bravery in World War II. Liverpool Council, regarding it as a fine tribute to the local war hero, offered no objection. But the suburb straddled the council (local government area) boundary. And the support of Campbelltown Council was needed prior to any name change - support that was hard to find. Hostile aldermen claimed the "Parish of Denham Court" was a historic name applying to the whole area and not just the house and farm. Council objected. In November 1970 the NSW Geographical Names Board attempted a compromise. It decided to name part of the area within Liverpool boundary as "Edmonson Park", while the remainder would simply be "Denham". This drew unanimous criticism from Campbelltown Council and the war of words continued until 1976, when the full title was finally approved.

Members of the Mayne family lived there until 1957.

Since the 1970s the suburb area has been dotted with impressive mansions on large subdivided blocks. Denham Court Road notes of course the old property. It has wound across the hills since last century, but was only sealed and widened for modern traffic in 1965. Remnants of the old 1884 estate still exist in the form of Brooks Road (after the squire himself), Blomfield Road (in honour of his in-laws) and Dickson Road, after David Dickson, brother-in-law of Richard Blomfield, who helped prepare the subdivision. Woodd Road notes the Rev.G.N.Woodd, an early rector of St.Mary the Virgin church, while Gibson Road possibly recalled another local Anglican Minister, Rev.J.Gibson. Zouch Road pays tribute to Captain Henry Zouch, a police superintendent who had helped pioneer the southern districts of NSW. He had married Brooks' sixth daughter, Maria. Gowan Place honours Gowan Flora MacDonald.

The surrounding area has since been developed with 1 hectare lot (minimum) subdivision which has compromised the (once extensive) views from Denham Court (around and off (east of) what are locally known as 'The Scenic Hills').

The 78ha property has been in the Oakey family's ownership for 35 years since c.1975 (Chancellor, 2010, 2H – Blok (2012) says the Oakeys bought it in 1974). Dr Keith Okey restored the house which he shared with his wife, Patricia and four sons, furnishing it with a magnificent collection of pre-1830s period furniture (predominantly red cedar) pieces and artwork. In 2010 the antique collection – considered one of Australia's finest individual groupings of rare and colonial Australian furniture – was sold by Sotheby's, realising over $2m.

The family put the estate on the real estate market in 2010. An auction by Sotheby's of Keith Oakey's collection of pre-1830 antique furniture etc. took place in May 2010. Dr Keith Okey died in late 2012.

The 2.42 hectare property has been sold to a new owner, Socceroo Jason Culina and his wife, Terri. Jason Culina retired a year ago, about six months after buying Denham Court. The Culinas put the property on the real estate market in March 2014 to move closer to their new interior design business in the city. The property was auctioned on 13 April 2014 and was sold.

== Description ==
=== Site ===
Now comprising 2.42 hectares (6.0 acres). In 2010 it comprised six manicured acres with tennis court.

The site is much reduced (it was 78 hectares (190 acres) in 2000) from its original 202 hectares (500 acres) in 1810 and an additional 250 acres acquired by Brooks during the 1820s. The estate comprising 554 hectares (1,368 acres) was subdivided for sale in 1884 and 27 hectares (66 acres) were reserved around the house but this lot did not sell until 1890 when it was purchased with 81 hectares (200 acres) by the Mayne family, members of whom lived there until 1957. The immediate curtilage is protected and the surrounding area has been developed with 1 hectare lot (minimum) subdivision, compromising views from Denham Court, once extensive.

Denham Court faces east overlooking the valley of the Georges River. On the grassy slopes below the house lines of early ploughing can be seen where wheat and grapes once grew.

The property has manicured gardens with a tennis court and a sandstone coach house.

An informal avenue planting of trees runs east of the symmetrical facade of the house, downhill to its east. This comprises kurrajongs (Brachychiton populneus) and other species.

One nationally rare feature of the site's landscaping is a palo blanco tree (Picconia excelsa), a relative of the olive, from the Canary Islands – a large tree which grows to the north of the house. This species is rarely found in NSW (specimens are in the Royal Botanic Gardens, Sydney, Camden Park and Cooma Cottage, Yass), and only 22 specimens are known around Australia (e.g. Botanic Gardens in Sydney, Melbourne and Geelong; Marybank in the Adelaide Hills; Yasmar, Haberfield and Cooma Cottage, near Yass). This tree is endangered in its natural habitat, the "laurisilva" cloud (rain)forests of the Canary Islands.

=== House ===
The house consists of a two-storey central wing in the Grecian style flanked by single storey bow fronted pavilions with curved sash windows. Cool stone and white stucco are combined within the central two-storey section with its Roman Doric portico over the entrance doorway.

The entrance hall extends the whole width of the central part of the house and is paved with diagonally laid stone. On the wall opposite the front door the stone cantilevered stair rises to the rooms above. Symmetrically placed panelled doors are set in shallow panelled recesses in the side walls, the curves of the recesses being echoed in the arched tops of the corner niches holding candle lamps in the form of classical draped figures. Two glazed doors flank the central front door beneath its stone portico.

The house contains five bedrooms with two bathrooms, living areas including ball room, large formal dining room, large formal living room and library, large rumpus overlooking the in-ground swimming pool. The nearby suburb of Denham Court is named after the property.

=== Outbuilding/Coach House ===
Sandstone coach house with loft.

=== Modifications and dates ===
- 1810: 202-hectare (500-acre) grant
- 1820: Captain Brooks settled at Ingleburn, ex Sydney.
- 1832–33: A two storeyed wing and two one storied wings built. Colonial architect John Verge designed the extensions, based on the design of Denham Court in England which belonged to Judge Advocate Richard Atkins, the original owner of the land grant. An additional 101 hectares (250 acres) was acquired by Brooks during the 1820s.
- 1884: estate comprising 554 hectares (1,368 acres) subdivided for sale and 27 hectares (66 acres) reserved around the house but this lot did not sell until 1890 when it was purchased with 81 hectares (200 acres) by the Mayne family (held until 1957).
- c. 1975: property sold with 78 hectares (190 acres) to the Oakey family.
- 2000: 78 hectares (190 acres). The immediate curtilage is protected and the surrounding area has been developed with 1 hectare lot (minimum) subdivision, compromising views from Denham Court, once extensive.
- 2012: 2 hectares (6 acres) core of property is on the real estate market.

== Heritage listing ==
As at 23 January 2009, Denham Court is one of the most interesting and historically significant early country houses in NSW. The site was granted to Judge-Advocate Richard Atkins and was later acquired by Captain Richard Brooks, a trader operating in the Indicant and Pacific Oceans. He applied to become a free settler and arrived in NSW with his family in 1814. The family came to Denham Court in 1820. The rear buildings at Denham Court are thought to have been built before 1820. The main part of the house, the two-storey front section was designed by John Verge in 1832. The garden contains some remnant colonial and Victorian era plantings, including an informal avenue planting east of the house and a palo alto (Picconia excelsa) tree, which is a rare species nationally.

Denham Court was listed on the New South Wales State Heritage Register on 2 April 1999.

== See also ==
- List of heritage houses in Sydney
