= Saint Scholastica's College =

Saint Scholastica's College may refer to:

- St. Scholastica's College, Manila, a girls' school in the Philippines
- Saint Scholastica's College, Australia, a girls' school located in Glebe Point, Sydney, Australia
- College of St. Scholastica in Duluth, Minnesota, United States
