= Toxteth Park =

Toxteth Park may refer to:

- Toxteth Park, a former royal park, now Toxteth, an inner city area of Liverpool, England
- Toxteth Park, Glebe, an historic house in Sydney, Australia
