= Geraldine Scholastica Gibbons =

Mother superior and founder of Sisters of the Good Samaritan

Mother Geraldine Scholastica Gibbons
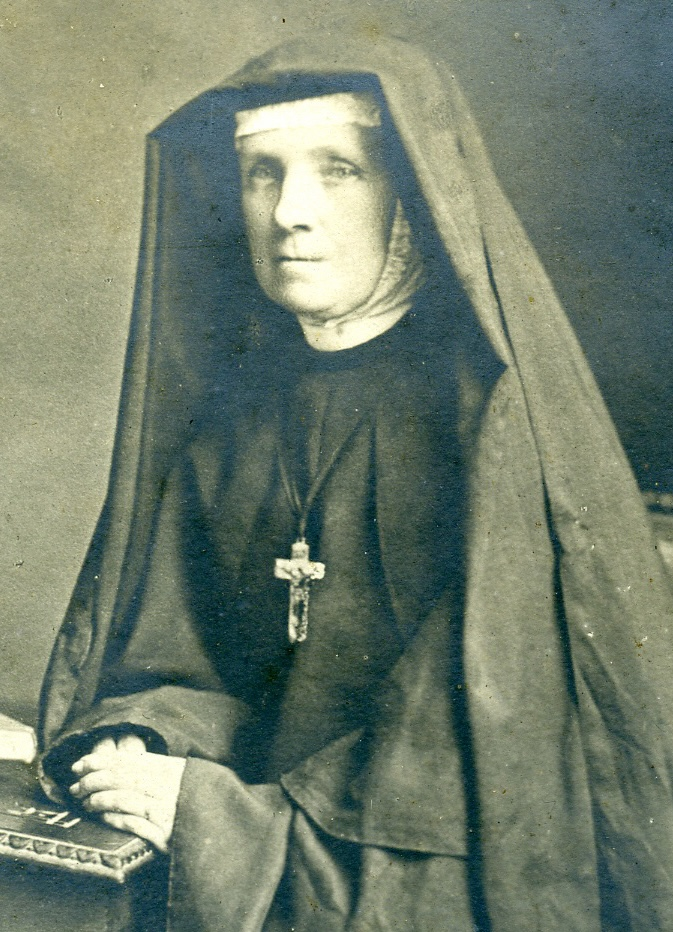

Personal life
- Born: c. 1817 Kinsale, County Cork, Ireland
- Died: 15 October 1901 (aged 85) Five Dock, New South Wales, Australia

Religious life
- Religion: Christian
- Order: Sisters of the Good Samaritan

Mother Geraldine Scholastica Gibbons (c. 1817 – 15 October 1901) was an Irish-Australian nun, founder and first superior of the Sisters of the Good Samaritan.

== Early life ==
Geraldine Scholastica Gibbons was born Geraldine Henrietta Gibbons around 1817 in Kinsale, County Cork. Her parents were Gerald, a landowner, and Mary Gibbons (née Sughrue). She was schooled in Cork. The Gibbons family emigrated to Australia in 1834.

== Religious life ==
Both Gibbons and her older sister joined a congregation of five Irish Sisters of Charity at Parramatta, New South Wales. The Archbishop Bede Polding of Sydney was keen to grow the congregation in his archdiocese, waiving the dowries that Gibbons' father was unable to pay on their behalf. This decision later caused conflict between the Australian recruits and the original Irish sisters.

Gibbons professed as Mary Scholastica on 17 July 1847, and worked at the congregation's mission at a female penitentiary in Parramatta. The convent closed in 1848, the sisters joined with the Sydney convent, where Gibbons founded a home for female penitents there. Polding appointed Gibbons to succeed her sister as superior in 1853, which caused surprise as she had only professed five years earlier. It had been expected that an older Irish sister, Mary Baptist De Lacy, one of the first religious sisters to come to Australia, would be given the position. This sparked tension in the congregation, with De Lacy resigning from her position as rectress of St Vincent's Hospital, Sydney in 1859, claiming pressure for the convent rule to move from Vincentian to a modified Benedictine from the archiepiscopal hierarchy. The resignation led to public debate in local newspapers, in which Gibbons reluctantly engaged, denying any pressure. De Lacy requested permission to return to Ireland, and re-joined the Dublin community.

The issues with the congregation led to Polding founding an Australian congregation. On 2 February 1857 he requested that Gibbons become superior of a new order that would amalgamate her congregation and a new group of women who had formed the Community of the Good Shepherd. They were renamed the Community of the Good Samaritan around 1866 to avoid confusion with a European community. Gibbons remained superior of the new congregation until 6 September 1876, when she returned to the Sisters of Charity, working with the poor in the Hobart convent. She worked there until 1885, but returned to the Good Samaritans at Rosebank convent, Sydney.

== Death ==
Gibbons died on 15 October 1901 at age 85. She was buried in Rookwood Cemetery, Sydney, and was later reinterred at Rosebank College, Sydney in 1945.
