= Clara Jane McLaughlin =

Sister of the Good Samaritan and educator

Mother Berchams
- Title: Superior General

Personal life
- Born: Clara Jane McLaughlin; 25 January 1856 Sodwalls, New South Wales, Australia
- Died: 3 August 1931 (aged 75) Pennant Hill, New South Wales, Australia
- Resting place: Rookwood General Cemetery
- Parent(s): John and Mary Clare McLaughlin

Religious life
- Religion: Catholic
- Denomination: Roman Catholic
- Order: Sisters of the Good Samaritan

Clara Jane McLaughlin (1856-1931), known by her religious name as Mary Berchmans, was an Australian nun who became superior general for the Sisters of the Good Samaritan.

== Biography ==
Clara Jane McLaughlin was born in Sodwalls, New South Wales, Australia, on 25 January 1856. Her parents were John and Mary Clare McLaughlin. Her father was an innkeeper; both her parents emigrated to Australia from County Mayo in Ireland. She was their sixth child. As a young girl, she attended a Sisters of Mercy school in Bathurst.

Drawn to the religious life herself, in 1876 she entered the order of the Sisters of the Good Samaritan. Established in 1857 by John Bede Polding, the Archbishop of Sydney, the Congregation of the Sisters of the Good Samaritan was the first religious congregation for women founded in Australia. They follow the rule of Saint Benedict. Archbishop Polding established the order to respond to the need of poor women and children in Sydney, and the order focused on charitable works and education. They were often known as the "Good Sams."

When McLaughlin professed her final vows on 25 March 1879, she chose the religious name of Mary Berchmans. She began teaching at the order's school in New South Wales.

In 1890, Berchmans was appointed superior of the St. Patrick's convent, located in Campbelltown. After serving at St. Patrick's for three years, she was appointed superior of the Rosebank convent, where she served from 1893 to 1898. By the 1890s, the Congregation of the Sisters of the Good Samaritans had just under fifty communities, all but one located in New South Wales.

Mother Berchmans was appointed superior general of the congregation of the Sisters of the Good Samaritan on 21 December 1898. During the next eighteen years, she oversaw the expansion of the Congregation, with the addition of thirty new communities in four states. The number of sisters in the order increased from 167 to 373. She was an advocate for the Congregation's autonomy, resisting diocesan control of the order. She also oversaw changes to the teaching methods in the schools run the by order, to incorporate current pedagogical methods. In 1901, she founded a new mother house in Glebe, St. Scholastica's convent, and established a secondary school. In 1906, she oversaw the opening of St. Scholastica's Training College.

She retired as superior general in 1916, but served as assistant-general for another twelve years. In 1926, she became superior of the Pennant Hill community, where she lived until her death on 3 August 1931. She is buried at the Rookwood General Cemetery.
