= Mary Baptist De Lacy =

Australian Sister of Charity, founded St Vincent's Hospital, Sydney

Sister Mary John Baptist de Lacy

Personal life
- Born: Alicia De Lacy; 1 July 1799 Limerick, Kingdom of Ireland
- Died: 12 December 1878 (aged 79) Dublin, Ireland, United Kingdom
- Resting place: Donnybrook, Dublin, Ireland
- Known for: founding St. Vincent hospital in Woolloomooloo, Australia

Religious life
- Religion: Catholicism
- Order: Religious Sisters of Charity
- Monastic name: Mary John Baptist de Lacy, RSC
- Profession: 25 September 1837

Mary John Baptist De Lacy RSC (born Alicia De Lacy; 1 July 1799 – 12 December 1878) was an Irish Sister of Charity, and one of the first religious sisters to come to the British colony of Australia. She was one of five Religious Sisters of Charity who arrived in Sydney from Ireland in 1838 to serve poor women convicts. She founded and managed the St. Vincent Hospital in Woolloomooloo. She lived in Australia until 1859, when she returned to Ireland, spending her final years in the Sisters of Charity Mother House in Dublin.

== Early life ==
Alicia De Lacy was born on 1 July 1799, in Limerick, Ireland. At age 35, she joined the religious life. She became a novice with the Sisters of Charity at their convent in Dublin on 24 September 1835, and professed her final vows on 25 September 1837. The Congregation of the Sisters of Charity are an order founded by Mary Aikenhead in Dublin in 1815. It was the first unenclosed order for women in Ireland; this meant that the women did not need to stay in a cloister but could minister in the community. Mother Aikenhead wanted the sisters to serve the needs of the poor.

De Lacy took on the religious name Mary John Baptist when she entered the order, and was known as Sister Baptist. She trained as a nurse at the new St. Vincent's Hospital in Dublin, which Mother Aikenhead had opened in 1834. This was the first hospital staffed by religious women in the English-speaking world. The Sisters accepted patients of all faiths. This openness was unusual, as there were long-standing tensions in Ireland between Roman Catholics and Protestants.

== Australia ==
The first Catholic bishop of New South Wales, Australia, John Bede Polding, reached out to Mary Aikenhead in 1836, while he was on a trip to England, and asked if some of the Sisters of Charity might come to Australia to establish a congregation in his diocese. He wanted help in providing services to the poor women convicts who were being sent to the penal colony. Aikenhead asked for volunteers to take on this mission work.

When De Lacy joined the order, she expressed her interest in traveling to Australia, and participating in the establishment of the new congregation. Three other Sisters volunteered: Mother John Cahill, who became the superior of the congregation; F. De Salca O'Brien, Lawrence Cator. Xavier Williams, who was a novice at the time, also volunteered to go.

The five women left Dublin on 18 August 1838. They sailed on the vessel Francis Spaight, and during the course of their journey, there was a mutiny during the voyage. The sisters are said to have acted as mediators, helping to resolve the dispute. They arrived in Sydney on 31 December 1838. They were the first religious sisters to arrive in Australia.

Not long after their arrival, the sisters established a convent in Parramatta, where there was a "female factory" where convict women worked. The sisters lived in austerity; they were dependent on dispensations of money from Bishop Polding, who controlled the funds sent from Ireland to support the convent. Charitable donations from neighbors and supporters also helped support the work of the Sisters.

De Lacy was one of the Sisters involved in establishing the first orphanage run by the order, the Catholic Orphan School, located in Waverly, New South Wales. She worked at the orphanage from 1839 to 1840 and then returned to the convent in Parramatta. Along with other sisters, she ministered to prisoners in the Darlinghurst Gaol. She took notes based on her visitations with the convicts; these original records have been preserved, and offer a valuable window into the events and conditions of the time.

In 1847, De Lacy oversaw the opening of a hospital in Woolloomooloo, the first hospital to be run by the Sisters of Charity in Australia. The hospital was designed to serve the poor, and accepted patients of all religious backgrounds, which was in keeping with the approach taken by Mary Aikenhead in Dublin. This approach was not without its critics; in Australia, as in Ireland, there were deeply partisan feelings between Protestants and Catholics, and few institutions catered to both. Sister De Lacy would be involved in the management of St. Vincent's Hospital (named after the hospital founded by Mary Aikenhead in Dublin) from its founding until her departure from Australia in 1859.

== Conflict and departure ==
In 1859, a conflict emerged that led to De Lacy's removal from her post at St. Vincent's Hospital, and her subsequent return to Ireland. A priest named Father Kenyon removed the Protestant Bibles in the hospital, which had been provided for Protestant clergy who came to minister to Protestant patients at the hospital. At that time, hospitals did not employ chaplains, but depended on local clergy to visit patients. The removal was met with an outcry, and the books were returned, after an appeal was made to Archbishop Polding.

The superior of the Sisters of Charity subsequently removed De Lacy from her role as the hospital rectress, or administrator. As described in the paper, the reasons given were partly to do with the use of the Protestant Bibles, and partly because of the use of a water pump to gather water for the hospital, which was done without direct approval by the order. It was suggested by some that there were other factors at play, and that ongoing tension between De Lacy and Archbishop Polding contributed to her removal.

After her demotion, De Lacy returned to Ireland to rejoin her order at their Mother house in Dublin. She sailed on the Star of Peace. Her departure was met with distress by many lay Catholics who appreciated her work at the hospital. Archbishop Polding tried to force her to return from Ireland, but was not successful. De Lacy served another twenty years as a Sister of Charity in Dublin, before her death in 1878.

== Death and legacy ==
De Lacy died on 12 December 1878, at age 79. She is buried at Donnybrook Cemetery in Dublin.

A Heritage Center honoring the work of the Sisters of Charity in Australia has been established in Potts Point, Sydney, New South Wales. The center was opened in 2019. It tells the stories of the five pioneering Sisters who arrived in 1838 as well as subsequent developments and achievements of the order.

De Lacy House at St. Vincent's College at Potts Point is named after her.

De Lacy House at St. Columba College in South Australia is also named after her.

De Lacy Place in the Canberra suburb of Chisholm was named in her honour.

== See also ==
- Mary Aikenhead
- Geraldine Scholastica Gibbons
