= Rockall (disambiguation) =

Rockall is a small, uninhabited, remote rocky islet in the North Atlantic Ocean.

Rockall may also refer to:

- Rockall Basin, sedimentary basin to the west of Ireland and the UK beneath a major deepwater area (Rockall Trough) named after the islet
- Rockall, a BBC Radio Shipping Forecast area named after the islet
- The Band from Rockall, a band named for the islet and eponymous album
- Rockall score, clinical risk assessment, named for Tim Rockall
- Taryn Rockall (born 1977), Australian football (soccer) player

== See also ==
- Island of Rockall Act 1972, British Act of Parliament formally incorporating the island into the UK to protect it from Irish and Icelandic claims
- Seán Dublin Bay Rockall Loftus (1927-2010), Irish environmentalist, barrister and politician
- Rockwall (disambiguation)
