= Patty Fawkner =

Australian Good Samaritan sister

Sister Patty Fawkner SGS

Personal life
- Born: Sydney

Religious life
- Religion: Christianity
- Denomination: Roman Catholic
- Order: Sisters of the Good Samaritan

Senior posting
- Previous post: Congregational Leader

Sister Patty Fawkner is an Australian religious sister, educator and writer, who is a former Congregational Leader of the Sisters of the Good Samaritan of the Order of St Benedict. This was the first religious congregation founded in Australia in 1857, and now has communities in Australia, Japan, the Philippines and Kiribati.

== Early life and education ==
Fawkner is originally from Sydney and grew up in the western suburbs. She was educated by both the Presentation Sisters and the Sisters of the Good Samaritan. She has tertiary qualifications in arts, education, theology and spirituality.

After joining the 'Good Sams', Fawkner trained and ministered as a primary school teacher, later becoming a school principal and a diocesan religious education consultant. Patty transitioned to adult education after completing her theology degree.

== Religious life and ministry ==
Fawkner was elected as the congregation leader of the Sisters of the Good Samaritan from 2017-2023. Her religious ministry has included a diverse range of roles, including adult educator, writer and facilitator. She has served as a religious education consultant, a communications officer with Catholic Religious Australia, the Director of UNIYA Jesuit Social Justice Centre, and a member of the Good Samaritan Council. Fawkner's work explores the wisdom of the Christian tradition on contemporary issues, the role of women in the church, and questions of justice and spirituality.

Fawkner has written and spoken extensively about these issues, with articles published on multiple platforms. She is a regular contributor to The Good Oil magazine, which in 2019 received an award for Overall Excellence in a Catholic Publication at the Australasian Catholic Press Association Awards. Fawkner was honoured in the 'Best Column' category for her regular section, 'It occurred to me'. The judges noted the way Fawkner wove together "her excellent knowledge of theology with warm and wise discussion of the contemporary issues that face the Church and its followers." They described her column as "erudite, intelligent and thought provoking."

Fawkner has held multiple leadership roles in the Catholic Church in Australia and has been invited to speak on contemporary issues facing the church in many forums. She was invited to speak about the spirituality of aging at an Australian Catholic Bishops' event. In 2019, she was elected as the Vice President of Catholic Religious Australia. In April 2021, she contributed to the Australian Women Preach podcast, an initiative of Women and the Australian Church. She was a participating Council Member in the first General Assembly of the Fifth Plenary Council of the Catholic Church in Australia in October 2021, and a member of the Council's Steering Committee.

== Select publications ==
=== Books ===
- Fawkner, Patty. Dare the church? David Lovell, Ringwood, Vic, 2004.
- A fair go in an age of terror: Uniya's Jesuit Lenten seminars 2003 & 2004 / edited by Patty Fawkner. David Lovell, Ringwood, Vic, 2004.
- Fawkner, Patty. A big enough God. Catholic Adult Education Centre, Sydney, 1999.
- Fawkner, Patty, and Catholic Adult Education Centre (Sydney, N.S.W.). Rejoice Great South Land: The Journey to Jubilee 2000. Catholic Adult Education Centre, 1997.
- Fawkner, Patty & Catholic Adult Education Centre (Sydney, N.S.W.) A time for every purpose: 1997 Sydney Archdiocesan Lenten programme. Catholic Adult Education Centre, Sydney, Revesby, N.S.W, 1997.
- Fawkner, Patty, et al. Hidden in Pain, Risen in Love: Sydney Archdiocesan Lenten Programme 1996. Catholic Adult Education Centre, Sydney, 1996.
- Fawkner, Patty. Suicide: a challenge for hope. Catholic Adult Education Centre, Sydney, 1996.

== See also ==
- Sisters of the Good Samaritan
- The Good Oil Archive
- Rodrigues, Marilyn, Social justice: at the heart of being Catholic: a conversation with Good Samaritan and 'woman of hope' Sr Patty Fawkner Catholic Weekly, vol. 64, no. 4292 (27 November 2005): pp. 9-10.
