= John Verge =

English architect, builder and pioneer settler

- Born: 1782; Christchurch, Hampshire
- Died: 9 July 1861 (aged 78–79); Austral Eden, near the Macleay River, New South Wales, Australia
- Occupation: Architect
- Spouses: 1. Catherine née Bowle (m. 1804; dis. 1828); 2. Mary, née Alford (m. 1858)
- Children: George Philip Verge (to Bowle); Austral Verge (to Alford); Sydney Verge (to Alford); German Verge (to Alford); Eden Verge (to Alford); Auburn Verge (to Alford)
- Buildings: Bedervale; Camden Park Estate; Denham Court (homestead); Elizabeth Bay House; Rockwall, Potts Point; Salisbury Court; Toxteth Park, Glebe; 39-41 Lower Fort St, Miller's Point Wyoming Cottage, Central Coast
- Design: Greek Revival style; Victorian Regency style

John Verge (1782–1861) was an English architect, builder, pioneer settler in the Colony of New South Wales, who migrated to Australia and pursued his career there. Verge was one of the earliest and the most important architect of the Greek Revival in Australia. He also brought more comprehensive range of Regency style than any contemporary architects. His design indicates the increasing of sophistication compared to previous architect's design.

== Life and career ==
John Verge was born in Christchurch, Hampshire. Many generations of the Verge family had been bricklayers and stonemasons. Verge married to Catherine Bowles at the age of twenty-two and went to London. From 1804 to 1828, he worked in London in the building trade, becoming a man of means. Verge's marriage eventually failed and, in 1828, he migrated to Sydney, New South Wales, Australia, with his son George Philip, intending to take up a land grant. The first land grant in 1829, he took up land on the Williams River, south of Dungog, called Lyndhurst Vale. The second land grant in 1838, he took up land on the Macleay River named Austral Eden. Having insufficient capital to pursue pastoralism, Verge returned to the building industry between 1830 and 1837, fortuitously at a time when the colonial economy was prospering and designers and builders were in high demand. Between 1830 and 1834 was his maximum architectural activities. He was patronised by many of prominent businessmen and colonists. After 1837, his architectural work was decreasing and restricted. Retiring from architectural practice, he settled at Austral Eden, a pastoral property by the Macleay River in northern New South Wales. In 1858, Verge married Mary, 50-year-old daughter of John Alford at Austral Eden. Verge died on 9 July 1861 at the age of 79 in Austral Eden. He was buried as an Anglican in St. Thomas's burial ground in Port Macquarie.

In the 1830s, Verge produced a number of fine houses in Sydney's eastern suburbs, notably several of the 'Villas of Woolloomooloo Hill', the spine of elegant villas largely built by the senior civil servants of the colony on a series of land grants that stretched from Darlinghurst Hill to Potts Point. These villas included Rockwall, built for surveyor John Busby, Tusculum for merchant Alexander Brodie Spark for whom Verge also designed Tempe House, and Goderich Lodge, for Thomas Macquoid. Others including Barham and Rose Bank have been attributed to his hand. Further east he built Rose Bay Lodge for James Holt. To the west of the town he built Lyndhurst, for Dr James Bowman, and Toxteth Park for George Allen, in Glebe. Verge is also credited with Elizabeth Bay House, built at adjacent Elizabeth Bay for Alexander Macleay, the Colonial Secretary. It is theorised that Verge largely worked on a plan provided by Macleay, as his business ledger does not denote amounts that would reflect a full commission. John Bibb, an accomplished draftsman employed by Verge, also worked on the project and James Hume from Scotland supervised the building. The relative contributions of Verge, Bibb and Hume are unknown. The house's beautiful oval saloon, with its geometric stair and domed lantern, is likely the most celebrated interior in early Australian architecture.

Verge's work was not confined to Sydney. Bedervale homestead, near Braidwood, built in 1842, was designed by Verge. Aberglasslyn, built for George Hobler near Maitland, NSW, has been attributed to Verge. Like Elizabeth Bay House it never received its intended colonnade, the victim of the crippling colonial depression of the 1840s. Wyoming Cottage, built between 1832 and 1843, is located in the suburb of that name north of Gosford. The house he built for himself at Austral Eden was unfortunately destroyed by flood in 1864, three years after Verge's death, and no known sketches survive. Most of his papers were also lost in the flood.

Verge's best known work is Camden Park House, built south west of Sydney for John Macarthur, the wool pioneer and successful colonial businessman. As Macarthur was debilitated towards the end of his life with mental illness his son William seemed to have administered much of the building, and is named in Verge's ledger rather than his father. This has caused confusion with some architectural historians as to the actual client.

From 1947 to 1954 G. Nesta Griffiths, who had stayed at many Australian country houses, wrote several books about the houses of New South Wales and their heritage. She is creditted with reviving interest in the works of John Verge.

== Main projects ==
=== Camden Park, Menangle (1835) ===
Camden Park House is completed on 1835, a year after John Macarthur, the client's death. This house is still occupied by the Macarthur family and become one of the great mansions of Australia. The style of this house is Palladian style with central two-storey block, one-storey wings and extensions at each side. The façade is giving a colonial elegancy sense of looking, where there are white stucco walls, stone porch and window trimming that results a visual excellency of feeling. This colonial house's floor level is very near to ground level, which gives an air of intimacy, and also the overhanging roof has a secret gutter that avoids the ugly-looking gutter which usually put it in the front façade of the wall.

=== Denham Court, Ingleburn (1832) ===
Denham Court which is located in the local government areas of the City of Campbelltown and City of Liverpool placed on south west of the Sydney Central Business District. Originally, this building was a single-storey house but around 1832 to 1833, Captain Richard Brooks as an architect was enlarging this house by adding two-storey wings with two flanking bow-fronted one storey room. This court is regency influenced with trim lines, stucco walls, and the simple shallowly recessed panels projecting porch. Denham Court's room is 14 feet high with a geometrical stair along the west wall of the house and also there is a large living hall that extending across the width of the house between the bows fronted. The floor in this house is paved with flagstones diagonally with 18 inches square each. Moreover, in the west of this court, there is a Denham Court chapel, which is a mimic of the church at Denham in England. Those churches were designed by John Verge as well with the style of it is Gothic, where mostly this style is taking over the style of every church.

=== Elizabeth Bay House (1835–1838) ===
Elizabeth Bay House, which is a historic home, is located in the suburb of Elizabeth Bay in Sydney, New South Wales, and Australia. It is built between 1835 and 1839. It was known as 'the finest house in the colony' as well as a home in the Regency style, originally surrounded by a 54-acre garden, but now situated within a densely populated inner city suburb. It shows Verge at his best and worst as a designer. The main elevation is a simple Regency front, whilst the sides, less ambitious but perhaps more pleasing, have large curved bays, running through the two floors. The general impression given by the design is of quietness and good taste, the severely stuccoed walls being relieved only by the somewhat stiff mouldings run in the plaster work and the elaboration of the entrance. The rear of the house is unstudied and lacks the neatness of the other elevations. The interior has some splendid rooms, the stair hall being one of the finest and perhaps the best, of such things in Australian Colonial architecture. Elliptical on plan, the stair and its upper landings sweep completely round the curved walls. The French windows on the northern front give beautiful light and superb views to main apartment. Verge seems to tire and falter when trying to coordinated all the parts into a whole.

=== Rockwall House, Potts Point (1831–1837) ===
Rockwall House, which is still well-known, is located at Rockwall Crescent that is the well-preserved Regency house that Verge designed for John Bushby. It is quite close to Tusculum. The Rockwall House shows Verge in his most restrained and pleasing mood, although the columned porch seems to overpower the flanking verandas in scale.

=== St Scholastica's College (1831–1900) ===
St Scholastica's College, which used to be Toxteth Park George Allen Estate, is located in Avenue Road, Glebe, built in 1831. Toxteth Park was built for George Allen (1800–77). It was a rectangular two-story block with single-story wings, s a stone-flagged veranda on two sides, with the kitchen and servants' quarters behind. The style of St Scholastica's College is original structure Old Colonial Georgian (still visible), Second story and tower Victorian Italianate added in the 1870s. Handsome Inter-War Romanesque chapel added in the twenties. It is made of brick. Moreover, it was originally House, then convent and Education.

== Partial list of works ==
The following buildings designed either in part or in full by Verge are listed on various national, state and local government heritage registers:

Buildings designed either in part or in full by John Verge
Building name	Image	Location	Year completed	Australian National Heritage List	NSW State Heritage Register	Local government register	Notes
Aberglasslyn House		Aberglasslyn, Maitland	c. 1840		00195		
Barham		Darlinghurst, Sydney	1833			City of Sydney (#I301)	(now SCEGGS Darlinghurst)
Bedervale		Braidwood	1836		00017		
Brownlow Hill		Cobbitty	1834				Alterations attributed to Verge
Camden Park Estate		Menangle	1835		01697		
Christ Church		Bong Bong	1845		01383		
Church of the Holy Innocents		Rossmore	c. 1848				Possibly by Verge and John Bibb
Denham Court (extensions and chapel)		Ingleburn	1832–1838		00212		
Elizabeth Bay House		Elizabeth Bay, Sydney	1835–1838	2000	00006		
Elizabeth Farm (Extensions, coachhouse and stables)		Parramatta	c. 1830s		00001		
Lietrim (renamed Pine Villa in 1843)		Newtown, Sydney	1833				
Lyndhurst		Glebe, Sydney	1833–1837		00158		
Rockwall House		Potts Point, Sydney	1831–1837		00020		
Salisbury Court		Rose Bay, Sydney	1834		00251		
St James' Church (vestries at the eastern end framed by two small porticos, and a similar portico as an entrance to the tower)		Queen's Square, Sydney CBD	1834		01703		
St Paul's Church		Cobbitty	c. 1840				
Tempe House		Arncliffe, Sydney	1836		00725		
Tomago House		Raymond Terrace	1843				Attributed to Verge
Toxteth Park		Glebe, Sydney	1831				(now St Scholastica's College)
Wyoming Cottage		Gosford	1837–1843		00213	197	

== See also ==
- List of buildings designed in full or in part by John Verge
