= Toxteth Park, Glebe =

Toxteth Park
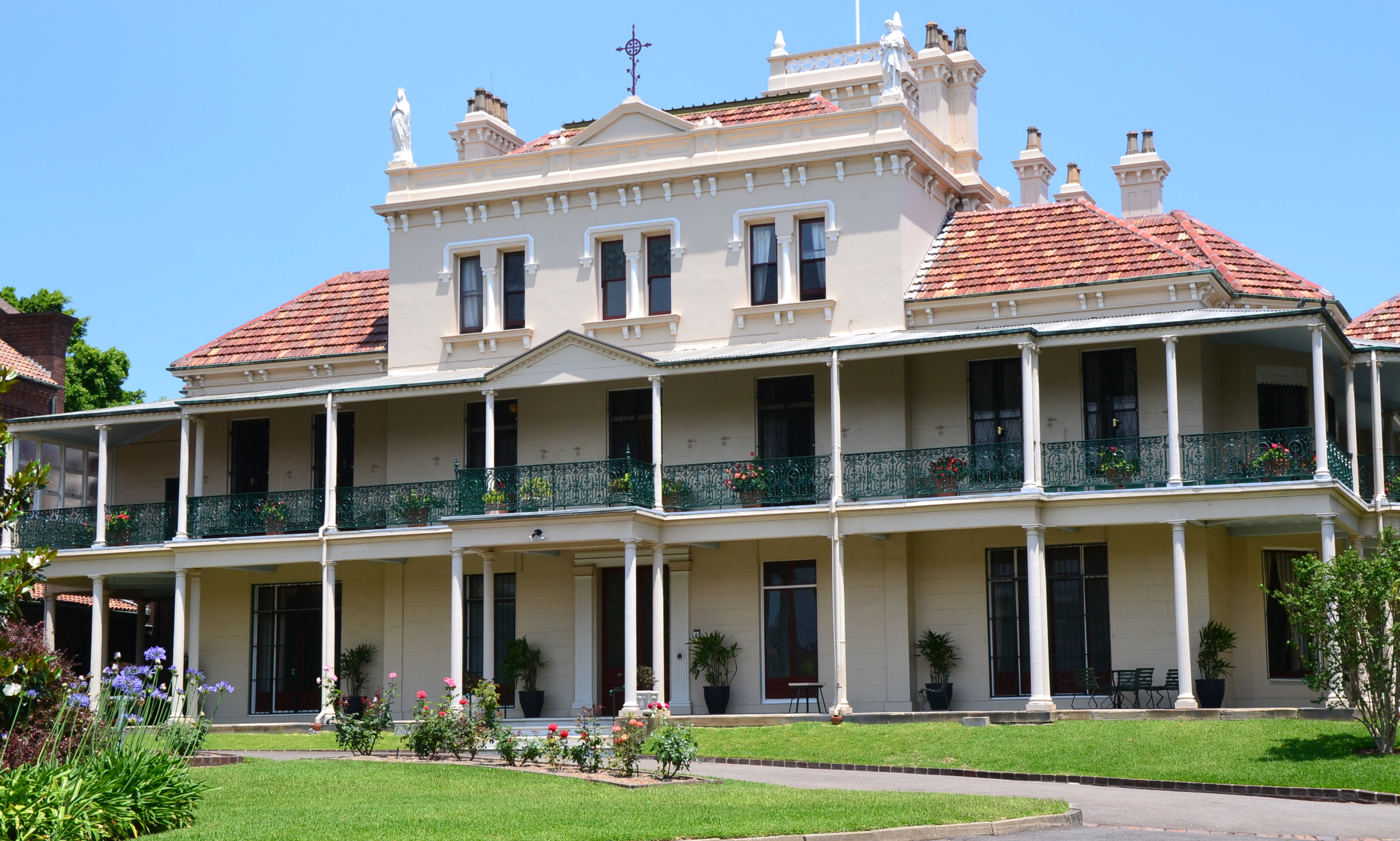
- Toxteth Park, now located in St Scholastica's College

- Location within inner Sydney
- 33°52′34″S 151°10′52″E
- Location: Glebe, City of Sydney, New South Wales, Australia

History
- Built: 1829
- Built for: George Allen

Site notes
- Architect: John Verge
- Owner: St Scholastica's College

New South Wales Heritage Database (Local Government Register)
- Official name: House "Toxteth Lodge" Including Interior; St Scholastica's College including buildings and their interiors, fencing, and grounds

Toxteth Park is an historic house that now houses St Scholastica's College, Glebe, an inner-city suburb of Sydney, in New South Wales, Australia. The house was designed and built in 1829 by John Verge. The house and estate are listed in the New South Wales Heritage Database as a site of local historical significance.

The house was owned by two generations of the Allen family and in 1901 was purchased by the Catholic Church and became a convent and a school. The building is now used by the Sisters of the Good Samaritan as the "Good Samaritan Congregational Centre" and is available for small group historical tours by arrangement.

== Ownership ==
=== George and Jane Allen ===
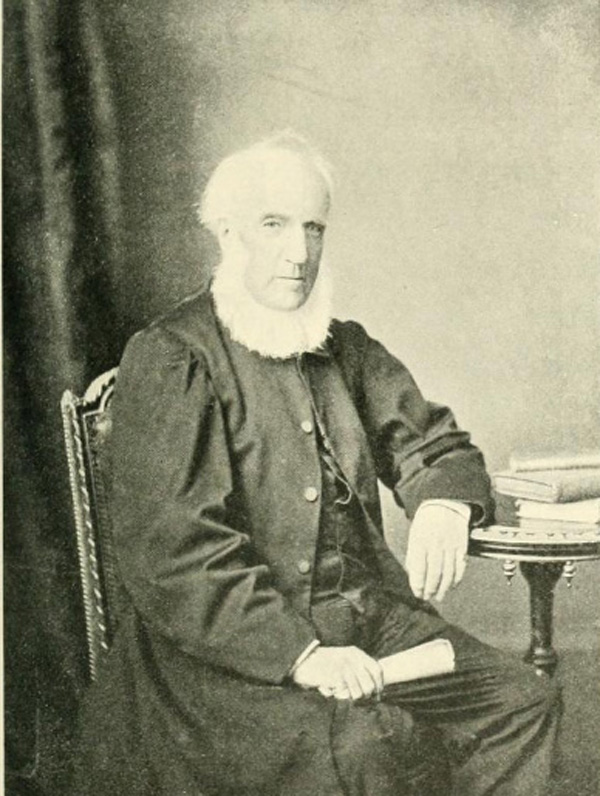
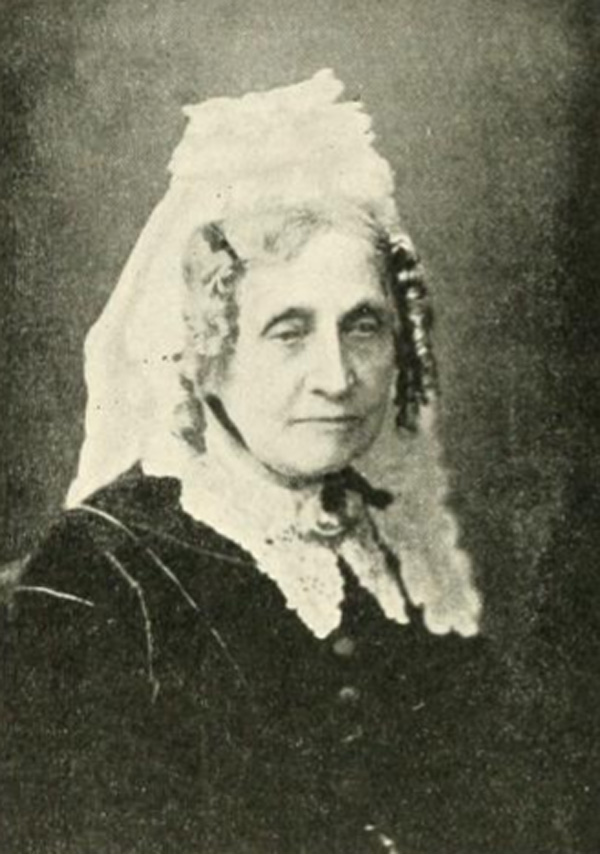
Mr George Allen and Mrs Jane Allen c. 1860

George Allen was born in 1800 in London. His father died when he was only six and his mother remarried. His stepfather, Thomas Collicott, had a business selling medicines. In 1812 he was convicted of not affixing revenue stamps to the medicine bottles and was transported to Australia. The rest of the family including George who was then only 16, followed him to Australia in 1816. George was articled to a solicitor the next year and was a practicing solicitor in 1822. He was the first solicitor to receive his legal training in the colony.

During his training he joined the Wesleyan Church and became very religious. He became Secretary of the Benevolent Society and a member of the Temperance Society. He also had various political roles including Mayor of Sydney between 1844 and 1845 and Member of the NSW Legislative Council from 1856. In 1823 he married Jane Bowden who was the daughter of the schoolteacher Thomas Bowden. Over the years she bore fourteen children of whom five sons and five daughters survived.

In 1829 George commissioned the famous architect, John Verge, to build Toxteth House on 39 hectares (96 acres) that he had acquired in Glebe. The original house built by Verge is shown below. It was a rectangular two-story building with single storey wings. It also had a stone flagged verandah around two sides of the house. The gardens were very elaborate and contained an orchard and even a large private cricket ground. Over the years George Allen built several other houses on the estate including Tranby and Emslee which are shown below in the wide photo of the estate. In 1847 he built a Wesleyan Chapel on the grounds, a shown below. George had a particular interest in horticulture and the grounds surrounding the house contained many different varieties of trees and flowers. In 1845 he entered the Horticultural Show and displayed flowers which included amaranthus, celosia, fuchsia, salvia and amaryllis. He also entered various varieties of apples, pears, figs, passionfruit medlars almonds and capsicum.

In 1877 George Allen died at Toxteth Park and his eldest son George Wigram Allen inherited the property.

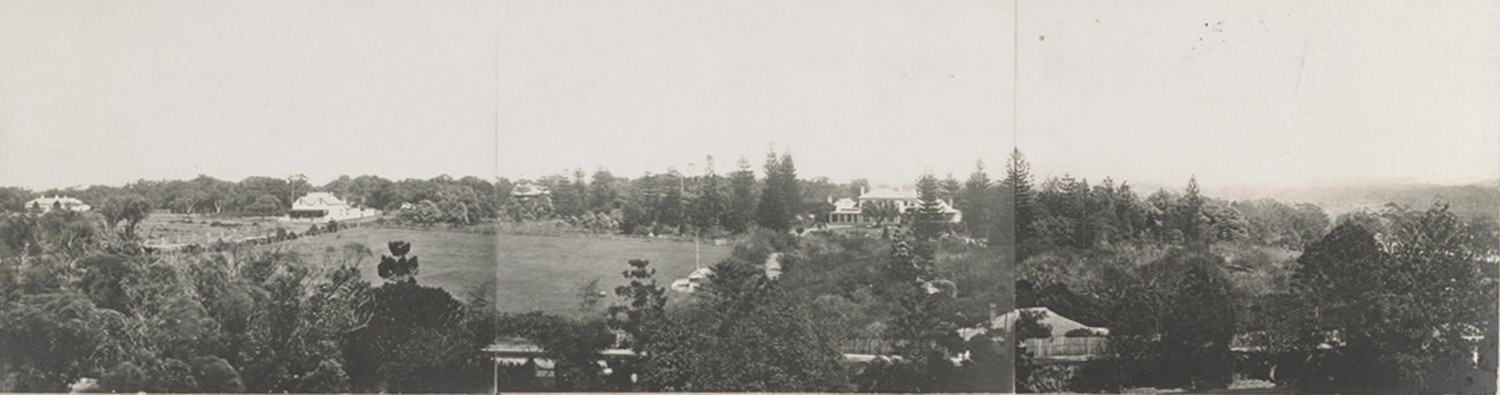
Toxteth Park, c. 1875. The house on the far left is Tranby. The next house is Emslee. Both houses still stand in Mansfield Street, Glebe. The large house to the right of these is Toxteth Park before the alterations were made. The area in the centre of the photo is the private cricket ground.

=== Sir George Wigram Allen and Lady Allen ===
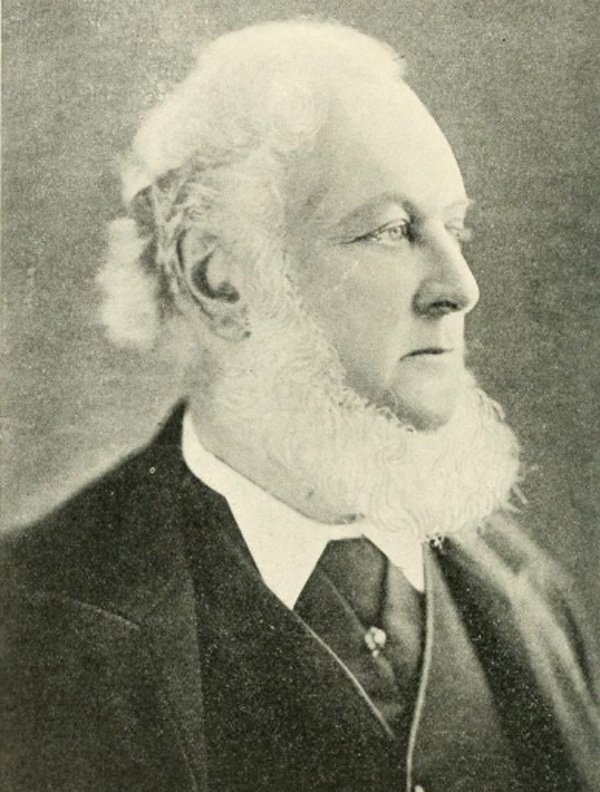
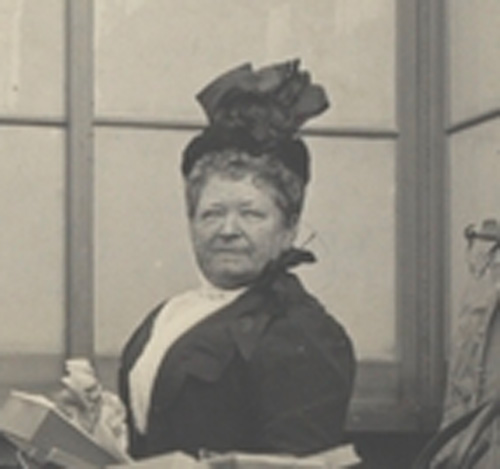
Sir George Wigram Allen c. 1880 and Lady Allen c. 1900

George Wigram Allen was born in 1824 in Sydney. He was articled to his father as a solicitor in 1841 and six years later went into partnership with him. In 1851 he married Marian Clapham Boyce whose father was the Reverend William Binnington Boyce, a Wesleyan minister. The wedding took place in Toxteth Park Chapel. The couple lived at Strathmore which was adjacent to Toxteth Park and it was from here that the panorama photo of Glebe (see above) was taken. Over the years they had eleven children. George had a very distinguished career. As well as being a lawyer he was Mayor of Glebe for some time and later entered the NSW Legislative Assembly and became Minister of Justice and Public Instruction. He was also elected Speaker of the Assembly in 1875. In 1877 he received a knighthood for his services as Speaker, and appointed KCMG in 1884.

The substantial home on the estate included a large library that housed a huge collection of books amassed by Allen.

When George's father died in 1877 he inherited Toxteth Park but did not move to the property until 1881 because he wanted major alterations made to the building. Under the supervision of the architect George Arthur Mansfield he added a third storey, a tower and a ballroom.

From the early 1880s some of the land around Toxteth Park was sold by George and free standing villas were erected. After George died in 1885 major subdivisions of the Estate were made over the next decade. Lady Allen remained at Toxteth house after her husband's death until about 1900 and then moved to Banksia in Woollahra. Before she left her son Arthur took many photos of the house and grounds some of which are shown below. In 1901 she sold the property to the Sisters of the Good Samaritan.

Library at Toxteth Park c. 1890	The Chapel at Toxteth Park built by George Allen c. 1900. Demolished in 1903 for the new Wesleyan Church.	Toxteth Park stables and carriage house c. 1890

=== Sisters of the Good Samaritan ===
St Scholastica's was originally located in Pitt Street Sydney. It was opened as a high school by the Sisters of the Good Samaritan in 1878. However, in 1899 the Government decided to build Central Railway Station and several properties including the school owned by the Good Samaritan Sisters were resumed and demolished. Toxteth Park was purchased and the school was relocated to Glebe. The gates of the School in Pitt Street were brought to the new premises and are still used today. A photo of the original school in Pitt Street showing the gates as they were in 1875 is below. A magnification of the gates on the left of the building is also given.

Sisters of the Good Samaritan School in Pitt Street c. 1880 before it was demolished to make way for Central railway station. The gates can be seen on the left of the building and also further down on the right.	A magnification of the gates on the left of the building

== See also ==
- Australian residential architectural styles
