= Iona, Darlinghurst =

Australian heritage-listed residence

Iona
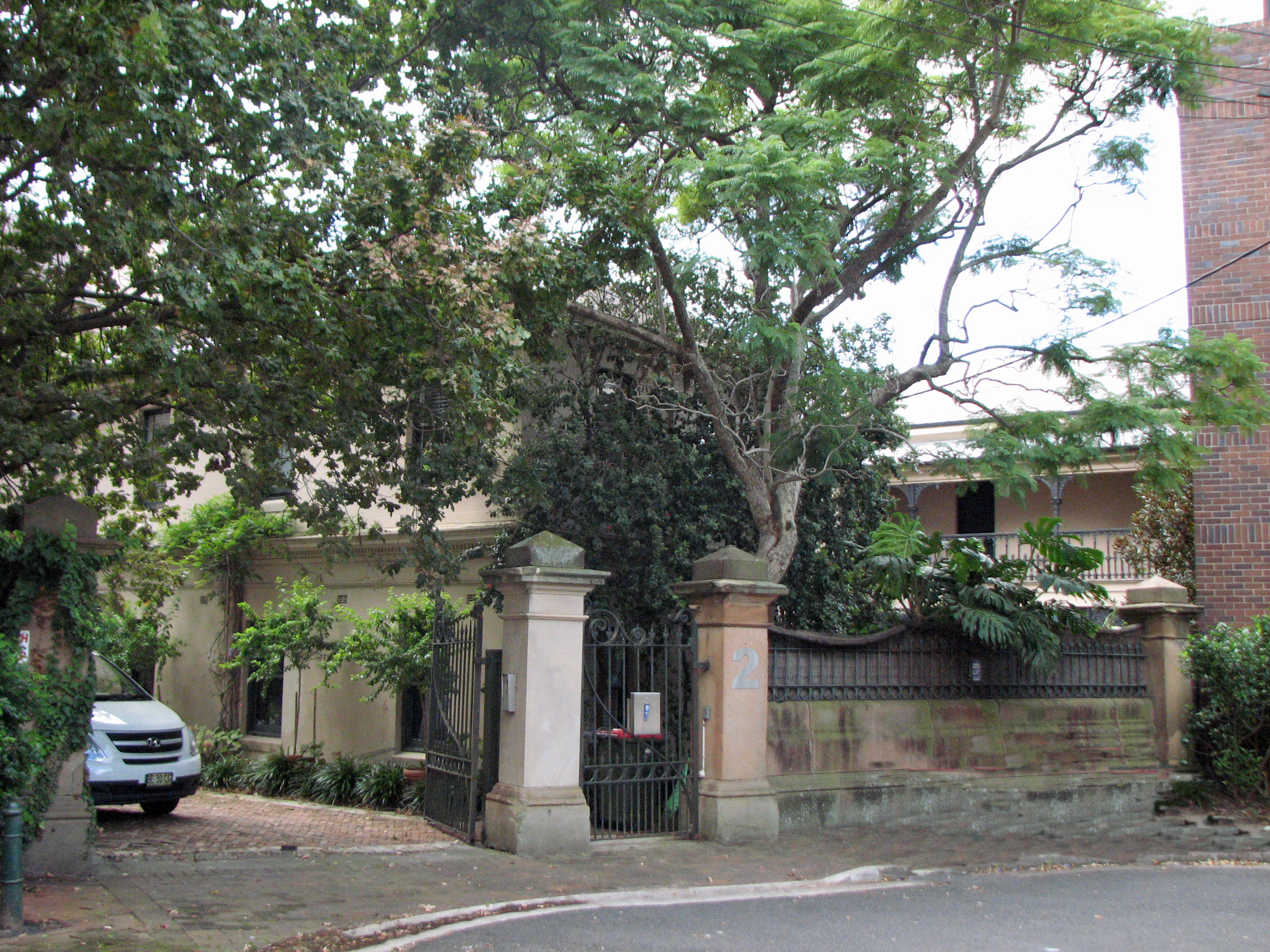
- Iona, 2 Darley Street, Darlinghurst, NSW

- Location within Sydney Location within Australia
- 33.8773°S 151.2200°E
- Location: 2 Darley Street, Darlinghurst, City of Sydney, New South Wales, Australia

History
- Built: 1880–1888

Site notes
- Architectural style: Victorian Italianate

New South Wales Heritage Register
- Official name: Iona; Iona Cottage; Wootton; Wootton/Winchester/Hughlings Private Hospital
- Type: State heritage (built)
- Designated: 2 April 1999
- Reference no.: 176
- Type: Mansion
- Category: Residential buildings (private)

Iona is a heritage-listed residence and former private hospital located at 2 Darley Street in the inner city Sydney suburb of Darlinghurst, New South Wales, Australia. It was built from 1880 to 1888. It is also known as Iona Cottage, while the private hospital was variously known as Wootton, Winchester and Hughlings. It was added to the New South Wales State Heritage Register on 2 April 1999.

== History ==
Darlinghurst: With its elevated position over the city, the area has been called Woolloomooloo Heights, Eastern Hill and Henrietta Town. In the 1820s, Governor Ralph Darling renamed the suburb in honour of his wife, Eliza Darling.

By 1800 several large windmills were situated on the heights of this area, using its stiff breezes to grind much-needed flour from grain. The area began its suburban life under the name "Henrietta Town", being called after Mrs Macquarie, whose second name was Henrietta. At that time it was an Aboriginal reserve. Loyalties changed with Governors when Darling took office, changing its name to Darlinghurst in honour of his popular wife. "Hurst" is an old English word for a wooded hill.

=== Iona Cottage ===
Iona is on land which was once part of a grant of just over five acres to William Long in August 1835. James Wright leased the land from Long in early 1836 and when the land was subdivided in 1845, part of it was purchased by Elizabeth Grose. Mrs Grose's property was one of several in the very fashionable Darlinghurst Heights.

From 1866 until 1869 Mrs Grose's house was occupied by Richard Jones and from 1872 the occupant of the house was Robert Carter. That year was also the first listing of the name of the house - "Iona Cottage". Mrs Grose sold her property in 1879 and the land was subdivided into 9 lots.

Robert Carter extended the house, replaced the shingled roof with iron and continued to live at Iona Cottage until 1884. At the time he financed the sale, Iona was described as a five bedroom gentleman's residence.

=== Second and current Iona (1888) ===
Edward Chisholm, a wealthy Sydney merchant and pastoralist, purchased the property in October 1888. Edward built a new home on the site, also called "Iona". Chisholm and his family resided in the house until his death in 1898, and the property was transmitted to the Perpetual Trustee Company.

In 1906 the name of the street was changed to Darley Street, possibly named after Sir Frederick Matthew Darley who at that time was the Chief Justice of New South Wales and Lieutenant-Governor of New South Wales. The site became known as 2 Darley Street.

Adela Taylor, the wife of Sir Allen Taylor, purchased the property in March 1908 and renamed the house "Wootton". Allen Taylor founded his firm of timber growers, merchants and sawmill proprietors. He was at one time Lord Mayor of Sydney. Taylor Square is named after him.

=== Private hospital ===
From 1912 to 1977, Iona/Wootton operated as a private hospital, variously known as Wootton Private Hospital (1912-1949), Winchester Private Hospital (1949-1968), Hughlings Private Hospital (1968-1977). The Taylors sold the property in December 1912 to Eliza Hyem, wife of Alexander Hyem. Mrs Hyem leased the site to Jessie Robertson, Elizabeth Robertson and Annie Ellie McAndrew, spinsters, who converted the house to "Wootten Private Hospital", a psychiatric facility. Jessie Robertson became the owner of the property in 1918. Before 1919 an operating theatre block was added on the southern side of the house. Jessie leased the hospital to Florence Inglis, Elizabeth Fraser and Annie Paton, spinsters and nurses, in February 1920. They then purchased the property in June 1927.

In 1935 an additional two-storey wing was built next to the operating theatre. In 1936 there were some minor alterations and additions to the 1935 rear wing and a seven bedroom nurses' residence was built in the grounds to the north of the house. In 1939 the hospital had 27 bedrooms. The hospital was purchased in early 1948 by Lillian Ross West, the Matron, who lived at Randwick, and it was then purchased by Winchester Hospital in 1949 and they operated "Winchester Private Hospital" on the site. Hugo Holdings purchased the site in 1968 and operated "Hughlings Private Hospital" until 1977. Major alterations were made in 1969, including the enclosure of the verandahs, and the modification of most internal and external doors to comply with Board of Health requirements.

Many mansions were demolished in Darlinghurst between 1920 and 1940 and replaced by terraced houses and flats. The use of Iona as a hospital saved it from this fate. In 1973 the site was purchased by developers, Cascais, Westport Holdings and Inciti Developments, who also purchased many surrounding houses. They sought approval for three 60 storey tower block home units in the area. Consent was granted in May 1977 which included a lesser scale development and the conversion of Iona into 13 strata units. The developers suffered financial problems and each property was sold to individual owners. The National Trust of Australia was against the loss of Iona and the property development of the area and in 1976 the National Trust classified Iona as part of the Darley Street Group. The Darley Street Group was also listed on the Register of the National Estate.

=== Iona, post-1979 ===
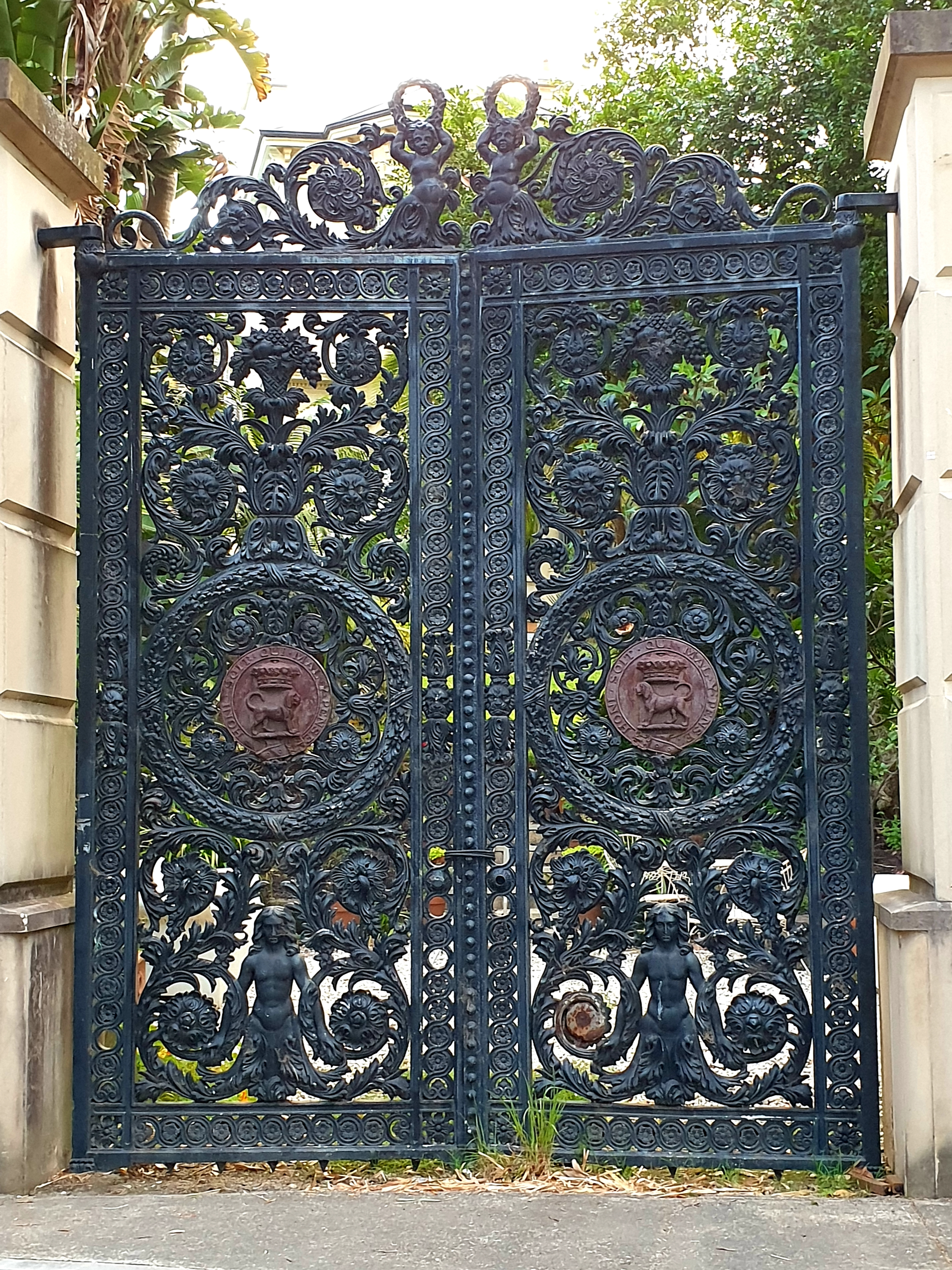
The gates at the Tewkesbury Avenue entrance

The subject site was purchased from Home Units of Australia by Jesseme P/L in December 1979. The company was owned by John Rutherford who renamed the building Iona, and he asked his architect to prepare plans for the conversion of the building into 15 flats. John and Gae Rutherford then lived there. The proposal did not proceed, and in October 1980 South Sydney Council approved an application for restoration of the building as a single dwelling. Rutherford applied to the Heritage Council for funding assistance for restoration works and $20,000 was granted. Rutherford himself became owner in 1983 and continued restoration. At this time the house was rewired, replumbed and reguttered and unsympathetic additions and alterations were removed (e.g. enclosed verandahs). To enhance the setting, the former nurses' quarters building north of the house was demolished in 1984.

New entrance gates and pillars in the northern boundary fence were added around 1992 (to Tewkesbury Avenue). Each gate includes a heraldic badge charged with a talbot statant and the coronet of a marquess in chief, encircled with a garter inscribed with the motto "honi soit qui mal y pense"—the emblem of The Most Noble Order of the Garter.

Two c. 1990 photographs show excavation works to create a new garden in the north-east corner of the yard off Tewkesbury Avenue, and at the northern elevation of Iona excavation and planting of an advanced palm tree, Washingtonia robusta. In the early 1990s the rear yard (eastern side)was excavated to establish a new garden which included relocation of palm trees.

Iona was sold to the Gowrie-Smith family in 1994 after three years of marketing in which prospective buyers planning a boutique hotel use dropped out. Film makers Baz Luhrmann and Catherine Martin leased Iona from 1997. The site was sold to Samboroo P/L in June 1999. In 1999 when the buildings to its east were demolished, a portion of the rear of lots 2 and 6 were consolidated with Iona.

In February 2006, Jan Gowrie-Smith, the former wife of entrepreneur Ian Gowrie-Smith, sold Iona for $10m to Luhrmann and Martin, who used it as a dwelling and workplace. Urgent plumbing repair works were undertaken east of the house following flooding of sewage in the basement of the original section of the house in December 2009. Luhrmann and Martin extensively renovated Iona with her designer wallpaper and finishes, retaining its original flooring, tessellated tile entry, ornate plaster ceiling details throughout and fireplaces. The couple added a lap swimming pool in more recent years.

Luhrmann and Martin unsuccessfully advertised the property for sale in 2013 but put it back on the market in July 2015 after relocating to New York. The property was sold in early 2016 to a Sydney buyer, for c. $16m. The new buyers are Tim Eustace and partner Salvatore Panui, who had bought Lyndhurst in Glebe in 2005, did further restoration of that house and sold it in 2016.

== Description ==
=== Residence ===
Iona is a 22-room house, freestanding, one of a handful of such mansions left in Darlinghurst.

The existing dwelling is located towards the southern end of the site. A two-storey, with basement, late Victorian villa known as Iona. It is constructed of rendered brick with a slate roof, two storey verandah and has been altered and added to a number of times. The dwelling was constructed around 1888 and replaced an earlier single storey timber cottage called Iona on the site.

In the early 20th century the dwelling was converted for use as a private hospital. The hospital use continued through to 1977, and numerous alternations and additions were undertaken as part of this use. In the 1970s the site and a number of surrounding sites were acquired for redevelopment with Iona retained. The development never proceeded and the place was restored in the 1980s with a proposal to convert it to a boutique hotel, which did not proceed.

=== Garden ===
Iona today is on a lot of 2,700 square metres. It retains a remnant garden of reduced area on the western side of the house, bounded in the south by tall gates to Darley Street and a tall fence to Tewkesbury Avenue in the north.

The site is irregular in shape and is located at the end of Darley Street with a second frontage to Tewkesbury Avenue; towards which the principal elevation or northern facade is oriented. The site is oriented north south with the east and west boundaries adjoining the neighbouring properties. The existing dwelling is located towards the southern end of the site. The site is bounded by a high sandstone fence. The main entry is through cast iron palisade gates from Darley Street with a second access point from Tewkesbury Avenue on the boundary through recently constructed large solid iron gates. The northern and western portions of the site are not built upon and feature the grassed front yard and paved circular driveway respectively.

The front yard features large mature trees along the boundaries and is predominantly grassed with some garden beds and some low sandstone walling around the edges. A grotto style garden with sandstone walls and a circular centre feature is located in the north eastern corner of the site. Between the rear southern elevation of the dwelling and the boundary fence is a recently landscaped yard featuring stone paving, garden beds and a fountain. A large Moreton Bay fig (Ficus macrophylla) in the garden overhands the Tewkesbury Avenue boundary wall.

=== Modifications and dates ===
- pre-1888: early single storey cottage, also called Iona
- c. 1888: current house built. It replaced the earlier cottage.
- early 20th century: dwelling was converted for use as a private hospital. This use continued through to 1977, and numerous alternations and additions were undertaken as part of this use.
- 1970s: the site and a number of surrounding sites were acquired for redevelopment with Iona retained. The development never proceeded
- 1980s: the place was restored with a proposal to convert it to a boutique hotel, which did not proceed

== Heritage listing ==
Iona constructed c. 1888 is significant for its high aesthetic quality as a late Victorian Italianate villa demonstrating the transition into Federation period styles of residential architecture. Its form, use of materials and detailing, particularly the highly ornate cornices provide the building with its high aesthetic value with such cornices being relatively rare due to their excellent quality. Iona is associated with prominent businessmen and public figures of the time. Historically the place was also adapted for use as a private hospital for many years. The original dwelling is largely intact although much of the original detailing and joinery has been reconstructed following its institutional use.

Iona was listed on the New South Wales State Heritage Register on 2 April 1999.
