= Sarah Octavia Brennan =

Australian Good Samaritan sister (1867–1928)

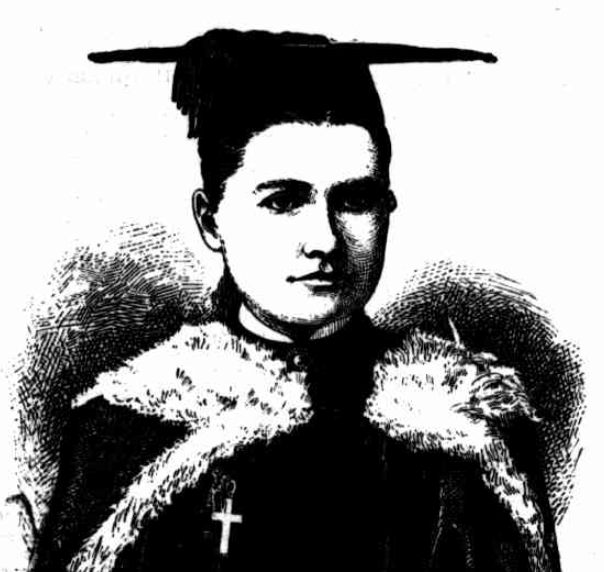
- Sarah Octavia BRENNAN, B.A. in 1889
- Born: 14 April 1867; Moruya
- Died: 8 January 1928 (aged 60); Lewisham
- Education: University of Sydney
- Occupation: teacher
- Known for: Sister of the Good Samaritan
- Parent: Martin Brennan

Sarah Octavia Brennan became Sister Mary Elizabeth (14 April 1867 – 8 January 1928) was an Australian Good Samaritan Sister and teacher.

== Life ==
Brennan was born in 1867 on the Australian coast at Moruya. Her parents were Elizabeth (born McKeon) and Martin Brennan were both Irish immigrants in 1859. Her father was in the police and he was one of the guards looking after the transportation of gold. He and Elizabeth had only one child and that was Sarah Olivia. She went to boarding school with the Sisters of the Good Samaritan in QueanBeyan when she was twelve. When Brennan became a student at the University of Sydney, her father was very involved. He could not go to the lectures but he followed the course and they matriculated together in 1887. Sarah went on to take her first degree in 1889 in Roman history, Latin, and French and two years later she passed her masters in history and philology with her father still following her studies. After a gap, she went again to the university and between 1894 and 1897 she took a BSc. She was an early woman science graduate as the first Australian woman to receive a science degree was Fanny Hunt in 1888. Her mother died in Sydney in 1897.

She was a member of the Naturalists Society of New South Wales and she wrote a paper on her dissections of the Australian earthworm that was read to the Linnean Society in 1900 .

Brennan was involved as a teacher in improving the teaching of Science at Saint Scholastica's College in Sydney She taught both Latin and Science and she taught teachers. In 1920, she and four others became Sisters, she took the name Sister Mary Elizabeth.

Brennan died in 1928 in Lewisham.
