= Sisters of the Good Samaritan =

Roman Catholic congregation of religious women

The Congregation of the Sisters of the Good Samaritan, colloquially known as the "Good Sams", is a Roman Catholic congregation of religious women commenced by Bede Polding, OSB, Australia’s first Catholic bishop, in Sydney in 1857. The congregation was the first religious congregation to be founded in Australia. The sisters form an apostolic institute that follows the Rule of Saint Benedict. They take their name from the well-known gospel parable of the Good Samaritan.

== History ==
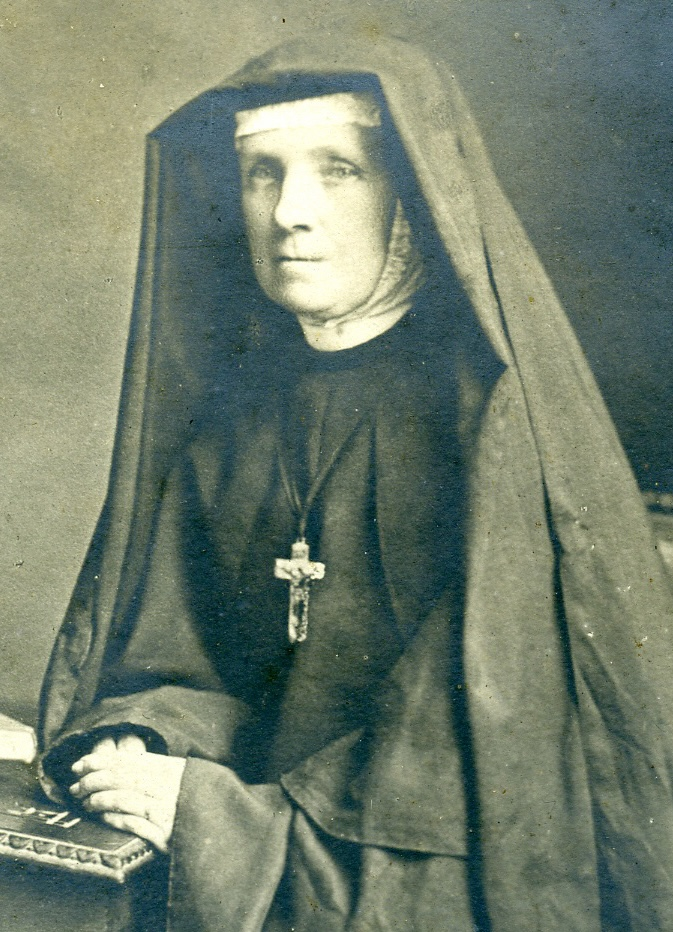
Co-founder Geraldine Scholastica Gibbons

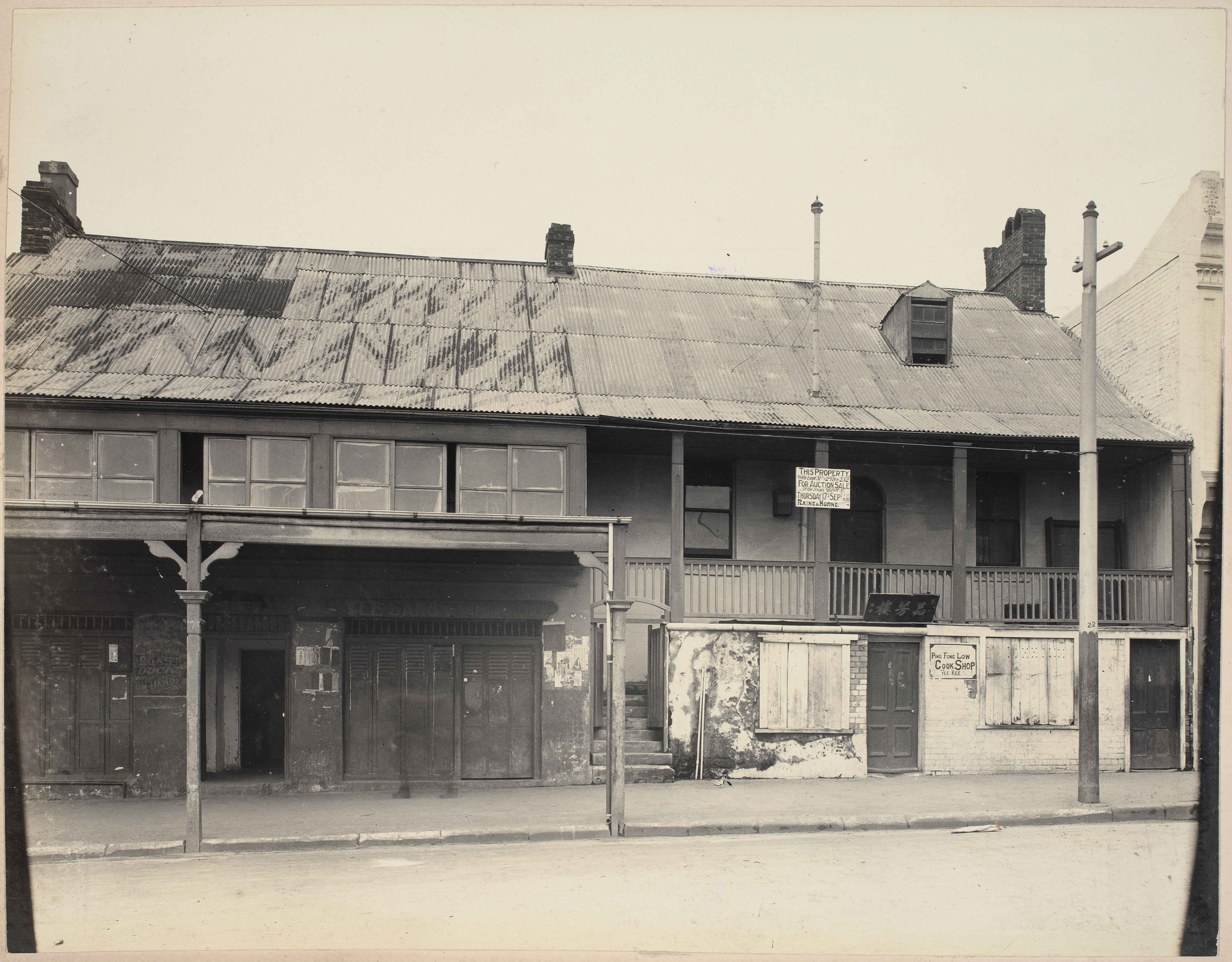
The House of the Good Shepherd on Campbell Street in Sydney, c. 1908

Under the guidance of Polding’s co-founder, Mother Scholastica Gibbons, a Sister of Charity, the sisters cared for needy, homeless women at a refuge, the House of the Good Shepherd in Sydney, and orphans at the Roman Catholic Orphan School, a government institution at Parramatta. Foundations were made throughout Sydney and New South Wales as bishops urgently requested staff for Catholic schools. The first foundation outside New South Wales was made at Port Pirie, South Australia, in 1890. Under the leadership of Mother Berchmans, who was superior general from 1898 to 1916, the order expanded greatly, from nineteen communities to thirty nine, with expansion into four additional states. She added new congregations to serve the poor in urban areas like Brisbane and Melbourne, and set up missions in rural areas, such as the outback of Queensland and in farming communities in Victoria. Over time, sisters have served in all states and territories of Australia.

During the first 100 years, education was a major focus of the sisters’ work. The work of the women’s refuge changed after World War I, when young women were referred from the Children’s Court to the care of the sisters at St Magdalen’s Arncliffe.

Sister Mary Elizabeth was involved as a teacher in improving the teaching of Science at Saint Scholastica's College in Sydney and in 1920 she joined the sisters. A new ministry began in 1957 when Mater Dei Special School, Narellan opened at the request of the New South Wales bishops to provide a Catholic education for students with special needs.

Throughout the 1960s and 1970s, the sisters responded to the call of the Second Vatican Council to embrace the charism of their founder. They diversified their ministries to include catechetics, parish work, and support for Indigenous people, the elderly, the homeless, prisoners and people with disabilities. They also shared their rich Benedictine spirituality by giving retreats and spiritual direction. During this era, the education of students in the Good Samaritan schools and colleges became a shared ministry with lay people.

Increasingly, the congregation was called to listen to the needs of the wider Asia-Pacific region. Sisters went to Japan in 1948, in response to an appeal for help from the Bishop of Nagasaki. Initially, they established a dispensary to care for victims of the 1945 atomic bomb, but later went on to open a secondary school and kindergarten.

In a spirit of reconciliation with their Asian neighbours, the Good Samaritan Japanese sisters desired to begin a community in the Philippines. The community established in Bacolod in 1990, provides a kindergarten school for the children of the very poor. In 1991, the sisters began to work in Kiribati at the request of the local bishop and founded communities and a preschool centre.

In Australia, in 2011, the sisters’ ministry in Catholic education comprised ten schools in five dioceses: the Archdioceses of Brisbane, Melbourne and Sydney and the Dioceses of Broken Bay and Wollongong. The Congregation valued these schools as a sphere of its apostolic activity within the mission of the Church. In reading the signs of the times as they relate to the Good Samaritan Sisters and their schools, the congregation discerned that 2011 was the appropriate time to embrace a new and different future.

In 2011, the Sisters of the Good Samaritan received approval to establish Good Samaritan Education, a new entity within the Australian Catholic Church to oversee the canonical governance of the Congregation’s schools.

Today, about 235 Good Samaritan Sisters live and minister throughout Australia and in Japan, the Philippines and Kiribati. They and the wider Good Samaritan family continue to seek God and to live out the injunction of the Good Samaritan parable to be a good neighbour to those in need.

== Sisters of the Good Samaritan ==
- Geraldine Scholastica Gibbons
- Clara Jane McLaughlin (Mother Berchmans)
- Bernice Moore
- Linda Cassell
- Sarah Octavia Brennan
- Patty Fawkner

== Schools established and/or run by the Sisters of the Good Samaritan ==
=== Australia ===
New South Wales

- Mater Dei School, Cobbitty (special school)
- Mater Maria Catholic College, Warriewood, Sydney
- Mount St Benedict College, Pennant Hills, Sydney
- Rosebank College, Five Dock, Sydney
- St Mary Star of the Sea College, Wollongong
- St Brigid's Catholic Primary School, Gwynneville
- St Patrick's College, Campbelltown, Sydney
- St Scholastica's College, Glebe Point, Sydney
- Stella Maris College, Manly, Sydney

Queensland

- Lourdes Hill College, Hawthorne, Brisbane
- St Margaret Mary's College, Hyde Park, Townsville
- St Thomas' School, Camp Hill
- St Mary's College and St Columba's School, Charters Towers (amalgamated into Columba Catholic College)

South Australia

- Marymount College, Adelaide

Victoria

- Mater Christi College, Belgrave, Melbourne
- Santa Maria College, Northcote, Melbourne

== See also ==
- Wivenhoe, Narellan
