= Saint Scholastica's College, Sydney =

Saint Scholastica's College, Australia

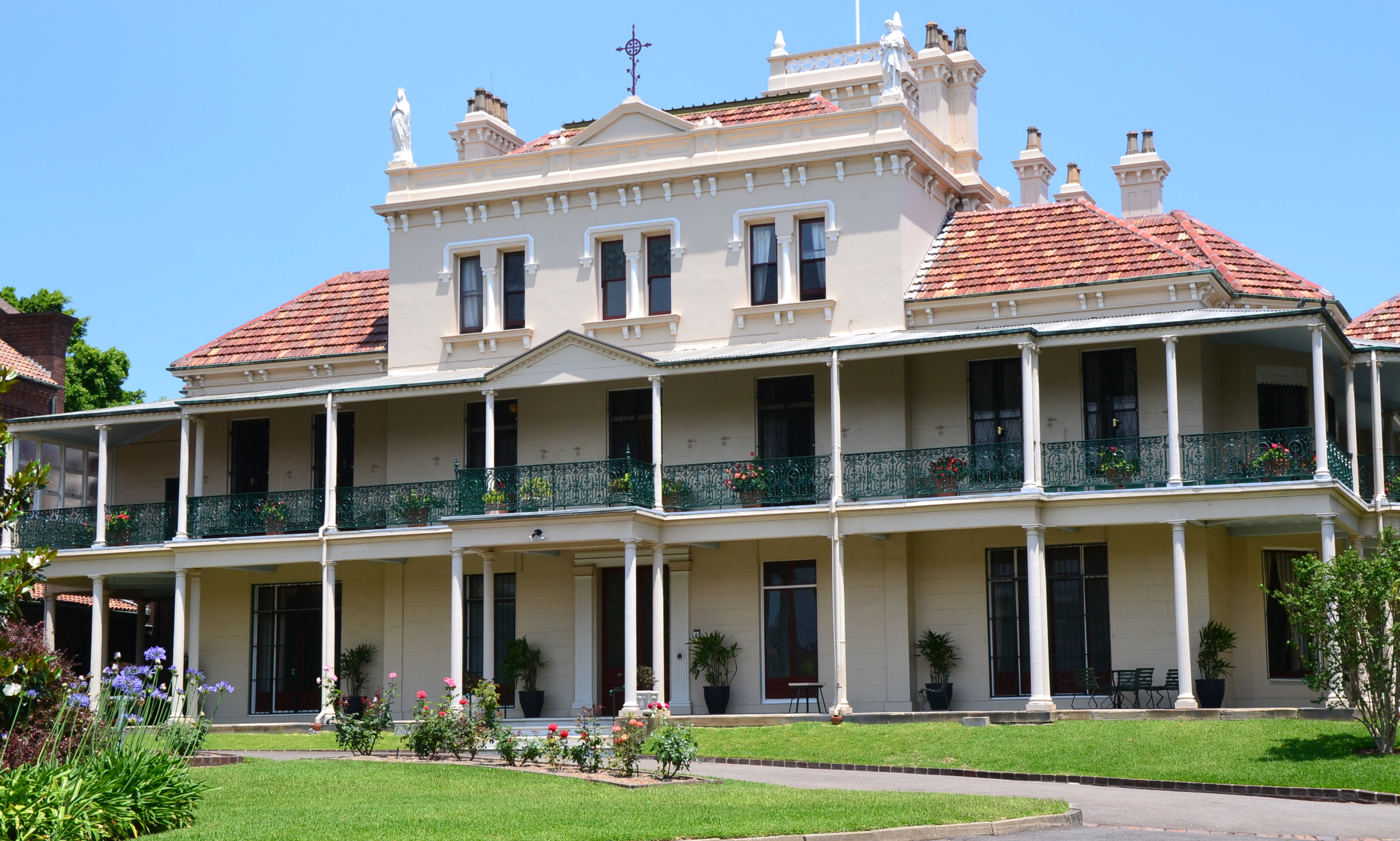
- The John Verge-designed Toxteth Park now forms part of St Scholastica's College, pictured in 2011

Location
- Glebe Point, Sydney, New South Wales; Australia; 33°52′34″S 151°10′48″E

Information
- Type: Independent single-sex secondary day and boarding school
- Motto: Latin: Pax (Peace)
- Religious affiliations: Sisters of the Good Samaritan; Archdiocese of Sydney
- Denomination: Roman Catholic
- Patron saint: Saint Scholastica
- Established: 1878; 148 years ago
- Educational authority: New South Wales Department of Education
- Principal: Laetitia Richmond
- Assistant Principals: Dr Petschler; Mrs Taborda
- Staff: ~106
- Grades: 7–12
- Gender: Girls
- Enrolment: c. 1,043 (2025)
- Campus type: Suburban
- Colours: Blue and white
- Nickname: Schols
- Affiliation: Australian Boarding Schools' Association
- Website: www.scholastica.nsw.edu.au

St Scholastica's College (commonly referred to as Schols) is an independent Roman Catholic single-sex secondary day and boarding school for girls, located in Glebe Point, in Sydney, New South Wales, Australia.

Established in 1878 by the Sisters of the Good Samaritan, the College provides education for girls from the Sydney region, and as of 2019 had approximately 1,030 students from Year 7 to Year 12, including 80 boarders from international, remote and urban areas. St Scholastica's is located within the Archdiocese of Sydney and is affiliated with the Australian Boarding Schools' Association (ABSA).

== Sporting ==
The College sports program includes touch football, AFL, volleyball, rowing, tennis, soccer, netball and dragon boating. They participate in the Catholic Girls Schools Secondary Sports Association (CGSSSA) competitions and in local competitions on weekends.

== Notable staff ==
Sister Mary Elizabeth was involved as a teacher in improving the teaching of Science at the college and in 1920 she joined the sisters.

== Notable alumni ==
- Basia A'Hern – actress
- Jennifer Anne Alexander – Chief Executive Officer of the Australian Institute of Management, New South Wales and the Australian Capital Territory; Chairman of Gondwana Voices (also attended Rosebank College)
- Mabel Eileen Furley OBE – Member of the NSW Legislative Council (1962–1964); Foundation member of the Liberal Party; Chairman of the Federal Women's Committee of the Liberal Party of Australia
- Malarndirri (Barbara) McCarthy – an Australian politician who represented Arnhem in the Northern Territory Legislative Assembly from 2005 to 2012. Senator for the Northern Territory from 2016. School captain in 1988.
- Yvonne Weldon, Australian local government politician, first Aboriginal councillor elected in the City of Sydney.

== See also ==
- List of Catholic schools in New South Wales
- Catholic education in Australia
- List of boarding schools in Australia
- Toxteth Park, Glebe
