= Rockwall, Potts Point =

Rockwall
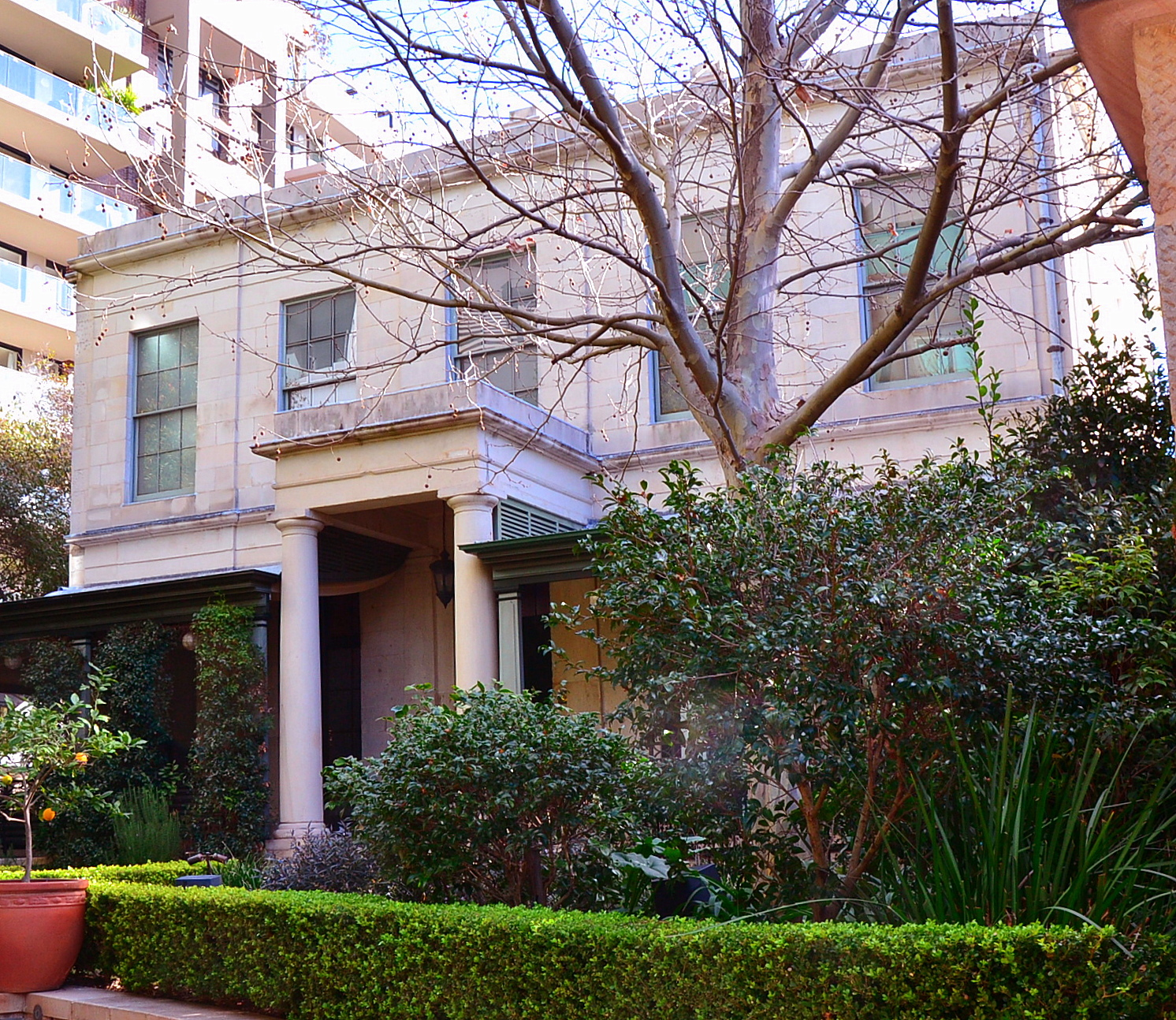

- Location within Sydney Location within Australia
- 33.8699°S 151.2246°E
- Location: 7 Rockwall Crescent, Potts Point, City of Sydney, New South Wales, Australia

History
- Built: 1831–1837

Site notes
- Architect: John Verge
- Architectural style: Colonial Regency

New South Wales Heritage Register
- Official name: Rockwall
- Type: state heritage (built)
- Designated: 2 April 1999
- Reference no.: 20
- Type: Villa
- Category: Residential buildings (private)

Rockwall is a heritage-listed house and former school at 7 Rockwall Crescent in the inner city Sydney suburb of Potts Point in the City of Sydney local government area of New South Wales, Australia. It was designed by John Verge and built from 1831 to 1837. It was added to the New South Wales State Heritage Register on 2 April 1999.

== History ==
=== Darlinghurst Ridge/Woolloomooloo Hill ===
In the 1830s the whole area from Potts Point to Kings Cross and up to Oxford Street was known as Darlinghurst- probably named in honour of Governor Ralph Darling (1824–31)'s wife, Eliza. The rocky ridge that extended inland from Potts Point was called Eastern or Woolloomooloo Hill from the early days of white settlement. The earliest grant of land on Woolloomooloo Hill was made to Judge-Advocate John Wylde in 1822. In 1830 Wylde sold six of his 11 acres on the Point to Joseph Hyde Potts, accountant to the Bank of NSW, after whom Potts Point is named.

By the late 1820s Sydney was a crowded, disorderly and unsanitary town closely settled around the Rocks and Sydney Cove, with a European population of around 12000. Governor Darling was receiving applications from prominent Sydney citizens for better living conditions. The ridge of Woolloomooloo Hill beckoned, offering proximity to town and incomparable views from the Blue Mountains to the heads of Sydney Harbour.

In 1828 Darling ordered the subdivision of Woolloomooloo Hill into suitable "town allotments" for large residences and extensive gardens. He then issued "deeds of grant" to select members of colonial society (in particular, his senior civil servants). The first 7 grants were issued in 1828, with the other allotments formally granted in 1831.

The private residences that were built on the grants were required to meet Darling's so-called "villa conditions" which were possibly determined and overseen by his wife, who had architectural skills. These ensured that only one residence was built on each grant to an approved standard and design, that they were each set within a generous amount of landscaped land and that, in most cases, they faced the town. By the mid-1830s the parade of "white" villas down the spine of Woolloomooloo Hill presented a picturesque sight, and was visible from the harbour and town of Sydney.

=== Rockwall ===
John Busby (1765-1857) was a mineral surveyor and civil engineer. In 1823 he was appointed to manage the colony's coal mines and to find a new supply of fresh water, as the Tank Stream had become too polluted. Busby became famous for overseeing construction of "Busby's Bore" a tunnel which brought fresh water from the Lachlan Swamps (in today's Centennial Park) into the city when the Tank Stream, the city's original water supply, became polluted and inadequate to serve the city's water needs.

Busby received a grant of over 8 acres in 1828. Architect John Verge started plans for Busby's house, Rockwall, and a cottage in 1830. Verge's plans for the house were approved by the Governor the same year.

However, in the early 1830s Busby found himself in financial difficulties, and was forced to sell his grant. From 1835, Verge altered the existing plans for the new owner of Rockwall, Hamilton Collins Sempill, a grazier and merchant. Verge supervised the works for Sempill through to completion in 1837. A c. 1840 painting (artist unknown: Sempill House, Sydney, NSW, State Library) shows it with extensive gardens including a carriage loop, shrubberies and Norfolk Island pines (Araucaria excelsa).

One of the earliest surviving Verge-designed buildings, Rockwall is amongst the few surviving of the once many villas which once dotted Potts Point's "Woolloomooloo Hill".

In the 1920s and 1930s, the original villas and the later grand 19th century residences were demolished to make way for blocks of flats, hotels and later, soaring towers of units. Today only 5 of the original 17 villas still stand, with the lost villas and other grand houses commemorated in the names of the streets of Potts Point, Darlinghurst and Kings Cross. Rockwall is one of these surviving five villas.

According to Verge's ledger, work was commenced on Rockwall prior to 1835. Sempill bought the property in January 1835. Sempill entered into an arrangement with Verge for 'Plans, Specifications and Agreements for altering and completing (the) house at Wooloomooloo (sic late Busby's) and Superintending Works of the same'. Stabling was also to be designed and constructed on the property.

By the time of Sempill's ownership - as depicted in a contemporary watercolour - Rockwall's grounds boasted a circular driveway facing Macleay Street which was balanced on the Sydney (western) side by a circular drive and garden featuring, among other exotic plantings, Norfolk Island pines (Araucaria heterophylla). In Sydney, these trees had become a symbol of vice-regal residences and of harbourside villas and private pleasure grounds. The grounds surrounding Rockwall re-emphasised its strong axis from the front to the back door and thus its design as a villa "in the round". Moreover, in obeying fashionable domain, and external offices for stables and domestic economy'; its respectable distance from the growing town of Sydney; and its pleasurable recreational and even, perhaps, instructive environment, Rockwall was one of the first examples in a long tradition of colonial villa architecture (and landscape design) which reflected changing taste in England during the 1820s.

1836 saw the house pass into the hands of Thomas Urmson Ryder who, it is noted in Verge's ledger, ordered plans and specifications for verandahs for Rockwall and of a garden house for the property. Alterations, additions and repairs "in the completion of (the) premises" were also recorded in Verge's ledger. Heralding the boom in subdivision and sales which was to transform Woolloomooloo Hill in the 1840s, Ryder put Rockwall up for public auction on one half of the original estate on 14 December 1837: the other portion was sold off as "Thirty allotments of Garden and Building Ground", two of which had a cottage on them (one with a detached stable) and another a four-stalled stable of stone and brick.

Rockwall sold at auction in 1837 to Arthur Little whose daughter occupied it until 1872.

By 1843 there was a serious financial crisis in the colony and the Darlinghurst grantees suffered. They pressed for the freedom to subdivide land, and Sydney's first exclusive suburb opened up to investors. From the early 1850s, the Gold Rush boosted the economy, and interest in the land available at Darlinghurst grew. The first subdivisions occurred around the edges of the original grants, with blocks of a size that allowed other grand houses to be built and new streets formed.

In the 1870s, heavy land taxes imposed by the administration of the Premier, Sir Henry Parkes, led to another wave of subdivisions of the original grants. The late 19th century saw the final demise of the grounds surrounding the original villas, and in some cases, the villas themselves.

Rockwall was used as a girls' school, Belmore College (c. 1873-1884) and again as the Ailanthus College for Girls (1904–13). It then returned to use as a private residence.

Dr. Herbert Russell Nolan, an ear nose and throat specialist who performed the first appendicectomy in Australia, purchased the house it in 1914. He commissioned architect William Hardy Wilson in conjunction with the Sydney architects Neave and Berry to prepare an elaborate proposal for Rockwall around 1919-20 but Sydney City Council development application records indicate it was not acted upon.

Subsequent additions and alterations were to destroy or bury many of the house's original qualities. The first documented alterations were done for Ivy M. Corke in 1921. Extensive alterations and additions were made by 1924-5, 1928 and 1936 by the Nurses' Club Ltd., a body which owned Rockwall from 1925-1957.

In 1957 it was converted into the Rockwall Private Hotel and major renovations that year saw construction of a new foyer, replacement en masse of the windows and doors, removal of cedar joinery and fireplaces. Further additions were made in 1960.

Rockwall later became part of the Chevron Hotel, then the Landmark Hotel. By the 1960s it was virtually derelict, but was restored in the 1990s for the adjoining hotel (now Rockwall Apartments).

Rockwall was finally classified by the National Trust of Australia (NSW) on 14 December 1979, 142 years after Ryder put it and its subdivided grounds up for auction. It was made the subject of a permanent conservation order on the same day. Though dilapidated and long-deprived of its subdivided gardenesque setting, it stands as a most significant example of both the pre-Victorian colonial villa and of the translation of European taste into the Antipodes. Its fortunes reflect the process of urbanisation in Sydney and the impact of this process on a specific part of the city's material culture.

Rockwall and a portion of the surrounding land were restored in 1995 by Howard Tanner & Associates for the Mirvac Group as part of the development of the adjacent Landmark Parkroyal Hotel (now the Rockwall Apartments) in Macleay Street and today is privately owned.

Rockwall was bought by antique enthusiast Lilian Barclay and retired lawyer John Rollason in 1999 for $2m. The couple married at the house on 26 April 2008, although its title remained in Barclay's name only.

Stephen Turner, a former non-executive director of Iluka Resources Ltd., and wife Phi Phi purchased the property in March 2014 for $10.175m, the suburb's third-highest house price at the time of sale.

== Description ==
=== House ===
Rockwall is one of the few remaining original grand residences of Potts Point. Architect John Verge started plans for Busby's house, Rockwall and a cottage in 1830. Verge's plans for the house were approved by the Governor the same year. Built 1831-37 as a two-storey Colonial Regency style villa/town house in sandstone blocks with cedar fittings and joinery throughout. From 1835, Verge altered the existing plans for the new owner, Sempill. Verge supervised the works for Sempill through to completion in 1837. Italianate verandahs were added later (LEP). Stuccoed brick construction of five bays with encircling verandah at ground floor, broken by Doric columned porches on the east and west sides. The house is Regency in character.

Built 1831-37 to the designs of Verge with later additions on the south and east side. The oval geometric hall and staircase are similar to Elizabeth Bay House, on a smaller scale. The house today has at least four bedrooms and four bathrooms. Extensive entertaining areas inside and out, including elegant sitting room and grand dining room, both with original marble fireplaces. Lower area with own entrance is a series of sandstone block rooms, with servants' kitchen, bedroom, bathroom, wine cellar and "dungeon". Rumous persist of an underground passage or escape tunnel. Double garage with parking on the grounds also.

=== Grounds ===
The original grant in 1828 was over 3 hectares (8 acres). The gardens once extended to Macleay Street. A c. 1840 painting shows it with extensive gardens including a carriage loop, shrubberies and Norfolk Island pines (Araucaria excelsa).

Darling's so-called "villa conditions" which were possibly determined and overseen by his wife Eliza, who had architectural skills. These ensured that only one residence was built on each grant to an approved standard and design, that they were each set within a generous amount of landscaped land and that, in most cases, they faced the town.

Despite subdivision and encroachment, particularly by two high rise buildings on its immediate eastern and south-eastern boundary, and nearby School complex to its north-west and other terrace housing to its south-west, Rockwall remains amongst the few surviving of the many villas which once dotted Potts Point.

The property now is 1349 square metres of level land, landscaped with manicured gardens including trees along the northern Rockwall Crescent boundary, a lawn to the house's western side, another large Chinese elm tree to the south-west towards Challis Avenue. Rockwall Crescent is a quiet cul-de-sac today.

== Heritage listing ==
Rockwall was listed on the New South Wales State Heritage Register on 2 April 1999 having satisfied the following criteria.

It was considered to be of historical and aesthetic significance and also rare as one of the few surviving early villas of Potts Point, as a fine example of the work of John Verge, architect, and due to association with John Busby of "Busby's Bore" fame.
