= Argo (1806 Chittagong ship) =

Sailing ship wrecked near Tasmania

Coordinates: 42.8805°S 147.3251°E

History

United Kingdom
- Owner: Registered in Calcutta to Payne & Tyrce
- Builder: Built at Chittagong, India
- Launched: 1806
- Fate: Disappeared in 1814 off the coast of Tasmania

General characteristics
- Tons burthen: 137, or 150 (bm)
- Sail plan: Ship-rigged
- Complement: Crew of 32
- Armament: 4 guns

Argo was a merchant ship built in 1806 at Chittagong, present-day Bangladesh. She was registered in Calcutta to Payne & Tyrce. She disappeared in 1814 off the coast of Tasmania after having been "run away with" by convicts.

== Disappearance ==
Argo, Dixon, master, arrived at Port Jackson on 22 December 1813 with merchandise from Île de France. She departed, ostensibly for Île de France, on 14 April 1814.

In 1814 Argo illegally departed Hobart with thirteen or fourteen convicts on board. It was postulated that this was done with the agreement of the master of the ship, John Poor Dixon. At a special commission held on 3 May 1820, the harbour master of Hobart, Captain James Kelly, testified that Argo was never heard of again. It was presumed that she foundered at sea with the loss of all aboard.
