= Strickland House, Vaucluse =

Strickland House
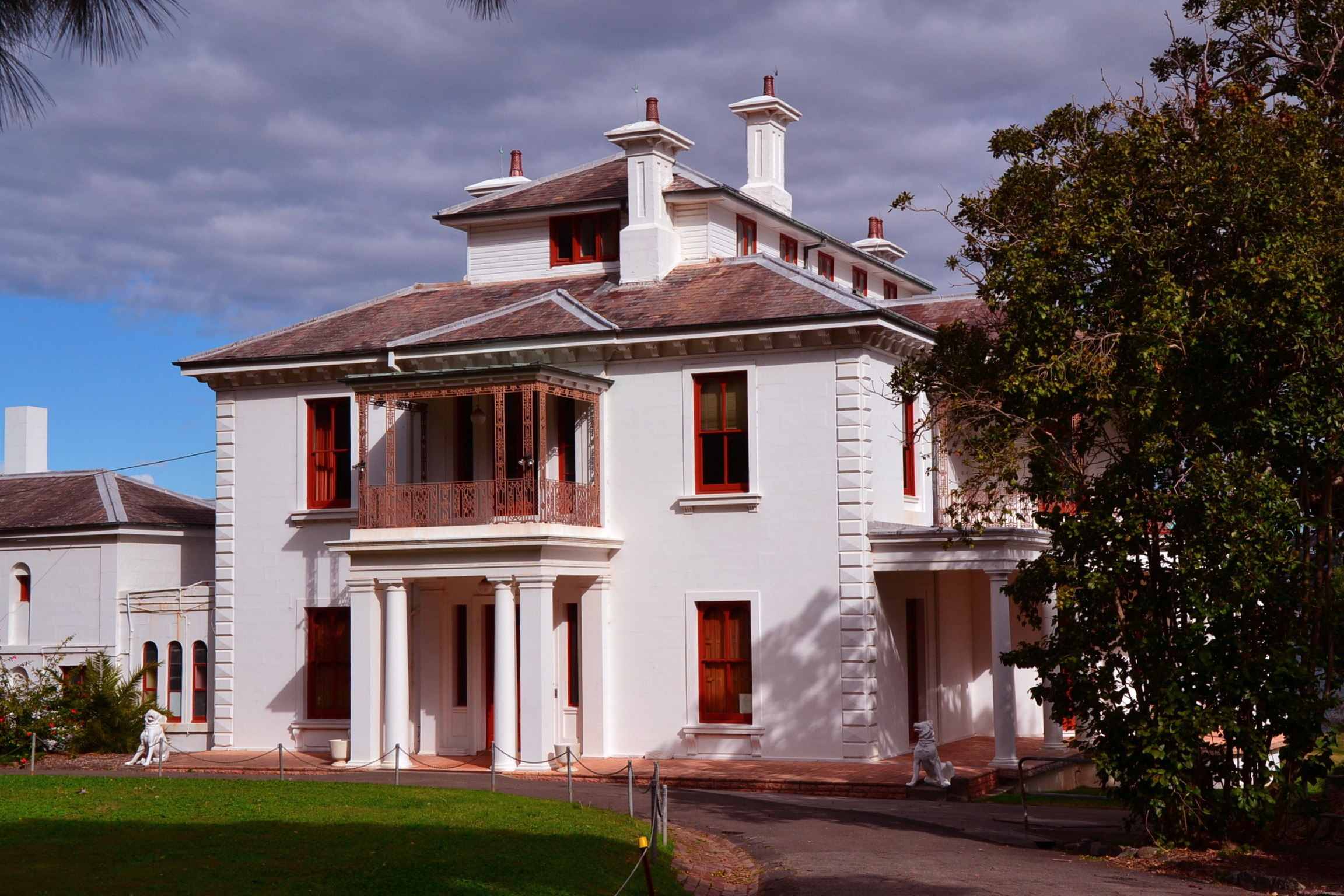
- Strickland House in July 2012

- Location within east Sydney
- 33°51′21″S 151°16′04″E
- Location: 52 Vaucluse Road, Vaucluse, New South Wales, Australia

History
- Built: 1830–1858
- Built for: John Hosking

Site notes
- Architect: John Frederick Hilly
- Architectural styles: Victorian Italianate; Victorian Regency
- Owner: Government of New South Wales

New South Wales Heritage Register
- Official name: Strickland House; Carrara; Strickland Convalescent Home for Women; Strickland House Hospital for the Aged
- Type: State heritage (complex / group)
- Designated: 2 April 1999
- Reference no.: 722
- Type: Mansion
- Category: Residential buildings (private)
- Builders: William Wentworth

Strickland House is a heritage-listed former residence and convalescent home and now functions, film studio, urban park and visitor attraction located at 52 Vaucluse Road, Vaucluse, New South Wales, Australia. It was designed by John Frederick Hilly and built from 1830 to 1858 by William Wentworth. It is also known as Carrara; Strickland Convalescent Home for Women; Strickland House Hospital for the Aged. The property is owned by the Government of New South Wales. It was added to the New South Wales State Heritage Register on 2 April 1999 and on 21 March 1978 was listed on the (now defunct) Register of the National Estate.

== History ==
Strickland House's site has been identified as having twelve phases of historical development from the pre-European occupation of the site; to the first grants made to William Wentworth, who gifted this part of his estate to his daughter, Thomasina, and her husband, Thomas Fisher, in the 1830s–55 (they did not build on it, returning to England); to Charles Lowe, who may have started building the house, but then on-sold the site; to John Hosking, the second Mayor of Sydney (who owned it 1855–76) who built Carrara and lived here; to Henry Moore and his family (1876–88); to Arthur Wigram Allen, tenants and caretakers (1888–1899); Tudor House (1899–1902); to other members of the Allen family (1902–14); and then through a period of ownership and use by the Government of New South Wales / Minister for Lands (1914–15) who bought the site with funds from the Foreshores Resumption Scheme for use as a 'public recreation ground'; for subsequent re-purpose as the Strickland Convalescent Home for Women (1915–33); and then as a Convalescent Hospital for Men and Women (1933–60); and as the Strickland House Hospital for the Aged (1960–90); and finally in its current phase of ownership and use since 1990.

The site demonstrates an important component of the early settlement patterns in the district, being part of an early land grant (originally made to William Charles Wentworth) that has not been subdivided. The site has associations with the historical figures of William Charles Wentworth, the original owner of the (originally much larger) property; John Hosking, who built Carrara and substantially developed the grounds; and subsequent occupants including Henry Moore and members of the Allen family are of significance. The status of these people as leading political figures in the nineteenth century ensured that Carrara was well known within important social circles in Sydney at that time.

=== John Hosking development and ownership ===
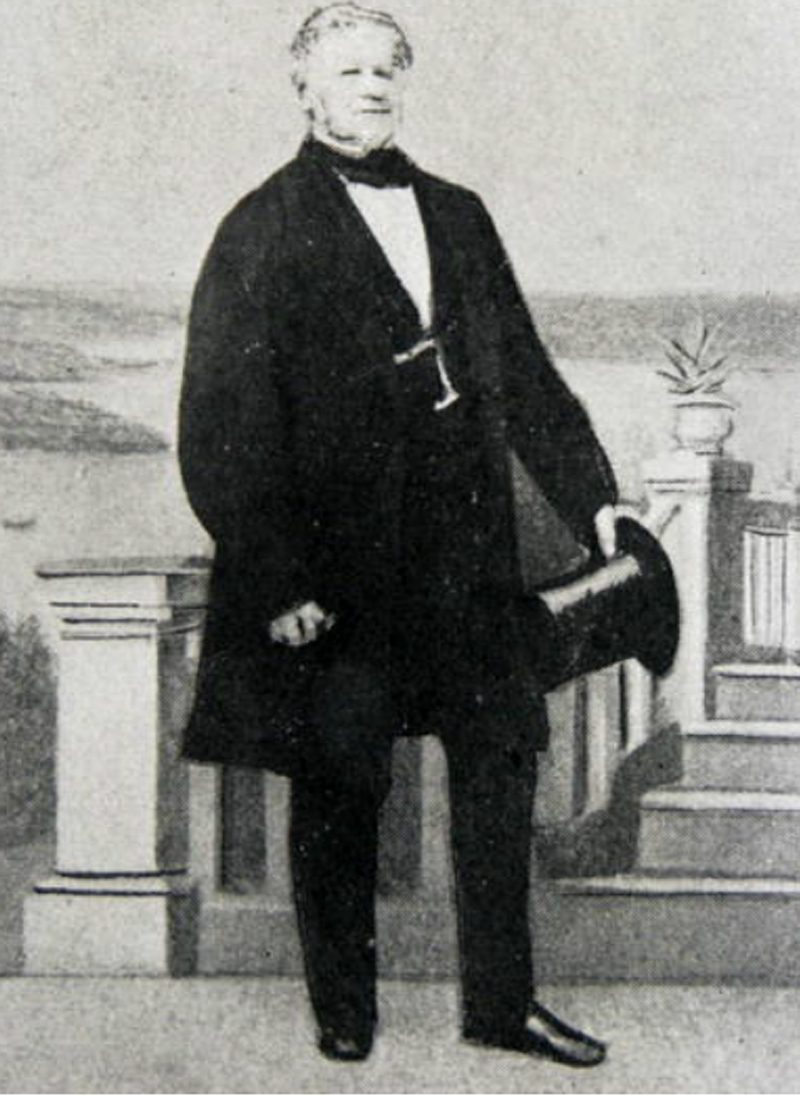
John Hosking 1860

The original villa, Carrara was built in 1856 in a large landscaped setting, including a strong relationship between the house and the water. The two-storey segmental bay projection is striking and represents a relatively early use of such a feature. The remnants of the sandstone wharf adjacent to Milk Beach contributes to the strength of this association.

John Hosking (1806–1882), the Mayor of Sydney, commissioned John Frederick Hilly in 1856 to build Strickland House (then called Carrara). An advertisement was placed in the Sydney Morning Herald on 15 April 1856 for contractors to erect the walls of the house. Hosking was born in 1806 in England. His father was the principal of a day school and was invited in 1809 to come to Sydney to run the Female Orphan School in George Street. He returned to London ten years later when John was 13 years old. When John was 20 he decided to return to Australia with his brother and opened a store in Pitt Street. He went into business with John Terry Hughes who was the nephew of Samuel Terry, an extremely wealthy merchant and landowner. In 1829 he married Terry's daughter, Martha, and the couple had three daughters. The family lived at Strickland House until 1876 and then moved to Penrith to live with one of their daughters.

An advertisement was placed in the newspapers in 1877 which described in detail the house and surrounding gardens of the property. Some of the description is as follows.

The property as a whole can scarcely be equalled in the colonies. Ample accommodation, excellence of designs, and substantial workmanship, combine to produce a home replete with all that is essential to comfort, convenience, and respectability.

=== Henry Moore ownership ===
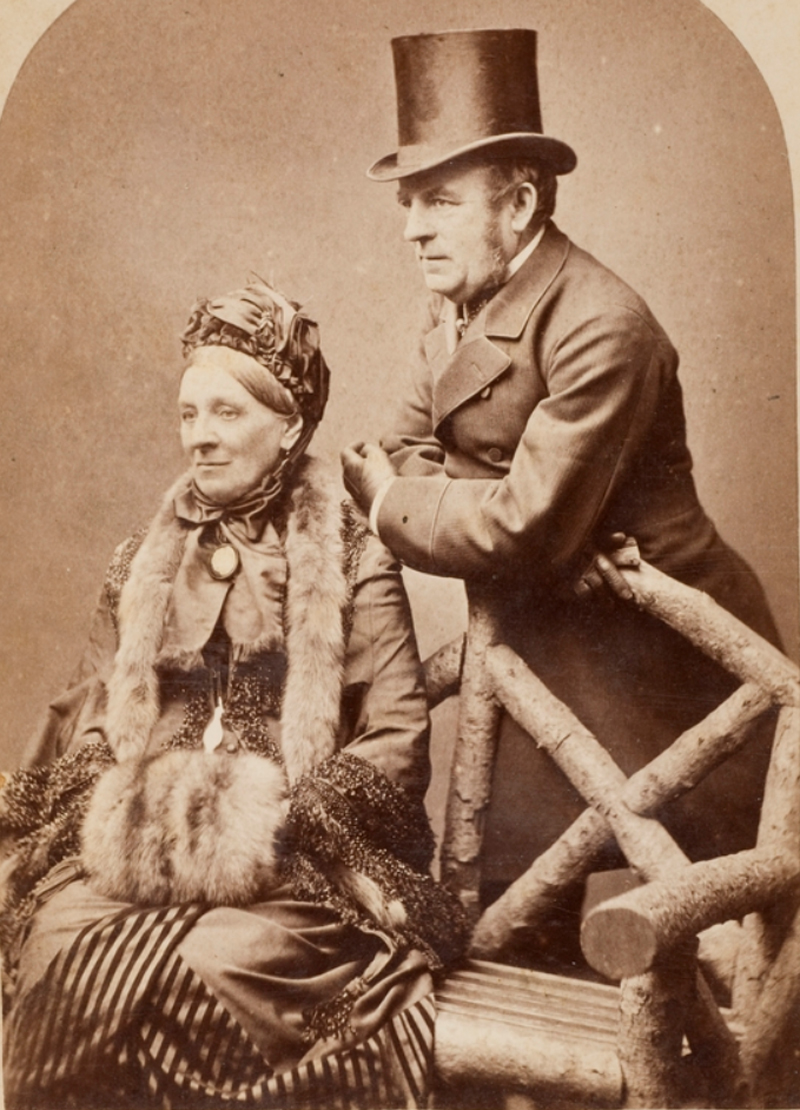
Elizabeth and Henry Moore, c. 1880

Henry Moore (1815–1888) moved into Strickland House in 1879 with his wife, Elizabeth, and seven of his adult children. He was born in London in 1815 and came to Australia as a child with his father, Captain Joseph Moore, who became a merchant. After leaving school he entered his father's firm which was a large importing company. In 1839 he married Elizabeth Scholes Johnson and the couple had nine children – three sons and six daughters. He bought a large wharf at Darling Harbour which was later called Moore's Wharf. He was also an agent for P&O. In 1868 he became a Member of the NSW Parliament and retained this position for almost 20 years.

An account of life at Strickland House and the Moore family in the 1880s was given by one of the housemaids when, in later years, she wrote of her life at the house:

I was quite excited as I walked up to the big white house. Just outside the front door as if they were guarding the house were two enormous carved marble dogs bigger than lions. The large front hall was also of marble. The grounds were beautiful and beautifully kept. There were four gardeners, besides the coachman and the groom and in the house a cook, lady’s maid, two parlour-maids, three house maids, kitchen maid, laundry woman and maid.

Life at the house was very gay. I grew fond of the three young ladies. They entertained a great deal. They were famous for keeping open house.

The Master Mr Moore was a dear old man. He had come out and settled in Australia in the early days. He owned a wharf at Millers Point in Sydney and was reputedly very wealthy, the result of his successful business in whaling ships. He was certainly very generous with his money.

From July 1879 to June 1888 Henry Moore MLC lived at Carrara. He had extensive business in loading and discharging of vessels. About 1840 he bought Moore's Wharf at Millers Point and from 1852 to 1880 was the first P&O shipping agent in Sydney, becoming an MLA in 1868. He married Elizabeth Johnston in 1839 and over 20 years they had 12 children. They moved into Carrara in July 1869 from Barncleuth (later Kinnell), Darlinghurst as that suburb was getting too crowded. Some four years later Moore became owner of Carrara. Their youngest son, Verner, described the Carrara years as "halcyon". They would be invited on board ships anchored in the bay and would return the hospitality. He considered Carrara had a ghost in the giant bamboo, which would crash about in the wind. Mrs Moore died aged 66 in 1885 and in 1888 Henry died, aged 73. After 1888 the family split up, some going to England, some interstate.

=== Ownership under Arthur Allen and Boyce Allen ===
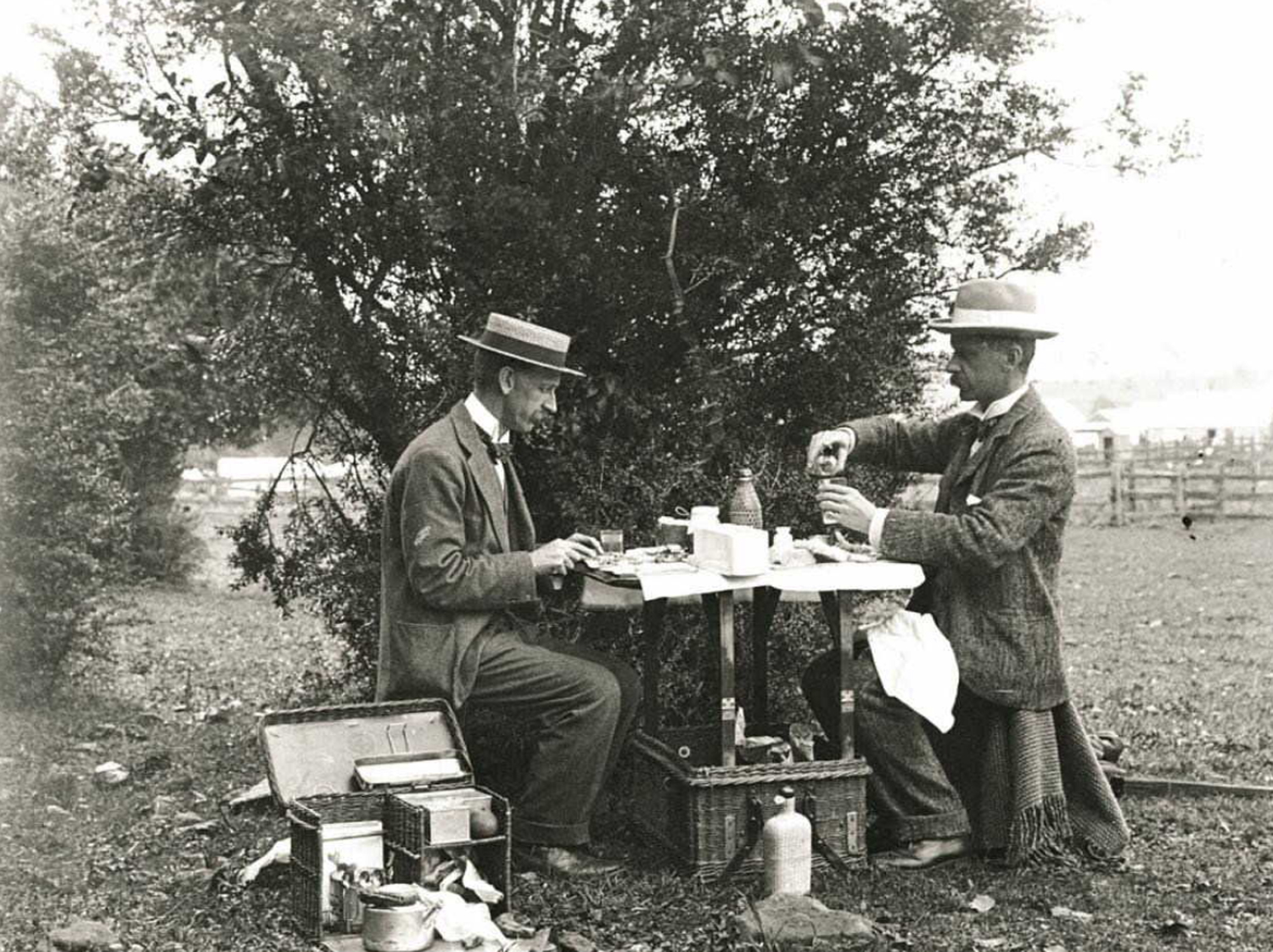
Arthur and Boyce Allen in 1900

When Henry Moore died, the property was purchased by Arthur Wigram Allen, in conjunction with his eldest brother, Boyce, on 11 December 1888. Arthur, well-known solicitor and Sydney identity, was married to Ethel, daughter of Watler Lamb who built the original Kambala on Bellevue Hill. Arthur was third of six sons of George Wigram Allen, whose father George founded the well known eponymous legal firm, Allens, and built Toxteth Park estate at Glebe. Arthur's youngest brother Walter was father of Oswald, known in the cricketing world as "Gubby Allen". He may have used Carrara's grounds and 20-metre long (65 ft) hall as a cricket pitch. Gubby Allen was the English test bowler in the famous "bodyline" series, lived at Carrara as a boy. Boyce Allen lived in the house with his family for over ten years.

Boyce Allen (1856–1945) was born in Glebe in 1856. His father was George Wigram Allen, a prominent solicitor and politician who owned Toxteth Park, Glebe which is now St Scholastica's College. He was one of eleven children, six boys and five girls. His brother Arthur Wigram Allen was also a solicitor and they went into partnership in a legal firm. Arthur was a very enthusiastic photographer and many of his photos depicting scenes of Sydney are still used in exhibitions.

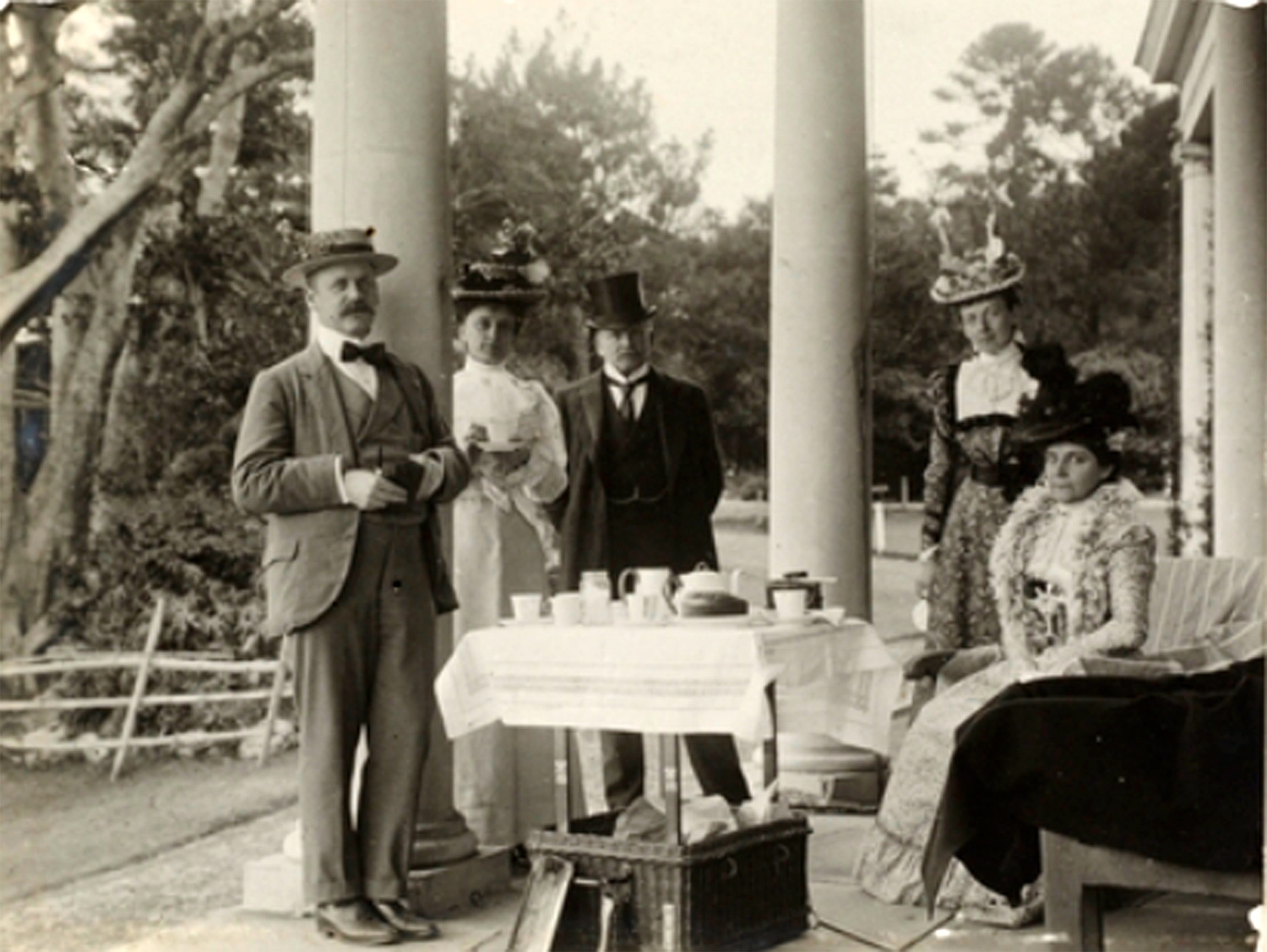
Afternoon tea at Strickland House in 1898

In 1888 Boyce married Isabella Dundas who was the daughter of Joseph Dundas a Scottish landowner who lived in Carron Hall in Stirlingshire. She came to Sydney to visit her relative Admiral Henry Fairfax who at that time was living at Admiralty House. It was during this short visit that she met Boyce Allen and shortly after they married. The couple moved to Strickland House immediately after their wedding. They had six children three boys and three girls. A niece of Boyce Allen described the family and the house in her memoirs:

Carrara (Strickland House) was about 8 miles from town and 4 miles from where we lived. It looked west across Rose Bay and had one of the most beautiful views in Sydney. The white stone house had curved and pillared verandahs and two great stone dogs on which I loved to ride, stood either side of the porch. The unkempt lawn ran down steeply to a small private beach and the garden melted into paddocks and natural bush. Wentworth House and Vaucluse House were about the only private homes beyond it before reaching the military settlement at South Head. We loved to drive out to Carrara to play and bathe with our cousins. Primrose and Marian were a little older than Joyce and Dundas was the same age as Denis.

During the Allen period of ownership, the Sands Directories for the following years list the occupants as:

- 1889 – Bennett, gardener;
- 1890–92 – Johanthon Seavers, CBP, MLA;
- 1893–96 – George Boyce Allen (Arthur's brother);
- 1897–98 – Dewley, gardener;
- 1899 – Mr Lyons;
- 1900–03 – Wilfred Inman, Boys Preparatory School (which moved to Moss Vale and became Tudor House);
- 1904 – George Boyce Allen;
- 1905–11 – Mrs J. P. Garvan.

==== Wilfred Inman, as a tenant ====
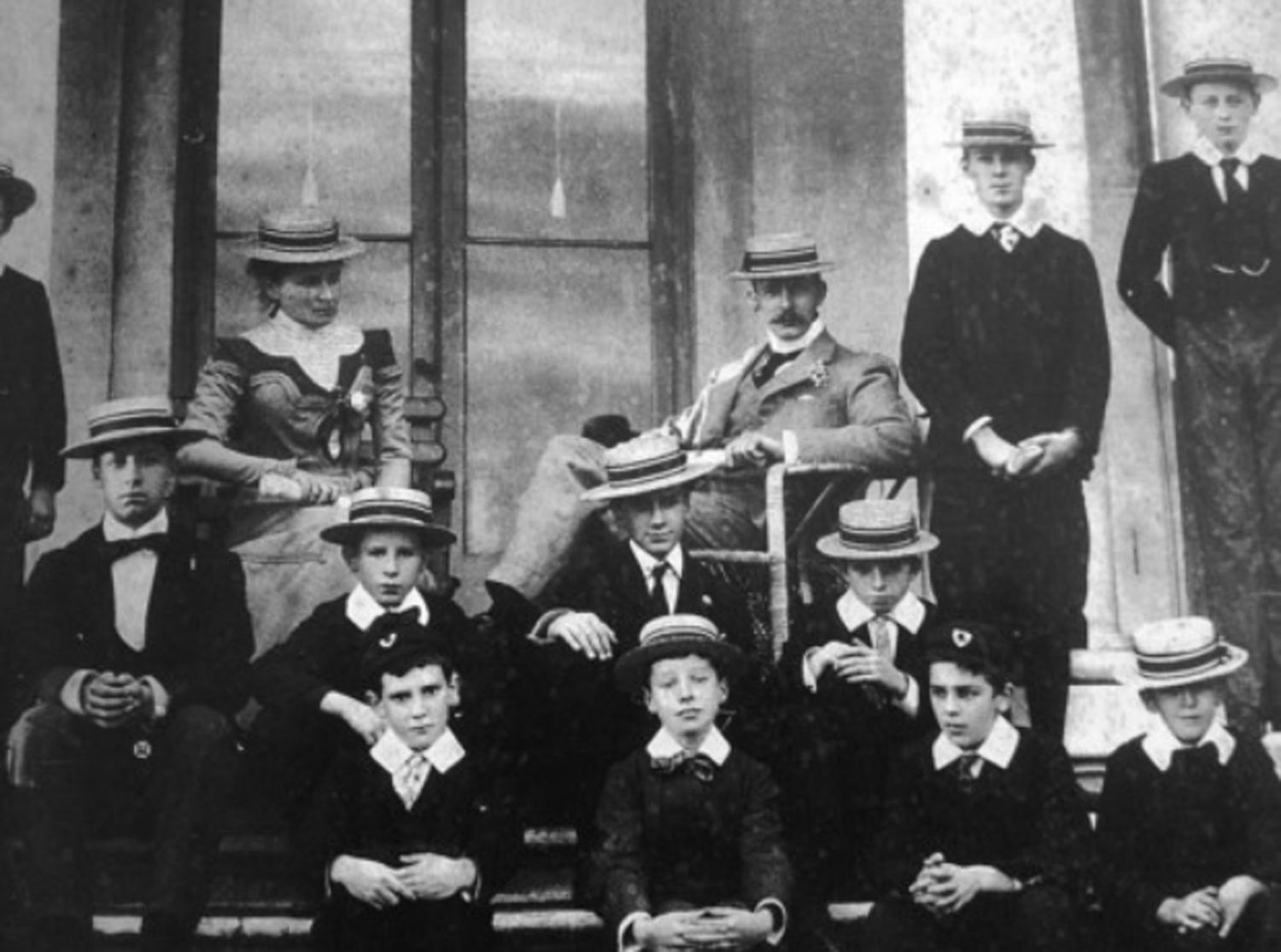
Wilfred and Mary Inman with student at Strickland House in 1899

Between 1899 and 1902 the house was let to Wilfred Alexander Inman who used the house as a school which later became Tudor House School, Moss Vale.

Wilfred Alexander Inman (1862–1950) was born at Spital Old Hall in Bebington, Cheshire in 1862. His father was Charles Inman, a wealthy merchant and his mother was Decima Isabella Catherine Davies. In 1882 at the age of 19 he immigrated to Melbourne on the ship Sobraon. Some years later he found employment at Groongal Station on the Murrumbidgee River. In 1897 he married Mary Martin, the daughter of Sir James Martin, Chief Justice of NSW, and Lady Isabella Martin. During her childhood Mary had lived at nearby Greycliffe House and later at Woollahra House.

In the same year as their marriage the Inmans started a school at Erewal in Bellevue Hill called the “Preparatory School for Boys”. This school was moved two years later to Strickland House. In later years Wilfred Inman wrote about his time at the house, commenting:

In the choice of a foundation of a school it must always be realised that if there is to be fruition, the public's reaction is of first importance. Thus Carrara (Strickland House) in its beautiful setting was of paramount importance to the moulding of character with the love of the beautiful. The house was ideally suited in every way, with lofty rooms and glorious views of Rose Bay... The grounds, now much curtailed, were then rich with beautiful trees and shrubs, with grass in front sloping down to a white sandy beach where there were dressing sheds and an enclosure for bathing. There we erected a shed for a boat kindly given to us by one of the parents.

In 1915 the Allen family sold Strickland House to the Government to become a hospital.

=== Use as a hospital ===
The siting and general design of the Strickland House site represents the picturesque aspirations of wealthy mid nineteenth century society. The garden and grounds of Strickland house are significant for their siting and development, largely credited to the Hosking period of ownership, according to romantic picturesque principles. The landscape of the Strickland House site is significant as a scale of grounds associated with a former harbour side "marine" villa residence adapted to institutional use and now open space with integral physical and visual connections with Sydney Harbour and adjacent Sydney Harbour National Park lands. The development of Strickland House's garden can be divided into two historical phases:

1. as the garden setting for a grand private residence, a Victorian marine villa on the shores of Sydney Harbour;
2. as the grounds of a convalescent home (c. 1915–1989).

The Stables building is a substantial outbuilding representing an extension of the facilities required to support a substantial family residence and property during the mid nineteenth century. Architecturally it exhibits idiosyncratic detailing that has an unfinished quality and makes this building rare. The relationship of the Stables to Carrara combined with its unusual details contribute to the aesthetic quality of the site and setting as a whole. In 1911 the NSW government established the Foreshores Resumption Scheme. Purchases made by the NSW government in 1912 and 1914 were significant factors that contributed to the site's preservation. The five-hectare (twelve-acre) property was purchased in June 1914 with funds from the Foreshore Resumption Scheme - the same scheme that paid for the adjacent Nielsen Park – "for a public recreation ground at Rose Bay" and "to be added to Nielsen Park". This was to satisfy public demand of the day for land on the foreshores of Sydney Harbour for public use in perpetuity.

The site was subsequently adapted to provide a public health care facility – a significant phase in the development of the site representing changing government attitudes in health care ideology in NSW. It reopened in 1915 as the Strickland House Convalescent Hospital for Women. The additional buildings (two large dormitories for men and women) constructed during the 1933 demonstrate the importance of the health care facility to the community and are a physical representation of occupation by the Department of Health.

When the Women's Convalescent facility was opened in 1915 it was named "The Strickland Convalescent Home for Women" after the then NSW Governor, Sir Gerald Strickland. Greycliffe House in Nielsen Park had been named after its acquisition "The Lady Edeline Hospital for Mothers and Babies" after this Governor's wife. Strickland House was still being used for respite care and long-term care after 1960, in addition to housing aged patients.

The convalescence and subsequently aged care facility operated on the site for seventy five continuous years, exceeding the period of residential use for the site. In 1960 it was used for both respite and long-term care. The NSW Department of Health ran the facility as a nursing home from 1915 to 1989. The hospital was closed in December 1989. A plan for 45 per cent of the land to be leased for 99 years and an additional 25 per cent to be leased separately was abandoned due to public backlash.

=== Subsequent use ===
Debate has continued over the best use of the grounds since the hospital closed in 1989. Woollahra History & Heritage Society (WHHS) president, Peter Poland, and his (late) wife, June, campaigned to preserve Strickland House and its grounds in community use for more than 22 years. The grounds constitute one of the finest public harbour side parks in Sydney, affording extensive and unparalleled views of Sydney Harbour. The landscape setting, and particularly the borrowed landscape of the Sydney Harbour National Park lands, including wharf remnants and the waters of Sydney Harbour, are integral to the property and its interpretation as a significant cultural landscape within the visual and spatial structure of Sydney Harbour. The setting that has been maintained is important as a historical scheme and to the contemporary community who widely appreciate it for its recreational value.

In 1992 the National Trust (NSW) arranged two Open Days attracting over 1400 people. The WHHS held a stall at this and published a booklet by June Poland "Carrara/Strickland House, the Finest Site on the Foreshores of Sydney Harbour". 1153 copies of this booklet have been sold at various public open days held by this society since 1998 and many before that date. A supplementary section to this booklet listing events relating to the site from 1992 to 2011 was added in that year. There were vigorous community protests against the Greiner Government selling off or leasing of parts of the grounds.

==== Administration under the Greiner and Fahey governments ====
A Strickland House Advisory Committee was established by then Planning Minister, Robert Webster, in January 1993 to call for, examine and recommend proposals for the property's future. Peter Debnam MP, after election as the Member for Vaucluse, established a Strickland House Review Group which developed "guiding principles" for the property. These included preserving the site's cultural heritage values and open space, while providing a framework for consistent decision-making in short and long-terms. They also included retaining public ownership and appropriate general public use and enjoyment. The Strickland House Advisory Committee suggested the buildings be made into strata units and a boutique hotel in 1993. This was strongly opposed and never came to fruition.

The current appreciation of the site is reflected in the site being declared an urban park (under the then Urban Parks Authority) by then Premier John Fahey in 1994. However, this was not gazetted. The public has had access to the grounds since 1994. A fence erected in the 1980s between the house grounds and Hermitage Foreshore Reserve (part of Sydney Harbour National Park) was removed in 1994.

==== Administration under the Carr, Iemma, Rees, and Keneally governments ====
After the 1995 election of the Carr government, the Urban Parks Authority was abolished and responsibility for Strickland House passed to the Minister for Public Works and Services. The Carr NSW government proposal in 1997 for a world-class boutique hotel met with strong community protests (1348 letters and 3474 petition signatures against it meant the plan was voted down) (as did Woollahra Municipal Council's draft LEP and DCP rezoning the site) and the proposal and rezoning were not adopted. Premier Carr in August 1997 launched the Government's "Vision for Sydney Harbour", which included maximum public access to and use of foreshore land, and protection of all items of heritage significance. It also included an intention to use State Planning powers to block development of Federal Defence harbourside land.

In 1998 Woollahra Municipal Council held community workshops to develop draft land use, conservation and development principles for the property, endorsing these and referring them to the NSW Department of Public Works and Services for comment. In 1999 Strickland House (and then 55% of its estate) was entered on the NSW State Heritage Register. In 2000 the WHHS made a submission to the Heritage Council seeking extension of its SHR curtilage to include the whole estate. Woollahra Municipal Council adopted the land use, conservation and development principles for the property. At an annual open day in 2002 the WHHS noted a record attendance and people from over 150 Sydney suburbs and many places elsewhere, who signed a petition and letters to then Premier Carr. In 2003 a revised conservation management plan's preparation was announced by The Hon. John Della Bosca MLC, Minister for Commerce. At an annual open day in 2004 a new record of people from over 162 suburbs of Sydney and other places visited the site and signed petition and letters to Premier Carr seeking retention in public ownership, no sale or long-term lease and control on development, subdivision and refurbishment of the house.

The Strickland House site was transferred from NSW Treasury ownership to the State Property Authority on 1 September 2006. Conservation works to the exterior of the house have since been undertaken, including removal of the fire escape stairs and glass verandah infill on the west and south facades. Deteriorated corrugated iron sheet roofing of service wings was replaced and the building repainted. Ground floor interiors of the house have been largely restored.

In 2009 the State Property Authority was transferred into a new Super Ministry for Services and Administration under then Premier Rees. In 2010 the conservation management plan was being updated and a Concept Use Plan was in development to guide potential development on the property. The Occupational Therapy Block and covered way linking South Dormitory, Occupational Therapy Block and rear service wings were removed between 2009 and 2011. In 2011 the sandstone retaining wall along Vaucluse Road was repointed, a render capping applied and the boundary fence replaced. In 2011 the WHHS sought the support of an incoming O'Farrell government to rezone the property to fulfil the intention of the State Government's promise in 1914 - "for a public recreation ground at Rose Bay".

==== Administration under the O'Farrell, Baird, and Berejiklian governments ====
The State Planning Authority sought private sector interest in rezoning parts of the site for residential or commercial use, including options of low-density housing, small business spaces and a function centre. The draft conservation management plan for the site proposes changes to its zoning. At an August 2012 Community Cabinet meeting, the Society requested Minister for Heritage, Robyn Parker consider gazetting the Strickland House land as a Public Park. The Society has been advised that the Office of Environment & Heritage does not have the authority to do this. An on-site caretaker is employed to maintain the site and coordinate various fund-raising activities.

In October 2012, Woollahra Council, following discussions with the State Property Authority, now called Government Property NSW (GPN) considered the appropriate zoning for the Strickland House site. GPN submitted consultant's advice that the appropriate zone was either R2 low density residential or SP2 infrastructure (the Society understands this to be commercial). Woollahra Council staff opposed this and recommended that RE1 Public Recreation was the appropriate zoning. The Society, National Trust (NSW), the Rose Bay Residents Association and others supported the staff recommendation which, in due course, was adopted by Woollahra Council. The GPN proposal led to some speculation that the Government was intending to sell off part of the estate. This was denied by Finance Minister Greg Pearce, and local MP, Gabrielle Upton.

The remainder of the site was listed on the NSW State Heritage Register in 2012. The site has been open to the public annually on 4 May since 1996. This coincides with the National Trust of Australia (NSW) Heritage Festival.

In April 2013, the Public Works Department, working for Government Property NSW, commenced work on both the Stables and former Gardener's Cottage near the main gateway. Extensive work was done to the Stables including a new tiled roof with skylights, extensive stonework restoration and all woodwork has been repaired and painted. Works to the Gardener's Cottage were also completed. Both buildings contained asbestos. The two dormitory blocks and former Nurses' Quarters were fenced off. Their external paint contained lead and was to be stripped off. Security for the property has been managed by a private contractor since September 2014. Government Property NSW approved a proposal to install a seat at the site in memory of June Poland, who played a key part in the campaign to save Strickland House over the years and wrote the booklet on the property's history. On an open day on 3 May 2015 Gabrielle Upton MP unveiled a special memorial seat honouring the life and contribution to heritage of June Poland OAM (1935–2013).

=== Use in popular culture ===
The house exteriors and surrounding garden and beach were used for the fictional Koolunga School which was the sister school of Eastland in The Facts of Life Down Under.

In 2007 the grounds and house of Strickland House were used by Baz Luhrmann in filming parts of his movie Australia, doubling as Government House, Darwin. It has also been used for film and TV shoots for Underbelly, The Apprentice and The Farmer Wants a Wife as well as for The Krait. A TV series called Flat Chat made an episode of the UK series The Minder.

== Description ==
=== Estate and grounds ===
The Strickland House site comprises c. 4.8-hectare (12-acre) harbourside land near Neilson Park in Vaucluse. The land parcel closely reflects the original subdivision from the land grant made to William Wentworth in the 1830s. It contains buildings landscaping and other structures relating to the history of the site from Aboriginal ownership through its colonial history as a grand maritime estate to its 20th century use as a convalescent home and later aged care facility.

The landscape setting of Carrara and the later hospital buildings contain a number of elements including the looped carriage entrance, pathways, stone edged garden beds terraces lawns, a croquet court, a landscaped creek and pond and a sandstone quarry. There are mature plantings many of which date from the healthcare facility phase of the sites history and a number from earlier phases of its development. The forested backdrop of scattered native trees on the high land to the east of the site is thought to be an intended original "picturesque" feature of the landscaping and is still retained.

A number of pedestrian paths lace the property, some following the slopes in gentle falls, some marked by steps to manage steeper sections. Most have been surfaced with concrete in the twentieth century and the main driveway has been paved with bitumen and patched at various intervals, although it retains its early configuration and form, approaching the mansion indirectly to give a series of views on approach, deliberately manipulating the visitor's view. In 1994 Premier John Fahey declared all the grounds an Urban Park. In January 2012 the NSW Government gazetted that the NSW State Heritage Register listing for Strickland House had been extended to cover the entire property. Currently the grounds are open to the public during daylight hours seven days a week. The house is used for films, advertising etc., but is open to the public one day a year during the National Trust's Heritage Festival. It can be seen from the track along Hermitage Reserve, which is part of the Sydney Harbour National Park.

=== Garden ===
A number of mature trees and shrub plantings dominate and give character to densely planted boundaries, internal terraces, shrubberies and borders bounding the curving driveway to the mansion, its framed views west to the harbour, lower slopes around the croquet green, borders around the Service area, Stables, Dormitory buildings, etc.

Some of these trees have significance in their own right, reflecting the tastes, contacts and reach of empire of the mid-late 19th century. These include Himalayan chir pine (Pinus roxburghii) - of which there are a few specimens, some 18 m tall (1989, more so now), stone pines from the Mediterranean (Pinus pinea) with characteristic flat crowns and pine nuts, New South Wales and Queensland rainforest species such as hoop pines (Araucaria cunninghamii), a giant bamboo (Bambusa balcooa), various Chinese hibiscus (Hibiscus rosa-sinensis), a camphor laurel (Cinnamommum camphora), Port Jackson or rusty fig (Ficus rubiginosa), African olives (Olea europaea subsp. cuspidata) (probably former hedge species), a large mature bull bay or evergreen magnolia (Magnolia grandiflora) from the Southern US (over 3 stories tall in 1989, more so now), a large mature tuckeroo (Cupaniopsis anacardioides) a locally native coastal species, Canary Island date palm (Phoenix canariensis), Camellia japonica, and Indian hawthorn (Raphiolepis sp.). Also on site is a rather uncommon (in NSW) tipu tree from Bolivia, (Tipuana tipu), and an unusual locally native small tree, Monotoca elliptica, 2 m tall.

=== Mansion ===
Strickland House is a Victorian Italianate mansion virtually intact and consists of three storeys of sandstone, which was unusually painted, and features verandahs with Doric columns. Set close to the harbour foreshore, it has extensive views across the water. The original mansion, Carrara, remains essentially intact and located to capture 180 degree views to the harbour. The two storey residence is constructed of dressed sandstone stone walls with painted finishes. There is an attic storey made of timber. While the building is planned on a rectangle the colonnaded verandahs on two sides, including a two-storey semicircular projection on the west facade and the stone portico/iron balcony (first floor) on the north side are asymmetrically arranged. The verandahs on the west and south elevations feature a colonnade of doric columns.

The downstairs rooms of the formal part of the house are arranged around a central hallway. To the west are the formal reception rooms which feature cedar framed french doors allowing views of the harbour from these rooms. Various rooms lie on the eastern side. All these rooms retain their cedar and plaster details with some modifications to the cedar skirtings. Beneath the dining room there is a large cellar. The first floor originally contains bedrooms and bathrooms and these were later converted to wards and offices.

=== Service area ===
The service area containing servants quarters, kitchen and laundry is located to the east on the east of the house and are arranged around a courtyard which has been infilled with partitions and ramps during the building's use as a health care facility.

=== Coach house ===
To the east of Carrara lies a stables and coach house dating from the original phase of construction in. The L-shaped building is constructed of dressed sandstone with gabled roofs. Multi-paned timber windows are arranged across each elevation and retain sandstone sills except where there have been modifications. Internally the building retains its original layout and also it sandstone flag floors.

=== Dormitory buildings ===
To the north west of Carrara is a large masonry hospital dormitory building constructed in the 1930s in the Georgian Revival style. Another similarly styled dormitory building lies to the south of Carrara. On higher land to the north east of Carrara lies a third building constructed in the neo Georgian style in the 1930s. This was the nurses home for the convalescent hospital.

=== Condition ===
The site's intact nature makes it a valuable technical and research resource. The analysis and interpretation of archaeological remains from this site may provide evidence of the material culture of the various occupants of the site as well as contributing to the understanding of the design and development of gardens in mid-nineteenth century Sydney. Beyond the quarry and the site of the former Porter's Lodge, the archaeological potential of the site and its specific nature are unknown, however any evidence may contribute knowledge into substantive research questions.

=== Modifications ===
In 2010, the demolition of buildings 3 and 4 (c. 1960s – c. 1970s), a covered way and a former occupational therapy block to the rear of the house occurred.

== Heritage listing ==
As at 16 February 2004, The Strickland House site on Sydney Harbour, Vaucluse, is of exceptional historical significance as a remarkably intact 1850s villa with a largely unaltered landscape setting. The site demonstrates an important component of the early settlement patterns in the district, being part of an early land grant (originally made to William Charles Wentworth) that has not been subdivided.

The original building Carrara is an exceptional example of an early Victorian Italianate style marine mansion designed for a picturesque setting. This is one of the better known domestic works of the nineteenth century architectural firm of Hilly and Mansfield, the design largely attributed to John F. Hilly. "As part of a wider network of mansions including Vaucluse House and Greycliffe House it helps to demonstrate and explain the formative influences, social status and desirable qualities of this part of Sydney during the nineteenth century". The intact nature of the original residence and its landscape setting, including the strong relationship that remains between the house and the water, are rare in the context of metropolitan Sydney. The remnants of the sandstone wharf adjacent to Milk Beach contributes to the strength of this association.

The siting and general design of the Strickland House site represents the picturesque aspirations of wealthy mid nineteenth century society. The house continues to display the landmark qualities that were important to the historical scheme, and the layout and relationship of various elements demonstrate class distinctions and hierarchical relationships that existed in the mid nineteenth century.

Carrara is of exceptional aesthetic significance, being of high architectural merit and containing many original features. The intactness of both internal and external details dating back to the 1850s enhances the significance of the property as an example of early Victorian workmanship and taste. The two-storey segmental bay projection is striking and represents a relatively early use of such a feature.

The Stables building is a noteworthy example of a substantial outbuilding, representing an extension of the facilities required to support a substantial family residence and property during the mid nineteenth century. Architecturally, the Stables exhibits idiosyncratic detailing that has an unfinished quality and makes this building a rare example of its kind. The relationship of the Stables to Carrara combined with its unusual details contribute to the aesthetic quality of the site and setting as a whole. The site's associations with the historical figures of William Charles Wentworth, the original owner of the property, John Hosking, who substantially developed the grounds of Carrara, and subsequent occupants including Henry Moore and members of the Allen family are also of significance. The status of these people as leading political figures in the nineteenth century ensured that Carrara was well known within important social circles in Sydney at that time. The Strickland House site maintains its exceptional social significance today, in particular within the local area, and displays landmark qualities that can be appreciated from a wide surrounding area.

Purchases made by the NSW government in 1912 and 1914 were significant factors that have contributed to the preservation of the site. The subsequent adaptation of the site to provide a public health care facility marks a significant phase in the development of the Strickland House site and represents changing government attitudes in health care ideology in NSW. The additional buildings constructed during the 1930s demonstrate the importance of the health care facility to the community and are a physical representation of occupation by the Department of Health. The convalescence and subsequently aged care facility operated on the site for seventy five continuous years, exceeding the period of residential use for the site.

The garden and grounds of Strickland house are of cultural significance on a state level for their siting and development, largely credited to the Hosking period of ownership, according to romantic picturesque principles. The landscape of the Strickland House site is of exceptional cultural significance as a scale of grounds associated with a former harbourside "marine" villa residence adapted to institutional use and now open space with integral physical and visual connections with Sydney Harbour and adjacent Sydney Harbour National Park lands. Despite adaptation, the original qualities of the landscape may still be appreciated.

The grounds of the Strickland House site constitute one of the finest public harbourside parks in Sydney, affording extensive and unparalleled views of Sydney Harbour. The landscape setting, and particularly the borrowed landscape of the Sydney Harbour National Park lands, including wharf remnants and the waters of Sydney Harbour, are integral to the property and its interpretation as a significant cultural landscape within the visual and spatial structure of Sydney Harbour. The setting that has been maintained is important as a historical scheme and to the contemporary community who widely appreciate it for its recreational value. The current appreciation of the site is reflected in the site being declared an urban park in 1994.

The site's intact nature makes it a valuable technical and research resource. The analysis and interpretation of archaeological remains form this site may provide evidence of the material culture of the various occupants of the site as well as contributing to the understanding of the design and development of gardens in mid-nineteenth century Sydney. Beyond the quarry and the site of the former Porter's Lodge, the archaeological potential of the site and its specific nature are unknown, however any evidence may contribute knowledge into substantive research questions.

The extended curtilage of this item reflects more closely the original subdivision of the land and ensures inclusion of the original landscape setting for the house as well as fabric relating to the site's precontact use by Aboriginal people and its later significant use as a convalescent hospital and aged care facility.

Strickland House was listed on the New South Wales State Heritage Register on 2 April 1999 having satisfied the following criteria.

"The place is important in demonstrating the course, or pattern, of cultural or natural history in New South Wales."

Carrara is part of a select group of houses owned and built by influential members of society in the mid nineteenth century. The Strickland House site is of considerable historic significance as it represents the picturesque aspirations of wealthy members of society during the second half of the nineteenth century, and how those aspirations were implemented in the Australian context. The intactness of Carrara and the landscape setting of the Estate contributes to an understanding of the cultural history of NSW. "The site is an important and largely intact component of the earliest settlement pattern of the district. It preserves an important component of an early land grant with particular associations for the Wentworth family through its excision as a marriage portion for their daughter Thomasine. In this, also, it demonstrates customs or habits no longer current in our society".

"The relationship of the various components is particularly clear in demonstrating the relationships of the family and staff and, as such, is an optimal example of a particular class of mansions and the social hierarchies which operated in them. As part of a wider network of mansions including Vaucluse House and Greycliffe House it helps to demonstrate and explain the formative influences in this part of Sydney".

"Carrara also was important as the site for the early beginnings of Tudor house, a famous private school at Moss Vale [formerly] associated with the Kings School. Carrara was home to this institution during the years 1899 - 1902. The use of a private house and staff and the arrangement of the school in this environment is particularly illuminating with respect to practices and philosophies of education for the affluent at the turn of the century".

The Strickland House site is significant for seventy-five continuous years of health care commencing in 1915. The establishment of the convalescent hospital was the realisation of a NSW Labour Government initiative to reduce the pressures on metropolitan hospitals by providing trained supervision in an environment of less intense medical, nursing and technical services.

"In its earliest years Strickland House was a particularly important service for women and especially new mothers. The adaptation of Greycliffe House at approximately the same time for the purposes of child health care marks an important step in an area of women's health care".

The amalgamation of the Strickland House site of the convalescent facility for women with the men's facility, formerly from Denistone Hose, Eastwood, in the 1930s reflects further the changing attitudes within the broader health care system. The significance of the gardens and grounds of the Strickland House site derives from the following:

- Its siting and development according to picturesque principles. The gardens and grounds of the site were prominent in their own time and the survival of the largely intact harbourside park and its relationship to Sydney Harbour is rare.
- Its association with John Hosking, who developed the gardens at Strickland House during his period of ownership
- Its association for seventy-five years with the Department of Health. The purchase of the site in 1914 by the NSW Government for harbourside parkland is a significant factor that has contributed to the preservation of the extensive parkland setting to Carrara.

"The place has a strong or special association with a person, or group of persons, of importance of cultural or natural history of New South Wales's history."

The property has a strong historical connection with William Charles Wentworth, and explorer and social figure in New South Wales. W.C. Wentworth, an important member of society during the 1830s, was also granted several additional parcels of land at Rose Bay which contributed to making him one of the largest land holders in the area. The site is associated with several people of renown, in particular leading social and political figures of the nineteenth century. As well as the original owner W.C. Wentworth, the Strickland House site is associated with the following people:

- The architect, John F Hilly who designed the house in the early 1850s
- John Hosking, the first Mayor of the Council of the City of Sydney in 1842, who owned and developed the property between 1855 and 1876. Hosking's wife was the daughter of Samuel Terry, known as the 'Botany Bay Rothschild'
- The Honourable Henry Moore of Sydney, a member of the Legislative Council and respected member of society, who purchased the block on which Carrara is sited in 1883. Moore occupied the property until his death in 1888.
- Arthur Wigram Allen, whose family made a significant contribution to the development of Sydney. Arthur Allen, along with his brothers, was to become part of the famous legal firm of Allen, Allen & Helmsley. The firm was established by the Honourable George Allen, Arthur's grandfather in 1822 and is the longest running law firm in Australia, which for over 150 years had at least one member of the family as a board member.

Carrara House is significant as an intact work of John F Hilly an architect of some fashionable villas for the wealthy in addition to commercial and ecclesiastical designs during the 1840s and 1850s.

"The place is important in demonstrating aesthetic characteristics and/or a high degree of creative or technical achievement in New South Wales."

The house and setting of the Strickland House site are particularly significant as a picturesque Italianate composition. The picturesque ideal involved contrasting tamed expanses of open landscape with clusters of rough or "wild" outcrops of rocks or stands of trees. Strickland House was placed to take advantage of the ideal romantic site on Sydney Harbour with the vegetated area between the carriage drive and Vaucluse Road functioning as a backdrop. Both the setting and the house designed for it remain an exceptionally intact example of picturesque landscaping and design from the 1850s. These same aspects can be appreciated today despite the constraints of its setting. "The land, gardens, buildings and other works contained within Carrara/Strickland House demonstrate an evolving landscape of over one hundred and forty years, reflecting popular and personal tastes and fashions as well as institutional philosophies of patient care and wellbeing. The property is a particularly good example of the marine style mansions popular in this district and others which were designed to take advantage of the spectacular water views. The mixed planting of evergreen and deciduous trees and shrubs together with the topographic variety, the vistas and views, the features such as walls, terraces and paths have produced a landscape with a strong design quality and character which is in stark contrast [to] the subdivided areas surrounding it. The later additions to the buildings and gardens have not substantially compromised these aspects". The open space leading towards Rose Bay and Sydney Harbour provides views that extend from Point Piper to Mosman and the city of Sydney. These views are integral to the landscaped scheme and are of considerable aesthetic importance. The open space is of importance not only as a historical scheme, but also for the contemporary community as the Strickland House site can be appreciated from many surrounding vantage points. As such the setting, including the borrowed landscape of the Sydney Harbour National Park, of Strickland House must be regarded as highly significant. The Strickland House site has landmark qualities as an exceptional space within the local landscape. The siting of Strickland House, the open landscape above Sydney Harbour and the vegetated backdrop against which these elements were sited combine to give the site landmark qualities. The Strickland House site remains as one of the finest public harbourside parks in Sydney and is arguably the grandest intact Italianate mansion in its landscape setting still extant in metropolitan Sydney. Carrara is an exceptional example of the work of architect John F Hilly, being of imposing scale and with a semi-circular two storey segmental bay projection. It seems Hilly was adept in the use of both the picturesque Gothic and the Italianate, as there are examples of his work in both of these styles. Aesthetically, the design of the house reflects the fashion for classically derived landscape architecture. The front curved projecting bay with Doric columns and extensive verandas complement the picturesque setting of the house. As a remarkably intact John F Hilly designed residence, Carrara is of exceptional aesthetic significance. Carrara is of high architectural quality both in its conception and in its decorative details. It contains many original features including marble chimneypieces imported from Italy in the 1850s and generally high quality cedar doors and joinery. Though there have been several unsympathetic additions to the house and various alterations to the interior (mostly to ceilings and kitchen/bathroom fitouts), these have not significantly altered the basic plan and have left most original decorative detail intact. There is good potential to restore the house to the distinguished character that it had during the 1850s and beyond as a grand residence of Sydney. The intactness of the house in both exterior and interior details makes it of extremely high significance as an example of early Victorian workmanship and taste in the 1850s. The idiosyncratic features of the Stables building, including projecting sandstone blocks, quoins at one corner only and gable end finished in brick masonry, have an eccentric aesthetic appeal. The significance of the gardens and grounds of the Strickland House site derives partly from the relationship between the house and the garden. Overall, as the setting for an important 1850s villa, it is of exceptional importance for its ability to demonstrate close adherence to mid nineteenth century design principles, for its surviving early fabric and for its mature plantings. The entire area to the south west of the Northern Dormitory (Block A) has been modified to form a large open space affording panoramic views over Sydney Harbour. The qualities of this open landscape are rare within Sydney Harbour.

"The place has a strong or special association with a particular community or cultural group in New South Wales for social, cultural or spiritual reasons."

The association of Carrara with some leading social and political figures of the nineteenth century, combined with the exceptional nature of the Estate, ensured that "Carrara was particularly well known in the social life of nineteenth century Sydney". Schools generally have a strong level of social significance as community facilities. The site has some social significance for its use between 1899 and 1902 as a boys school, the forerunner to Tudor House now located at Moss Vale. The resumption of the foreshore land of several properties, including Carrara, by the Minister for Lands in 1912 as part of the establishment of a public reserve is a significant factor in the history of the site. These private properties along the Rose Bay foreshore were identified early as having the potential to provide public recreational space. The subsequent purchase of Carrara and its grounds by the NSW Government in 1914 "for a Public Recreation Ground at Rose Bay" recognises the importance of establishing such a community facility and is of social significance. During occupation by the Department of Health, the site functioned as a convalescent hospital, which was used as a public facility for the people of New South Wales. The Strickland House site is one of only two sites developed as Department of Health Convalescent Homes. Since the closure of the convalescent facility in 1989, continued public demands for all of the grounds to be public parkland demonstrate contemporary social significance. The subsequent declaration of the site as an urban park in 1994 has reinforced the social significance of the property. Contemporary community esteem is further demonstrated by ht inclusion of the property on various heritage registers, being considered one of the finest houses in Sydney from its inception, has retained the landmark status that was recognised from its mid nineteenth century establishment. The house in particular is significant in its adaptation and operation as a public facility for convalescent purposes subsequent to purchase by the NSW Government. The Northern and Southern Dormitory Blocks (A & B respectively), Nurses' Home and Caretaker's Cottage, designed and built by the Department of Public Works during the 1930s, are significant as representations of the occupation of the site for a substantial period by the Department of Health. Construction of these additional buildings to support the ongoing function of the convalescent hospital established in 1915 demonstrated the ongoing social importance of this facility to the community. The occasional use of the Nurses Home as rooms for film sets by filmmaking students represents the utility and adaptability of this building and its ongoing usefulness as a community facility. Carrara/Strickland House and its surrounding landscape have considerable community esteem at both a local and a state level. Contemporary interest in the remnant Estate clearly demonstrates the value attached to the gardens and grounds as an integral component of Carrara and a public recreation facility.

"The place has potential to yield information that will contribute to an understanding of the cultural or natural history of New South Wales."

"The high degree of integrity of both the main house interior and exterior as well as that of the garden make Carrara a valuable research tool and example of taste and style particularly during the nineteenth century. The garden, in particular, contains a valuable resource of plants and stonework". The remaining features of the garden and grounds of Strickland House have the potential to reveal the early cultural and natural landscape of the place. The analysis and interpretation of the archaeological remains from this site may provide evidence of the material culture of the various occupants of the site as well as contributing to the understanding of the design and development of gardens in mid nineteenth century Sydney. Any evidence of remains on the site may be able to contribute knowledge into several research questions, however with few exceptions current information indicates that the potential archaeology of the site is non specific in its nature and location. Regardless, potential archaeology at the Strickland House site may be related to the following research areas:

- The material culture of Carrara/Strickland House and grounds may contain artefacts and structures whose analysis can provide us with socio-economic information about elite living conditions, including patterns of consumption, in addition to working, accommodation and living conditions for employees in Victorian properties.
- The analysis of the underfloor deposits may be able to add to our knowledge about identification of socio-economic status, gender relations and other areas of substantive archaeological research pertinent to the various phases of occupation.
- Location of structural remains of outbuildings associated with Carrara/Strickland House would add to and improve our understanding of the layout of early Victorian estates.

"The place possesses uncommon, rare or endangered aspects of the cultural or natural history of New South Wales."

The house combined with its setting is a rare example of a relatively intact picturesque landscape scheme form the 1850s. The high integrity of the land immediately surrounding the house offers a rare opportunity for the appreciation of a picturesque aesthetic as designed in the mid nineteenth century. Carrara is a rare surviving example of an early Victorian mansion of substantial scale retaining not only its spacious landscaped grounds, but also its near original relationship to the harbour. It is one of the few surviving properties of this period that retains both its substantial grounds and a relationship to the water. "The preservation of not only the house, but the main outbuildings, drive and garden make it a rare example to survive the subdivision process". Carrara is an exceptionally intact and excellent example of John F Hilly's work that contains a distinctive two storey bow front veranda not common to residences designed at that time. The original fabric is of the highest quality, in particular the joinery and the stonework. Carrara and also Greycliffe House in the adjacent Nielsen Park are rare surviving examples of the domestic work of John F Hilly. Although relatively plainly finished on the exterior, the Stables building contains some very unusual features, notably:

1. quoins included only at the Western corner
2. brick masonry gable end above stone walling
3. the unfinished quality of the projecting stone blocks at the southern corner
4. the irregular projecting dry stone wall constructed along the south west facade.

The specimen of tuckeroo (Cupaniopsis anacardioides) located at the top of the slope in the vicinity of Strickland House has some scientific value as an indicator of the natural littoral rainforest vegetation of the site.

"The place is important in demonstrating the principal characteristics of a class of cultural or natural places/environments in New South Wales."

Carrara is an example of a marine mansion, the likes of which were constructed in the local area to accommodate socially influential families. Architecturally, the institutional buildings are comparable with other institutional buildings designed in the 1930s by the Department of Public Works. As such the buildings are of representational significance as typical examples of their time designed by a Government department.

== See also ==
- Australian residential architectural styles
