= John Frederick Hilly =

Australian architect

- Born: John Frederick Hilly; 1810; Warwickshire, United Kingdom
- Died: 3 September 1883 (aged 72–73); Potts Point, Sydney Australia
- Resting place: Waverley Cemetery
- Occupation: Architect
- Years active: 1839 – 1870s
- Known for: Mid-nineteenth-century Sydney architecture

John Frederick Hilly (c. 1810 – 3 September 1883) was a surveyor and architect who designed commercial buildings, churches and houses in mid-nineteenth-century Sydney. He was born in Warwickshire and arrived in Australia in 1839. On 8 January 1842 Hilly married Ellen Morgan at Christ Church St Laurence in Sydney. Hilly Street in Mortlake, New South Wales, is named in his honour. Works attributed to Hilly include:

- In 1842 Hilly designed a Victorian Rustic Gothic style house for the widow of Thomas Smith. The property known as the Dower House is now part of the Ascham School campus in Edgecliff.
- In 1844 Hilly designed a Victorian Rustic Gothic sandstone house for Oswald Bloxsome known as The Rangers near Spofforth Street, between Rangers Avenue and Brierly Street in Mosman. Despite protests by the local community in 1914 it was demolished.
- The 1844 designed St Patrick's Catholic Church in The Rocks, Sydney, is his earliest known ecclesiastical building.
- In 1846 Hilly designed a two-storey stone cottage known as Percyville and that house forms most of the front of the present house that is now Bishopscourt at Darling Point.
- In 1847 Hilly designed St Thomas's Anglican Church in Enfield consisting of a sanctuary, chancel, nave and vestry, surmounted by a spire on a square Norman tower.
- In 1852 Hilly designed a Victorian Rustic Gothic sandstone house known as Greycliffe for members of the family of William Charles Wentworth at Vaucluse.
- In 1853 Hilly designed the Sydney Exchange which in 1901 became known as the Royal Exchange of Sydney and was demolished in 1964.
- In 1854 Hilly designed a bank building for the Commercial Banking Company of Sydney on the corner of George Street and Barrack Street, Sydney. In 1923 Leslie Wilkinson dismantled the building stone by stone and rebuilt it on the campus of the University of Sydney where it now houses a Post Office and the Sydney Pharmacy School.
- In 1856 Hilly designed Carrara at Vaucluse for John Hosking who had been the first elected mayor of Sydney. The house is now known as Strickland House.
- In 1856 Hilly designed Bomera in Potts Point a two-storey Sydney sandstone house in the early Italianate style with a two-storey building serving as stables and coach house.
- In 1860 Hilly designed the first grandstand at Randwick Racecourse. It was constructed for the first race meeting and was built of American timber. Although it was intended to be temporary it stood for 15 years.
- In 1864 Hilly designed Fiona for Edward Knox of the Colonial Sugar Refining Company and it is also part of the Ascham School campus in Edgecliff. It has an identical front elevation to Bomera in Potts Point.
- Hilly designed two Victorian Rustic Gothic style stone houses that have since been demolished in the Inner Western Suburbs of Sydney. The Sydney physician, Dr George Fortescue, bought an estate on the Parramatta River in 1851. He named the area Chiswick after the village on the Thames River in Devonshire. His home Wymston was built in the 1860s on Blackwall Point Road. In the same era Hilly designed Barnstaple Manor on Rodd Point in Iron Cove for the Sydney solicitor Brent Clements Rodd.
- The 1860s additions to the John Verge designed mansion Tusculum in Potts Point, including the cast iron balustrade design, are attributed to Hilly. The design is very similar to his work at Fiona and Guntawang.
- In 1869 Hilly designed the homestead at Guntawang at Mudgee. The building is a single-storey version of his design for Carrara at Vaucluse.
- The 1863 Hilly designed Prince of Wales Theatre in Castlereagh Street, Sydney, was burnt down in 1872.
- In 1870 Hilly designed The Oddfellows Hall at 38 Queen Street Woollahra for the Lodge of the Manchester United Independent Order of Oddfellows. It was restored in the 1970s by Leo and Anne Schofield as Queen Street Galleries.

== Gallery ==
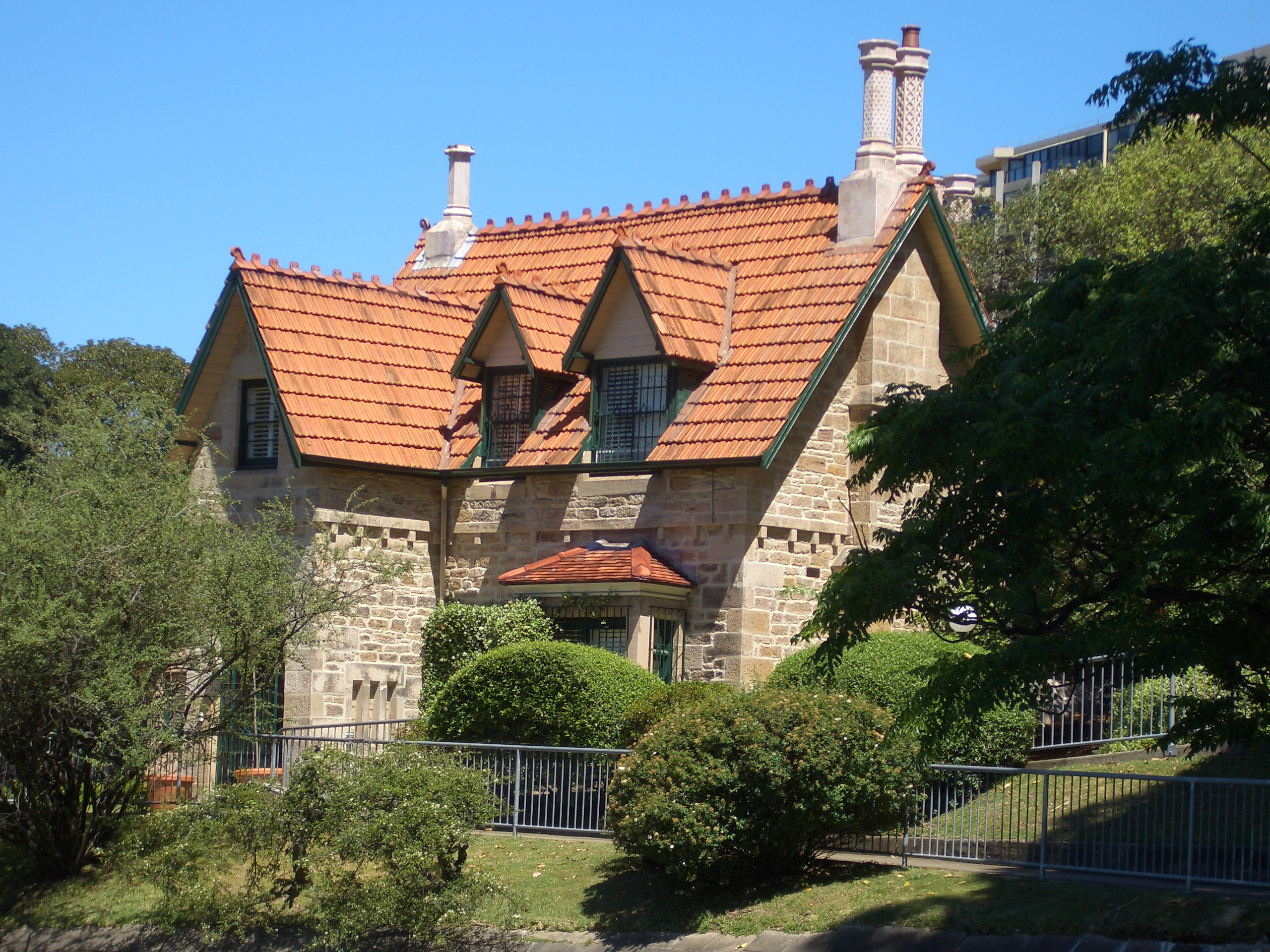
Dower House at Ascham School

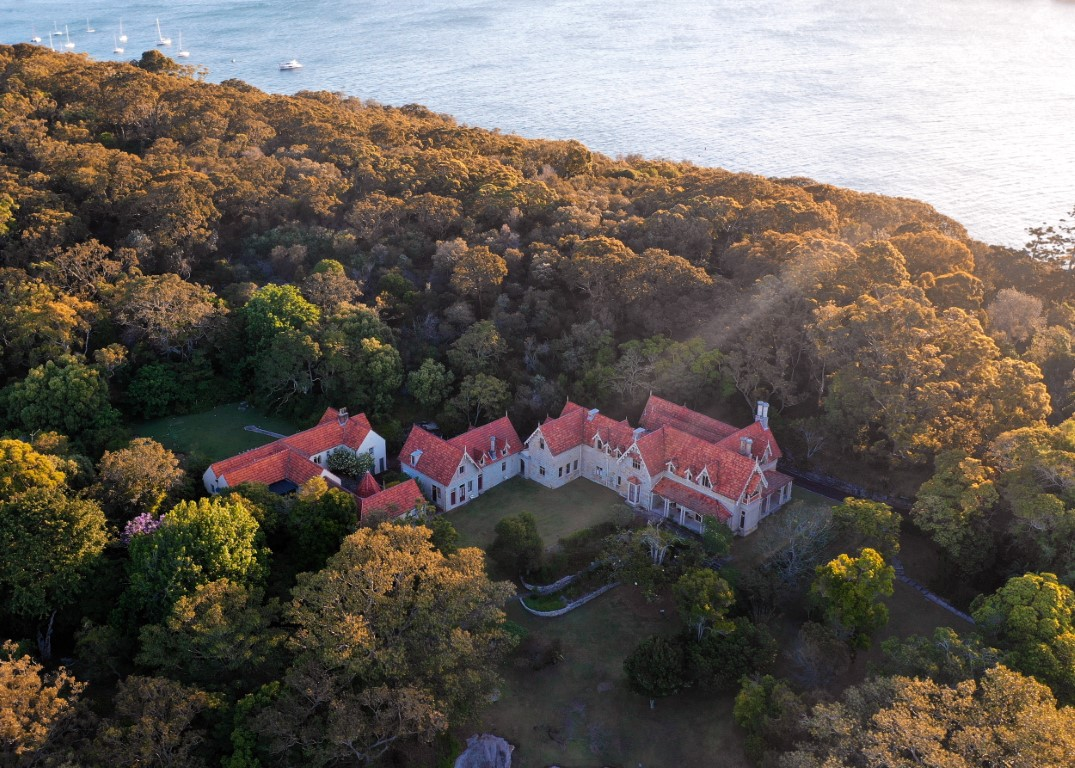
Greycliffe House in Nielsen Park

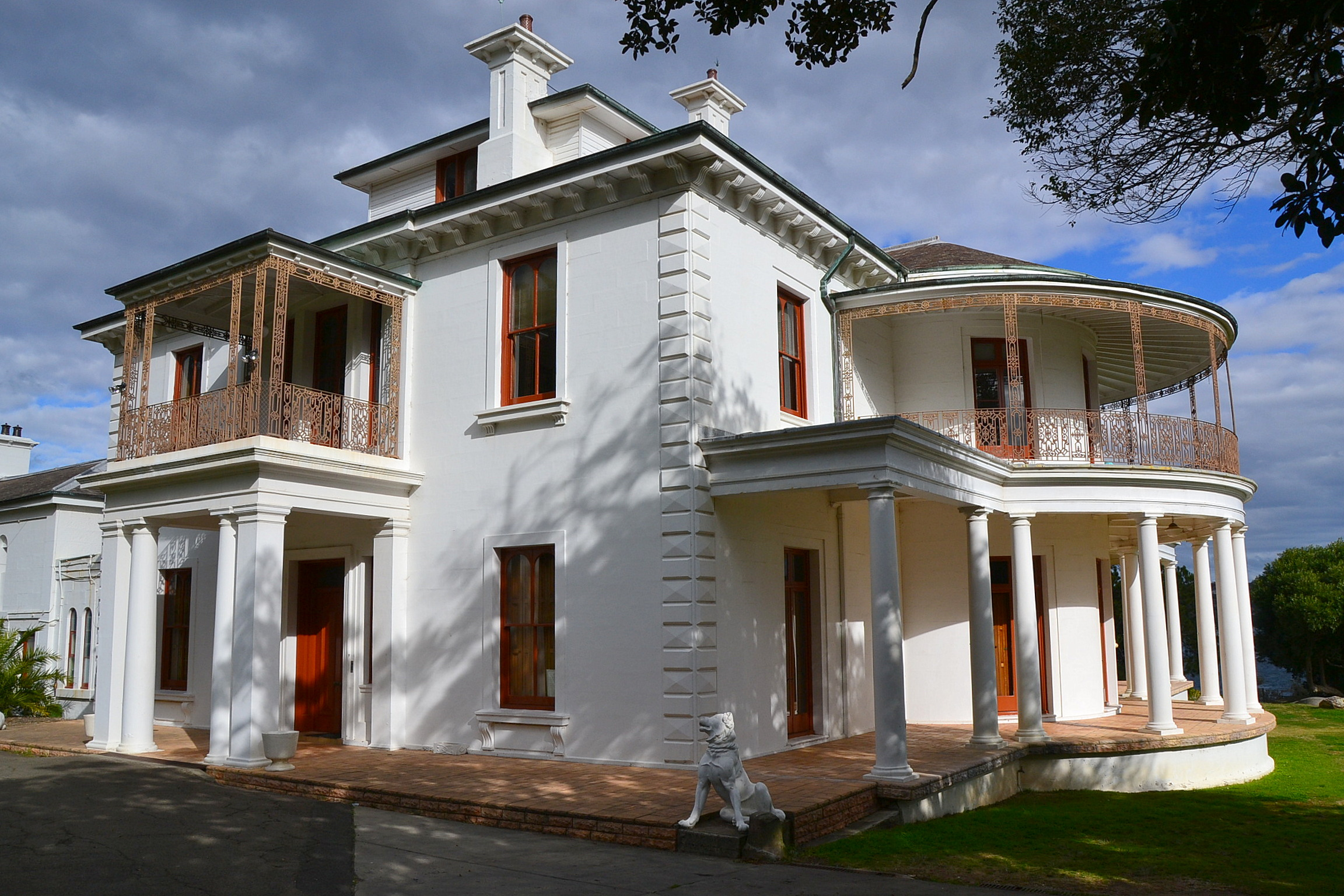
Strickland House in Vaucluse

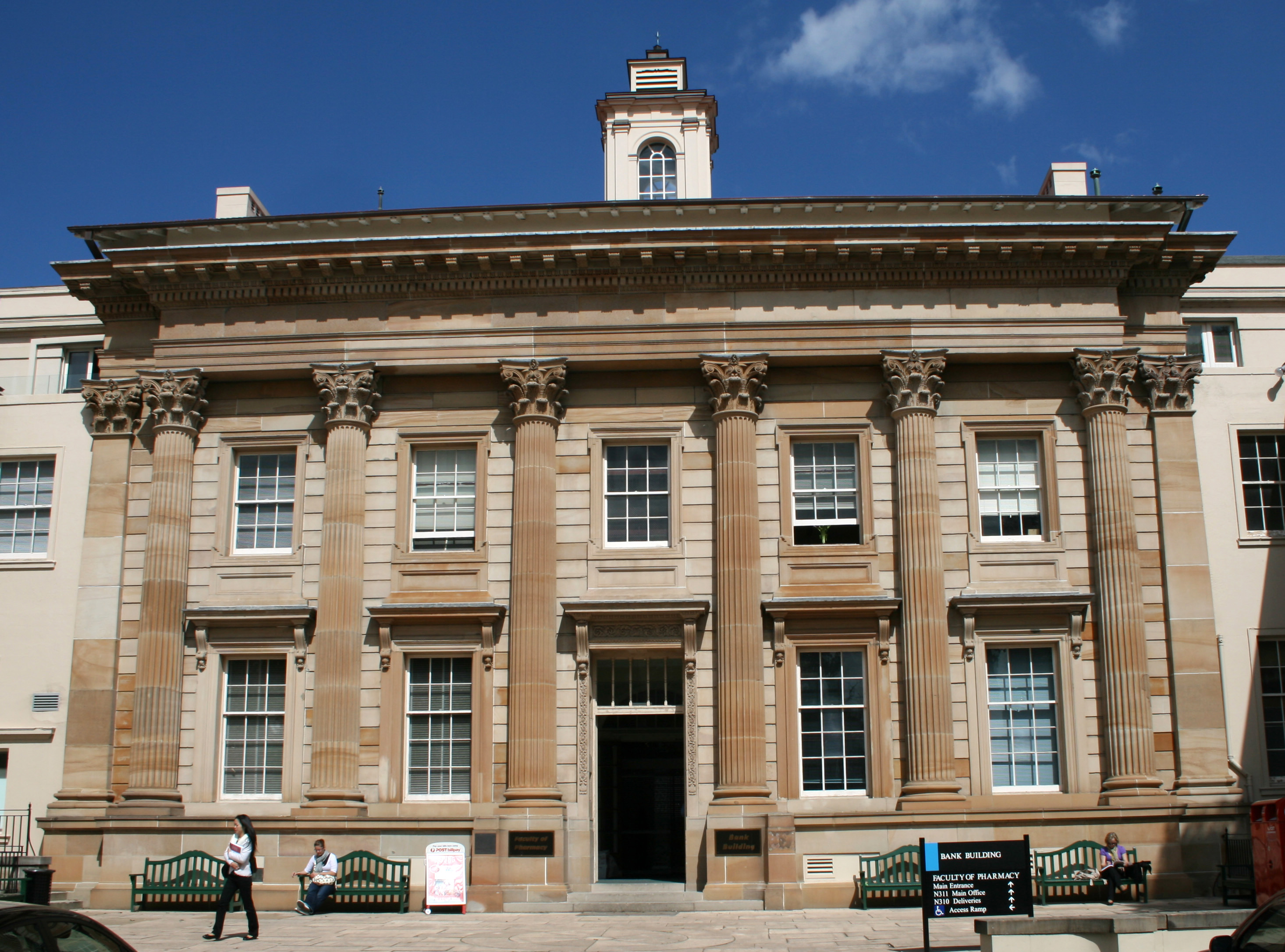
Commercial Banking Company Sydney

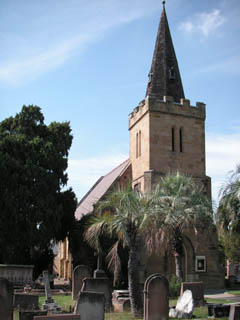
St Thomas Anglican Church in Enfield
