= Charles Windeyer =

Australian magistrate

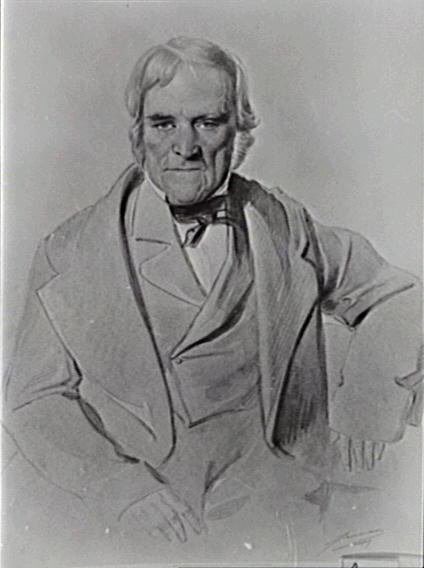

1st Mayor of Sydney
- In office 1842–1842
- Succeeded by: John Hosking

Personal details
- Born: 1 July 1780 Staffordshire, England
- Died: 30 January 1855 (aged 74) Newtown, New South Wales, Australia
- Spouse: Ann Mary Rudd
- Relatives: Richard Windeyer (son); William Charles Windeyer (grandson)

Charles Windeyer (1 July 1780 – 30 January 1855) was an Australian magistrate who held a variety of public positions and was later appointed by Governor George Gipps as the first Mayor of Sydney. He was the father of barrister and politician Richard Windeyer and grandfather of politician and judge William Charles Windeyer.
