= Mary Ann Parker =

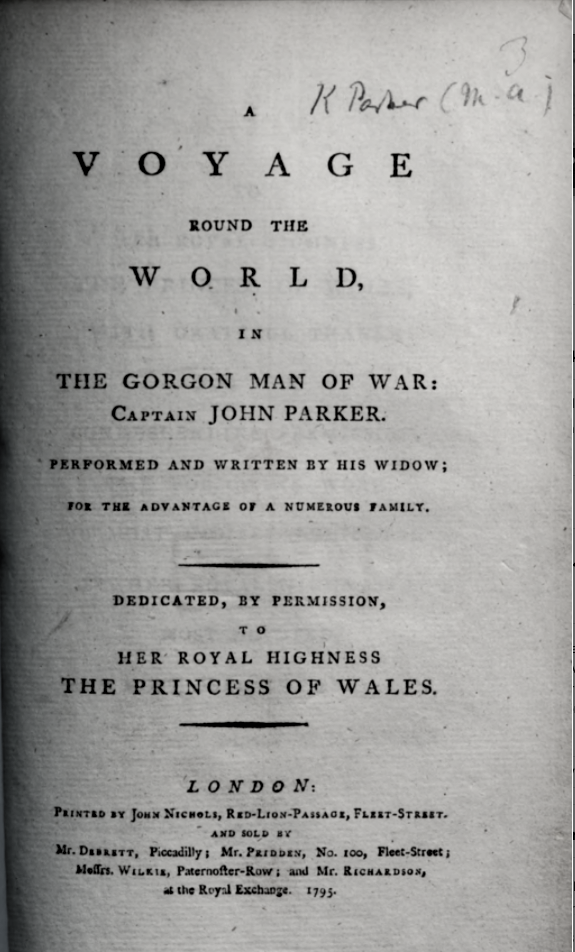
The 1795 book A Voyage Round the World, in the Gorgon Man of War by Mary Ann Parker

Mary Ann Parker (1765/6–1848) was an English traveller and writer whose 1795 book A Voyage Round the World, in the Gorgon Man of War included the first published description by a woman of an Australian colony.

== Travel ==
She travelled to New South Wales and back in 1791–2 on board the frigate HMS Gorgon which was captained by her husband John Parker. The ship was taking desperately-needed supplies, and a few personnel and convicts as well, to the settlement at Port Jackson. The Governor of Norfolk Island, Philip Gidley King, was on board with his new wife, Anna King, the only other woman on the voyage. She was the same age as Mary Ann Parker and an "amiable companion" on the way out.

At that time it was the "longest and most dangerous voyage on earth" but Parker did not emphasise the difficulties of her fifteen-month voyage "to the remotest parts of the globe" and back. Commentators are struck by the cheerful good humour in her writing, especially in the lively descriptions of interludes in Tenerife, the Cape of Good Hope, and Port Jackson itself: meeting new people, exploring new landscapes and local customs, and enjoying fresh food. She does, however, admit to fears when faced with a shipwrecked vessel that should have made the journey they were undertaking, and the threatening though "beautiful and picturesque" ice islands near the Falklands on their return journey.

About a third of A Voyage Round the World is about Port Jackson and its surroundings. Parker was generally positive about the settlement and Governor Phillip's paternalistic rule, though concerned about the death toll amongst transported convicts. She was delighted by the natural environment, and interested in the unfamiliar flora and fauna being brought back to England. Her encounters with aboriginal people have been described as "ambivalent", and elsewhere as "humane and poignantly optimistic". Another writer sees her attitudes to the indigenous population as complex, with an underlying belief in courtesy and humanitarian values.

This book was not only the first description of the first Australian colony by a woman, but the first personal published account of Port Jackson by a private citizen. It has a "refreshing human perspective" according to the Australian Association for Maritime History.

== Publication ==
John Parker died in 1794, leaving his wife in financial difficulty. At the start of the book she stated that her motive for writing was her family's need for money. This sounded like the conventional, self-deprecating 18th century lady's excuse for publishing. "Nothing but the greatest distress” would have led her to do so, she said. The title page read "A Voyage round the World, in the Gorgon Man of War: Captain John Parker. Performed and Written by his Widow; For the Advantage of a Numerous Family".

In 1795, the year after her husband's death, influential acquaintances helped her publish her work. Her neighbour Joseph Budworth persuaded publisher John Nichols to invite subscriptions for the forthcoming book. Budworth, like John Parker, was a veteran of the Siege of Gibraltar and wrote a poem on that subject to drum up interest in A Voyage round the World. Naval officers and supporters were among the many people who responded with advance subscriptions. Nichols wrote a complimentary review in the Gentleman's Magazine, with hints of the exotic curiosities described in the book – rose-apples at the Cape, kangaroo meat at Port Jackson – and ending with the information that Mrs Parker had given birth to a boy just days after getting back home in June 1792.

The book was well-received, but Parker’s money troubles continued. She had to apply for assistance from a charitable fund administered by Budworth, Nichol and others, but eventually lost her house and spent some time in a debtors' prison.

== Personal life ==
Little is known about Mary Ann Parker's childhood. She seems to have been well-educated, and she had been to France, Italy and Spain, where she lived for three years. Her fluency in Spanish and familiarity with Spanish manners were an advantage to her in Tenerife, where she acted as the party's "interpreter general". The names of her mother and physician father are unknown.

The Parkers had two children, a girl and a boy, before the voyage on the Gorgon. They were left at home with their maternal grandmother. Mary Ann said she had chosen to go with her husband despite knowing she would miss her children and her mother, from whom she had never before been separated for as much as a fortnight. The little boy died while she was away. As well as the baby born just after her return from the voyage she had another child in 1794. Two Parker daughters survived although both sons died young.

Parker's life was full of financial troubles in the 1790s and early 1800s, as outlined above. In 1826 Mary Parker travels to Quebec City and describes in a letter to Mrs. White of Hertford England, the fine scenery as her ship travels down the St. Lawrence River to Quebec City, describes Quebec City which while impressive from the river, does not impress her as she visits the city itself. She describes an encampment of Indians, who she describes as wild and savage looking. She apparently traveled there with a "Dr. P" and visits a Mr. and Mrs. Higgins, although that may have been en route. Her letter suggests that she will be staying over the winter and into the next summer. While late August, the temperature at the time in Quebec City is extremely hot at 92-98 degrees. She gives no reason in her letter why she has traveled to Quebec City.10 She died at her son-in-law's London house in 1848.
