= Anna Josepha King =

Australian settler and First Lady of New South Wales

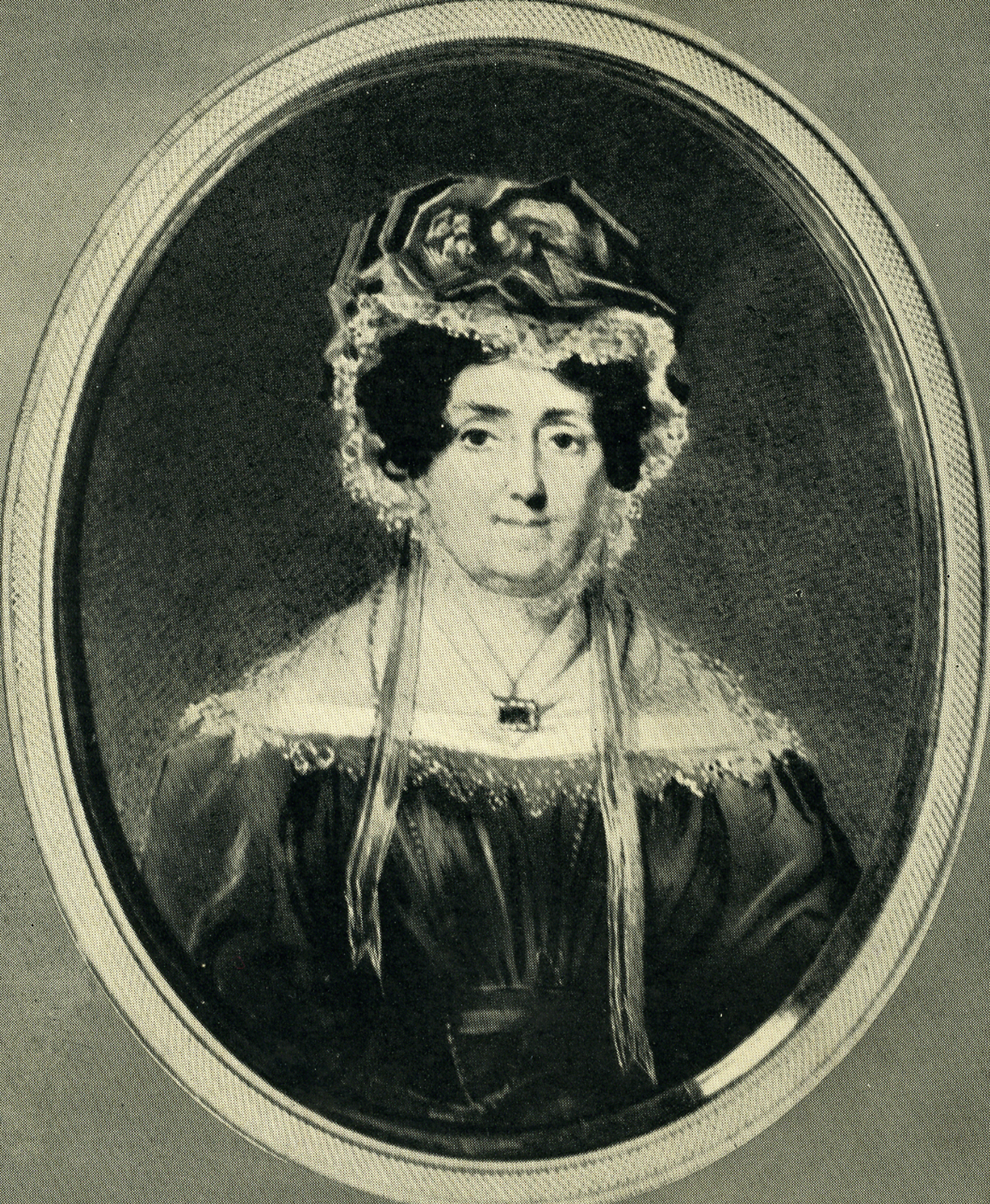
Miniature of Mrs Philip Gidley King

Anna Josepha King (1765–1844) was the wife of Philip Gidley King, the governor of New South Wales from 1800 to 1806. She was the first person to act as spouse of the governor of New South Wales, a territory that was then part of the British Empire and now forms a state of Australia.

== Early life and marriage ==
Anna Josepha Coombe was born in 1765 at Hatherleigh in Devonshire. At the age of 26 she married her first cousin Philip Gidley King, who was a 33-year-old officer in the Royal Navy. He had recently returned from Norfolk Island, where he had been in charge of establishing a penal settlement for two years under the direction of Captain Arthur Phillip.

The marriage took place on 11 March 1791 at St Martin in the Fields, London. King needed to resume his duties as Lieutenant-Governor of Norfolk Island, and just four days later, the newly weds set sail on the frigate Gorgon. Anna King and the captain's wife, Mary Ann Parker, were the only women on the outward journey. Parker wrote an account of the voyage which described Mrs. King as her "amiable companion".

== Norfolk Island ==
The Kings arrived at Norfolk Island in November 1791 and six weeks later Anna gave birth to her first child, Phillip Parker King. Life was not easy. They lived at Government House, a "dilapidated little building twenty four feet by twelve, falling to pieces and unsafe to live in". Not only did Anna have her own baby to attend to, she was also required to care for two illegitimate children of her husband. These two children, named Norfolk and Sydney, were born to Anne Innet, a female convict who was King's mistress during his previous term as Governor on the island.

Life on the island was very isolated. In 1792, there was no communication for nine months with New South Wales, which was their only link with the outside world. News from England, when it did arrive, was often almost 12 months old. Two daughters were born on the island - Anna Maria in 1793 and Utricia in 1795. Utricia died when she was a small child.

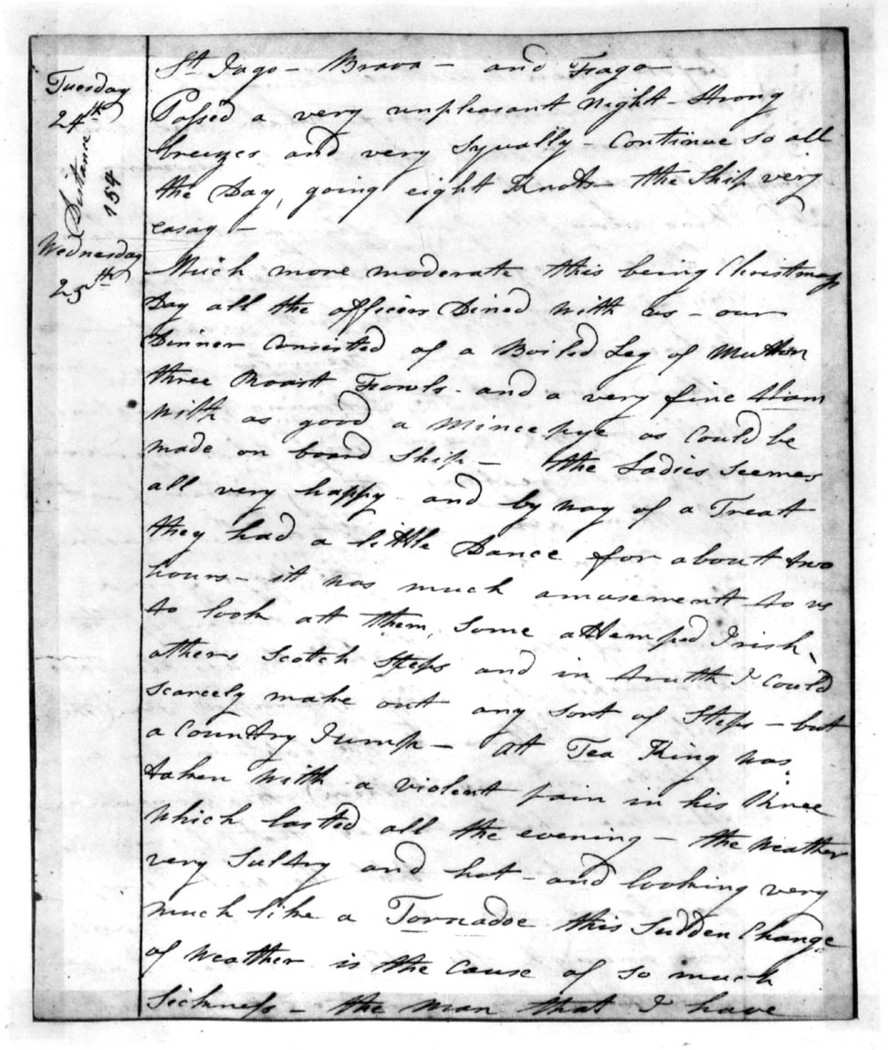
Page from the diary of Anna Josepha King, 1799

Illness plagued both Anna King and her husband during their stay on Norfolk Island. King suffered frequently from gout and other illnesses and in 1795 almost died. The following year he applied for leave to return to England for proper medical advice. In April 1796 the King family sailed aboard the Britannia and then the Contractor for England. During the voyage another daughter, Elizabeth, was born. Over a year after leaving Norfolk Island, the family arrived in England in May 1797.

During the next two years in England King sought to improve his health. He also wanted to find further employment as the Kings were not financially secure. In 1798, it was decided that King would go to New South Wales to succeed John Hunter as governor in the event of his death or absence from the colony.

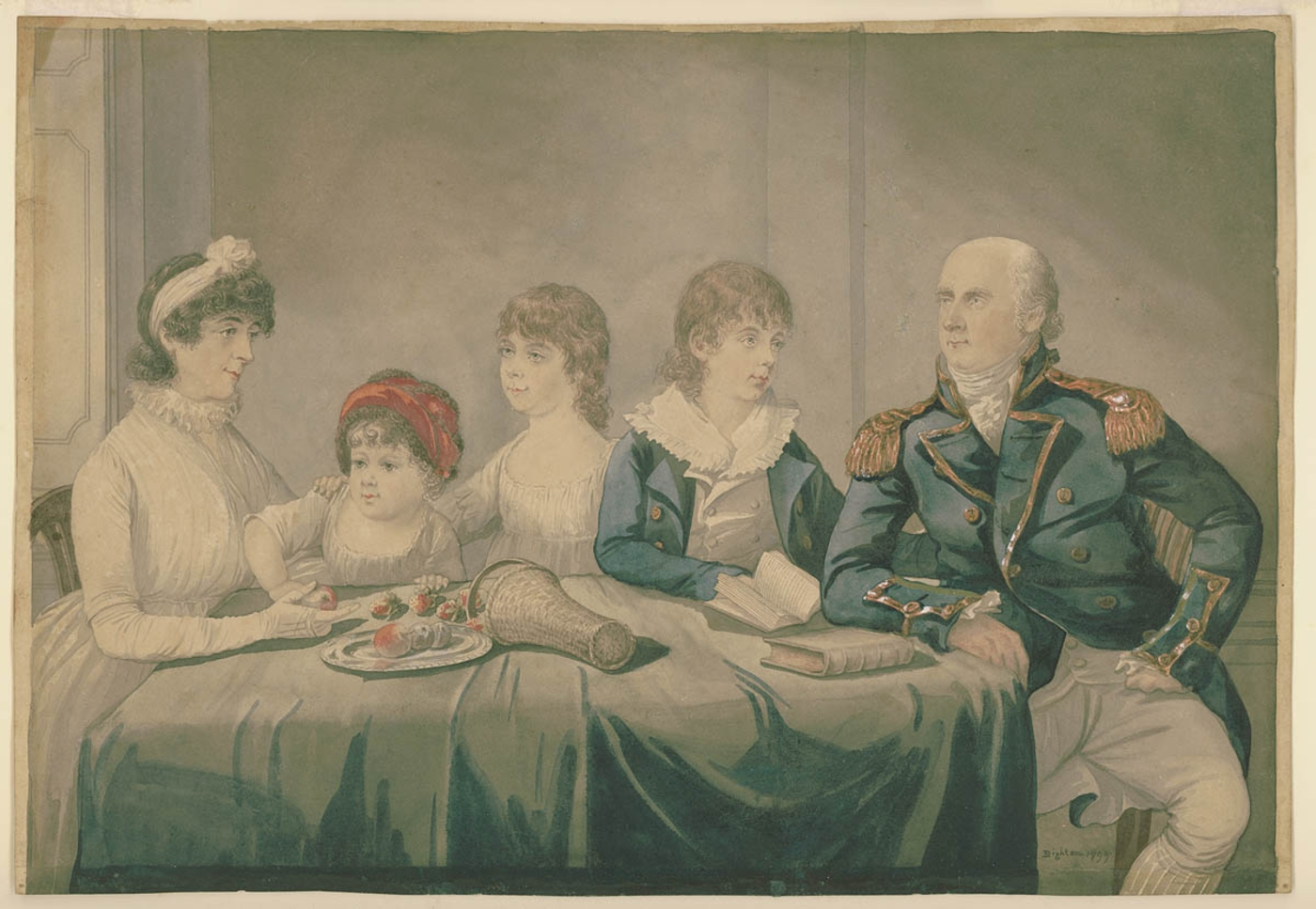
Governor Philip Gidley King, Anna Josepha King, and their children Elizabeth, Anna Maria and Phillip Parker. A 1799 watercolour portrait by Robert Dighton.

In the following year, in August 1799, Anna and her husband with their youngest daughter, Elizabeth, sailed in the ship Speedy for Sydney. Their other two children, Phillip and Anna Maria, remained in England with friends to further their education.

During the voyage Mrs King kept a diary a page of which is pictured. In the diary she describes the hardships they endured and the frequent storms and gales they encountered. On 30 March she said:

"It is out of my power to describe half of the melancholy situation we have been in, occasioned by a dreadful gale of wind which began at 12 oclock yesterday - gradually encreasing more and more - at ½ past one this morning it blew so heavy that the Captain took in all sail, but such as was necessary to keep the ship steady - and brought her too - the sea was dreadful which with the wind kept encreasing - at half past four oclock a sea struck and made a breach over the larboard side of the ship carrying away all before it stripped the larboard side of the railings and the boat cranes and all three water casks that was only put there the day before of course all went - every body’s cabin suffered by this dreadful sea. It burst down upon me, and poor Elizabeth, and completely wetted us through bed and all - and the bottom part of the cabin was shoe deep with water - for my part I thought the decks was falling in upon us - and that we was in great danger." She concludes her diary as follows. "We however arrived safe - to Port Jackson on the 13th of April- and was very happy - to put my foot once more on dry land - and I hope never to take another voyage after arriving again in England - for I am quite sick of the seas."

== Governor's Wife in New South Wales ==
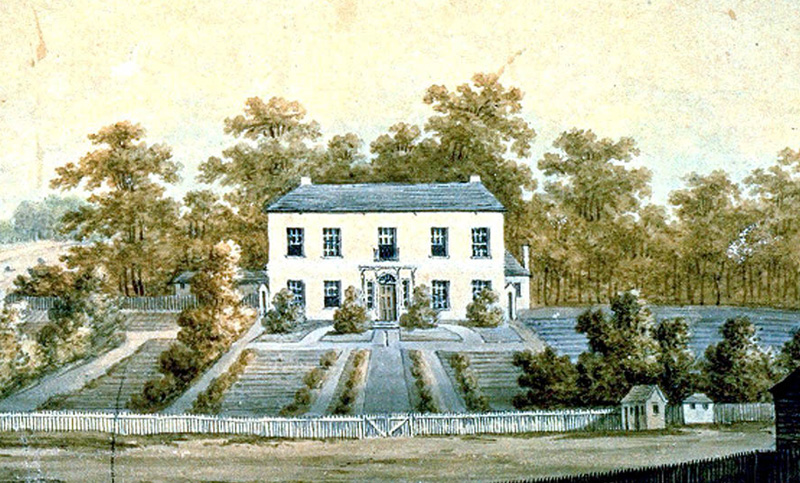
Government House Parramatta, 1805. Painting by George William Evans

The journey took five months. The Kings arrived at Port Jackson in April 1800. Hunter still occupied Government House so at first they stayed with friends. King did not become governor until five months later when Hunter left for England. He saw his new role as a reformist and his first task was to break the control of monopolist traders in the colony and the traffickers in liquor.

The Kings moved into Government House at Parramatta when Hunter departed. Mrs King was the first Governor's wife in New South Wales, as Governor Phillip had left his wife in England and Governor Hunter was unmarried.

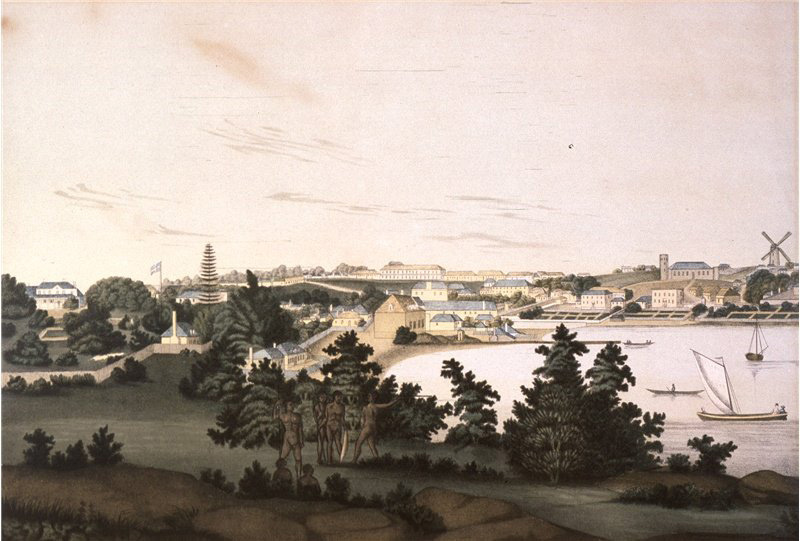
View of Sydney from the east side of the Cove, 1810. Painting by John Eyre

One of first tasks undertaken by Governor King was to establish an institution for orphan children. Anna King took a particular interest in this and was one of the six members of the Committee appointed to set up the building. It was opened in 1801 and although it was officially called The Female Orphan Institution, informally it was known as Mrs King's Orphanage. (See Foundling hospital for context.) It is shown in the picture (left). It is the central red brick building.

From 1800 until 1806 Anna played the part of Governor's wife, being the hostess and friend to those who were influential. In 1805 she gave birth to another daughter, Mary, giving her two daughters living with her in Sydney (Elizabeth and Mary) and one daughter Anna Maria and one son Phillip Parker King who were still at school in England. However, by 1806 King's health deteriorated and at his request he was replaced by a naval officer, William Bligh. Soon after his arrival, Bligh made a grant of 790 acres (3.2 km^{2}) of land to Anna. The land was situated at the junction of Rope's Creek and South Creek, near what later became the suburb of Rooty Hill.

== Return to England ==
In February 1807 the King family left New South Wales to return to England. They arrived in November 1807 and soon after King became ill once more mainly with gout. Although he was only 49 he realised he could no longer work and applied for a pension. Unfortunately King died in September 1808 before the pension was granted and Anna was left in difficult financial circumstances. She sought financial assistance from the Secretary of State and eventually was granted a small life annuity. Her land in NSW was an additional source of income. Since her departure from Sydney, it had become quite productive as in 1810 Governor Macquarie made the following comment in a report.

"to Mrs. King's Farm on the Right Bank of the South Creek; where we halted for a short while to look at her fine numerous Herds of Horned Cattle, of which she has upwards of 700 Head of all descriptions. — Her agent Mr. Hassall was here for the purpose of shewing them to us, and we found them in very high condition."

During the time that Anna was in England between 1807 and 1832 all of her children married. In 1812, Anna Maria married Hannibal Hawkins Macarthur who had already settled in NSW but was staying in London for a short visit. The couple returned to NSW after their marriage and resided at Hannibal's recently purchased farm near Parramatta called "The Vineyard". In 1817 Phillip married Harriet Lethbridge and went to live in Sydney for some years but returned in 1822. In 1826 Mary married the brother of Harriet, Robert Copeland Lethbridge and they too decided to emigrate to NSW. Harriet decided to accompany them with her children alone as Phillip had been ordered to command a ship for several years. Elizabeth married Charles Runciman a well known London artist soon after this and was the only one of Anna's children to remain in England.

== Back to Australia ==
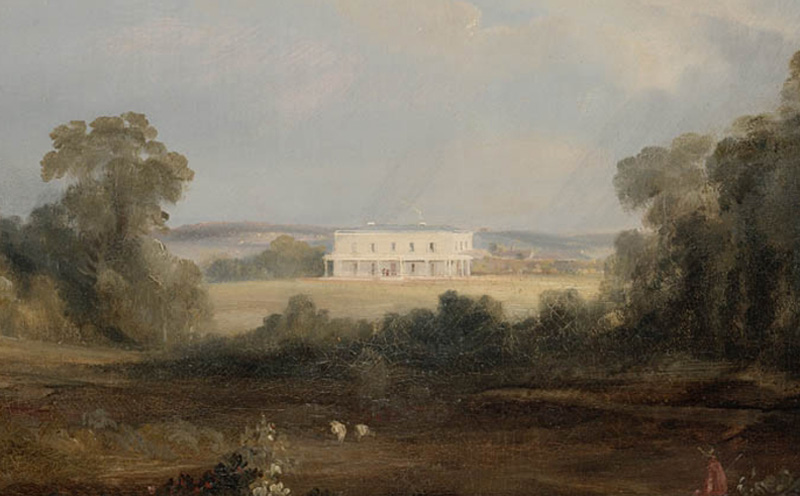
The Vineyard, Parramatta, 1840. Painting by Conrad Martens

In 1832 her son Phillip decided to retire from the Royal Navy and return to NSW to reunite with his wife Harriet. Anna decided to accompany him and was met at the dock in Sydney by her son in law Hannibal Macarthur and taken to their home "The Vineyard" to live She remained here for the rest of her life.

One of her interests was the building of a local church and in 1837 her son Phillip acquired 2 acres (8,100 m^{2}) of land and donated it so that St Mary Magdalene Anglican Church could be built. It was designed by Francis Crick and was completed in 1840. When Anna died in 1844 she was buried here (see picture below). In 1988 the descendants of the Kings arranged for the tombstone of her husband Philip Gidley King to be brought to Australia where it was placed in an enclosure next to Anna's grave

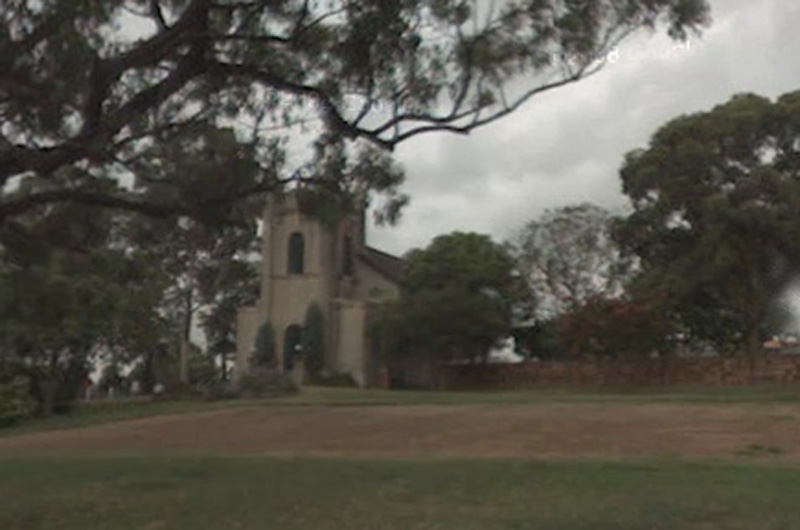
St Mary Magdalene Anglican Church near Penrith

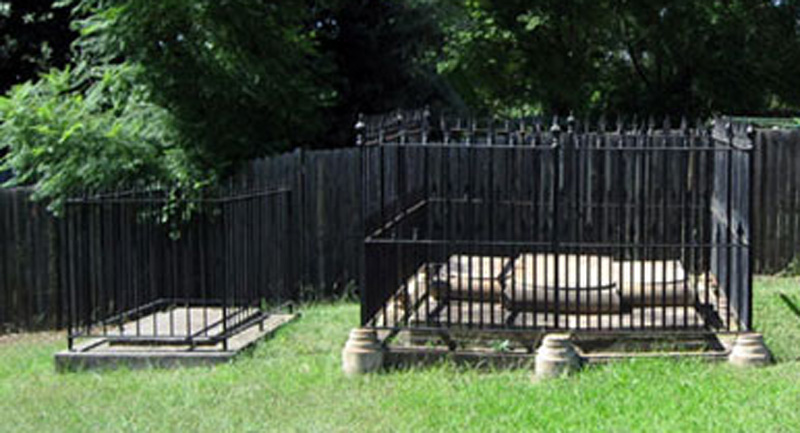
Grave of Anna Josepha King at St Mary Magdalene
Church, Penrith is in the middle of the right enclosure.
The tombstone (but not the remains) of her husband Philip Gidley King is in the left enclosure
