= Hannibal Hawkins Macarthur =

Australian politician

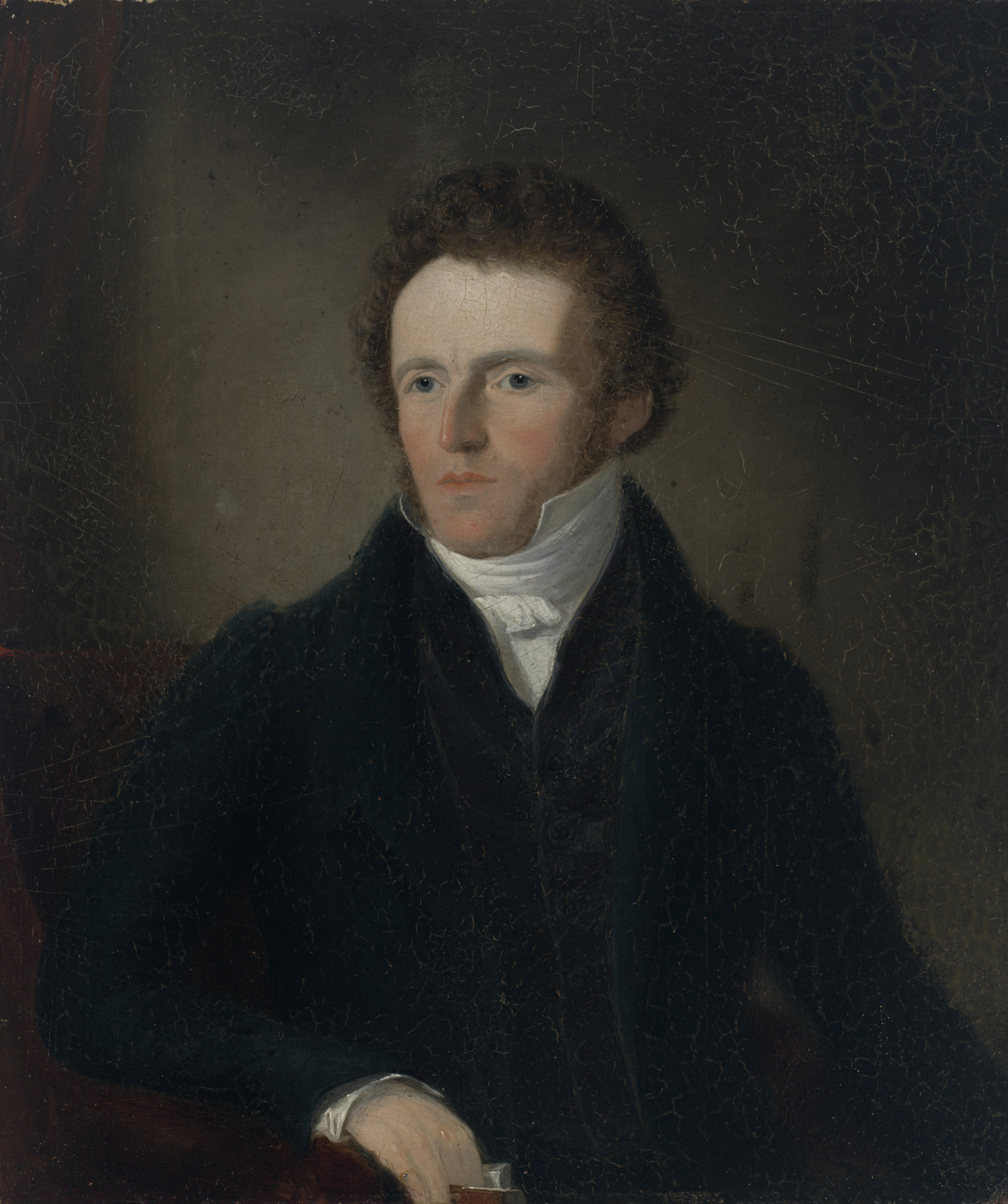
- Portrait of Hannibal Hawkins Macarthur as a young man Mitchell Library, State Library of New South Wales: ML 145.
- Born: 16 January 1788; Plymouth, Devonshire, England
- Died: 21 October 1861 (aged 73); Norwood, London, England
- Resting place: West Norwood Cemetery, London, England
- Spouse: Anna Maria King

Hannibal Hawkins Macarthur (16 January 1788 – 21 October 1861) was an Australian colonist, politician, businessman and wool pioneer. The nephew of John Macarthur and son-in-law of former New South Wales governor, Philip Gidley King, he was well-connected in the early colony of New South Wales.

== First sojourn in New South Wales ==
Hannibal Hawkins Macarthur was born on 16 January 1788 at Plymouth, Devonshire, England. His father, James Macarthur, a draper, was the elder brother of John Macarthur. When his uncle John returned to New South Wales after resigning his commission to avoid being posted to Norfolk Island, he persuaded Hannibal to join him. Hannibal arrived at Sydney on 9 June 1805.

He left New South Wales in 1808 for England by way of China and the Philippines, where he unsuccessfully traded sandalwood for his uncle John, arriving home in 1810.

== Return to New South Wales ==
Hannibal arrived back in Sydney in August 1812 per his uncle's ship, the Isabella with a cargo for sale in the colony and to help his uncle's wife, Elizabeth Macarthur in John's absence.

He gained recognition while caring for his uncle's merino sheep during his absences, and by 1817 was able secure land for his own merino flocks, and run a trading store. He actively participated in the intrigues of the time and through his connections became prominent in the community and local politics. He joined the New South Wales Legislative Council in 1830, representing the conservatives in the nominated, and then part-elected Council for Parramatta until 1848.

He also had a directorship in the newly created Bank of Australia, but at its collapse in 1843 Macarthur became insolvent, lost most of his property, and relocated to Ipswich, in the Moreton Bay District of the Colony of New South Wales (later the Colony of Queensland), where he was given a commission as police magistrate from 1 January 1852.

== Family ==
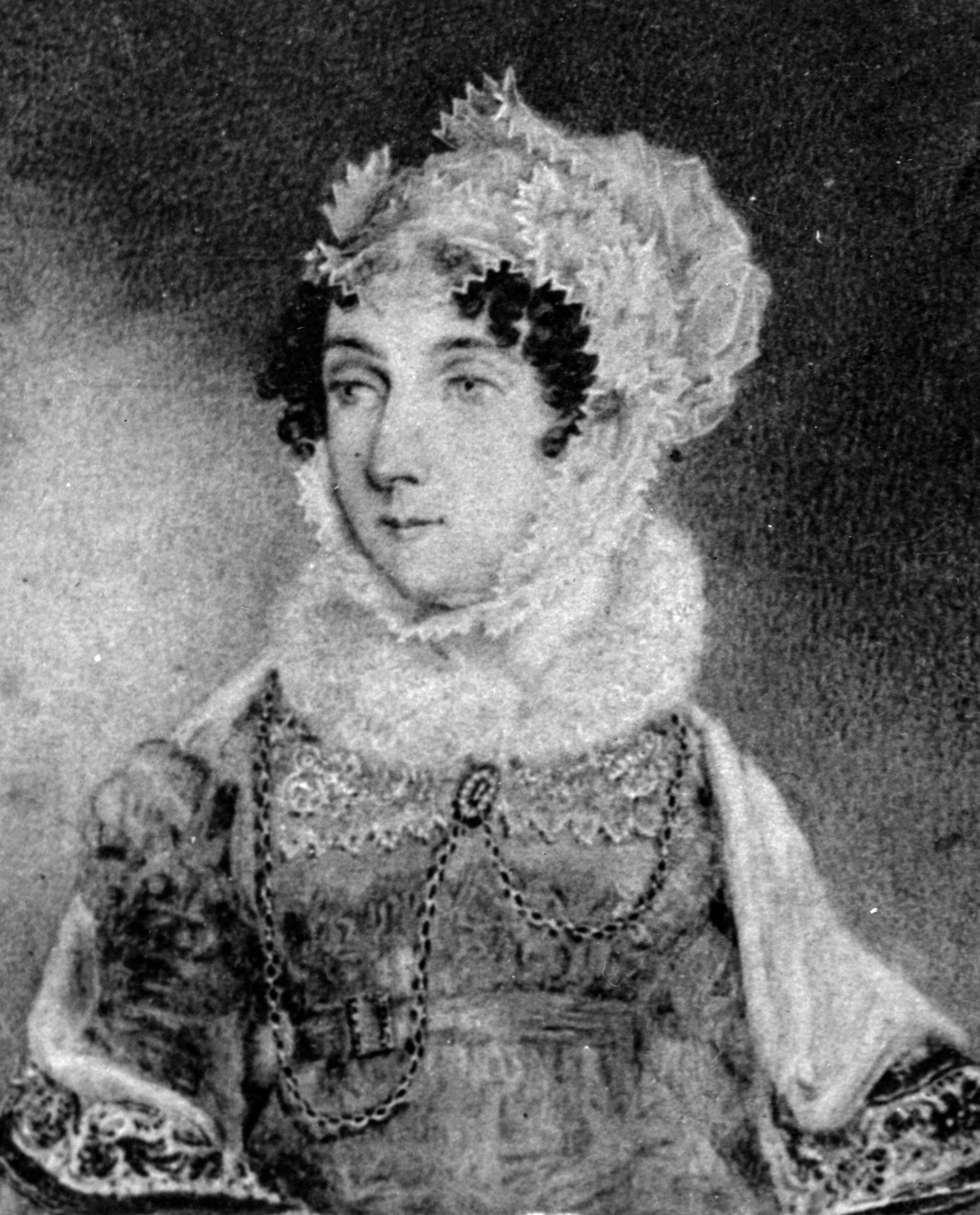
His wife, Anna Maria Macarthur, 1826

In 1812 at St Marylebow, London, Hannibal Macarthur married Anna Maria King. Anna was born on 22 April 1793 on Norfolk Island, the daughter of Philip Gidley King, later governor of New South Wales, and his wife Anna Josepha (née Coombe).

The couple had at least four daughters. One, Elizabeth (17 May 1815 – 27 November 1899), married Philip Gidley King, son of Philip Parker King. Another, Anna (7 December 1816 – 23 June 1852), married John Clements Wickham. A third, Catherine (14 June 1818 – 10 April 1894) married Patrick Leslie. A fourth, Emmeline (10 July 1828 – 23 December 1911), married George Farquhar Leslie (brother to Patrick Leslie). A son, John Alexander (January 1827 - June 23, 1904), married Clara Pollard and after her death, Mary Goodrich.

== Later years and death ==
His wife Anna died on 1 September 1852 at Woodend, Ipswich and was buried in the Ipswich General Cemetery. After her death, Hannibal Macarthur returned to England, where he died at Norwood on 21 October 1861, and is buried at West Norwood Cemetery.

His wife Anna was commemorated with a baptismal font bowl and plaque at St Pauls Anglican Church at Ipswich by Queensland Women's Historical Association, unveiled on 25 February 1966 by Sir Henry Abel Smith, Governor of Queensland.
