= John Hosking (politician) =

Australian politician and merchant

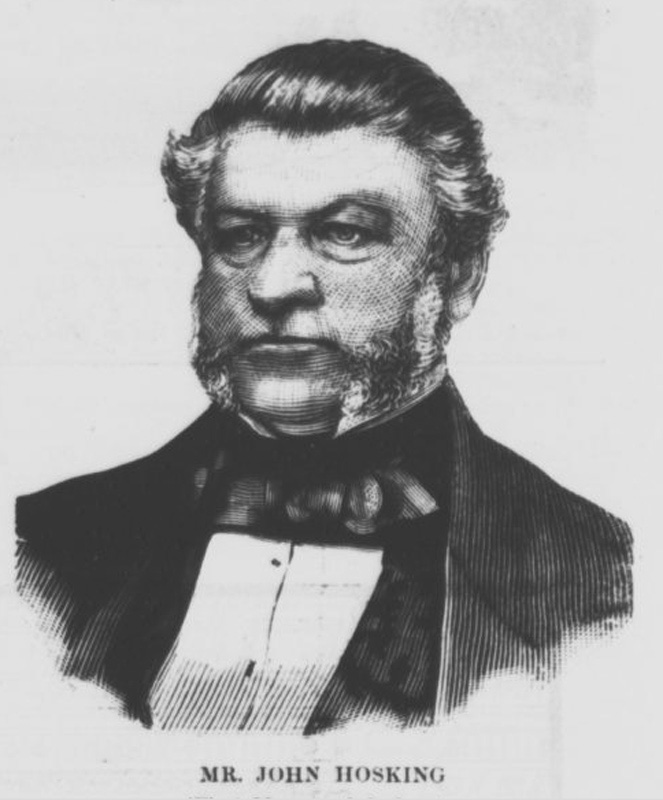
John Hosking portrait

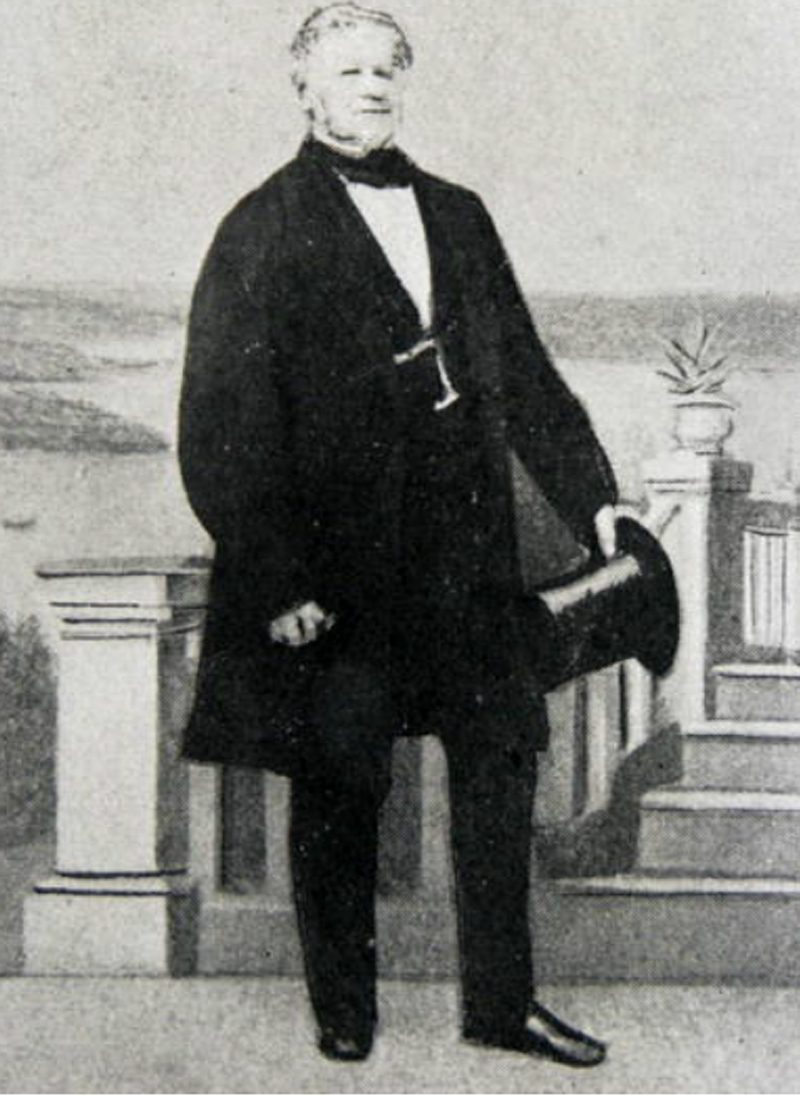
John Hosking, c. 1860

John Hosking (17 April 1805 (Note: Hosking's birth date has also been given as simply 1806 by the Australian Dictionary of Biography and the Dictionary of Sydney.) – 9 September 1882) was a politician, merchant and magistrate in the colony of New South Wales. He was the first elected mayor of Sydney, serving from 1842 to 1843. (Note: The first mayor of Sydney, Charles Windeyer, was appointed by Governor George Gipps.)

== Biography ==
Born in England, Hosking's precise birthplace has been reported as either London, Middlesex, or South Brent, Devon. His parents were Ann Elizabeth (née Mann) and John Hosking. His family emigrated to Sydney, New South Wales, in 1809, before heading back to England ten years later. Hosking returned to Sydney in 1825.

After a successful campaign in Sydney's first municipal elections, the council selected Hosking to be an alderman and the mayor of Sydney. He was appointed a magistrate in 1842. His public office career ended in 1843 when he resigned as mayor due to bankruptcy. Hosking was also involved in real estate and activities relating to the Methodist Church. From 1858 to 1876, he was the first owner of the heritage-listed Strickland House in Vaucluse.

His insolvency in September 1843, and the insolvency of his company Hughes & Hosking, were among the major events of the economic depression of the 1840s. The amount—£122,000—owed to the Bank of Australia, caused that bank to fail. Hosking never considered himself to be insolvent. He claimed in 1845, that his debts and liabilities—an astronomical sum, for the time, of £277,800—were less than his assets by £49,800. The insolvency triggered a number of legal disputes, some of which continued into the 1850s.

Hosking was married to Martha Foxlowe Terry—daughter of Samuel Terry and Rosetta Terry, and an independently-wealthy landowner in her own right—from 1829 until her death in 1877. The couple had three daughters. His business partner, in the firm of Hughes & Hosking, was his father-in-law's nephew, John Terry Hughes, who was married to one of Samuel Terry's step-daughters. He died at Mount Pleasant, Penrith, on 9 September 1882.

== See also ==
- Hoskinstown, New South Wales

== Notes ==
Civic offices
Preceded by Charles Windeyer	Mayor of Sydney; 1842–1843	Succeeded by James Robert Wilshire
