= Spouse of the governor of New South Wales =

The viceregal consort of New South Wales is the spouse of the serving governor of New South Wales. The viceregal consort assists the viceroy with ceremonial and charitable work, accompanys them to official state occasions, and undertakes philanthropic work of their own. This individual is addressed as His or Her Excellency while their spouse is in office, and is often made ex officio a Knight or Dame of Justice of the Most Venerable Order of the Hospital of Saint John of Jerusalem.

== List of viceregal consorts of the governor of New South Wales ==
Governor	Term start	Term end	Spouse	Born	Died	Notes
Captain Arthur Phillip	7 February 1788	10 December 1792	Estranged			
Captain John Hunter	11 September 1795	27 September 1800	None			
Captain Philip Gidley King	28 September 1800	12 August 1806	Anna Josepha King	1765	1844	Anna Josepha Coombe was King's first cousin.
Captain William Bligh	13 August 1806	26 January 1808	Elizabeth Bligh	1754	15 April 1815	Elizabeth Bligh (née Betham) was the second daughter of Richard Betham LL.D., who was Collector of Customs and Water Bailiff at Douglas on the Isle of Man.
Major-General Lachlan Macquarie	1 January 1810	1 December 1821	Elizabeth Macquarie	1778	11 March 1835	Born Elizabeth Henrietta Campbell, she was the youngest daughter of John Campbell of Airds, Scotland and was a distant cousin of Macquarie's.
Sir Thomas Brisbane, Bt.	1 December 1821	1 December 1825	Anna Marie Makdougall-Brisbane, Lady Brisbane			She was the daughter of Sir Henry Hay-Makdougall, 4th Baronet and Isabella Douglas, who was the daughter of Sir James Douglas, 1st Baronet.
Sir Ralph Darling	19 December 1825	21 October 1831	Eliza Darling, Lady Darling	10 November 1798	3 September 1868	Born Eliza Dumaresq.
Sir Richard Bourke	3 December 1831	5 December 1837	Elizabeth Jane Bourke, Lady Bourke		7 May 1832	Lady Bourke died at Government House, Parramatta, not long after arriving in Sydney.
Sir George Gipps	5 October 1837	2 August 1846	Elizabeth Gipps, Lady Gipps	1805	11 July 1874	Born Elizabeth Ramsay.
Sir Charles FitzRoy	3 August 1846	28 January 1855	Mary FitzRoy, Lady FitzRoy	1792	7 December 1847	Lady FitzRoy (née Lennox) was the daughter of Charles Lennox, 4th Duke of Richmond and Charlotte Lennox, Duchess of Richmond.
Sir William Denison	20 January 1855	22 January 1861	Caroline Denison, Lady Denison		1899	Lady Denison (née Hornby) was the daughter of Sir Phipps Hornby and was appointed to the Order of the Crown of India (CI) in 1878 for her and her husband's services in Madras.
Sir John Young, Bt.	16 May 1861	24 December 1867	Adelaide Young, Lady Young		19 July 1895	Lady Adelaide Annabella Tuite Young (née Dalton) later became Baroness Lisgar. Was the daughter of the Marchioness of Headfort by her first marriage.
4th Earl Belmore	8 January 1868	21 February 1872	Anne Lowry-Corry, Countess Belmore	22 December 1841	5 October 1919	Anne Elizabeth Honoria Lowry-Corry (née Gladstone) was the daughter of John Neilson Gladstone and the niece of William Ewart Gladstone, Prime Minister of the United Kingdom.
Sir Hercules Robinson	3 June 1872	19 March 1879	Nea Robinson, Lady Robinson		13 January 1904	Lady Robinson was born The Hon. Nea Arthur Ada Rose d'Amour Annesley, fifth daughter of the tenth Viscount Valentia in 1846. Lady Robinson (later to become Baroness Rosmead) was described as "a majestic-looking woman", "fond of gaiety and society".
Lord Augustus Loftus	4 August 1879	9 November 1885	Emma Loftus, Lady Loftus		1 January 1902	Born Emma Maria Greville.
3rd Baron Carrington	12 December 1885	3 November 1890	Cecilia Carington, Baroness Carrington	15 June 1856	6 October 1934	Born The Hon. Cecilia Margaret Harbord, daughter of the 5th Baron Suffield. Became Countess Carrington (1895) and Marchioness of Lincolnshire (1912). The Sydney suburb of Harbord was named after her.
7th Earl of Jersey	15 January 1891	2 March 1893	Margaret Child-Villiers, Countess of Jersey	29 October 1849	22 May 1945	Born Hon. Margaret Elizabeth Leigh, daughter of 2nd Baron Leigh. The Countess of Jersey was the founding president of the Victoria League and was known as an opponent of women's suffrage. She was appointed a Dame Commander of the Order of the British Empire (DBE) in 1927.
Sir Robert Duff	29 May 1893	15 March 1895	Louisa Duff, Lady Duff	1846	18 January 1924	Born Louisa Scott, the daughter of Sir William Scott, 6th Baronet.
2nd Viscount Hampden	21 November 1895	5 March 1899	Susan Brand, Viscountess Hampden	29 July 1846	16 October 1909	Born Susan Henrietta Cavendish, was the daughter of Lord George Cavendish.
7th Earl Beauchamp	18 May 1899	30 April 1901	Lettice Lygon, Countess Beauchamp	25 December 1876	28 July 1936	Born Lady Lettice Mary Elizabeth Grosvenor, daughter of Victor Grosvenor, Earl Grosvenor and granddaughter of Hugh Grosvenor, 1st Duke of Westminster.
Admiral Sir Harry Rawson	27 May 1902	27 May 1909	Florence Rawson, Lady Rawson		12 December 1905	Born Florence Alice Stewart Shaw.
1st Viscount Chelmsford	28 May 1909	11 March 1913	Frances Thesiger, Baroness Chelmsford	22 March 1869	24 September 1957	Born the Hon. Frances Charlotte Guest, daughter of Ivor Guest, 1st Baron Wimborne, and Lady Cornelia Henrietta Maria Spencer-Churchill. Was made a Dame Grand Cross, Order of the British Empire (GBE) in 1917 and was also invested with the Imperial Order of the Crown of India (CI).
Sir 1st Baron Strickland	14 March 1913	27 October 1917	Edeline Strickland, Lady Strickland, Contessa della Catena	10 September 1870	15 December 1918	Born Lady Edeline Sackville, daughter of the 7th Earl De La Warr and the Hon. Constance Mary Elizabeth Cochrane-Wishart-Baillie, daughter of Lord Lamington. She was invested as a Lady of Justice of Order of St. John of Jerusalem (LJStJ).
Sir Walter Davidson	18 February 1918	4 September 1923	Margaret Davidson, Lady Davidson	21 April 1871	14 October 1964	Born Margaret Agnes Feilding, she was the daughter of General Hon. Sir Percy Robert Basil Feilding. In 1918 she was named Dame Commander of the Order of the British Empire (DBE) for her work with the Red Cross Society and the Scouting and Girl Guides in New South Wales. Also a Dame of Grace of the Order of St. John of Jerusalem (DStJ).
Admiral Sir Dudley de Chair	28 February 1924	7 April 1930	Enid de Chair, Lady de Chair	1878	1965	Born Enid Struben, was an Artist and art patron. Her patronage of NSW modern art "puts her among its earliest supporters in Australia".
Air Vice-Marshal Sir Philip Game	29 May 1930	15 January 1935	Gwendolen Game, Lady Game		1972	Born Gwendolen Margaret Hughes-Gibb.
1st Baron Gowrie	21 February 1935	22 January 1936	Zara Hore-Ruthven, Baroness Gowrie	20 January 1879	19 July 1965	Lady Gowrie was involved in the provision of child care, and the Lady Gowrie Child Centres were named in her honour. She later became Countess of Gowrie. From the 1930s she was instrumental in advancing the career of the opera singer Dame Joan Hammond, whose final public performance was at Lady Gowrie's funeral.
Admiral Sir David Murray Anderson	6 August 1936	30 October 1936	Edith Anderson, Lady Anderson	1883	5 September 1958	Born Edith Muriel Teschemaker in New Zealand. Lady Anderson carried out many of her husband's duties while he was seriously ill leading up to his premature death in office. She was appointed Dame Commander of the Order of the British Empire (DBE) on 11 May 1937, on the recommendation of the Premier, for public service in New South Wales.
2nd Baron Wakehurst	8 April 1937	8 January 1946	Margaret Loder, Baroness Wakehurst	4 November 1899	19 August 1994	Born Margaret Tennant, the daughter of prominent Liberal politician and businessman, Sir Charles Tennant, 1st Baronet and her half-sister was Margot Asquith, Countess of Oxford and Asquith. Lady Wakehurst was appointed a Dame Commander of the Order of the British Empire (DBE) in 1965. She was also a Dame of the Order of St John of Jerusalem (DStJ) from 1960 and received an honorary Doctor of Laws from Queen's University, Belfast (1957).
Lieutenant General Sir John Northcott	1 August 1946	31 July 1957	Winifred Northcott, Lady Northcott		15 August 1974	Born Winifred Mary Paton.
Lieutenant General Sir Eric Woodward	1 August 1957	1 August 1965	Amy Woodward, Lady Woodward	1904	1984	Born Amy Weller.
Sir Roden Cutler	20 January 1966	19 January 1981	Helen Cutler, Lady Cutler AC	5 May 1923	8 November 1990	Born Helen Gray Annetta Morris, Lady Cutler was educated at Sydney Church of England Girls' Grammar School and served with the Australian Women's Army Service from 1942 to 1946. Made a Companion of the Order of Australia (AC) in 1980 and had previously been awarded Dame of the Order of St John of Jerusalem (1977) and Commander of the Order of St John of Jerusalem (1965).
Air Marshal Sir James Rowland	20 January 1981	20 January 1989	Faye Rowland, Lady Rowland		16 December 2011	Born Faye Alison Doughton.
Rear Admiral Sir David Martin	21 January 1989	7 August 1990	Suzanne Martin, Lady Martin		Living	Born Suzanne Millear, she was awarded the Medal of the Order of Australia (OAM) in the Queen's Birthday 2011 Honours for service to youth through the Sir David Martin Foundation.
Rear Admiral Peter Sinclair	8 August 1990	29 February 1996	Shirley Sinclair		Living	Born Shirley McLellan, awarded a Dame of the Order of St John of Jerusalem (DStJ).
Hon. Gordon Samuels	1 March 1996	28 February 2001	Jacqueline Samuels	8 September 1927	Living	Born Jacqueline Kott, Jacqueline Samuels had a long career as an actor and was a member of the board of the National Institute of Dramatic Art (1976–1985). In 1994 she was awarded an honorary Doctor of the University of New South Wales in honour of her service to the university, as well as having the new "Samuels Building" jointly named after her.
Dame Marie Bashir	1 March 2001	1 October 2014	Sir Nicholas Shehadie AC, OBE	15 November 1926	11 February 2018	Shehadie was a former Lord Mayor of Sydney (1973–1975) and a former national representative rugby union captain, who made thirty career Test appearances (1947–1958). He was an inductee into both the Australian Rugby Union Hall of Fame and the IRB Hall of Fame.
General David Hurley	2 October 2014	1 May 2019	Linda Hurley		Living	Born Linda McMartin.
Margaret Beazley	2 May 2019	Incumbent	Dennis Wilson		Living	

== See also ==
- Spouse of the governor-general of Australia
