= Bomera and Tarana =

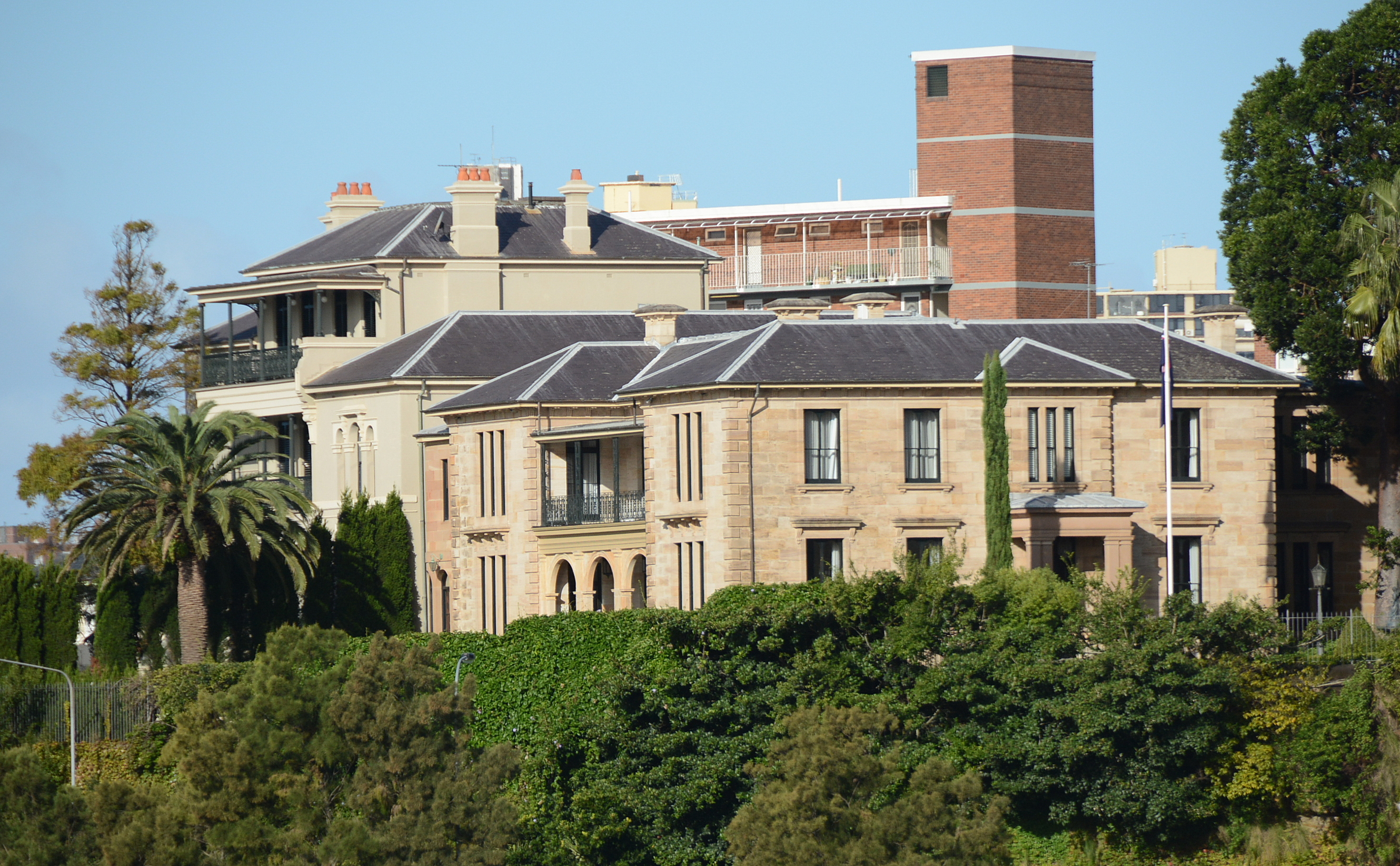
- Bomera and Tarana, pictured in 2016

- Location within Sydney Location within Australia
- 33.8658°S 151.2247°E
- Location: 1 Wylde Street, Potts Point, Sydney, New South Wales, Australia

History
- Built: 1856–1889

Site notes
- Architects: John Frederick Hilly (Bomera; 1856); Edward H. Buchanan; Sheerin & Hennessy (3rd storey, 1907) (Tarana; 1889)

New South Wales Heritage Register
- Official name: Bomera & Tarana; Boomera; Taranah
- Type: state heritage (built)
- Designated: 23 June 2000
- Reference no.: 1400
- Type: Mansion
- Category: Residential buildings (private)
- Builders: John Alexander Oag (Tarana); Wheelwright & Alderson (Tarana; 1907)

Bomera and Tarana are two jointly heritage-listed residences at 1 Wylde Street in the inner city Sydney suburb of Potts Point, New South Wales, Australia. Bomera was designed by John Frederick Hilly and built in 1856 with alterations by Sheerin & Hennessy and built by Wheelwright & Alderson c. 1902. Tarana was designed by Edward H. Buchanan and built by John Alexander Oag in 1889, with additions including a third storey designed by Sheerin & Hennessy in 1907. The houses are also known as Boomera and Taranah. The property was added to the New South Wales State Heritage Register on 23 June 2000.

== History ==
=== Aboriginal history ===
The "Eora people" was the name given to the coastal Aborigines around Sydney. Central Sydney is therefore often referred to as "Eora country". Within the City of Sydney local government area, the traditional owners are the Cadigal and Wangal bands of the Eora. There is no written record of the name of the language spoken and currently there are debates as whether the coastal peoples spoke a separate language "Eora" or whether this was actually a dialect of the Dharug language. Remnant bushland in places like Blackwattle Bay retain elements of traditional plant, bird and animal life, including fish and rock oysters.

During conflict in the British settlement of the Sydney region, the Cadigal and Wangal people were decimated but there are descendants still living in Sydney today. All cities include many immigrants in their population. Aboriginal people from across the state have been attracted to suburbs such as Pyrmont, Balmain, Rozelle, Glebe and Redfern since the 1930s. Changes in government legislation in the 1960s provided freedom of movement enabling more Aboriginal people to choose to live in Sydney.

=== Darlinghurst Ridge/Woolloomooloo Hill ===
In the 1830s the whole area from Potts Point to Kings Cross and up to Oxford Street was known as Darlinghurst–probably named in honour of Governor Ralph Darling (1824–31)'s wife, Eliza. The rocky ridge that extended inland from Potts Point was called Eastern or Woolloomooloo Hill from the early days of white settlement. The earliest grant of land on Woolloomooloo Hill was made to Judge-Advocate John Wylde in 1822. In 1830 Wylde sold six of his 11 acres on the Point to Joseph Hyde Potts, accountant to the Bank of NSW, after whom Potts Point is named.

By the late 1820s Sydney was a crowded, disorderly and unsanitary town closely settled around the Rocks and Sydney Cove, with a European population of around 12,000. Governor Darling was receiving applications from prominent Sydney citizens for better living conditions. The ridge of Woolloomooloo Hill beckoned, offering proximity to town and incomparable views from the Blue Mountains to the heads of Sydney Harbour.

In 1828 Darling ordered the subdivision of Woolloomooloo Hill into suitable "town allotments" for large residences and extensive gardens. He then issued "deeds of grant" to select members of colonial society (in particular, his senior civil servants). The first 7 grants were issued in 1828, with the other allotments formally granted in 1831.

The private residences that were built on the grants were required to meet Darling's so-called "villa conditions" which were possibly determined and overseen by his wife, who had architectural skills. These ensured that only one residence was built on each grant to an approved standard and design, that they were each set within a generous amount of landscaped land and that, in most cases, they faced the town. By the mid-1830s the parade of "white" villas down the spine of Woolloomooloo Hill presented a picturesque sight, and was visible from the harbour and town of Sydney.

The name of the suburb [Potts Point] honours Joseph Hyde Potts, who was employed with the Bank of New South Wales when it initially opened for business in 1817. Before the arrival of the settlers, the Point was known by a variety of names, among them Paddy's Point, Kurrajeen (or Curageen) and Yarrandabbi. The last two are Aboriginal names and "Paddy" may have been Patrick Walsh, who received a grant of 30 acres here in 1809.

=== Bomera and Tarana ===
==== Bomera ====
The subject site formed part of the land grant to Judge-Advocate John Wylde (after whom Wylde Street is named) in 1822, which comprised 11 acres of land at the northern end of the Point.".

William McQuade (Sr.), merchant of Windsor, first purchased land at Potts Point in June 1856. He also purchased adjacent allotments including one to the east, on which Tarana was built by 1889 and a second lot to the south in June 1857. McQuade also purchased four other sites in 1858 with the result that his land stretched along Wylde Street to Victoria Street. Early title documents refer to minor works and a boat harbour on Woolloomooloo Bay. McQuade also helped establish Randwick Racecourse.

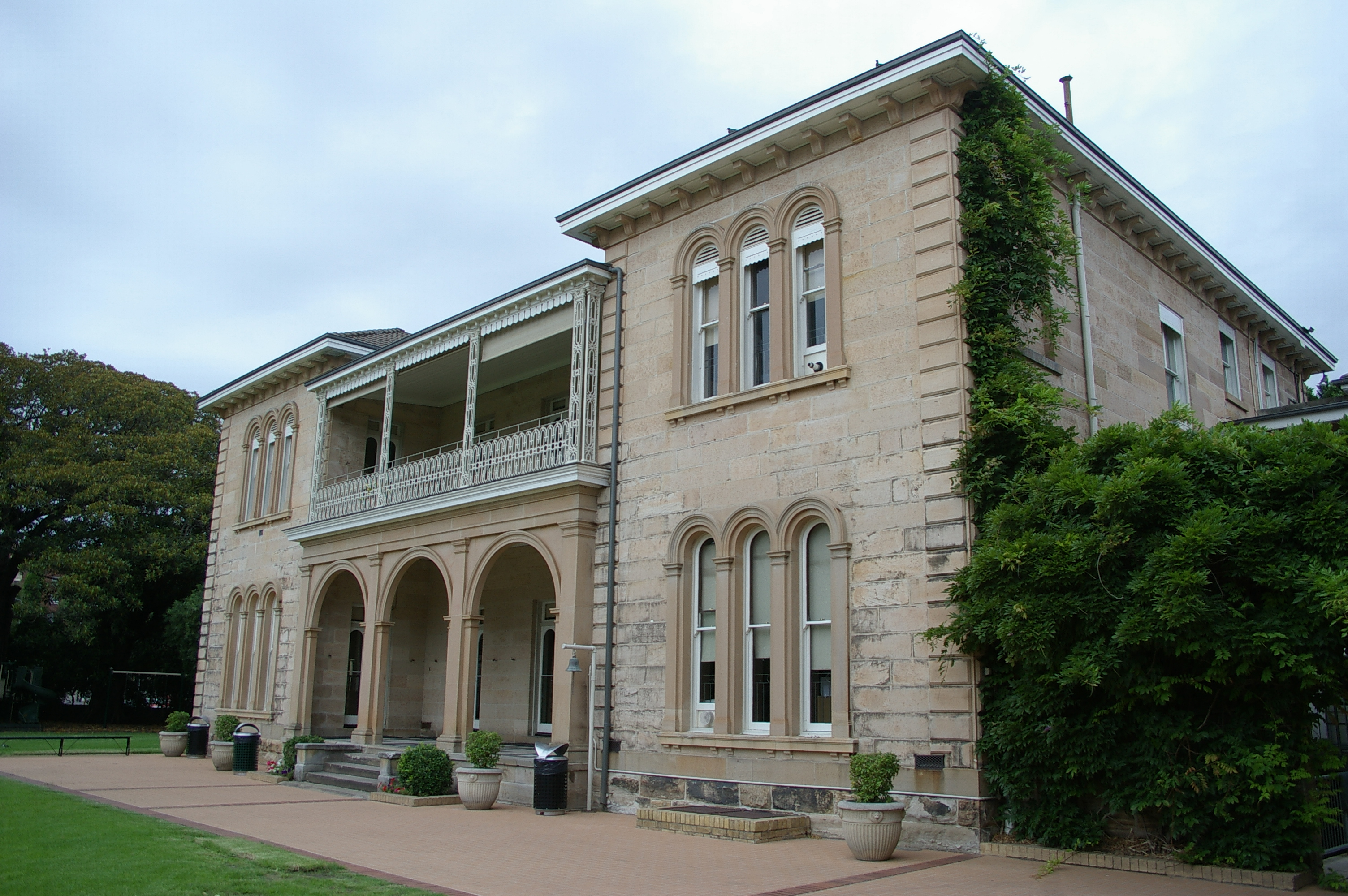
Fiona at Edgecliff has an identical front elevation to Bomera in Potts Point.

McQuade occupied and cleared the land [on which Bomera and the stables stand] in 1856 and commenced construction of Bomera the same year. The complex consisted of a two-storey building designed as a house by architect John Frederick Hilly (who lived up hill at "Campbell Lodge" and designed Carrara (now Strickland House) in that same year, Fiona (now Ascham School, Edgecliff) seven years later). Fiona and Bomera have identical front elevations and constructed in sandstone in the early Italianate style, as well as a two-storey building originally serving as a stables and a coach house, also in sandstone.

Tenders for construction of the stables/coach house were probably let in July 1857 and for the boundary wall, iron fence and gates in September 1857. There is no record of the date of completion of construction of stables or boundary elements, but they appear in a survey map of 1865. The stables, coach house and boundary walls and fences were completed by 1865 to designs by Hilly. Bomera's builder is not known.

The Australian Subscription Boat Club was built on McQuade's land at Potts Point in 1861. By 1862 McQuade had reclaimed large areas from the bay on which he erected a bathing house and pool, approached by steps, to the north of the future site of Tarana. The northern areas of the site had been developed as a garden, with the land to the west serving as a kitchen garden. The term "marine villa" was employed in the Sydney Morning Herald when sub-divided land was offered for sale in the 1860s and clearly demonstrates the importance given to the social and recreational opportunities offered by the foreshores. A gatehouse was erected in 1865 on Wylde Street.

In 1867 a further grant allowed additional reclamation of foreshore areas and the construction of a new jetty in 1876. An octagonal summer house had been erected by 1875 as well as two flagpoles, an iron picket fence along the foreshore and two stone statues of dogs. In 1876 tenders were called by J.F. Hilly, for erection of a ballroom, with a timber floor, and other additions.

Major modifications were made to the building and grounds, almost certainly in 1876. These included the billiards room, the large central room on the south of the building, and a second stone jetty. The works may also have included the construction of the two-storey extension at the north-west corner of the building. John Frederick Hilly has been confirmed as architect for these works.

By 1884 the new foreshore areas included a tennis court.

William McQuade Sr. lived on his country property "Fairfield" at Windsor, which was built for the Cox family. This survives today surrounded on two sides by a golf course. McQuade built his own private race course which is now the site of Hawkesbury Racecourse (just east of Richmond). McQuade Sr. died in 1885. He had three sons - William (Jr.), Frederick and Henry.

Following the death of William McQuade in 1885 the estate was divided. Land south of Bomera went to William James Hale McQuade (the eldest son) and land to the east of Bomera to (William's son) Arthur Frederick Hale McQuade. (Arthur Frederick Hale McQuade was left money with which, Tarana was erected adjacent to Bomera by 1889 for he and his family). Henry Michael Hale McQuaid inherited Bomera. The construction of Tarana in 1889 led to the destruction of structures associated with Bomera including sheds and glasshouses. Fairfield at Windsor was left to Henry, the youngest son.

The three sons studied at Cambridge and studied pipe organ under the great masters in Europe. William brought a Bryceson pipe organ back from Manchester and installed it in Bomera's ballroom, Henry brought back from England a Hunter pipe organ and installed it in Fairfield. After William Jr.'s death in 1901, Frederick transferred the organ from Bomera to the ballroom of Tarana in time to entertain the officers of "The Great White Fleet" (which visited Sydney) in 1908. Eventually this organ was sold to St Brigid's Church, Marrickville, where it remains in fine voice. Henry's Hunter organ is in St Matthew's Catholic Church, Windsor . Mrs McQuade's monument is the imposing and largest monument at the front entrance of St Matthew's Anglican Church, Windsor.

In 1890 much of the south-west corner of the Bomera site was acquired by the state government. The former Boat Club, walls and steps in this area were removed in the subsequent works for new wharfage. This action followed the state government's acquisition of the whole of the Bomera property in 1910 following the McQuade's 11-year battle to force the purchase of the whole of the site. In 1917 the building was acquired by the Sydney Harbour Trust.

The building was either occupied by members of the McQuade family or leased as a residence until c. 1902. At this time it became a boarding house, and works involving the adaptation of the building to its new use were carried out. The architects responsible for these works were Sheerin and Hennessy.

In 1902 Bomera had been extended by the addition of servants rooms to the northern side of the stables building creating a wing at right angles to the original building and linking with the main house. This new wing appears to have been designed by the architectural practice of Sheerin and Hennessy. Sections of this wing were removed, when the complex was modified by the Navy, in the post-war years.

From 1902 until 1941 the house was used to provide boarding accommodation. Various changes were effected during this period including partitioning and the addition of stairs and external walkways to the stables. The ballroom was converted to a dining room.

In 1911 ownership was transferred to the Sydney Harbour Trust. During this period Bomera was sub-leased and physically subdivided. In 1911 the Cowper Wharf Roadway was implemented reducing the area of the gardens above the existing retaining wall, which subsequently became the southern side of Wylde Street in 1941. Extensions to Wylde Street were implemented in 1941, which until then had been a cul de sac terminating outside the Bomera stables. The new road alignment encircled Bomera and Tarana isolating them from the foreshores.

In June 1941 it was acquired by the Commonwealth Government for naval use. Throughout the period of Commonwealth ownership the building with Tarana served as Sydney Naval Fleet Base Headquarters (offices), Eastern Australian Command. During the war parts of the building's interior were returned to a form basically similar to that in which they existed prior to acquisition by the Sydney Harbour Trust in 1917, except for the south-east wing and their servant's wing, which were almost totally removed.

The stable building was modified to accommodate ambulances with internal and external changes to the house and its finishes to reflect operational needs.

In 1955 a bust of Lord Nelson was placed in the garden north of the house. Until the 1980s the ballroom was used for court-martial hearings when most administrative functions were transferred to the new Maritime Command Centre at Garden Island. The property remains under Navy occupation.

Since the war a considerable amount of partitioning and other works have again taken place, with detrimental effects to the significant fabric of the building. The building is, however, still substantially intact, and sufficient documentary evidence exists to enable works to be carried out to preserve and enhance its heritage qualities.

In 2001 manufacturer-turned property developer Jorge Fernandez and his wife Monica bought Bomera and Tarana from the Department of Defence. Bomera was restored by heritage architects Graham Brooks & Associates.

After two years on the real estate market, Bomera was sold in 2013 to Queenslander Leanne Catelan for $12.5 million, daughter of property mugul Ray Catelan, the entrepreneur behind real estate database RP Data.

In 2019, Catelan sold Bomera to billionaire Sanjeev Gupta for $34 million.

==== Tarana ====
Tarana was built as a private house between 10 November 1888 and 9 December 1889, for Arthur Frederick Hale McQuade. The architect was probably Edward Harman Buchanan, and the builder John Alexander Oag. Along with Bomera Tarana was constructed for leading Sydney families at a time when the Darlinghurst-Potts Point ridge and the adjacent waterfront was the location of mansions of the affluent.

It became the Ashford Ladies College between 1890/91 and 1894/95, and reverted to use as a single private residence until 1919. Major modifications to the building in 1907 by Sheerin and Hennessy included the addition of a third storey to the buildings. The ballroom extension and portico, and rebuilding of the bathing house boathouse may also have been executed at this time.

In 1917 Tarana was acquired by the Sydney Harbour Trust, and during this period of ownership was subdivided into flats. In June 1941 the building was acquired by the Commonwealth. Throughout the period of Commonwealth acquisition the building served as Naval Fleet Headquarters, Eastern Australian Command. During the War the building's interior was returned to a form basically similar to that in which it existed prior to acquisition by the Sydney Harbour Trust in 1917, although the verandahs, the billiards room ceiling and the site elements were lost.

Since the war a considerable amount of partitioning and other works have again taken place, with detrimental effects to the early fabric of the building. The building is nevertheless substantially intact, and sufficient documentary evidence exists to enable works to be carried out to preserve and enhance its heritage qualities. Areas of archaeological potential include the southern portions beneath the house, and the roof space.

In 2001 manufacturer-turned property developer Jorge Fernandez and his wife Monica bought Bomera and Tarana from the Department of Defence. Tarana was converted to three luxurious apartments, which Fernandez subsequently sold.

== Description ==
Bomera and Tarana are a pair of Victorian marine villas, oriented with their main facade overlooking the harbour rather than the street, on a 3700 square metre combined site.

Bomera was constructed as a marine villa on the prominent headland areas of Potts Point to take advantage of the harbour views, which extended from the western elevation through 180 degrees to the eastern side, which faced towards the Heads. Marine Villas such as Bomera, and other villas erected on land fronting Sydney Harbour, differed in their orientation in that they faced towards the harbour in contrast to villas on more urban sites. Although Bomera, and its neighbour Tarana, clearly retain their orientation and limited views and some garden, physical links with the waterfront recreational areas have been severed.

Tarana and Bomera occupy a site reduced in area by the impact of harbour works including the Cowper Wharf Roadway in 1911 and the formalisation of Wylde Street and the extension of Garden Island Dockyard from 1941. Bomera however, continues to make a prominent contribution to the Wylde Street frontage in association with Tarana, and to the harbour setting, and is a valuable cultural link with other mid to late nineteenth century marine villas in the Potts Point area. The latter include its neighbour Tarana, and Jenner and Elizabeth Bay House.

=== Bomera ===
==== House ====
Bomera is a two-storey, Italianate styled marine villa located above Cowper Wharf Road, concealed at street level by the large retaining wall, but prominent from the water. It reflects the design and planning of classically influenced double pile houses erected in the first half of the nineteenth century. Such houses often featured a single storey loggia between projecting bays and an entrance vestibule wider than other circulation areas. At Bomera the loggia is expressed at ground floor level on the north side with the first floor expression of the verandah continued in cast iron. The loggia illustrates Hilly's use of large arched openings in verandahs. The vestibule is centred on the western side to provide access to the central corridor. The ground floor level is expressed externally by a rusticated base.

It is a rare building type within Sydney and forms an important association with the other villas Elizabeth Bay House, Tusculum, Rockwall, Jenner House and Tarana (adjacent). It is a remnant of the marine villas that were sited relative to the water and determined the prestige residential status of the Potts Point peninsula in the nineteenth century and for its contribution to the waterscape of Potts Point.

The main elevations feature three bay elements picking up the rhythm of the western breakfront with its projecting porch. Classically detailed, the porch is supported on piers flanked by stone sphinxes. The projecting bays on the north side include large three bay sash windows with narrow projecting balconies at first floor level. The central loggia/verandah space features three arched openings supported by masonry piers with pilasters and classical detailing. This classical detail is reflected in the arched detailing of the timber sash windows. The corners of the fine sandstone ashlar masonry are defined by quoins. The southern limit of the original building appears to have been defined by the central corridor. A low, partly excavated basement, accessed from the northern side of the building, was used to store perishables.

Two periods of extension are apparent. In 1876 J. F. Hilly extended his original design by the addition of an upper verandah, with cast iron supports, on the northern side. On the southern side a ballroom, with curved external corners and an internal decorated cast iron gallery, was added opposite the northern verandah. The ball-room features a coffered timber ceiling and originally a glazed rooflight. The rectangular apse at the southern end held an organ. The ballroom features three bay clerestory lighting and classically detailed fireplaces in keeping with the overall Italianate idiom of the house. At the north east corner an open, two storey loggia, entered from the breakfast room, was also added. In keeping with the concept of the marine villa, rooms opening onto the verandahs and loggias feature French doors.

By 1902 Bomera was extended at its eastern side in the Federation style by the addition of a servants' wing, bridging the gap between the stables and the house, and reflecting the line of the open loggia added in the 1870s. This was removed in 1941 with the exception of two rooms adjoining the house. The two storey loggia appears to have been infilled at this time.

The main roof is hipped with a slate covering. The wide eaves retain the original timber soffits with supporting modillions and fascias largely intact. Later additions, including the ballroom, are roofed with a combination of slate and copper, the copper replacing an earlier lead covering. The building retains most of the original timberwork, including stairs, architraves and doors, and internal plaster finishes, including cornices, intact. Internal surface finishes have been mostly lost. The ground floor hall and stairs are in white marble with slate dividing strips. Some basement floors have been replaced in concrete. Evidence of the social functioning of the house is provided by a servants' bell in the north-east ground floor room and the suite of smaller rooms added in 1876.

==== Grounds ====
The grounds of Bomera occupy a prominent position at the northernmost tip of Potts Point. They were established c. 1856 contemporary with the residence and include mature gardens, trees and statues designed as an intrinsic part of the house and estate. Bomera is located on a 2156 square metre block.

Bomera's house was designed with two directions in mind - Woolloomooloo Bay and the harbour to the north. Access from the south resulted in service areas, including stables and servants quarters, being located on the south side. Unlike later marine villas the main entrance from the carriageway was on the western side overlooking the harbour. The early Sydney roads were poor and arrival by water on the foreshore would have conferred a sense of status and the opportunity to impress by the extent of their gardens and recreational settings. The location of this main entrance to the west allowed both of these options. The original carriageway alignment remains in place with its stone edging. The two storeyed ashlar sandstone stables building remains in place at the entrance from Wylde Street.

Garden elements include one of the original carved stone dogs, an 1890s iron picket fence, mature pine trees, two Californian desert fan palms (Washingtonia robusta), a Canary Island date palm (Phoenix canariensis), grass terrace at the rear (north-western) facade, a hedge demarcating a change of level to lower terraces, a swimming pool on the lower northern terrace, stone boundary walls and a tuckeroo tree (Cupaniopsis anacardioides).

Sandstone bust of Lord Nelson in Bomera's garden was originally in the gardens at the Annandale Estate of Commander Robert Johnson, one of the first Australian-born officers serving in the Royal Navy.

In the landscaped grounds are an eight-car garage and a three bedroom cottage.

==== Stables ====
It is a two storeyed ashlar sandstone building on an L-shaped plan erected in two stages. In keeping with the main house the roof is hipped with slate cladding. The building has some intact windows and joinery at first floor level, although some new door openings and windows were inserted during World War Two. The use of stone for the stables building, which also functioned as a coach house, clearly states the importance of the building as the point of entry to the site.

The stables present original sandstone external wall facades featuring extant heads and sills to some windows and a hipped slate roof with original eaves including fascias, soffits and soffit mouldings. The south elevation was treated as the prime side of the stables and the crook of the east and west wings enclosed the main stables-related working area. This elevation features window heads and sills to larger first floor window, WWII opening and sill to small window, original window frames and sashes and a recycled small window frame and sash at first floor level. The Western elevation was the least important side of the stables building and was originally a totally blank and recessive facade. After successive additions and alterations during and after WWII it has reverted to its original state and now features blank original sandstone block external walls. The Northern elevation originally comprised a facade that was largely devoid of features. It generally features sandstone external walls with some original and early openings filled in during or after WWII. The doors and windows added during the 1942 works remain.

=== Tarana ===
Tarana is located above Cowper Wharf Road, concealed at street level by the large retaining wall, but prominent from the water. It comprises a three-storey residence of Victorian style, located on a prominent site with water views on the Potts Point peninsula. It contributes to the waterscape of Potts Point in particular its relationship to the adjacent Bomera. As with Bomera, it is rare as a marine villa within Sydney, and forms an important association with Elizabeth Bay House, Tusculum and Jenner House.

It is a c. 1889 home in Victorian Italianate style. It includes a private entrance area, reception foyer, marble powder room. Large ballroom is now living/dining room with domed ceiling, stained glass, frescoes. The building has now been converted to three apartments in a security garden complex.

The south facade has a main symmetrical three storey wing with servant wings stepped along the boundary to the east. The 1907 two storey ballroom wing protrudes forward on the west.

The windows and doors are vertical with flat heads and bracketed entablatures over. The roof is slate with the 1907 chimneys intact. By contrast the north facade to the water has a three-storey verandah where the cast iron has been replaced by timber detailing. The servant and ballroom wing is set below the main roof. Two paired rooms open onto the verandah which is also accessed by a central stair. A fire stair is located adjacent to the verandah. The asymmetrical plan reflects that of the main wing with its central hall and off centre stair. The plan arrangement is intact with some original features including the timber stair, fireplaces, and vestibule arches.

Tarana is a remnant of the marine villas that were sited relative to the water and determined the prestige residential status of the Potts Point peninsula in the nineteenth century. It is an important work of E. H. Buchanan and was residence for two generations of the McQuade family, an important early Australian family.

The design is well resolved and particularly noted for its main wing which contains an off centre stair in the central hall, and two paired rooms opening onto the verandah. There is some archaeological potential within the house and grounds. The garden has a grass terrace at the rear (north-western) facade, with trees and shrubs to the northern side, hedges demarcating changes in level and a Canary Island date palm (Phoenix canariensis) prominent

== Heritage listing ==
Although Bomera and Tarana are significant in their own right, a great deal of their cultural significance lies in their relationship to each other. The buildings are significant because they provide a rare example of a pair of adjacent houses constructed for two successive generations of an important Australian family.

Bomera and Tarana provide good examples of the nineteenth-century houses of the Potts Point area. Their survival in relatively intact condition, when virtually all their nearby contemporaries have fallen, is quite remarkable. Together they provide a waterfront component of the former nineteenth-century waterfront houses stretching from Darling Point to Potts Point. The precinct is also important because of their joint use as Naval Fleet Headquarters, Eastern Australian Command, during and after the Second World War and for its continuing association with the Navy.

Bomera & Tarana was listed on the New South Wales State Heritage Register on 23 June 2000 having satisfied the following criteria.

The place is important in demonstrating the course, or pattern, of cultural or natural history in New South Wales.

Bomera is the oldest remaining building at the northern end of Potts Point and one of the oldest in Potts Point. Tarana was the last house of its type constructed in the same location in the nineteenth century.

Although the houses are significant in their own right, a great deal of their cultural significance lies in their precinct relationship to each other. The buildings are significant because they provide a rare example of a pair of adjacent houses constructed for successive generations of an important Australian family.

The place is important in demonstrating aesthetic characteristics and/or a high degree of creative or technical achievement in New South Wales.

Bomera is significant as an early example of the Italianate Villa style and because its designer, John Frederick Hilly, was one of the most important Sydney architects of the nineteenth century. Tarana retains fine original joinery, fireplaces, plaster mouldings and leadlights typical of the period. Also, because it may have been designed by Edward Harman Buchanan, it is a good and rare example of his house designs. The Bomera and Tarana precinct provide an important visual focus at the extremity of the Point when viewed from the harbour.

The place has a strong or special association with a particular community or cultural group in New South Wales for social, cultural or spiritual reasons.

Bomera has considerable social significance having been built for William McQuade, a leading member of a family of importance in the social, cultural and political development of early Sydney. Tarana was built for a member of the next generation of the same family. The precinct is a rare survivor of the nineteenth century period of the Potts Point area. The precinct is also important because of the use of the houses as Naval Fleet Headquarters during and after the Second World War and for its continuing association with the Navy.

The place has potential to yield information that will contribute to an understanding of the cultural or natural history of New South Wales.

The Bomera Tarana precinct (particularly Bomera) contains remnant sites of archaeological significance, relating to the former foreshore gardens and structure to the harbour.
