= 55 Victoria Street, Potts Point =

55 Victoria Street
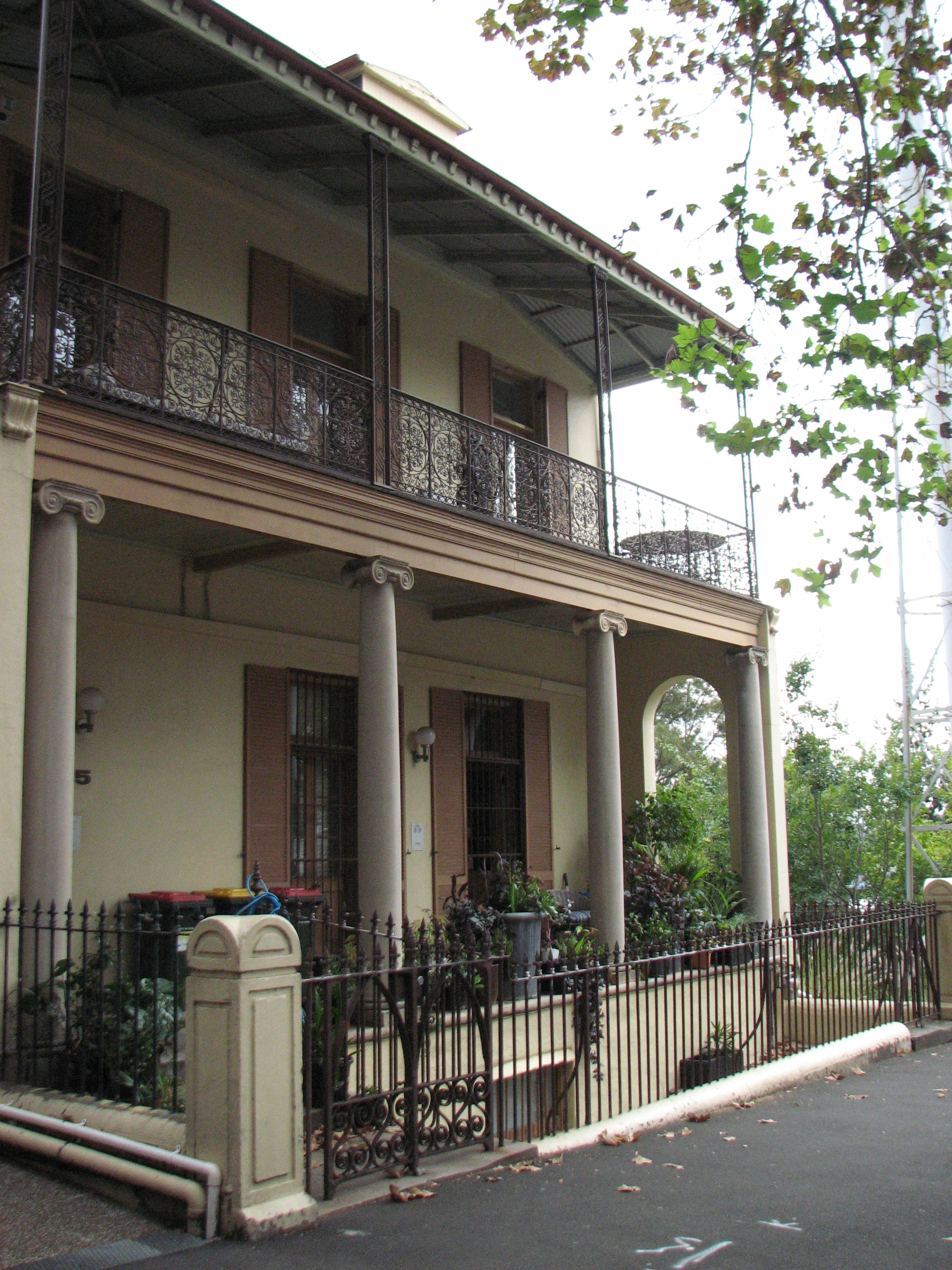
- 55 Victoria Street, Potts Point, New South Wales

- Location within Sydney Location within Australia
- 33.8694°S 151.2231°E
- Location: 55 Victoria Street, Potts Point, City of Sydney, New South Wales, Australia

History
- Built: 1875

New South Wales Heritage Register
- Official name: Terrace
- Type: state heritage (built)
- Designated: 2 April 1999
- Reference no.: 68
- Type: Terrace
- Category: Residential buildings (private)

55 Victoria Street is a heritage-listed residence and former boarding house and Catholic Women's Association hostel located in the inner city Sydney suburb of Potts Point, New South Wales, Australia. It was built in 1875. It was added to the New South Wales State Heritage Register on 2 April 1999.

== History ==
=== Aboriginal history ===
The "Eora people" was the name given to the coastal Aborigines around Sydney. Central Sydney is therefore often referred to as "Eora Country". Within the City of Sydney local government area, the traditional owners are the Cadigal and Wangal bands of the Eora. There is no written record of the name of the language spoken and currently there are debates as whether the coastal peoples spoke a separate language "Eora" or whether this was actually a dialect of the Dharug language. Remnant bushland in places like Blackwattle Bay retain elements of traditional plant, bird and animal life, including fish and rock oysters.

With the invasion of the Sydney region, the Cadigal and Wangal people were decimated but there are descendants still living in Sydney today. All cities include many immigrants in their population. Aboriginal people from across the state have been attracted to suburbs such as Pyrmont, Balmain, Rozelle, Glebe and Redfern since the 1930s. Changes in government legislation in the 1960s provided freedom of movement enabling more Aboriginal people to choose to live in Sydney.

=== Darlinghurst Ridge/Woolloomooloo Hill ===
In the 1830s the whole area from Potts Point to Kings Cross and up to Oxford Street was known as Darlinghurst- probably named in honour of Governor Ralph Darling (1824–31)'s wife, Eliza. The rocky ridge that extended inland from Potts Point was called Eastern or Woolloomooloo Hill from the early days of white settlement. The earliest grant of land on Woolloomooloo Hill was made to Judge-Advocate John Wylde in 1822. In 1830 Wylde sold six of his 11 acres on the Point to Joseph Hyde Potts, accountant to the Bank of New South Wales (NSW), after whom Potts Point is named.

By the late 1820s Sydney was a crowded, disorderly and unsanitary town closely settled around the Rocks and Sydney Cove, with a European population of around 12000. Governor Darling was receiving applications from prominent Sydney citizens for better living conditions. The ridge of Woolloomooloo Hill beckoned, offering proximity to town and incomparable views from the Blue Mountains to the heads of Sydney Harbour.

In 1828 Darling ordered the subdivision of Woolloomooloo Hill into suitable "town allotments" for large residences and extensive gardens. He then issued "deeds of grant" to select members of colonial society (in particular, his senior civil servants). The first seven grants were issued in 1828, with the other allotments formally granted in 1831.

The private residences that were built on the grants were required to meet Darling's so-called "villa conditions" which were possibly determined and overseen by his wife, who had architectural skills. These ensured that only one residence was built on each grant to an approved standard and design, that they were each set within a generous amount of landscaped land and that, in most cases, they faced the town. By the mid-1830s the parade of "white" villas down the spine of Woolloomooloo Hill presented a picturesque sight, and was visible from the harbour and town of Sydney.

=== 55 Victoria Street ===
55 Victoria Street was constructed in the 1870s on a site that formed part of a parcel of land that was granted by Governor Ralph Darling to John Busby in 1831. John Busby, surveyor and civil engineer was one of the 13 nominees for grants on Woolloomooloo Hill. Each agreed to build a substantial building to a design that would be approved by the Governor within three years of the grant. As a result, the area, which had not been allocated previously for agricultural activities due to its barren and rocky nature, became established with large villas by the mid 1830s.

Busby's land extended from "Woloomoloo Bay" to "Woloomoloo Road" (later renamed Woolloomooloo and Macleay Street respectively). Busby's neighbours included judges Sir James Stephen and John Stephen, and Ambrose Hallen, the Colonial Architect. It was Hallen who was responsible for the plan that established Victoria and Brougham Streets with the permission of Busby and his influential neighbours, whose villas stood mainly on the ridge overlooking the proposed new streets and the emerging city beyond.

The creation of Victoria Street effectively subdivided the early land grants and created a series of smaller land parcels, which were later subdivided in an ongoing pattern that has resulted in the dense development of the area today. However, back in the 1850s the area contained only grand villas on large estates. In the 1870s when number 55 was constructed on a steep, narrow parcel of land extending from Victoria Street to Brougham Street the area to the north was still largely covered with gardens and bush. Indeed, the area was described at the time as the "Regent's Park of Sydney".

The suburban development of Woolloomooloo began at the head of the bay where the low tidal flats allowed for the construction of wharves and warehouse on reclaimed land. When the three-storey terrace was built at 55 Victoria Street the area to the north was occupied by the large estates with mature gardens. The areas of the south was developing rapidly with large houses and terraces on smaller parcels of land. A large terrace was built around 1860 on the site immediately south of Number 55 and it is this large building that identifies the site of Number 55 prior to its own construction. The McElhone steps were not built until about 1990.

Immediately prior to the construction of 55 Victoria Street the suburbs of Woolloomooloo and Darlinghurst were densely developed around the wharves at the southern end of the bay. In contrast very little development had occurred to the north on Woolloomooloo Hill and Potts Point where the large estates still dominated the landscape.

The property originally formed part of a grant of more than 8 acres to John Busby. In 834 the title passed to Semphill, Ryder, Semphill (again), Little and to Charles Elouis on 1 February 1875. Between this date and 1982, when Elouis applied to bring the title under the provisions of the Real Property Act, the three-storey terrace was constructed. The construction date was probably around 1877.

The earliest view of the terrace at 55 Victoria Street, Potts Point is a view taken from the Domain about 1882. It shows the building in its current built form. It appears light (almost white) in tone adjacent to other buildings and objects. The McElhone Steps do not appear in the view.

The building still appeared light in colour early in the twentieth century following construct of the McElhone Steps. Charles Elouis lived at the place and others are recorded in the Sands Street Directory also living at this address. Elouis might have lived elsewhere from 1880 to 1896.

Charles Elouis was the ratepayer from 1877 until 1880 and from 1896 until 1906. After his death his wife Alice, whom he married from 1913. The place as it was during Charles and Alice's last years together shows in the background of a photo of an early cottage that stood on the adjacent site. It shows 55 Victoria Street still as a light coloured building by comparison with the surrounding features. However, by 1931 it had taken on the ubiquitous stone tones of most of Sydney's terrace. Also by 1931 the adjoining tall sewerage ventilation stack had been built. It shows in an aerial photograph by Sydney's prominent photographer, Hall.

The rate books indicate that in 1931 the Catholic Women's Association occupied the place. Alice Elouis was still alive but living at Waratah. The place had become a hostel at that time and 1932 it became a boarding house known as Rosmoyne Flats. In 1935 the title was transferred to John Peza. It appears that he continued the use and that the subsequent owners Hamilton (1949–51) and Blok (1951–70) occupied and managed the place as a boarding house and flats. In 1970 Victoria Point Pty Ltd acquired it for redevelopment. The site then became associated with one of Sydney's most protracted and notorious development disputes involving passionate battles over the rights of tenants and the future of the city fringe. It entered the city's folklore when journalist and activist Juanita Nielsen, who had been a leader of the anti-development campaign, disappeared and was never seen again.

The National Trust of Australia (NSW) was drawn into the dispute and was compelled by force of public opinion to list the place of the National Trust Register as part of a classified precinct. The National Trust records from 1971 contain details of the events that occurred after 1970. When the NSW Heritage Council was formed in 1977 it had the power to provide permanent protection by way of conservation orders. A permanent conservation order over 55 Victoria Street was gazetted in September 1981.

Plans for redevelopment of the site were lodged with Sydney City Council in 1971 but the work did not commence until 1981.

Prior to 1970 the building remained largely intact in its authentic form. However between 1970 and 1981, when the so-called restoration works commenced, the place was vandalised and some of the authentic detailing was destroyed. Further losses occurred when verandas, windows and external doors were then reconstructed in modern materials to details that do not accord with the original design The rear (west side) verandas and end screens were removed and not replaced. A modern colour scheme was introduced.

Research undertaken in 2001 revealed that the building was painted in a cream brown colour scheme in the early 1980s and in a cream and green scheme, similar to the current scheme but with lashings of gold paint on trim elements, in about 1990. The current scheme is plain.

== Description ==
55 Victoria Street, Potts Point is a three-storey terrace that stands beside the McElhone Steps at the northern end of Victoria Street.

== Heritage listing ==
55 Victoria Street was listed on the New South Wales State Heritage Register on 2 April 1999.
