= Tusculum, Potts Point =

Tusculum
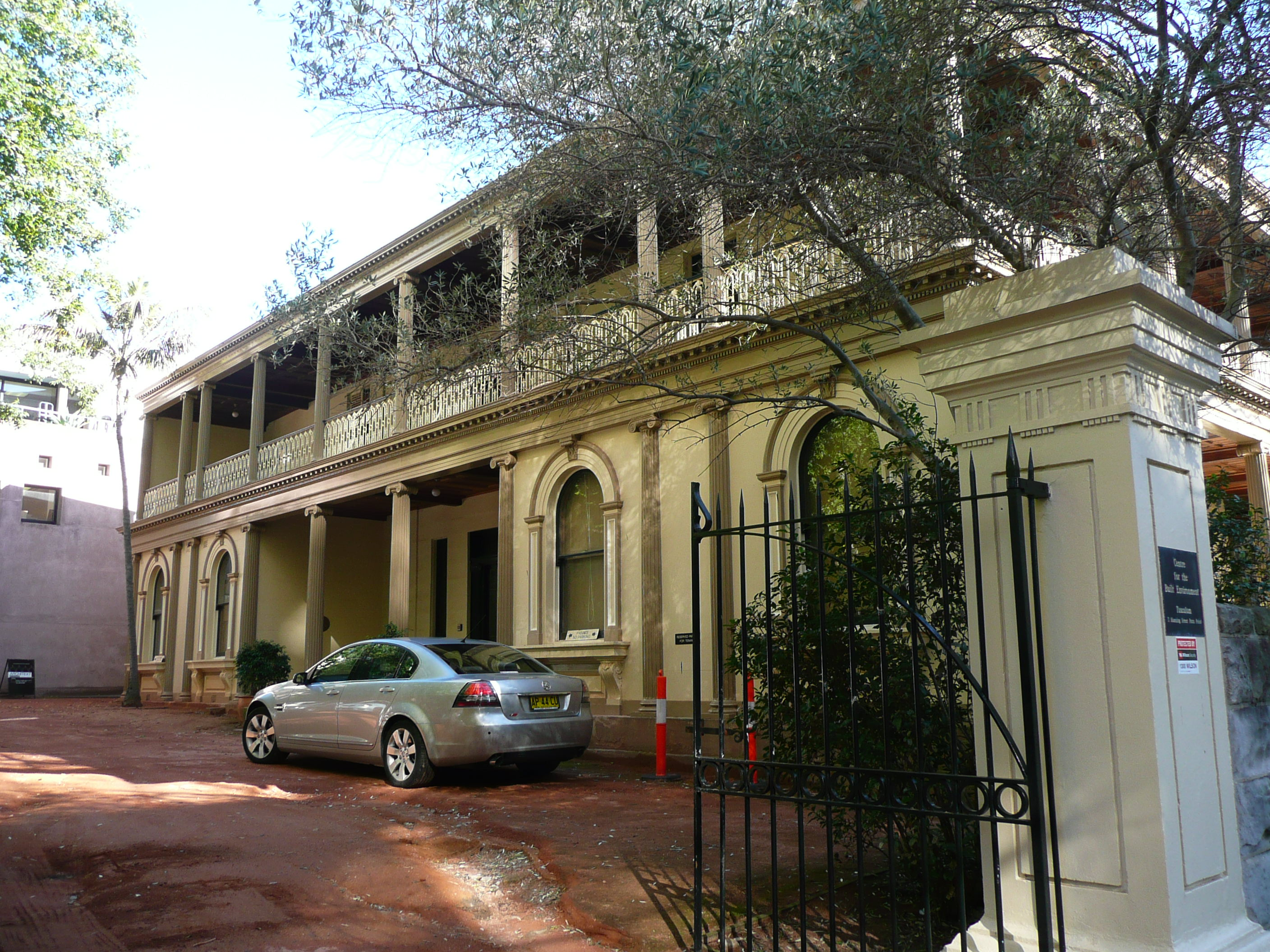

- Location within Sydney Location within Australia
- 33.8711°S 151.2245°E
- Location: 1–3 Manning Street, Potts Point, City of Sydney, New South Wales, Australia

History
- Built: 1831–1837
- Built for: Alexander Brodie Spark

Site notes
- Architect: John Verge
- Architectural style: Colonial Regency
- Owner: Historic Houses Trust of NSW

New South Wales Heritage Register
- Official name: Tusculum
- Type: state heritage (built)
- Designated: 2 April 1999
- Reference no.: 27
- Type: Villa
- Category: Residential buildings (private)

Tusculum is a heritage-listed former residence and now offices at 1–3 Manning Street in the inner city Sydney suburb of Potts Point in the City of Sydney local government area of New South Wales, Australia. It was built from 1831 to 1837 to the design of John Verge for successful businessman Alexander Brodie Spark. It was then let to influential cleric William Broughton, the first and only Anglican Bishop of Australia and later inaugural Bishop of Sydney, from 1836 to 1851. It is owned today by the Historic Houses Trust of New South Wales. It was added to the New South Wales State Heritage Register on 2 April 1999.

== History ==
=== History of the area ===
In the 1830s the whole area from Potts Point to Kings Cross and up to Oxford Street was known as Darlinghurst- probably named in honour of Governor Ralph Darling’s (1824–31) wife, Eliza. The rocky ridge that extended inland from Potts Point was called Eastern or Woolloomooloo Hill from the early days of white settlement. The earliest grant of land on Woolloomooloo Hill was made to Judge-Advocate John Wylde in 1822. In 1830 Wylde sold six of his 11 acres on the Point to Joseph Hyde Potts, accountant to the Bank of New South Wales, after whom Potts Point is named.

By the late 1820s Sydney was a crowded, disorderly and unsanitary town closely settled around the Rocks and Sydney Cove, with a European population of around 12000. Governor Darling was receiving applications from prominent Sydney citizens for better living conditions. The ridge of Woolloomooloo Hill beckoned, offering proximity to town and incomparable views from the Blue Mountains to the heads of Sydney Harbour.

In 1828 Darling ordered the subdivision of Woolloomooloo Hill into suitable "town allotments" for large residences and extensive gardens. He then issued "deeds of grant" to select members of colonial society (in particular, his senior civil servants). The first seven grants were issued in 1828, with the other allotments formally granted in 1831.

The private residences that were built on the grants were required to meet Darling's so-called "villa conditions" which were possibly determined and overseen by his wife, who had architectural skills. These ensured that only one residence was built on each grant to an approved standard and design, that they were each set within a generous amount of landscaped land and that, in most cases, they faced the town. By the mid-1830s the parade of "white" villas down the spine of Woolloomooloo Hill presented a picturesque sight, and was visible from the harbour and town of Sydney.

=== History of Tusculum ===
==== Ownership by Alexander Brodie Spark ====
Tusculum was named by its original owner, Alexander Brodie Spark (1792–1856), after a town in the Alban Hills, 10 kilometres south-east of Rome where wealthy Romans built luxurious villas – that of Cicero being especially famous. The name of Spark's other property, "Tempe House" also has classical origins.

The building of the house signified Spark's rise to good fortune during the 1820s. He arrived in Sydney as a free settler in 1823. His success in shipping and commerce meant that he was quickly accepted as an influential member of colonial society. Spark had received a literary education, which may account for the naming of his villa. His 1828 grant of over 9 acres was one of the few original grants made to a private citizen. John Verge's plan for Tusculum was approved by Governor Darling in 1830. Spark probably built it as an investment property, as he only lived there for a brief period. The villa was under construction from 1831-5.

His failure to occupy it symbolised Spark's financial decline, the collapse of the Bank of Australia and the depression of the 1840s. Spark sent a plan of his proposed house to the Colonial Secretary on 1 June 1830, explaining that the plan had been prepared for some time, but that he had wanted to make it more "ornamental". This is 10 months prior to the first reference to Spark's house in John Verge's ledger. It is possible that Spark may have had the earlier plan prepared independently, and engaged Verge to assist in making it "more ornamental". John Verge's ledger records details of the commission from "Plans" in 1831 to "Details for Pilasters front door of" shortly before completion in 1836.

==== Bishop William Broughton as a tenant ====
Alterations were made in 1836 to suit its first tenant, Bishop William Broughton. The Broughtons made Tusculum a centre of hospitality and, after Government House, it was the most important domestic building in the colony. The Broughton papers contain several references to the unfinished state of the house when he moved in during 1836, and the alterations and improvements he undertook 'to bring the premises into a state of decency.'

Plan of the Tusculum Estate, 1842

In Broughton's early years at Tusculum a garden was established – there are references to a kitchen garden, rose trees from England etc. In 1839 he had shelves put up for his library so that his books could be "released from captivity, and placed in security from damp and dust".

An interesting letter from Emily Crawley (née Broughton) to Phoebe Boydell, dated 22 September 1850, describes the accommodation arrangements at Tusculum for the Conference of Australasian Bishops held in October that year. Bishop Broughton lived at Tusculum from 1836 to 1851 – for almost the full length of his episcopacy. He appears to have been occasionally unsettled by his accommodation, with numerous references in his letters to his desire to relocate. Broughton had difficulty in obtaining suitable alternative accommodation, and became resigned to the circumstances of Tusculum.

Broughton took out another lease on the property for seven years in 1848 at £300 p.a. (letter to Coleridge, 16 February 1848) – 'lt is a sad, imperfect place and anything but episcopal in pretensions: but it is in a cheerful situation and good air, and answers my purposes tolerably well.'

By 1843 there was a serious financial crisis in the colony, and the Darlinghurst grantees suffered. They pressed for the freedom to subdivide their land, and Sydney's first exclusive suburb opened up to investors. From the early 1850s, the Gold Rush boosted the economy, and interest in the land available at Darlinghurst grew. The first subdivisions occurred around the edges of the original grants, with blocks of a size that allowed other grand houses to be built and new streets formed. In the 1870s, heavy land taxes imposed by the administration of the Premier, Sir Henry Parkes, led to another wave of subdivisions of the original grants. The late 19th century saw the final demise of the grounds surrounding the original villas, and in some cases, the villas themselves.

Broughton was no longer living at Tusculum in 1851, the year prior to his departure. Tusculum was then purchased by William Long.

==== Ownership by William Long ====
Tusculum, Macleay Street residence of the Long family, Potts Point, Sydney, ca. 1886-1888

The authorship of the substantial alterations undertaken at Tusculum for William Long is not certain. It is likely that John Frederick Hilly may have been the architect. Hilly did a lot of work in the Potts Point, Darlinghurst and Woolloomooloo areas and owned a local quarry. The cast iron balustrade design on the verandahs at Tusculum is very similar to those at Fiona, Edgecliff (1864), Guntawang (1869–70) and the Prince of Wales Theatre (1863) all works of Hilly.

==== Ownership, 1904 to 1983 ====
Tusculum was auctioned on 21 October 1904. Lewis Edward Isaacs bid £3,750 for Lot 1 which included the house. Isaacs engaged the architect, John Burcham Clamp to undertake extensive alterations to the staircase and stair hall and a tender was let to Mr. John White. Tusculum was purchased by Orwell and Alfred Phillips in 1906. Orwell later purchased his brother's share in the property. It is likely that Burcham Clamp was also responsible for the Billiard Room addition. He did other work for the Phillips family (such as a house at Moss Vale, c. 1915).

In the 1920s and 1930s, the original villas and the later grand 19th century residences were demolished to make way for blocks of flats, hotels and later, soaring towers of units. Today only 5 of the original 17 villas still stand, with the lost villas and other grand houses commemorated in the names of the streets of Potts Point, Darlinghurst and Kings Cross.

Following its use as a serviceman's club during World War II and a private nursing home, the building fell into disrepair and was the subject of a compulsory resumption in 1983, being the first under the provisions of the (then) recently gazetted NSW Heritage Act 1977.

==== Lease by the Royal Australian Institute of Architects ====
Subsequently, the NSW Chapter of the Royal Australian Institute of Architects (RAIA) leased Tusculum for 99 years, on the condition that it will be responsible as custodian for the restoration and maintenance of the building and for making it available for public enjoyment. In addition, the NSW Government sold the freehold of the back section of the Tusculum site to the RAIA and the Heritage Council gave permission for a new building to be constructed adjoining the villa. The new building, which was the subject of a national competition, won by the architectural firm Levine & Durbach, houses the RAIA and subsidiary organisations, a 143-seat auditorium, and offices.

The restored villa is used for meeting rooms, a gallery and for receptions.

The two buildings operate as one complex, a combination of restored nineteenth century heritage and quality 1980s architecture. Clive Lucas, OBE, FRAIA, a prominent conservation architect and the leading authority on John Verge was commissioned by the RAIA to undertake the conservation work. The restoration is intended to evoke the early to mid Victorian period and was completed in 1987 in accordance with the "Draft Conservation Policy" in Reference 1. Both buildings were officially opened by the Premier of NSW on 11 March 1988.

Former prime minister Paul Keating assisted the RAIA in lobbying the City of Sydney for a lease over Tusculum and subsequently leased an office suite in the building.

== Description ==
Tusculum is a large two storey Colonial Regency mansion designed by John Verge, built 1831–35. Constructed from stuccoed brickwork it is surrounded on three sides by a fine Classical two storey verandah of the Ionic order, probably built sometime in the 1870s. Cedar of interiors imported from Lebanon; marble for flooring and chimney pieces imported from Tusculum in Italy. High shuttered French doors open on the broad verandahs. Original low pitched slate roof is now covered with tiles. (Australian Heritage Commission, Register of the National Estate).

Tusculum is one of the few remaining Regency houses remaining in Sydney. It is one of the few colonial houses to display the attributes of a villa with basement offices and stair.

It was reported to be in very good condition as at 12 January 2005. It retains significant components of the original Verge design, with overlays of other periods particularly 1870s verandah rework and internal stair modifications dating to Edwardian times. Accretions removed in 1980s conservation work include fire-damage.

== Heritage listing ==
The principal cultural significance of Tusculum is its use as a residence by William Grant Broughton, first Bishop of Australia from 1836 to 1847, (1847–1852, Bishop of Sydney), during almost the entire period of his episcopacy. After Government House, it assumed the status of the most important domestic building in the colony. Designed by the prominent architect, John Verge for entrepreneur A.B. Spark, it was one of the first villas to be erected on Woolloomooloo Hill, as part of an elaborate attempt by the Colonial Government to establish a prestigious enclave for the gentry in the 1830s. It has very strong historical and architectural associations with its contemporary neighbour Rockwall, also designed by Verge. This pair are among a handful of colonial villas to have survived.

Apart from Bishop Broughton, the house is associated with many other prominent Sydney figures including Spark, a colonial merchant whose rapid rise and decline with the collapse of the Bank of Australia mirrored the depression of the 1840s.

The house signified the rise to respectability of the emancipist and former publican, William Long and his son William Alexander Long (responsible for major alterations and additions in the 1860s), It was associated with the politician the Hon Henry Edward Kater; the prominent lawyer Sir James Martin, the Lord Mayor of Sydney Sir William Manning and Orwell Phillips.

It is one of the few colonial houses in Sydney to display the attributes of a villa, with basement work areas and stair, demonstrating the "upstairs/downstairs" nature of domestic administration, typical of nineteenth century English houses.

It is an example of the transformation of a Regency villa of high architectural quality into a mid-Victorian Italianate mansion.

Tusculum was listed on the New South Wales State Heritage Register on 2 April 1999 having satisfied the following criteria.

The place is important in demonstrating the course, or pattern, of cultural or natural history in New South Wales.

Designed by the famous architect John Verge, Tusculum is one of the finest Regency mansions in Sydney remaining from the early Colonial period. It was built between 1831–35 for wealthy merchant A B Spark but its first occupant was Bishop Broughton, first Bishop of Australia. The building retains important historical associations with many famous people of the early Colonial era. Together with its neighbour "Rockwall", also by John Verge, Tusculum was one of the first villas built on Woolloomooloo Hill as part of the Colonial Government's attempt to establish a prestigious enclave for the gentry in the 1830s. It retains strong historical and architectural associations with Rockwall, one of the few other colonial villas to have survived.

The place is important in demonstrating aesthetic characteristics and/or a high degree of creative or technical achievement in New South Wales.

A building of elegant detail and proportion, Tusculum retains strong associations with Rockwall, as two related works by the one architect in the same locale. Tusculum is one of the few colonial houses to display the attributes of a villa, with basement service rooms and stair. It is an excellent example of the transformation of a Regency villa of high architectural quality into a mid-Victorian Italianate mansion.

The place has a strong or special association with a particular community or cultural group in New South Wales for social, cultural or spiritual reasons.

During its occupation by Bishop Broughton, it assumed the status of the most important domestic building in the colony, after Government House. As a social document, Tusculum demonstrates the "upstairs / downstairs" nature of domestic administration, typical of nineteenth century English houses.

In its association with A B Spark, it symbolises a rise in his fortune in the 1820s, financial decline with the collapse of the Bank of Australia, through to the depression of the 1840s. It is the principal physical manifestation of the life of the emancipist William Long and his family whose occupation, alterations and substantial additions indicate his rise to fortune social acceptance as a merchant.

Tusculum was one of a few buildings to achieve recognition in the early twentieth century as a residence of significance reflecting a growing maturity. Its resumption by the New South Wales Government was the first instance of the application of the provisions of the NSW Heritage Act, 1977 and indicates awareness and acceptance of the principles of heritage conservation. In the custody of the Royal Australian Institute of Architects NSW Chapter, Tusculum has been restored to evoke the early to mid-Victorian period. It is accessible to the public through public openings and through its use as a conference and meeting venue in association with the activities of the RAIA.

The place has potential to yield information that will contribute to an understanding of the cultural or natural history of New South Wales.

The site offers potential to explore the construction techniques and materials of Colonial Sydney and of later periods and as an example for comparative analysis of a rare villa design.

The place possesses uncommon, rare or endangered aspects of the cultural or natural history of New South Wales.

One of a handful of colonial villas and a rare surviving work of John Verge, a prominent architect of colonial times.

== See also ==
- Australian residential architectural styles
