= Potts Point =

Suburb in Sydney, Australia

- Suburb
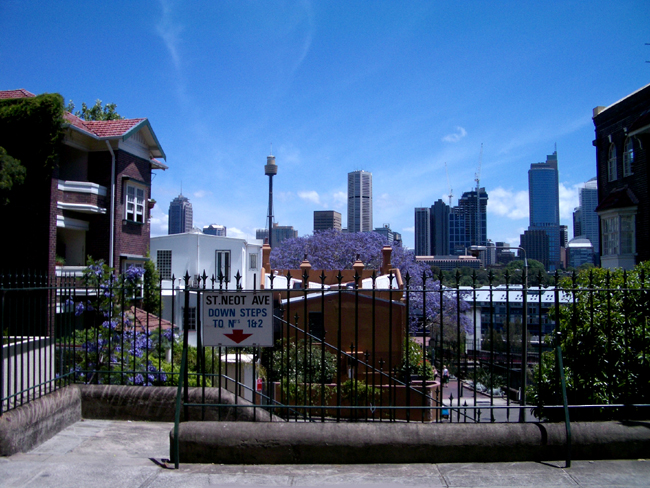
- View across Potts Point to the Sydney CBD from St Neot Avenue. 2004

- Interactive map of Potts Point
- Coordinates: 33°52′5″S 151°13′27″E
- Country: Australia
- State: New South Wales
- City: Sydney
- LGA: City of Sydney
- Location: 3 km (1.9 mi) east of Sydney CBD

Government
  - State electorate: Sydney
  - Federal division: Wentworth

Area
  - Total: 0.62 km^{2} (0.24 sq mi)

Population
  - Total: 7,183 (SAL 2021)
  - Density: 11,493/km^{2} (29,770/sq mi)
- Postcode: 2011
Suburbs around Potts Point
	Port Jackson
Woolloomooloo	Potts Point	Elizabeth Bay
Darlinghurst	Darlinghurst	Rushcutters Bay

Potts Point is a small and densely populated suburb in inner-city Sydney, New South Wales, Australia. Potts Point is located 2 kilometres (1.2 mi) east of the Sydney central business district and is part of the local government area of the City of Sydney.

Potts Point sits on a ridge immediately east of Woolloomooloo, west of Elizabeth Bay and Rushcutters Bay and north of Darlinghurst. The suburb has a roughly trapezoidal shape, and at its greatest extent is no more than 1 kilometre (0.62 mi) long by 200 metres (660 ft) wide. The suburb's boundaries include Macleay Street to the east, Darlinghurst Road to the southeast, William Street to the south, Brougham Street and part of Cowper Wharf Roadway to the west.

== Kings Cross and Garden Island ==
Kings Cross is not an officially designated suburb of Sydney, but rather a locality encompassed entirely by the suburbs of Potts Point and Elizabeth Bay. Kings Cross is a commercial area that was once dominated by bars, restaurants, nightclubs, strip clubs and adult bookstores.

Kings Cross railway station is situated beneath Darlinghurst Road, and the Garden Island facility of the Royal Australian Navy sits on the north end of Potts Point.

== History ==
Potts Point is named for Joseph Hyde Potts, who was employed by the Bank of New South Wales. He purchased six-and-a-half acres of harbourside land in an area then known as Woolloomooloo Hill – which he renamed Potts Point.

Much of the area that today comprises Potts Point and the adjacent suburb of Elizabeth Bay, originally constituted part of a land grant to Alexander Macleay, who was the New South Wales Colonial Secretary from 1826 to 1837, and for whom Macleay Street is named. NSW Judge Advocate, John Wylde (for whom Wylde Street is named) was another 19th-century public servant who owned land in the area. Potts Point is mentioned in the poem William Street by notable Australian poet Henry Lawson.

=== 19th century ===
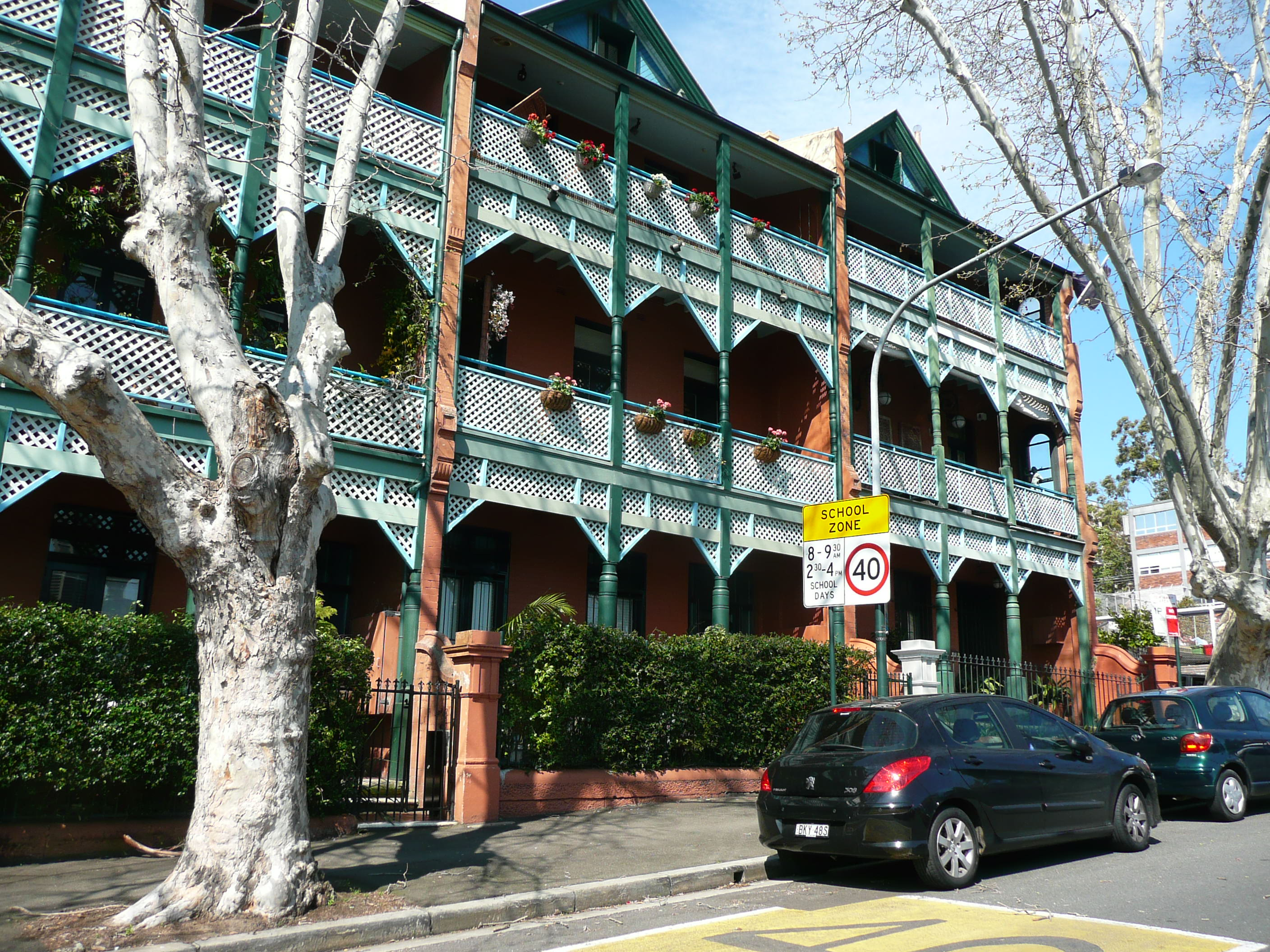
Terraced homes, Victoria Street

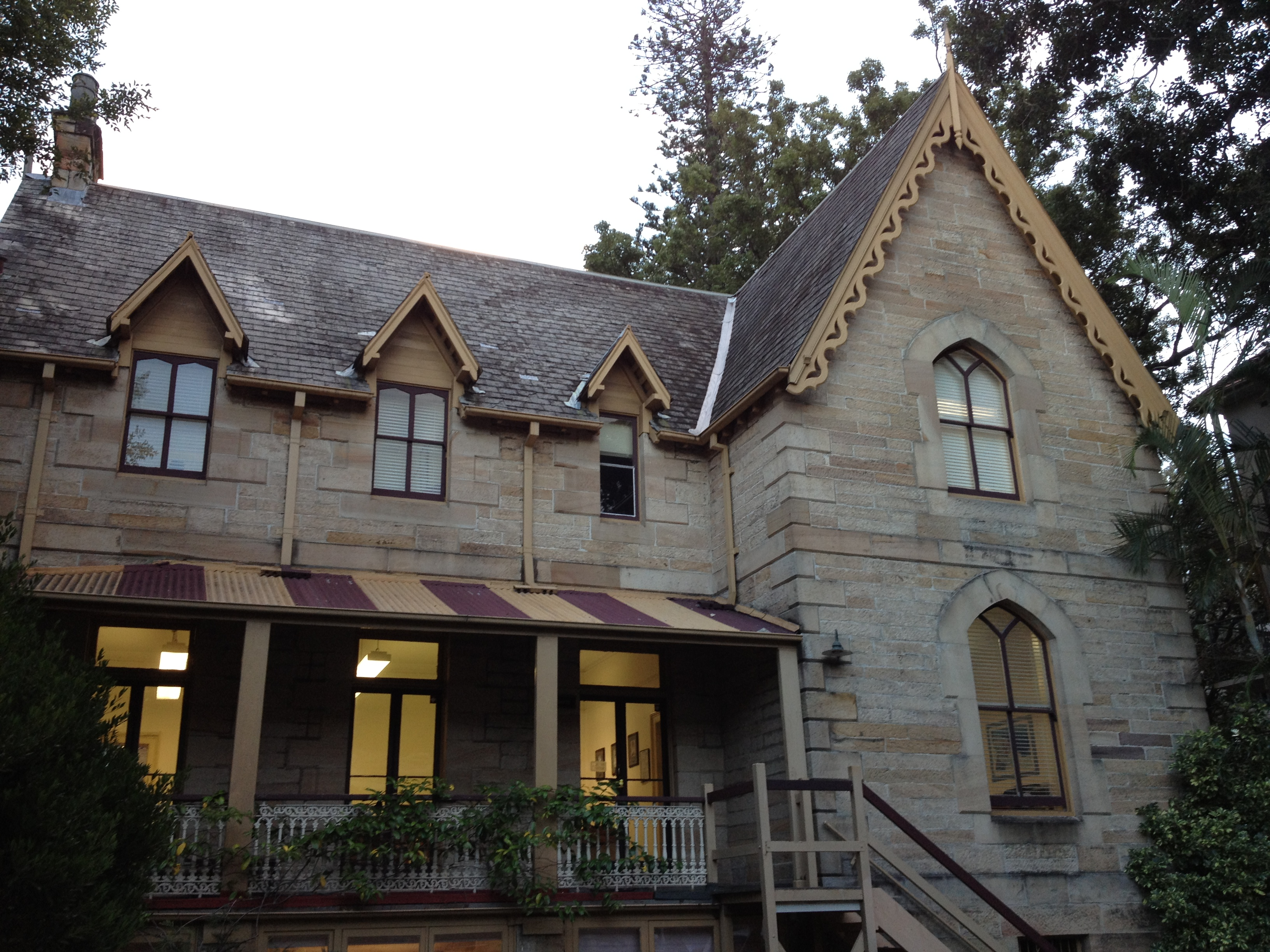
Kenilworth, Roslyn Street

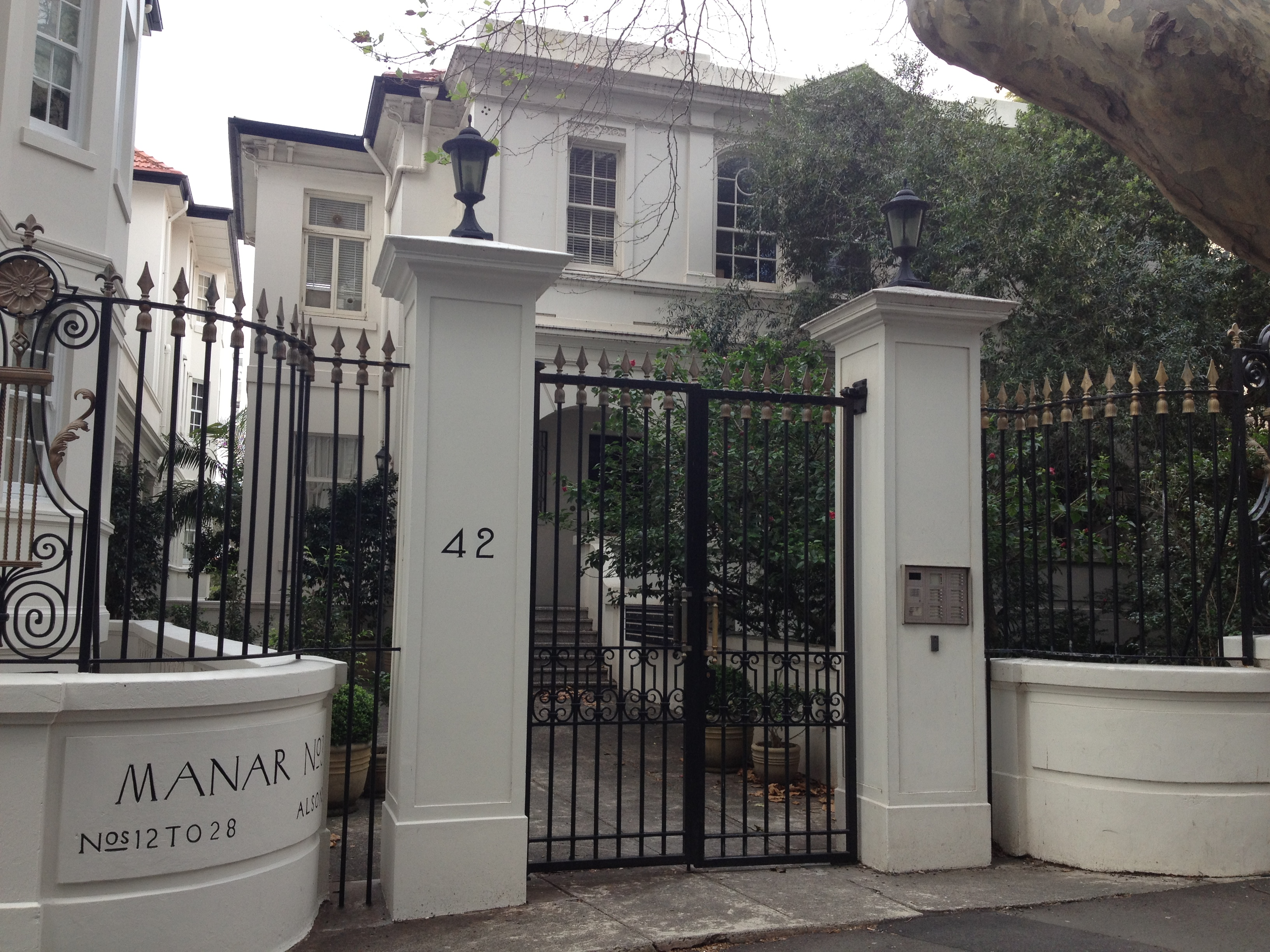
Manar, Macleay Street

The area was further subdivided after Macleay's time, and a number of grand Georgian mansions were built along the high point of the suburb's ridge line. Several of these survive (albeit much hemmed in by later buildings), including Rockwall and Tusculum. Rockwall, located in Rockwall Crescent, is a two-storey (plus cellar) sandstone villa with five bays and a verandah that encircles the house. It was one of the earlier homes designed by architect John Verge and was built from 1831 to 1837. It is the only one of these which has a garden and is in private ownership.

Tusculum, located in Manning Street, is a two-storey Regency mansion that was also designed by John Verge. His client was the merchant A. B. Spark, for whom the house was built in 1831–35. It was a twin to Rockwell House and was enlarged in the 1870s by the addition of verandahs on three sides. The first tenant was Bishop William Broughton.

Kenilworth, was built on land that was originally part of the 1831 grant to Thomas Barker and was once a neighbour Barker's house, Rosyln Hall.

The Roslyn Hall estate was subdivided into seven lots in 1860 and Roslyn Street was created. Around 1869, Kenilworth was built for Henry Williams. It remained in the hands of its original family until 1944 when it was sold to St Luke's Hospital.

Manar, in Macleay Street, is a complex of three blocks of flats which dates back from the original house c.1880 through to the Inter-war Free Classical style buildings of the 1920s. They are two to three stories in height with cement rendered masonry walls and terracotta tiles roofs. The 1920s wings were designed by the architectural practice of Ernest A Scott and Green (1911–1932), later known as Scott Green and Scott (1932–1947). Residents of Manar have included William Parker who served as Master in Lunacy in the Supreme Court of New South Wales, Sir Mungo William MacCallum, Sydney Ure Smith, Sir Garfield Barwick, Senator John Ignatius Armstrong, Mary McEwen, widow of Sir John McEwen, and Mary Bailey-Tart, the only daughter of Sir Earle Page

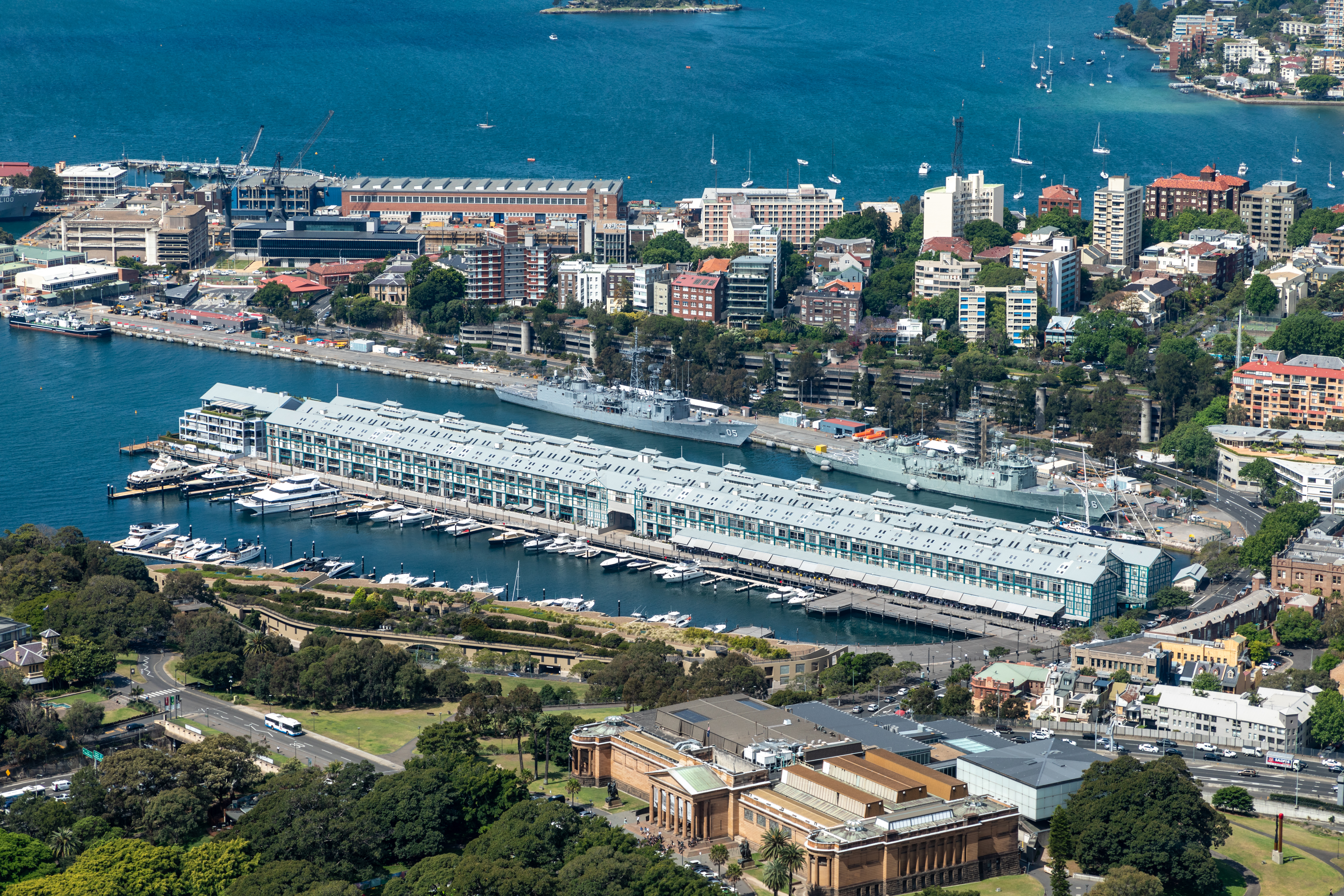
Finger Wharf and HMAS Kuttabul naval base. 2019

Other heritage buildings in the area include the Mansions Terrace in Bayswater Road; the terrace and townhouse group extending from 13 to 29 Challis Avenue; the group of Late Victorian terraces from 1–13 Kellett Street; the gazebo in HMAS Kuttabul; and Bomera and Tarana on the corner of Wylde Street and Cowper Wharf Roadway. These buildings are all listed on the Register of the National Estate.

In 1871, Edmund Blacket built Stramshall in Macleay Street for the Hordern family of merchants. Thomas Rowe made further additions in 1877. The house was later known as Jenner House and was taken over by the Department of Defence, who sold it to the horse breeder Tony Peterson in 1998. Peterson sold the house for $15 million in 2009. It was listed by the National Trust in 1967.

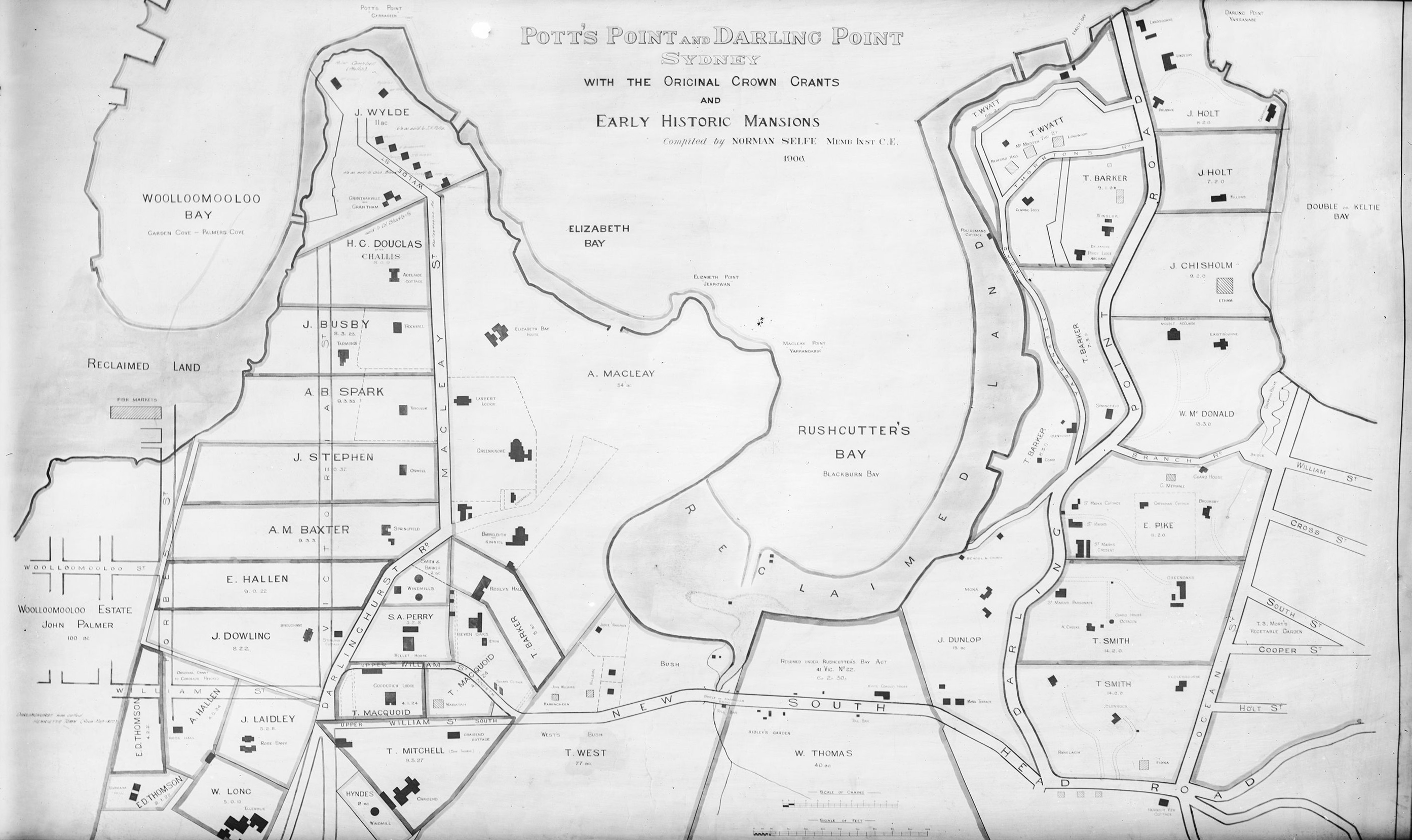
Map of historic mansions and original land grants at Potts and Darling Points (1906)

Most of the other mansions, such as Orwell, have survived only as street names. The area also boasts many fine Victorian-era terraces. These are chiefly located along Victoria Street, which bisects Potts Point from north to south, and is widely known for its impressive canopy of plane trees.

=== 20th century ===
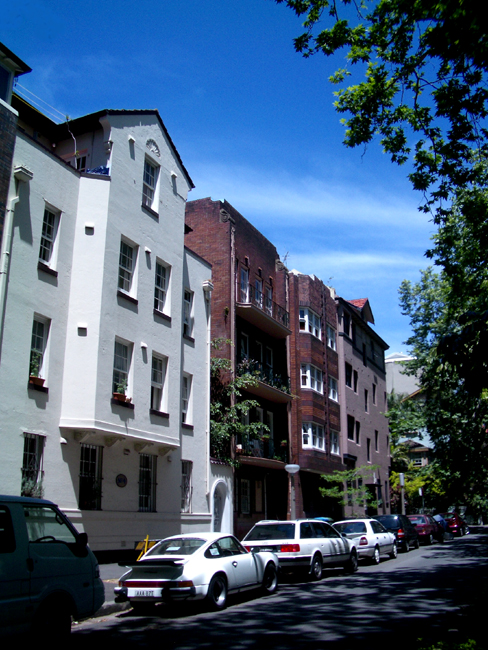
Tusculum Street, Art Deco and Spanish Mission style flats

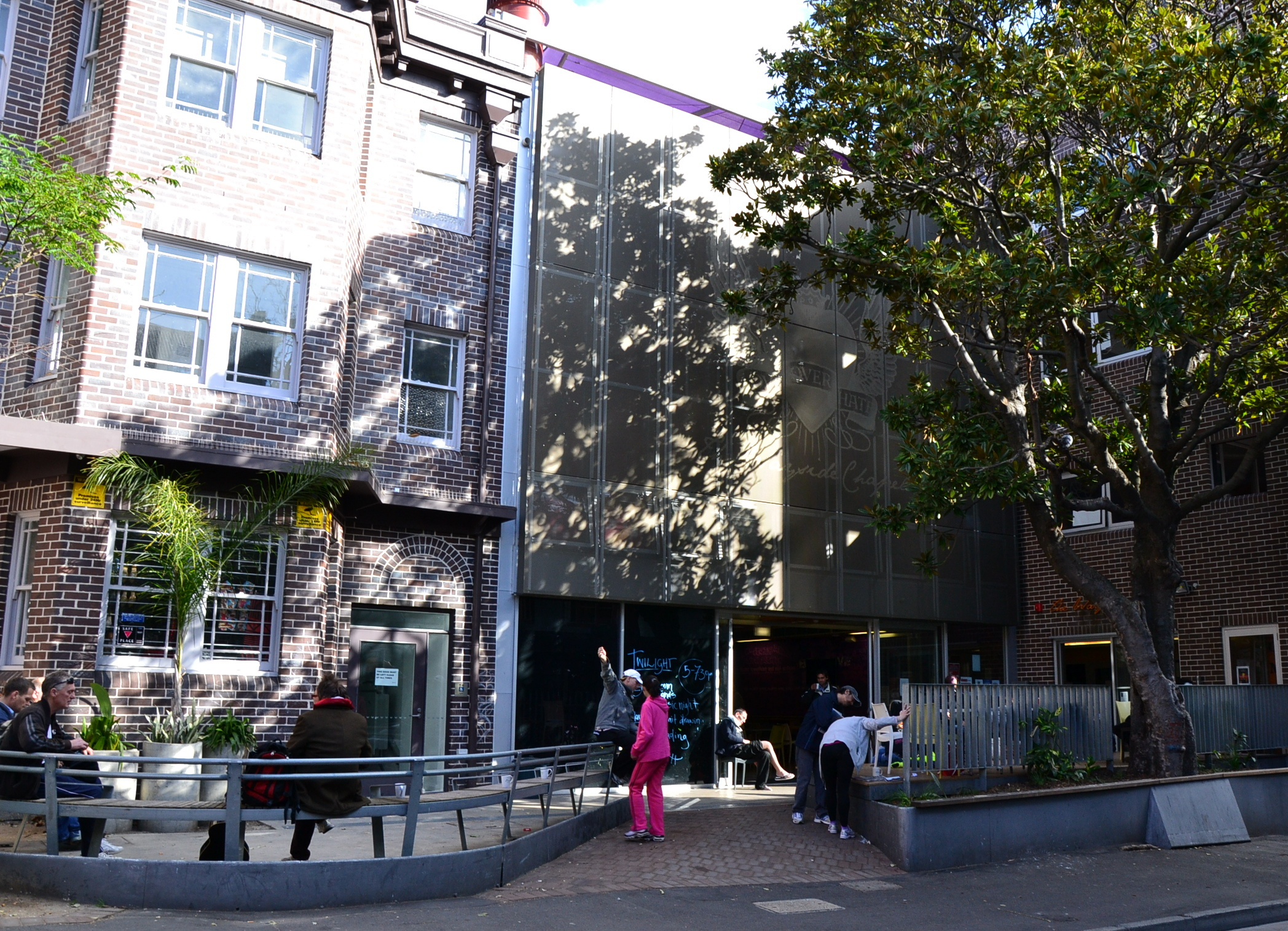
Wayside Chapel, Hughes Street

Potts Point was the site of some of Australia's earliest blocks of flats, and from the 1920s through to World War II the area was intensively developed along those lines. As a result, it boasts the highest concentration of Art Deco architecture in Australia. Amongst the most notable examples are the Macleay Regis, Cahors and Franconia residential buildings in Macleay Street, and Carinthia and Carisbrooke in Springfield Avenue.

Two notable Streamline Moderne buildings in Australia: the Minerva (or Metro) Theatre and the Minerva Building are in Orwell Street. The Metro Theatre (as it was then known) was designed by Bruce Dellit and built in 1940. It was the site of the first Australian production of the musical Hair in 1970, and is heritage-listed.

During the Vietnam War, the Darlinghurst Road precinct (commonly known as Kings Cross), which straddles Potts Point and Elizabeth Bay, became a popular destination for US military personnel on R&R, due chiefly to its proximity to a major naval facility. Partially as a result of this, the area attracted organised crime syndicates and developed an unsavoury reputation as Australia's drugs and prostitution capital. Dozens of hotels constructed at the time ensured that "The Cross" remained a tourism mecca well into the 1990s.

In 1964, the Rev. Ted Noffs started the Wayside Chapel, an unorthodox Methodist ministry to the Kings Cross area. It began as a small drop-in centre in a block of flats at 29 Hughes Street, and grew into a complex that occupies two blocks of flats. It is a major welfare and community centre in the area.

=== 21st century ===
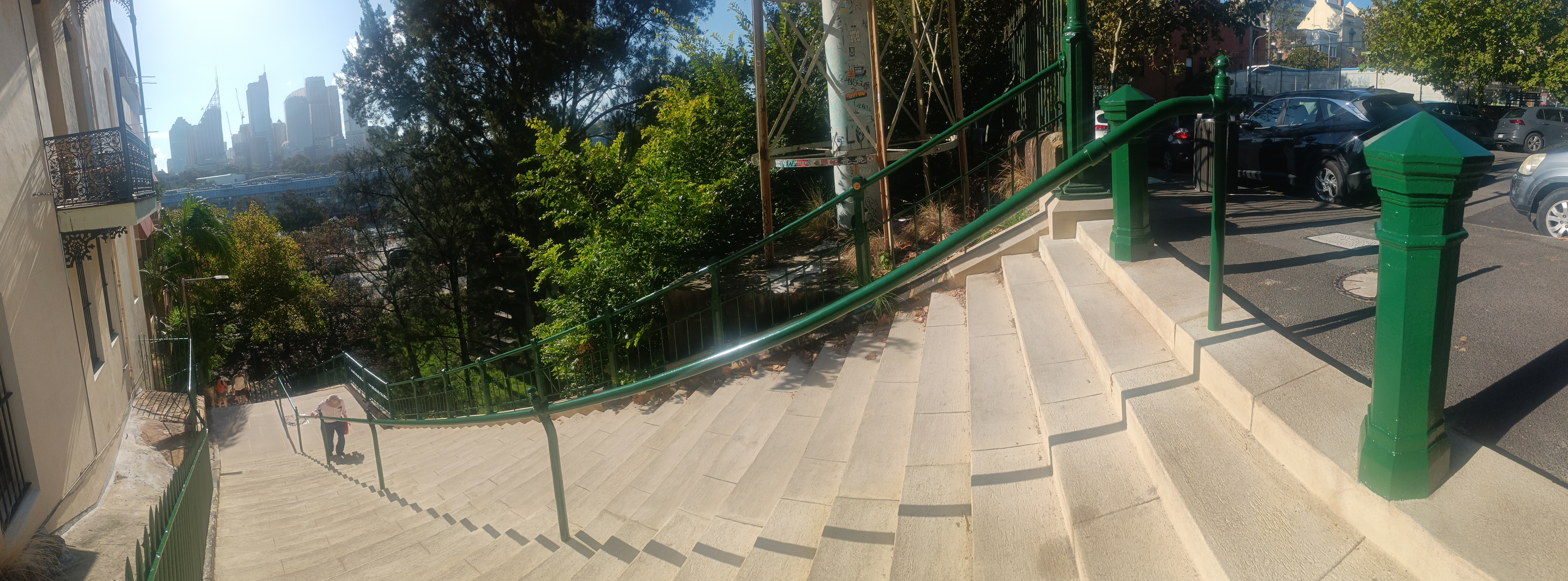
McElhone steps leading down to Woolloomooloo from Potts Point. 2026

At the turn of the 21st century, almost all of Potts Point's hotels were acquired by developers attracted by the area's proximity to transportation and amenities. By 2004 most tourist hotels had been converted or rebuilt as expensive unit developments, resulting in a rapid wider gentrification of the area and increasingly large numbers of gay residents that make up a significant portion of affluent same-sex couples in Australia although the continued presence of a number of large and small backpacker hostels in Victoria Street and surrounding streets and dozens of pubs, nightclubs, restaurants and similar venues have confirmed the suburb's role as one of Sydney's leading entertainment precincts.

From 2003 to 2004, the City of Sydney undertook a major streetscape upgrade centred on Darlinghurst Road and the southern part of Macleay Street, involving footpath-widening, roadside tree-plantings and the installation of new paving, street furniture and lighting. Plans to force the replacement of historic neon shopfront and awning signage on strip clubs and other adult commercial premises in the area with generic signage proved more controversial and have not been implemented.

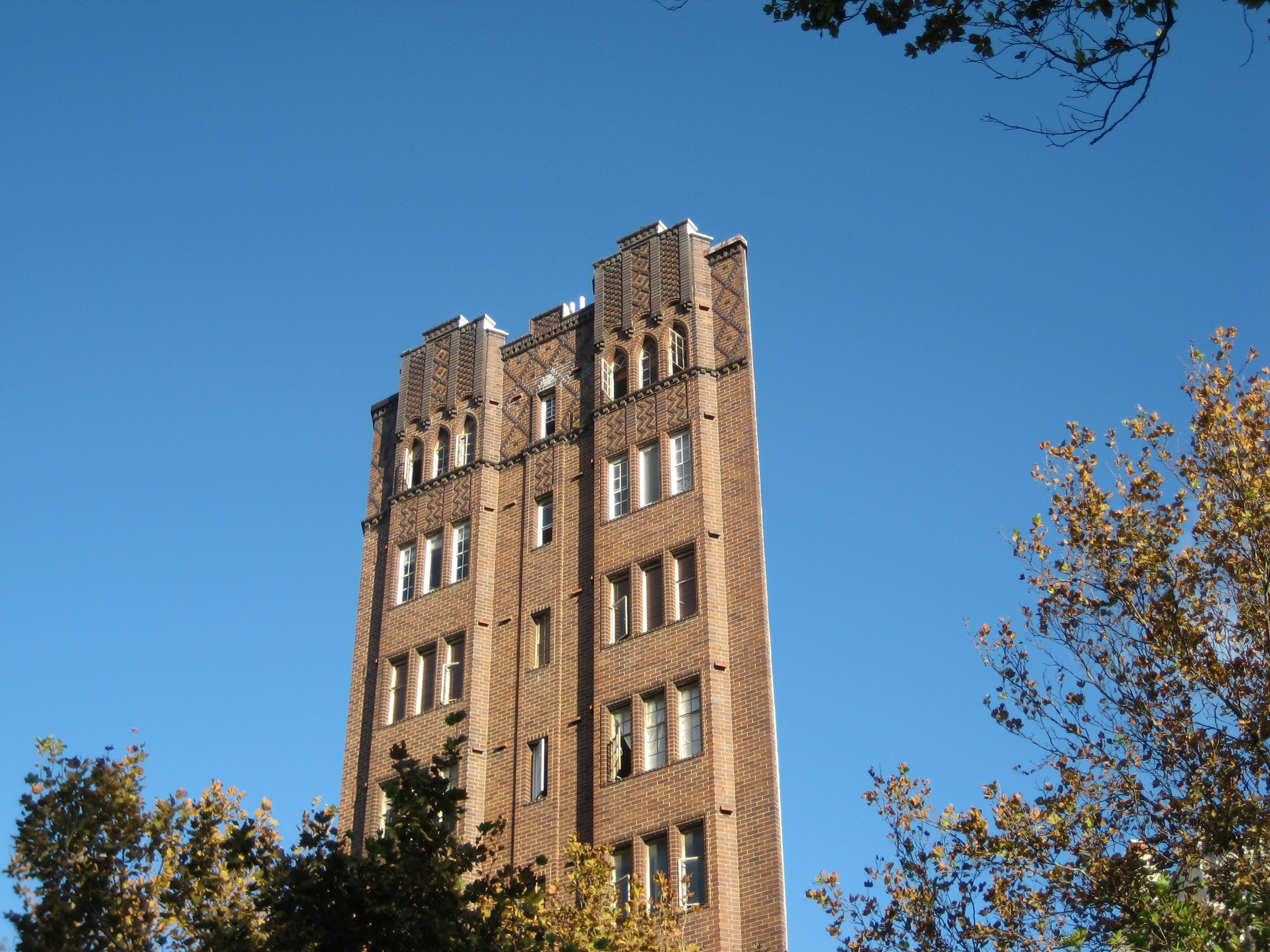
Art deco residential architecture in the Potts Point area. 2008.

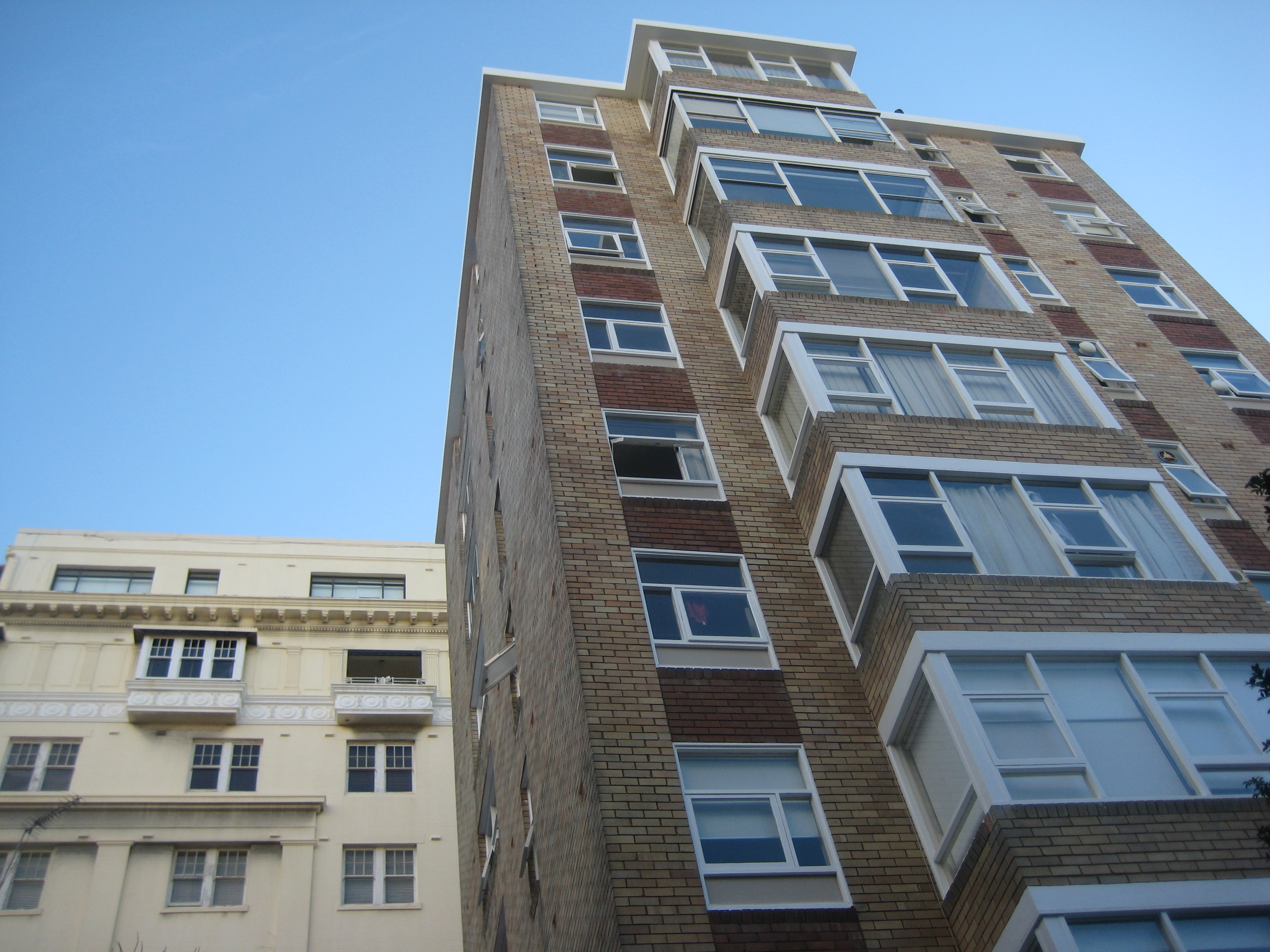
Modernist residential architecture in the Potts Point area. 2009.

== Heritage listings ==
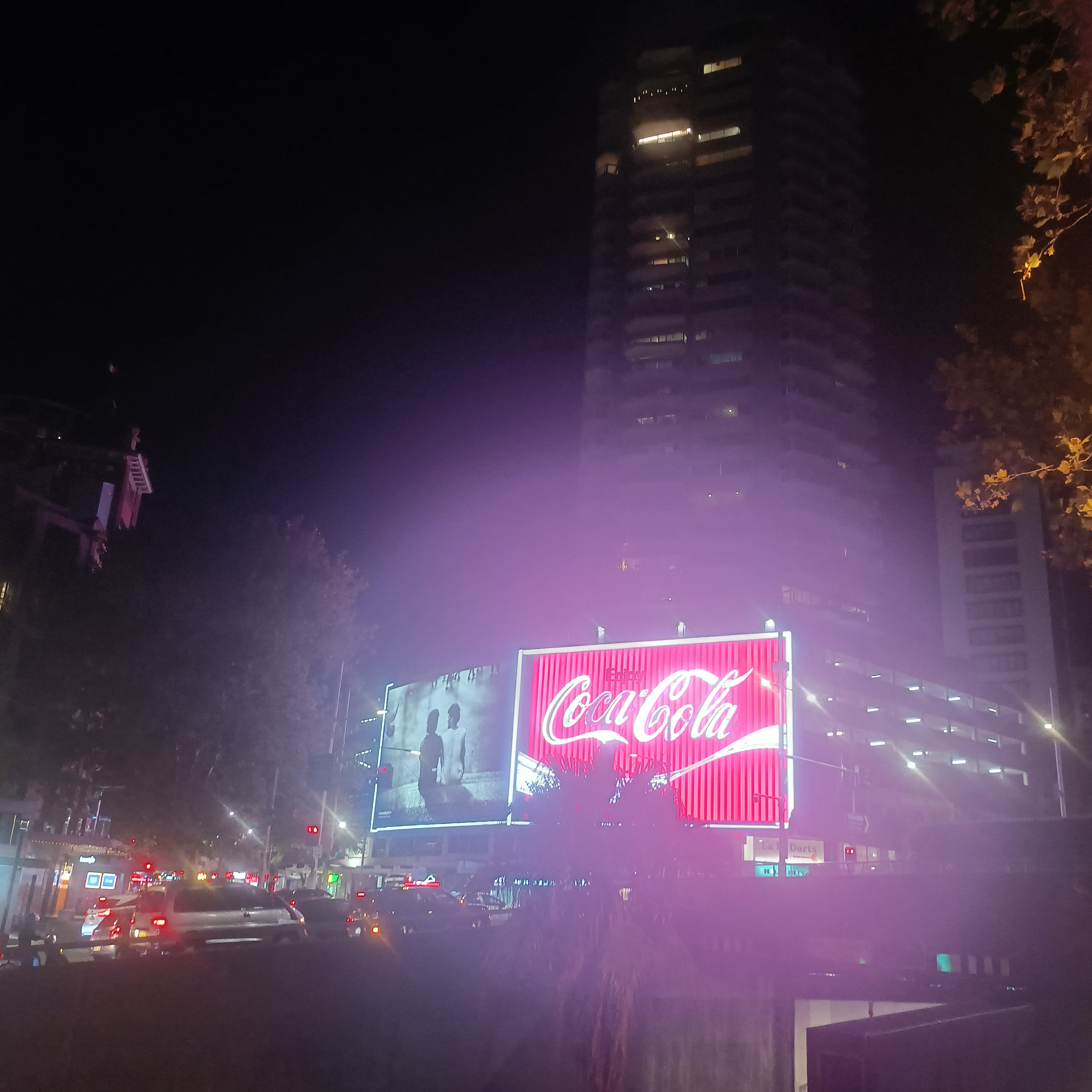
The Coca-Cola billboard on the corner of William street and Darlinghurst road was first installed in 1974 and in 2015 the original neon sign was removed. In 2016 the new sign was turned on and it uses a lot less power by making use of LED tubing. 2026.

Potts Point has a number of heritage-listed sites, including:

- 2 Macleay Street: Jenner House
- 1–3 Manning Street: Tusculum
- 7 Rockwall Crescent: Rockwall
- 55 Victoria Street: 55 Victoria Street
- 202 Victoria Street: Juanita Nielsen's House
- 18 Ward Avenue: Oakleigh
- 1 Wylde Street: Bomera and Tarana

== Population ==
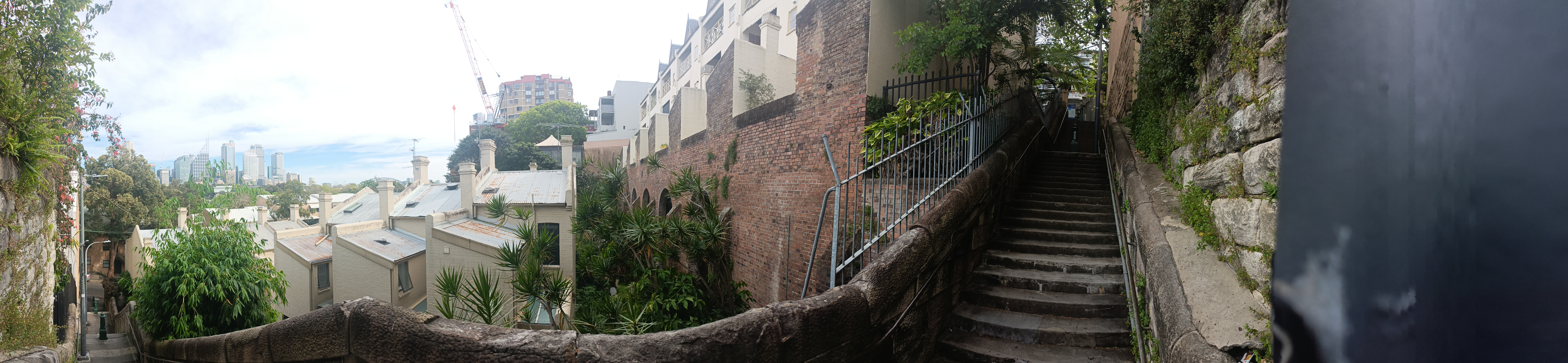
The Butler stairs going down to Woolloomooloo from Potts Point. 2025

At the 2021 census, 7,183 people were recorded living in Potts Point. 50.0% of people were born in Australia. The most common countries of birth were England 5.8%, New Zealand 4.1%, United States of America 2.2%, France 1.4% and Thailand 1.3%. 70.3% of people only spoke English at home. Other languages spoken at home included Spanish 2.1%, French 1.8%, Mandarin 1.2%, Italian 1.1% and Thai 1.0%. The most common responses for religion were No Religion 50.0%, Catholic 15.7%, Not stated 13.9%, Anglican 5.6% and Buddhism 2.7%.

In the 2016 census, there were 9,423 people in Potts Point. 38.2% of people were born in Australia. The most common countries of birth were England 5.3%, New Zealand 3.5%, United States of America 1.6%, France 1.2% and Italy 1.2%. 54.0% of people only spoke English at home. Other languages spoken at home included Spanish 1.5%, Italian 1.5% and French 1.5%. The most common response for religion was No Religion at 35.1%.

== Transport ==
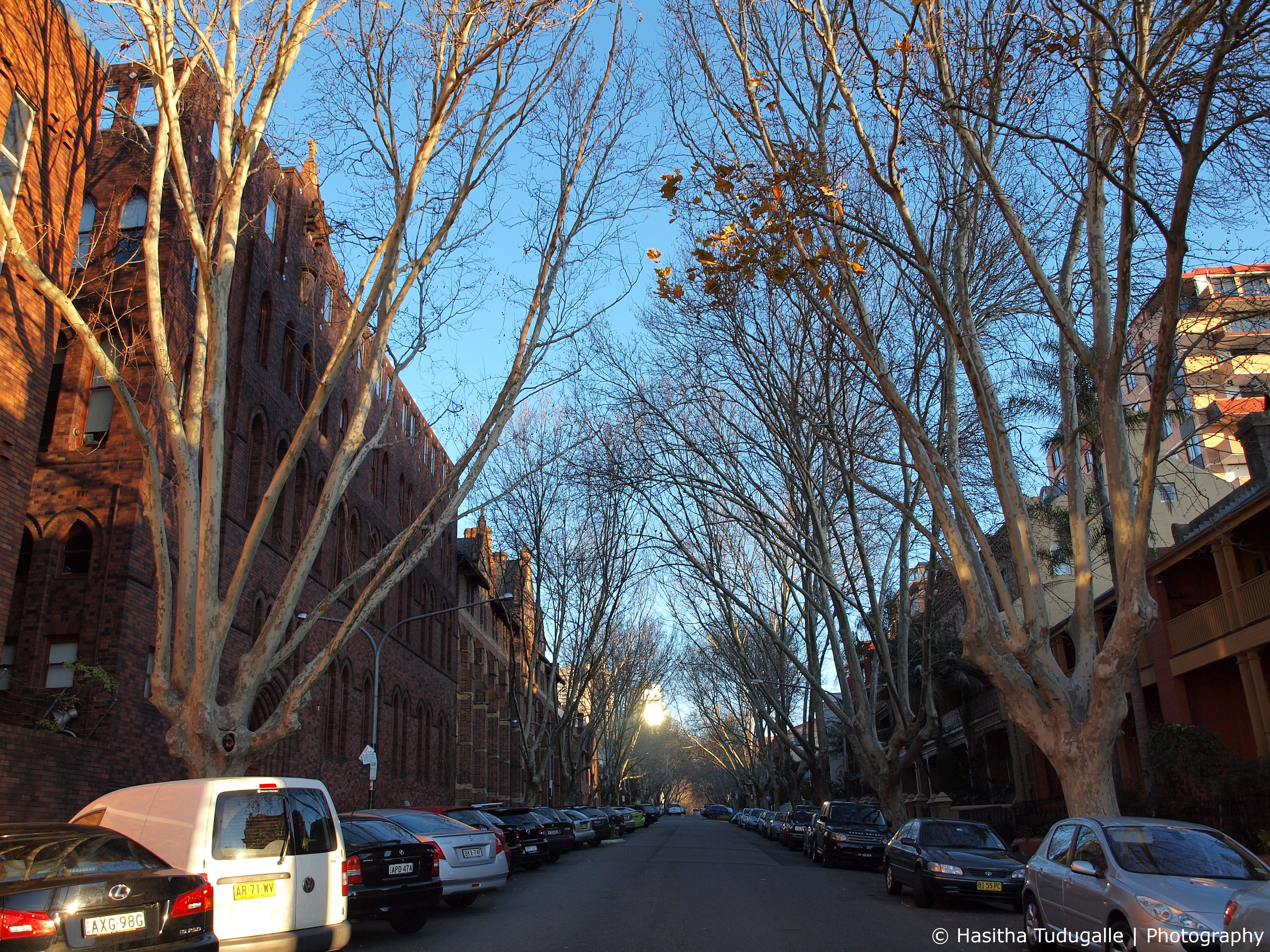
Victoria Street showing an avenue of plane trees. 2011

Kings Cross railway station is an underground station at Potts Point, on the Eastern Suburbs railway line of the Sydney Trains network. The area is well served by buses, with routes 200, 311, 324, and 325, and night-time routes 300 and N91, passing through Potts Point.

Potts Point can be accessed on foot from Woolloomooloo. A number of stairways connect the two neighbouring suburbs: Butler and Hills Stairs (103 and 24 steps, respectively), McElhone Stairs (113 steps) – also known as the "Stairs of Doom" or "Stairs of Death" by locals – and Horderns Stairs.

== Politics ==
Potts Point has been administered by Sydney City Council since March 2004. Prior to this it was administered alternately by South Sydney Council and Sydney City Council at various periods throughout its history.
