= Kenilworth, Potts Point =

Kenilworth
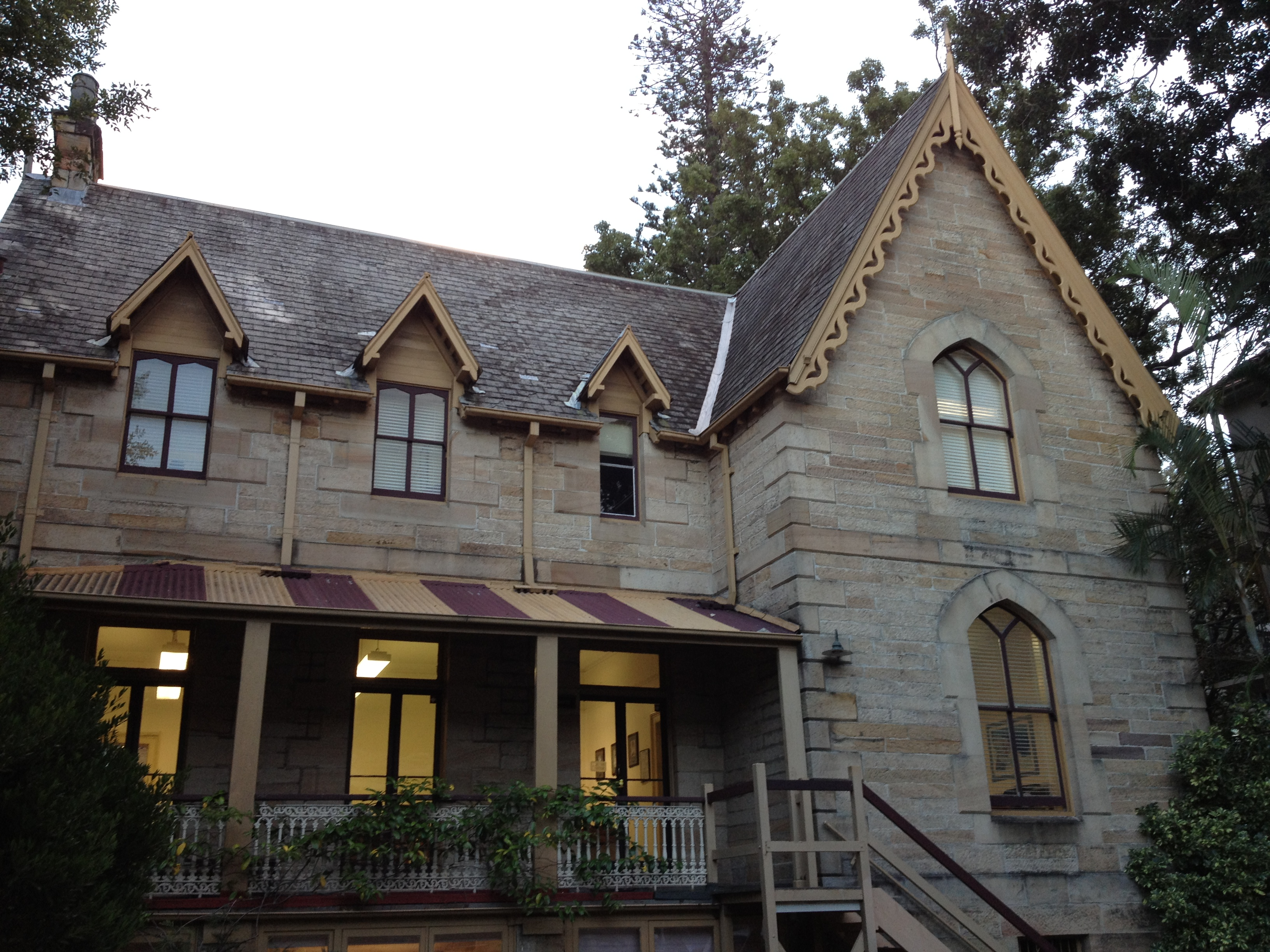
- The north eastern facade of Kenilworth
- Interactive map of the Kenilworth area

General information
- Type: House
- Architectural style: Victorian Rustic Gothic Revival
- Location: Roslyn Street, Potts Point, New South Wales, Australia
- Coordinates: 33°52′30″S 151°13′33″E
- Completed: 1869
- Client: Henry Williams
- Owner: St Luke's Care (since 1944)

Technical details
- Material: Sydney sandstone

New South Wales Heritage Database (Local Government Register)
- Official name: St Luke's Hospital Group including buildings and their interiors, sandstone gates, pillars and grounds
- Type: Built
- Criteria: a., b., c., d., g.
- Designated: 14 December 2012
- Reference no.: Local register
- Group/collection: Health Services
- Category: Hospital

Kenilworth is a historic house in the Sydney suburb of Potts Point, New South Wales, Australia. Completed in 1869 in the Victorian Rustic Gothic Revival style, the sandstone house is now part of St Luke's Care.

== History ==
Kenilworth was built on land that was originally part of the 1831 grant to Thomas Barker and Alexander Macleay. Both men built houses on their land and Macleay's Elizabeth Bay House still survives. Barker's house, Rosyln Hall, was designed by Ambrose Hallen but was demolished in 1937. The Roslyn Hall estate was subdivided into seven lots in 1860 and Roslyn Street was created. Around 1869, Kenilworth was built for Henry Williams and the 1882 Rates Assessment described it "as being of two floors with twelve rooms of stone with a shingle roof." The two-storey sandstone Victorian Gothic style building has a high pitched eternity slate roof with stone gables. it has timber framed double hung sash windows with pointed upper panes. The main entrance faces Roslyn Street to the south west.

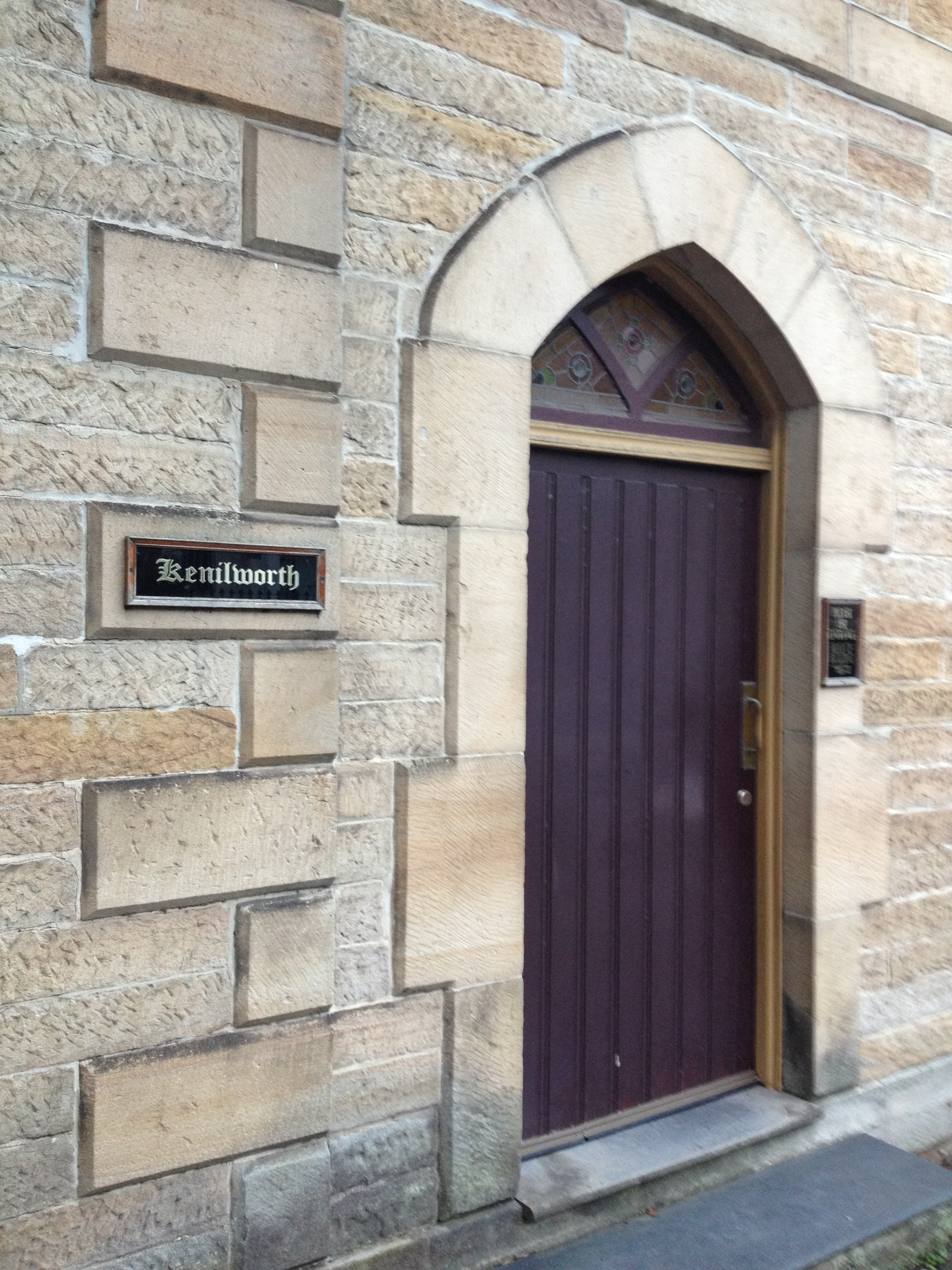
The front door

The north eastern facade has a single storey timber verandah on a sandstone columned under croft and would originally have had views of Rushcutters Bay. This lower colonnade has now been glazed. A later two-storey extension to the south east is built in rendered masonry with coursing lines and a castellated parapet and flat roof. Kenilworth remained in the hands of its original family until 1944 when it was sold after the death of Henry Williams youngest daughter, Ethel, and her husband Arthur H. Friend.

St Luke's Care purchased the property for expansion. Since that time the upper two levels of the interior have remained relatively intact with original timber detailing but the basement has been altered and refurbished for its role as hospital and aged care offices. While much of the garden has been lost due to development in the last century, mature trees survive, including a Ficus rubiginosa and Araucaria columnaris.
