= Joseph Hyde Potts =

Joseph Hyde Potts (1793–1865) was an accountant and in 1817 was the first employee to be engaged by the Bank of New South Wales (now Westpac).

On 9 August 1834 he married Emma F. Bates (d.1901). The marriage was conducted by the Rev. William Cowper at fashionable St. Phillip's Church. They had four children: Joseph (b. 1835), Harriet (b. 1837), Francis (b. 1839) and Josephine (b. 1843).

In 1830 Potts acquired 64 acres (260,000 m^{2}) of land from Judge-Advocate John Wylde on what was previously known as Paddys Point and Woolloomooloo Hill and renamed it Potts Point. Potts purchased another 369 acres (1.49 km^{2}) in 1834, 470 acres (1.9 km^{2}) in 1835 and a further 625 acres (2.53 km^{2}) in 1835. Potts Hill reservoir and Potts Point are located on a large portion of Joseph Hyde Potts' original land.

In 1841 the Crown granted a further 256 acres (1.04 km^{2}) to Potts, who was at that time Secretary of the Bank of New South Wales, near where Homebush and Australian Catholic University's Mount Royal College campus is located at Strathfield is today.
