= Marrickville =

Suburb of Sydney, New South Wales, Australia

- Suburb
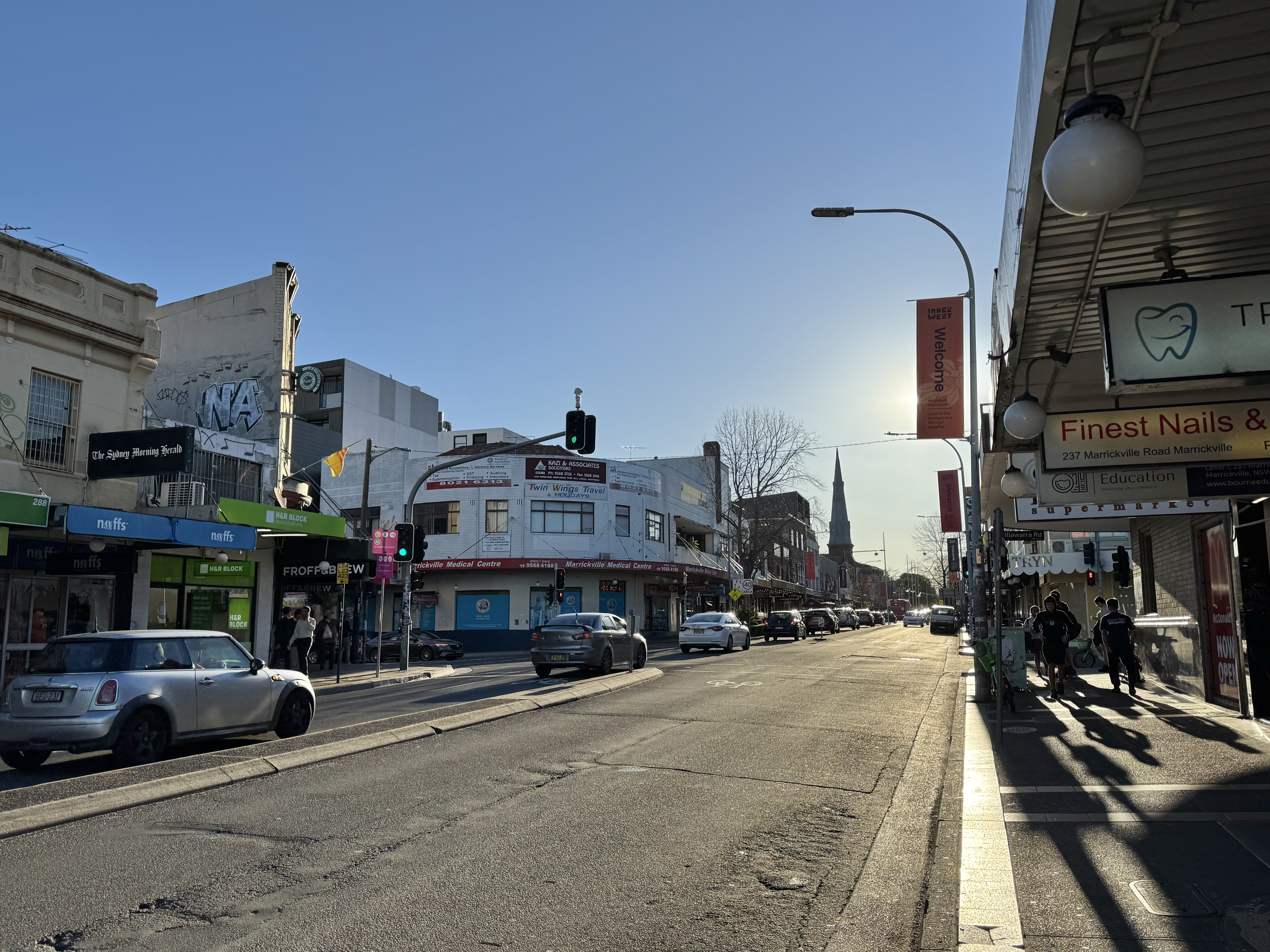
- Marrickville Road

- Interactive map of Marrickville
- Coordinates: 33°54′18″S 151°09′18″E
- Country: Australia
- State: New South Wales
- City: Sydney
- LGA: Inner West Council
- Location: 7 km (4.3 mi) south-west of Sydney CBD

Government
  - State electorates: Newtown; Summer Hill
  - Federal division: Grayndler

Area
  - Total: 5.77 km^{2} (2.23 sq mi)
- Elevation: 17 m (56 ft)

Population
  - Total: 26,570 (2021 census)
  - Density: 4,605/km^{2} (11,927/sq mi)
- Postcode: 2204
Suburbs around Marrickville
Petersham	Stanmore, Enmore	Newtown
Dulwich Hill	Marrickville	St Peters, Sydenham
Earlwood	Earlwood	Tempe

Marrickville is a suburb in the Inner West of Sydney, in New South Wales, Australia. Marrickville is located 7 kilometres (4 miles) south-west of the Sydney central business district and is the largest suburb in the Inner West Council local government area.

Marrickville sits on the northern bank of the Cooks River, opposite Earlwood and shares borders with Stanmore, Enmore, Newtown, St Peters, Sydenham, Tempe, Dulwich Hill, Hurlstone Park and Petersham. The southern part of the suburb, near the river, is known as Marrickville South and includes the historical locality called The Warren.

Marrickville is culturally diverse, and contains both low and high density residential, commercial and light industrial areas.

== Geography ==
Marrickville is a suburb in the Inner West of Sydney, Australia. Most of Marrickville is contained in a valley as part of the broader Cooks River basin.

The suburb's south-east has more foliage than elsewhere in the suburb. A path follows the Cooks River where many bird species live, including spoonbills, lorikeets, pelicans and some kingfishers.

== History ==
=== Early ===
The Cadigal people of the Eora Nation have lived in the area for tens of thousands of years, calling it Bulanaming. The Gumbramorra swamp, forming the eastern border of Marrickville, was an important source of bird and plant life for the Aboriginal people. Along the Cooks River, Richardson's lookout was an important observation point.

The first Europeans to use the area were escaped convicts, who hid in the difficult to navigate bushland and swamps. It was also known among early Europeans as a plentiful source of timber for boatmaking.

William Beckwith received the first land grant in the area in 1794, obtaining 100 acres (0.4 km^{2}). Between 1799 and 1804, Thomas Moore received 1,170 acres (4.7 km^{2}), using the land for timber. The barrister Robert Wardell later purchased Moore's land and more to create a 2,000 acres (8.1 km^{2}) estate. Like Moore, Wardell used his land for its timber, and also dealt with trespassers who fell trees and took their wood. He was murdered in September 1834 by escaped convicts, and his estate subdivided.

To the area now came stonemasons for the local sandstone and market farmers for the water supply. These new settlers came from a diverse range of countries, including China, Italy, Germany and Scotland. In 1855, the village of Marrickville was created with the subdivision of Thomas Chalder's Marrick Estate, attracting shops, churches and houses. The new village derived its name from Chalder's homeland of Marrick, England; the addition of -ville was suggested by another resident. Besides the market gardeners and stonemasons, the area was populated with professionals including members of parliament and architects. The surroundings still included bushland, but now also had dairy farms alongside the market gardens.

=== A municipality ===
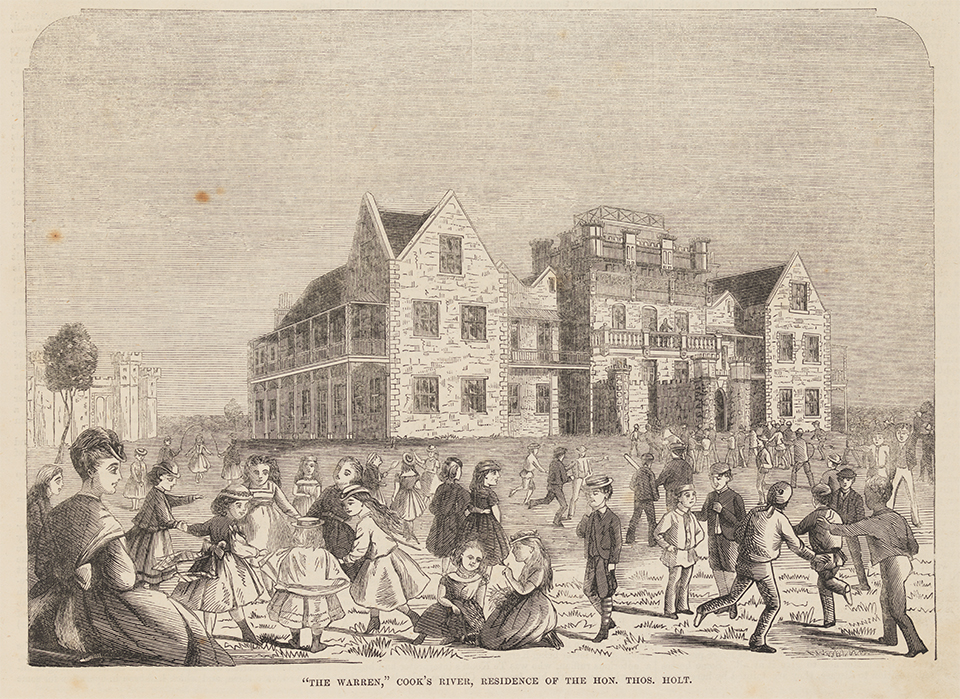
The Warren, March 1870

In 1861, Marrickville became a municipality. By the end of the decade, the suburb had a reputation of being rural and attractive. Dairies supplied the area and Sydney more broadly. In 1857 or 1864, pastoralist and politician Thomas Holt built a Victorian Gothic mansion known as 'The Warren'. The building was outfitted with many amenities, including an art gallery and Victorian Turkish baths. It was later occupied by Carmelite nuns and for artillery training. Despite being demolished in 1919, the area it occupied is still known by some residents as The Warren. In 1878, the first municipal building was constructed, a town hall. Other structures built around this time included a school in 1864, a post-office in 1865, and a new train station in 1895.

Around the time of the creation of the Aboriginal Protection Board in 1883, there are few records of Aboriginal people in the broader Cooks River area. Most Aboriginal people in the area were relocated by authorities to the suburb of La Perouse, although some remained and continued to fish the river.

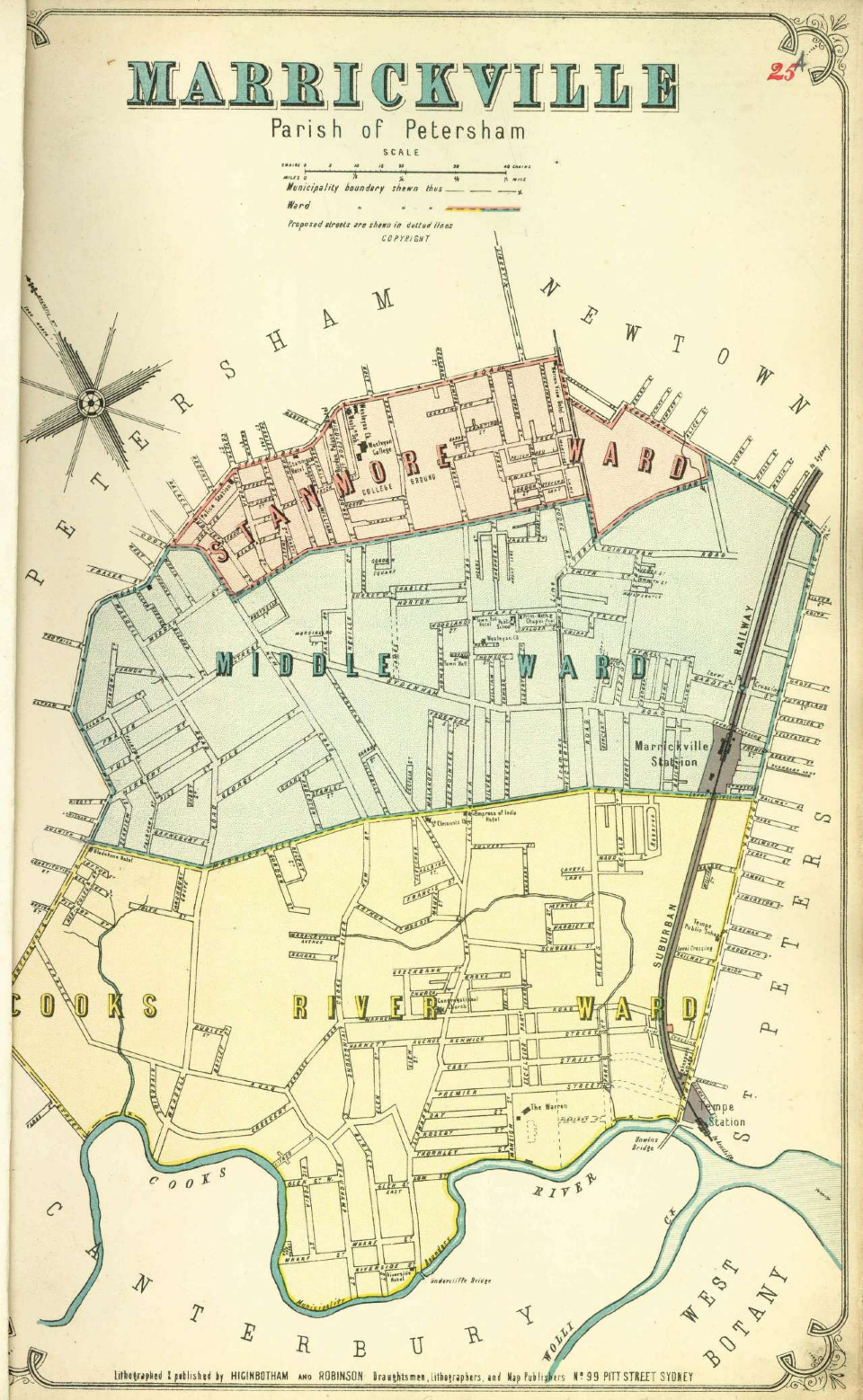
Marrickville, 1886-1888

During the late 1880s, market gardens were converted into brick pits, and the industry became mechanised. Large houses were demolished to make way for brick pits, land was subdivided to create cheap accommodation for their workers and the Gumbramorra swamp was drained. The area now contained the largest brickmaking firms in Sydney, and the population had become working class. As of 1892, Marrickville had a population of 12,500. Although the pits ultimately emptied of clay, other industries such as wool, steel and automotive established themselves in Marrickville in the 1890s, and the suburb grew faster than its neighbours.

During the 1920s, Marrickville contained a large Irish-Catholic population, and was a Labor Party stronghold. Included among these was Joseph Cahill, who later served as the Premier of New South Wales. Industry was particularly strong in the interwar period, when almost all men and women were employed. The local industry was a source of pride, and exhibitions were put on displaying the products. Production was assorted, including guitars, radios, chocolate and boots; particularly prominent was wool. Dances during this period were very popular, and an orchestra was created, the first made by a suburban council.

=== After WWII ===
After World War II, immigrants, particularly from Greece, settled in the suburb, drawn by job opportunities and cheap housing. Greek immigrants opened many shops along Marrickville Road despite prejudice against Southern Europeans. In this period, Aboriginal people migrated to Sydney from the country and beyond, settling in particular in Marrickville with its cheap accommodation and proximity to jobs. They have since stayed close to the river, holding themselves as its custodians. In 1948, Marrickville merged with the neighbouring municipalities of St Peters and Petersham, forming the Marrickville Municipal Council.

Beginning in the 1970s, factories in Marrickville closed, with some moving away from the city to cheaper and larger land. The area became increasingly residential, although some industry was retained. The following decade, Chinese and Vietnamese immigrants came into Marrickville, starting shops and restaurants along Illawarra Road. In the 1990s, the area gained a reputation for crime after a series of stabbings at the local high school and heroin-related crimes.

During the 2000s, Marrickville had begun to gentrify. Property prices increased, and crime went down. Young professionals entered the area and accordingly the percentage of people born overseas decreased. Trendy restaurants and shops, such as farmers markets and coffee shops opened up; this development was compared in the media to that of the nearby suburb Paddington.

By 2017, Marrickville was among the most prominent suburbs in the Sydney hipster subculture, with a young population and many bars and vegetarian and vegan establishments. During the early 2020s, it was repeatedly voted among the "coolest neighbourhoods in the world" by Time Out magazine.

== Heritage listings ==
Marrickville has a number of heritage-listed sites, including:

- Marrickville railway station
- Carrington Road: Sewage Pumping Station 271
- Garden Street: Sydenham Pit and Drainage Pumping Station 1
- 96–106 Illawarra Road: Marrickville Town Hall
- 274A Marrickville Road: Marrickville Post Office
- 24, 26 Premier Street: Premier Street Sewer Vent and Cottages
- Thornley Street: Cooks River Sewage Aqueduct
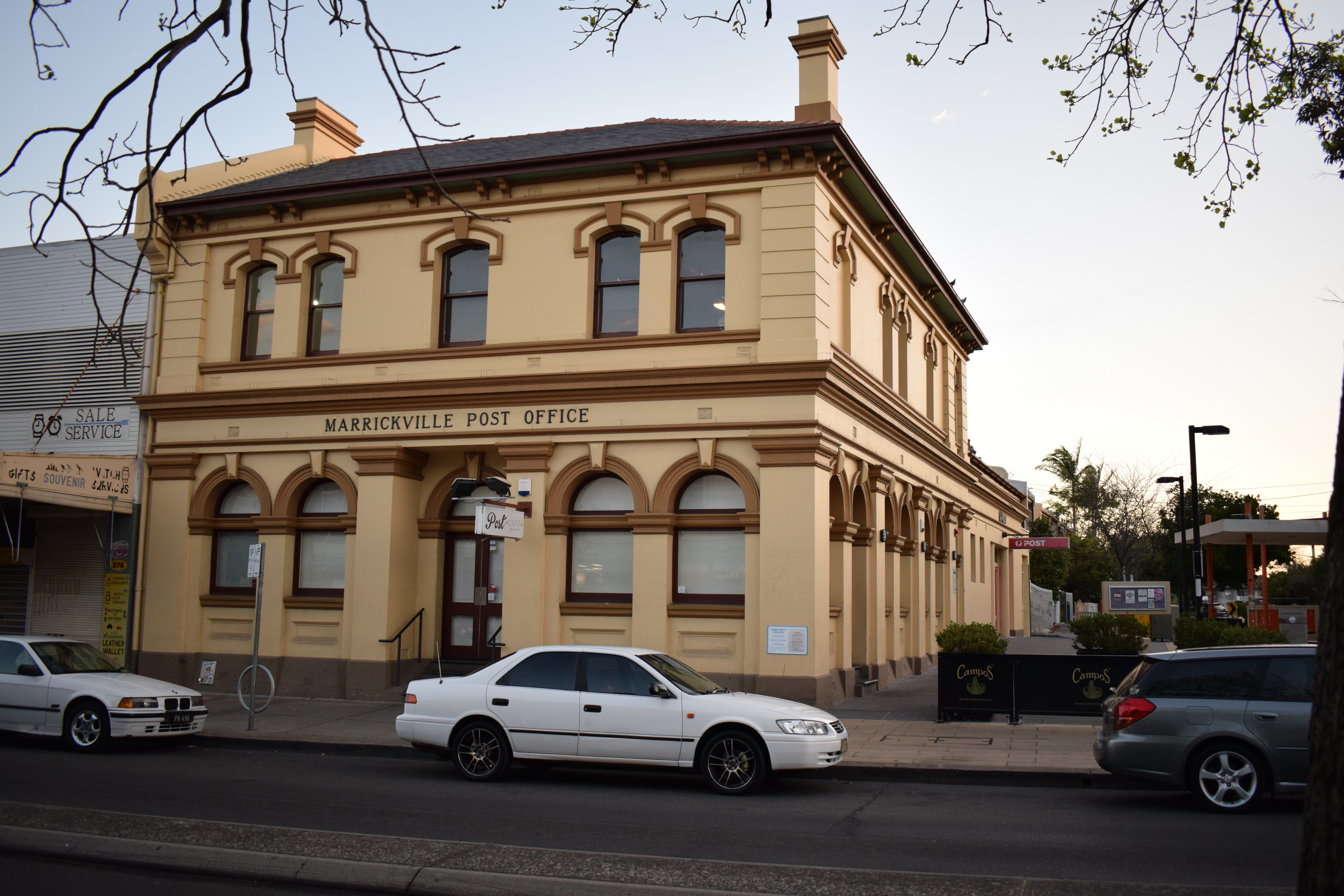
Marrickville Post Office

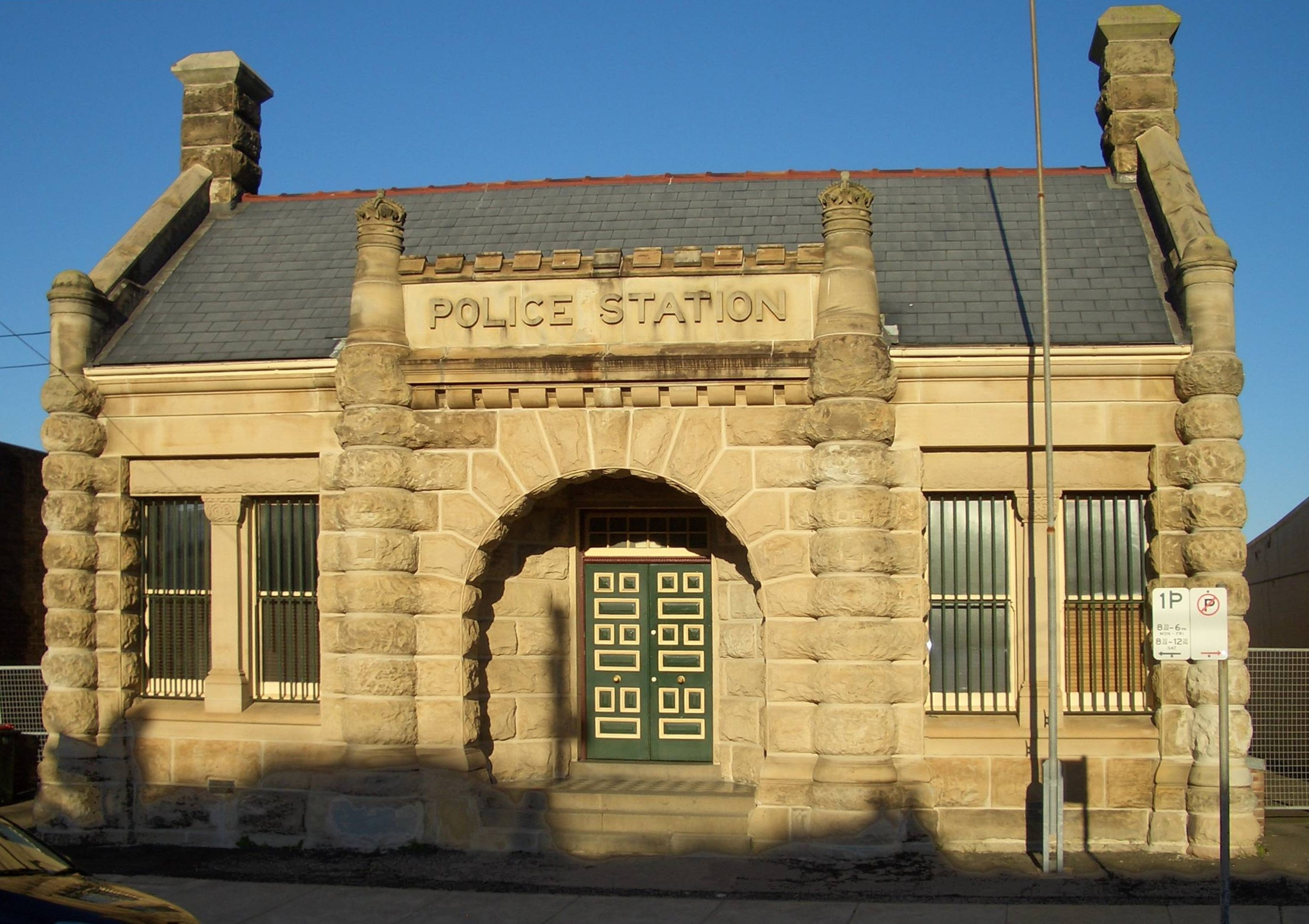
Old Police Station, Gladstone Street

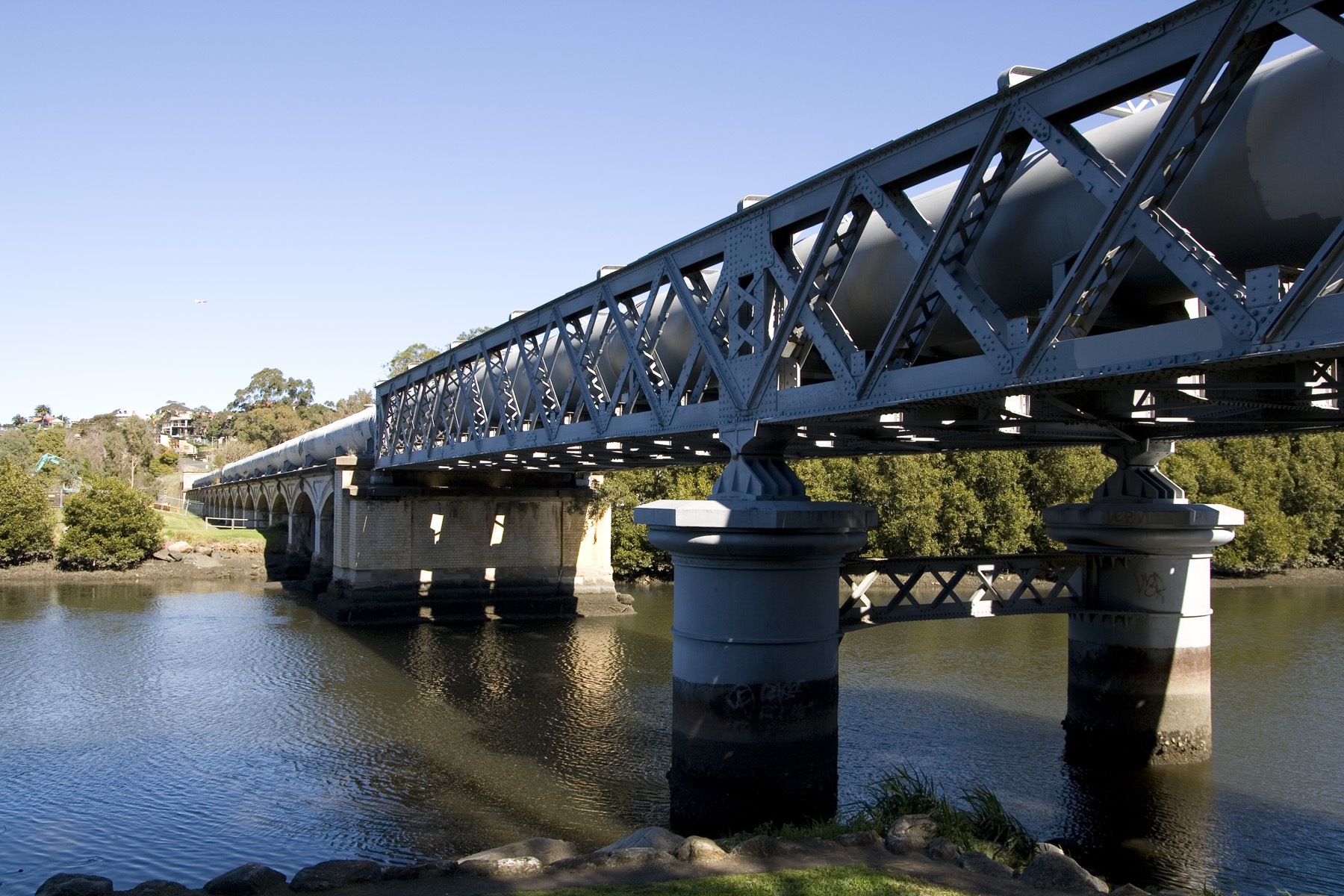
Cooks River Sewage Aqueduct

== Demographics ==
At the 2021 census, the population of Marrickville was 26,570 people. Around 49% of the population were male and 51% were female, whilst the median age was 37 years, below the national median of 38.

48.1% of the population of Marrickville were born overseas, higher than the 39.4% of New South Wales residents and 36.7% of Australians as a whole. The top places of birth outside of Australia were Vietnam (5.6%), Greece (3.9%) and England (3.4%), the first two far above the national average of 1% for Vietnam and 0.4% for Greece. A similar number of Marrickville residents reported their ancestry as English as those who reported being of Australian ancestry (25.4% and 22.5%), below the national averages, whilst Irish (11.9%), Greek (8.8%), and Scottish (8.6%) were the next highest responses; noting that respondents could select up to two ethnicities. Residents identifying as being of Greek ancestry were far above the national average. 417 residents identified as being Aboriginal and/or Torres Strait Islander.

Other statistics from the 2021 census:

- 62.3% of people only spoke English at home. Other languages spoken at home included Greek 7.0%, Vietnamese 6.9%, Arabic 2.4%, Portuguese 1.8% and Cantonese 1.8%.
- Finances: The median household weekly income was $2,170 compared to the national median of $1,746. This difference is also reflected in real estate, with the median mortgage payment being $2,600 per month, compared to the national median of $1,863.
- Transport: On the day of the census, 7.5% of employed people used public transport (train, bus, ferry, tram/light rail) as at least one of their methods of travel to work and 24.3% used car (either as driver or as passenger).
- Housing: 47.2% of occupied residences were flats, units or apartments, 32.0% were separate houses, 18.5% were semi-detached (row or terrace houses, townhouses etc.), and 2.2% were other dwellings. The average household size was 2.3 people.
- Religion: The most common response for religion was No Religion (48.9%); the next most common response was Catholic at 17.7%; the third most common response was Eastern Orthodox at 8.5%.

== Culture ==
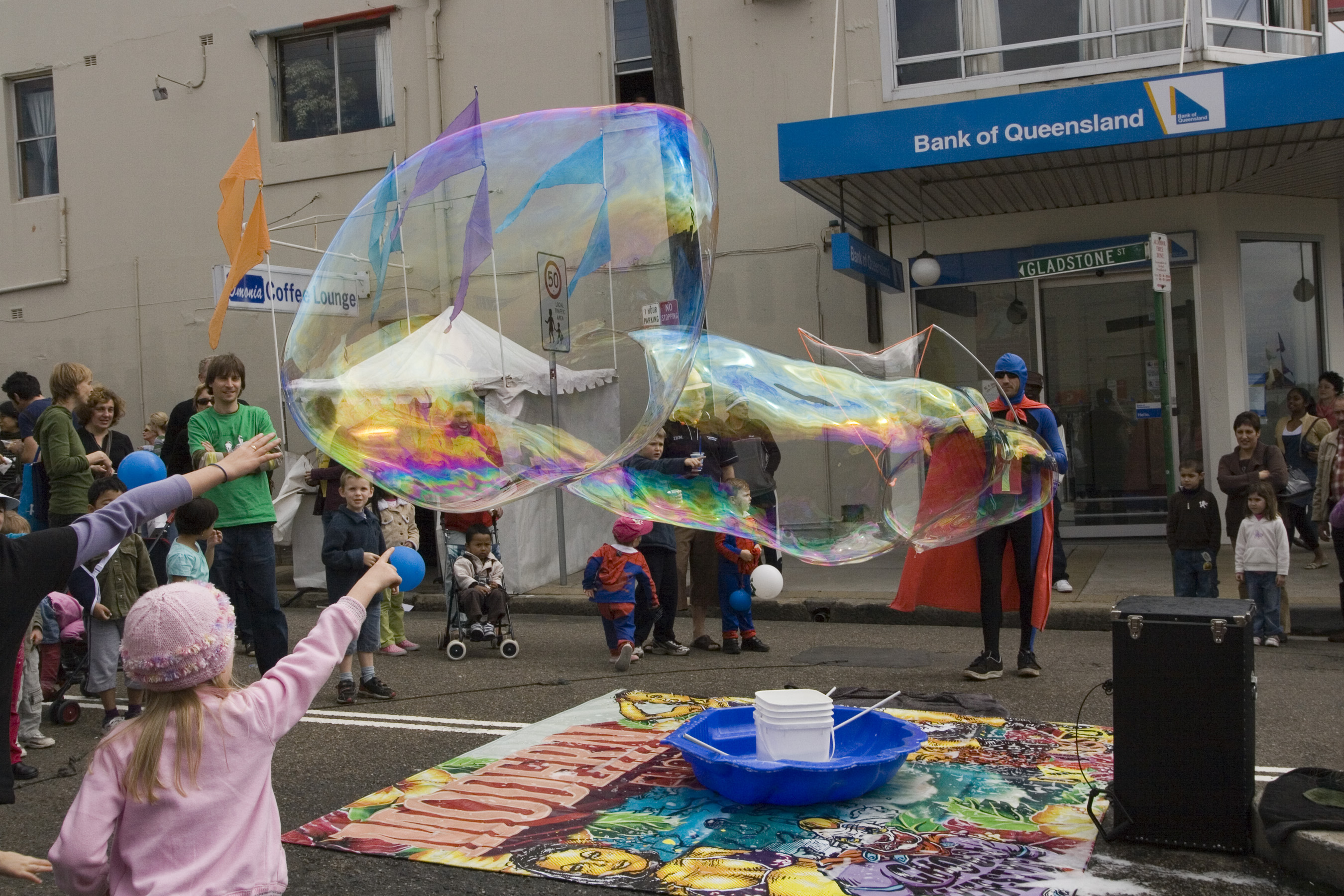
Marrickville festival, 2007

The Marrickville Festival takes place each September. It consists of daytime displays of live music and dance from various cultural traditions. Several live music venues exist in the suburb, including the Marrickville Bowling Club and the Factory Theatre. As part of a broader trend of Sydney's inner west having a greater artistic presence, several workspaces for artists also exist, although as of 2022 increased land prices made it increasingly difficult for artists to afford work and exhibition spaces. Public artworks include several metal sculptures perched on buildings; these were installed before the 2000 Summer Olympics.

Marrickville contains several restaurants and artisan grocers. Before the suburb was gentrified, Vietnamese bakeries and restaurants, and Greek delis existed throughout; although these remain, they are less dominant. Within such Greek food establishments, pork rolls are particularly popular. Marrickville hosts organic markets every weekend.

Liquor establishments, including bars and gin distilleries are prominent in the suburb. Since 2013, a significant number of breweries have been established in the light industrial spaces that exist throughout Marrickville. A 2022 article in The Sydney Morning Herald described it as the "craft beer capital of Australia", and attributed the volume to Marrickville being the closest suburb to the CBD with industrial land, and because residents were supportive of the businesses.

== Commercial areas ==
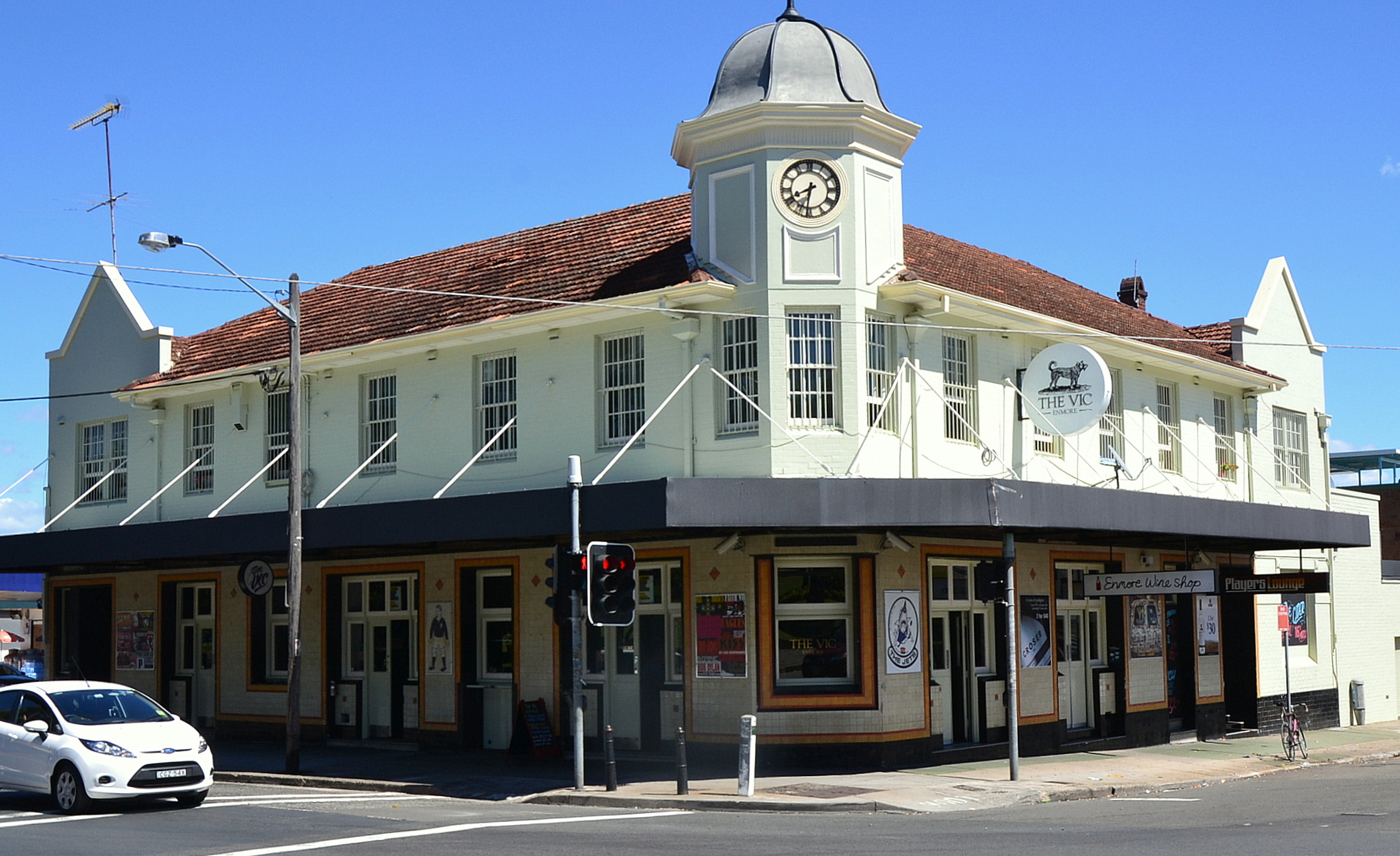
The Vic Hotel, Addison Road

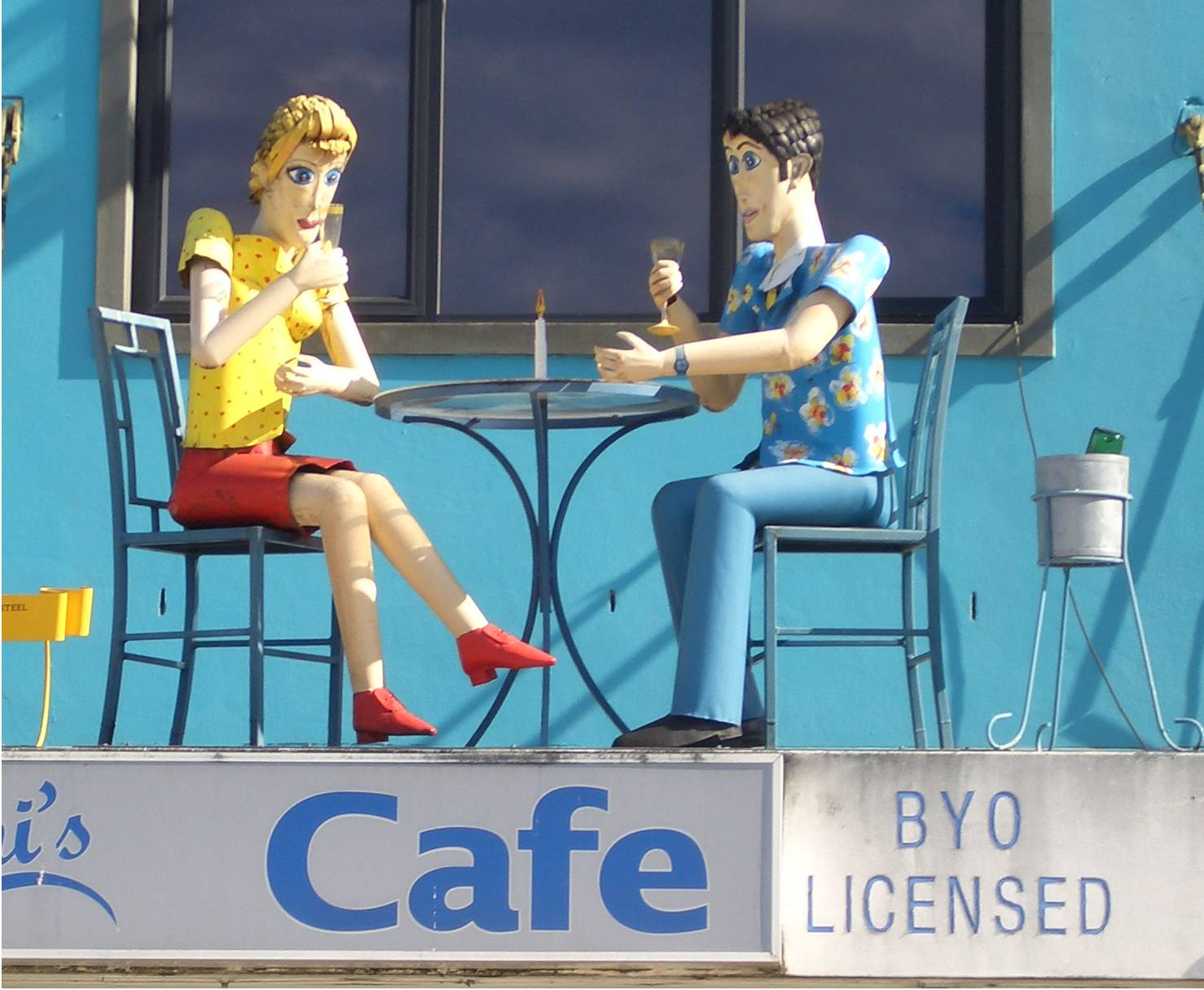
Artwork on top of Celini's Cafe

The main shopping strip runs along Marrickville Road, west from Sydenham to the town hall. Typical businesses include cafés, grocery and clothing stores. Marrickville Road is well known for the artworks, by Ces Camilleri of Creative Artistic Steel, that adorn the awnings of some of its businesses. The shopping strip also extends south along Illawarra Road, past the railway station, to "The Warren" locality.

Addison Road, also referred to a "Addi Road", is home to over 20 community organisations, along with art studios, galleries, theatres, a radio station, open green space, gardens and 169 trees. It is the location of the Addison Road Community Organisation, which runs the a Living Museum program showcasing the history and heritage of the area. The Addison Rd Centre for the Arts, Culture, Community and Environment, located at number 142, is located on the site of a former army depot, which opened after being converted in 1976. It includes many artists' studios. The community radio station Radio Skid Row is located Hut 23 in the community centre. and broadcasts to the Inner West suburbs of Sydney. Every Sunday the Addison Community Centre hosts a market where fresh fruit and vegetables, coffee and other edible products and second-hand goods are sold.

Marrickville Metro is a shopping centre located near the border with Enmore and contains supermarkets, retail, discount stores, speciality shops, food courts, restaurants. It was built on the site of the Vicars Woollen Mill in 1987. Food markets are also held bi-monthly at Marrickville Metro on Smidmore Street.

During the 2010s, the amount of industrial spaces in Marrickville decreased as they were redeveloped and as of 2024 Marrickville contained 67 ha (0.67 km^{2}) of land zoned for industry. Much of this is in South Marrickville, which hosts car repair workshops, taxi businesses and factories. Creative industries include a creative reuse centre on Addison Road; established in 1974 by a group of school teachers, it is today the largest of its kind in Australia.

== Transport ==
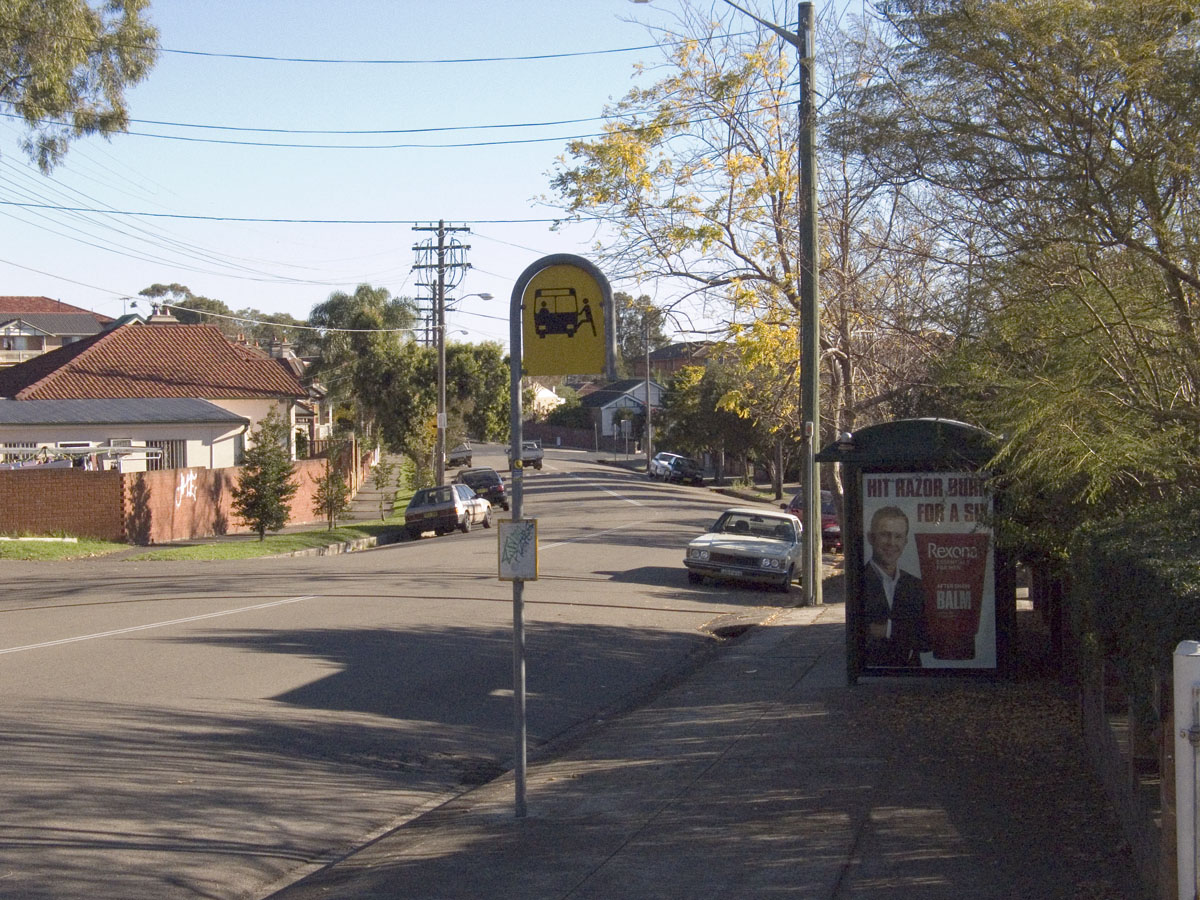
Bus stop on Beauchamp St

Marrickville railway station is on the Bankstown Line of the Sydney Trains network. The adjacent station of Dulwich Hill serves the south-western part of the suburb. The station was closed on 30 September 2024 to allow for the line to be converted to Sydney Metro standards; the Metro trains will subsequently serve the rebranded Metro North West & Bankstown Line.

The terminus of the Inner West Light Rail is located adjacent to Dulwich Hill railway station. Access to the city is quicker by train, but the light rail may be used for some cross-regional journeys. The service also interchanges with Lewisham railway station on the Inner West & Leppington Line.

Public buses serve all main roads, including Marrickville Road, Enmore Road, Illawarra Road, Victoria Road, Wardell Road and Livingstone Road. These include the 418 bus from Burwood to Bondi Junction via Ashfield, Dulwich Hill, Sydenham and Eastlakes, the 426 bus from Dulwich Hill to Circular Quay via Newtown and the CBD, the 423 bus from Kingsgrove to Martin Place via Earlwood, Newtown and the CBD, and the 412 bus which runs from Campsie to Kings Wharf via Kingsgrove, Earlwood, Petersham, Camperdown, Parramatta Road and the CBD.

The suburb is 5 kilometres north-west from Sydney Airport and lies under a flight path.

== Education ==
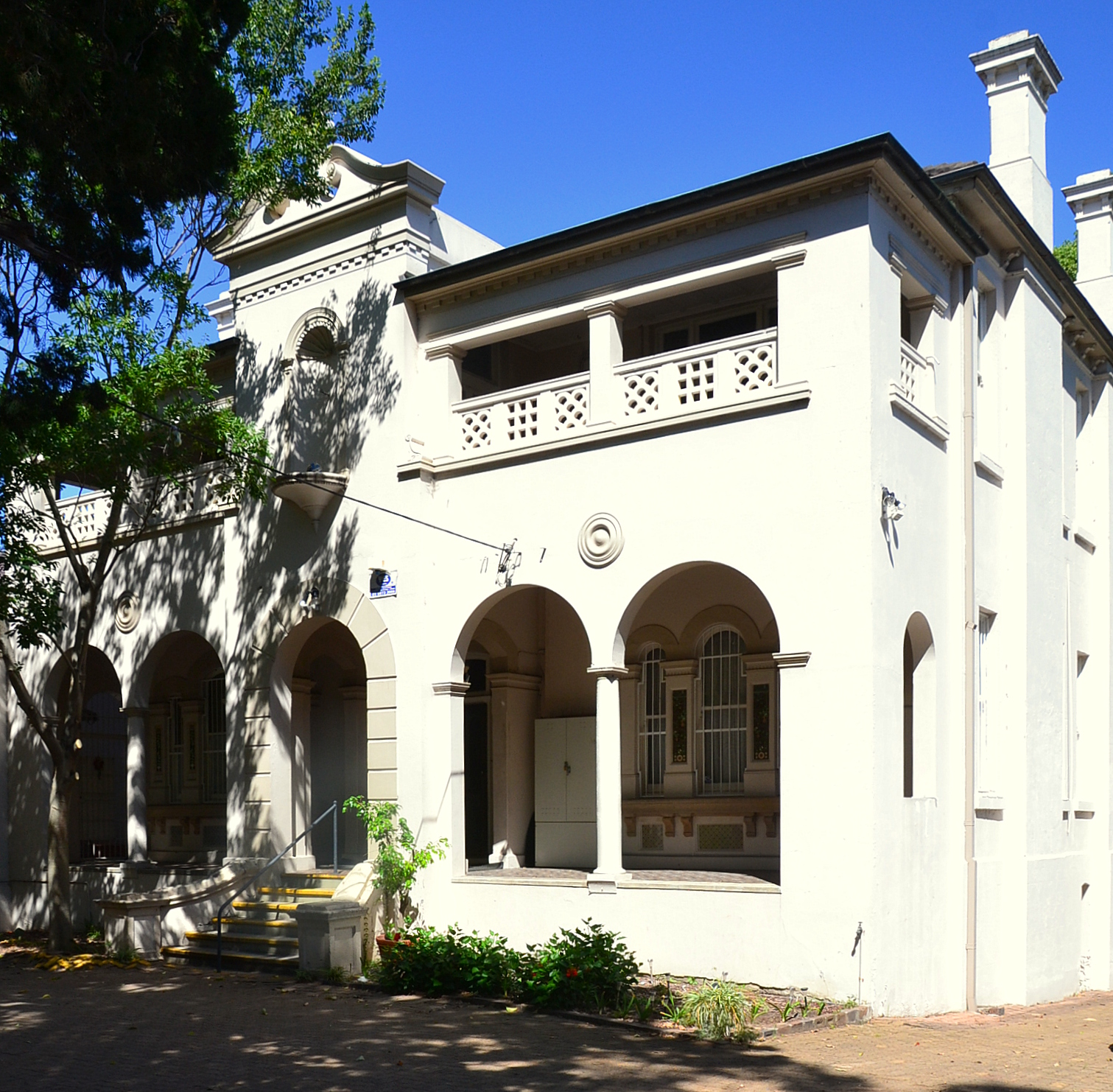
St Pius's Catholic School, Edgeware Road

Marrickville has four public primary schools: Marrickville Public School, Marrickville West Primary School, Ferncourt Public School and Wilkins Public School, as well as two private primary schools: St. Pius Catholic School, and St. Brigids Catholic School. There are two secondary schools, one public, Marrickville High School, and one private, Casimir Catholic College.

== Churches ==
Religious buildings in Marrickville include:

- St Clements Anglican Church is located diagonally across the intersection of Marrickville Road and Petersham Road. It now houses Marrickville Rd Church, a multi cultural, multi ethnic church plant. It is a heritage-listed building.
- St Brigid's Catholic Church: On the corner of Marrickville and Livingstone roads. It is the second largest church in Sydney after St Mary's Cathedral and is the home of Gift of Bread, a food rescue organisation.
- St Maroun's Catholic College: On Wardell Road.
- Silver Street Mission: a Baptist congregation on the corner of Silver and Calvert streets.
- St Nicholas Greek Orthodox Church: On Livingstone Road.
- Orthodox Monastery of the Archangel Michael: A monastery of the Russian Orthodox Church.
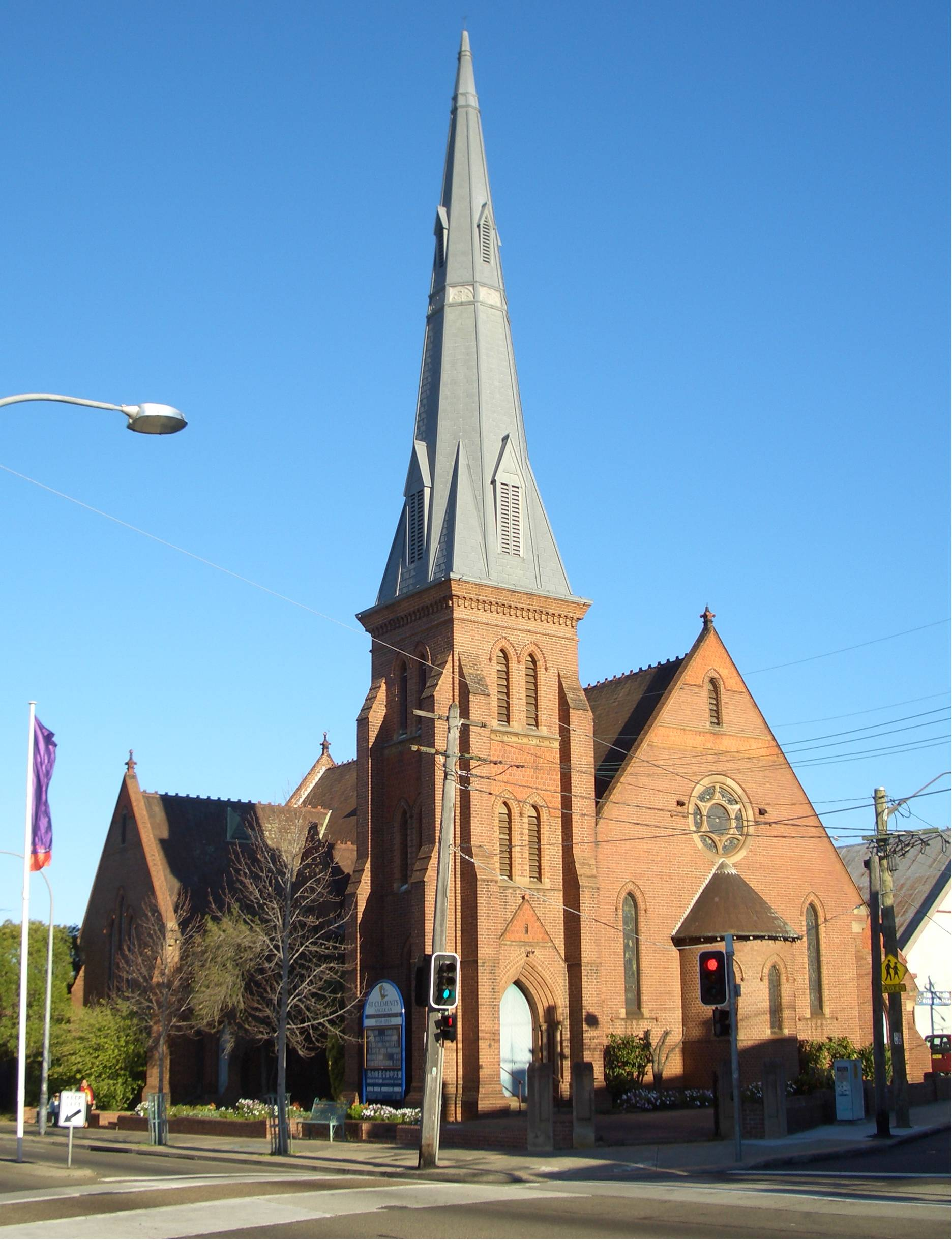
Marrickville Road Church

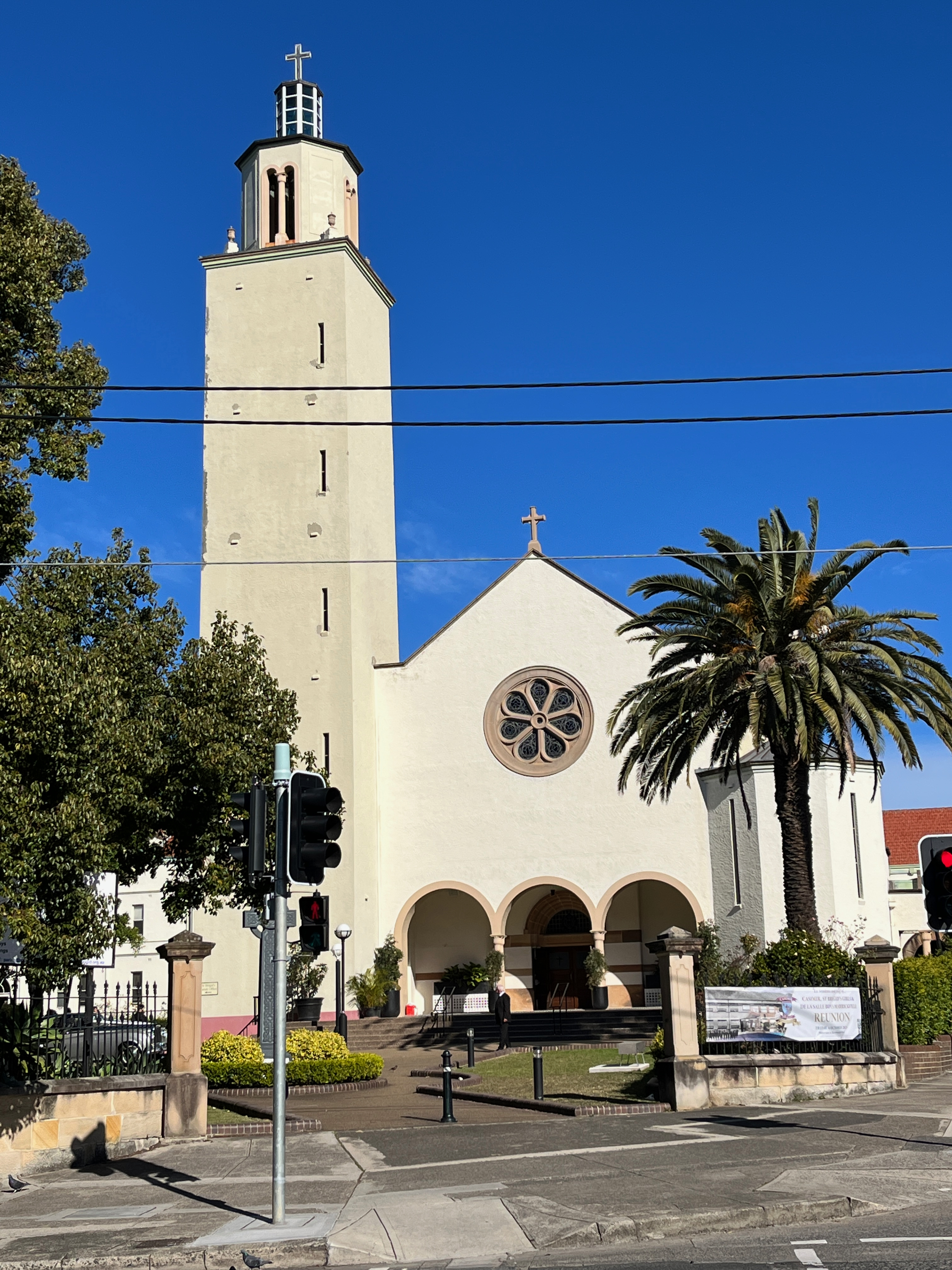
St Brigid's Catholic Church

== Architecture ==
Homes of various architectural styles exist throughout Marrickville: bungalows in the Federation style stand close to older, terrace houses. Particularly on sites previously occupied by factories, units have been established, as have townhouses.

Marrickville Town Hall is located on the corner of Marrickville Road and Petersham Road. Outside Marrickville Town Hall is a World War I war memorial, featuring a bronze cast Winged Victory figure over 4 m (13 ft) tall.

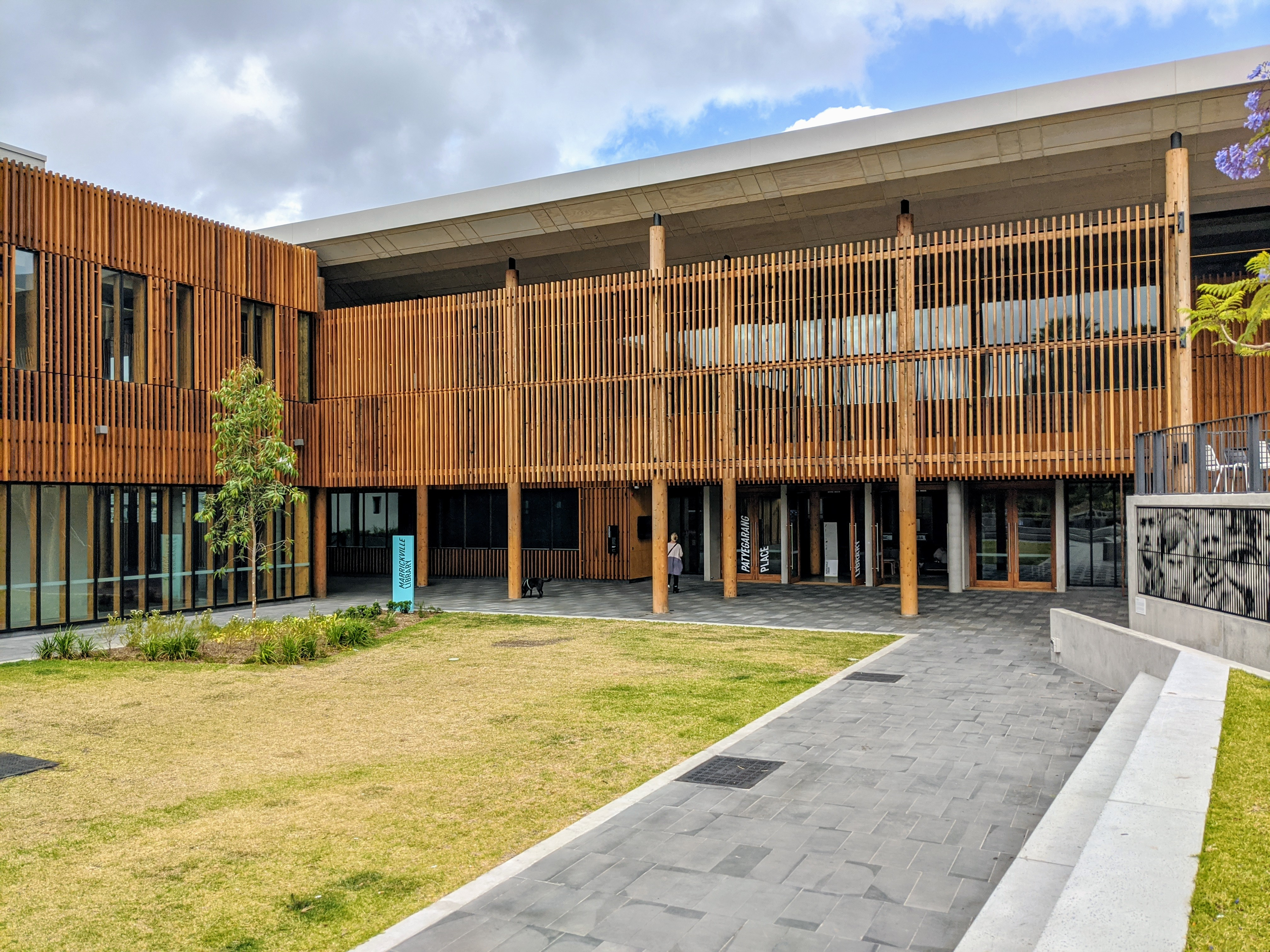
Marrickville Library

In 1995, the Marrickville council purchased the site of the defunct Marrickville Hospital with the intention of building a new Marickville Library, replacing the then-library on the corner of Marrickville and Petershem roads. After many delays, planning began in earnest in 2011 and the new library opened in August 2019. It has a collection of 85,000 books, a 30% increase from the old library. It resides in several newly built structures and the restored Marrickville Hospital. The grounds were renamed Patyegarang Place for the first Indigenous person to teach settlers the language local to the area, the Dharug language.

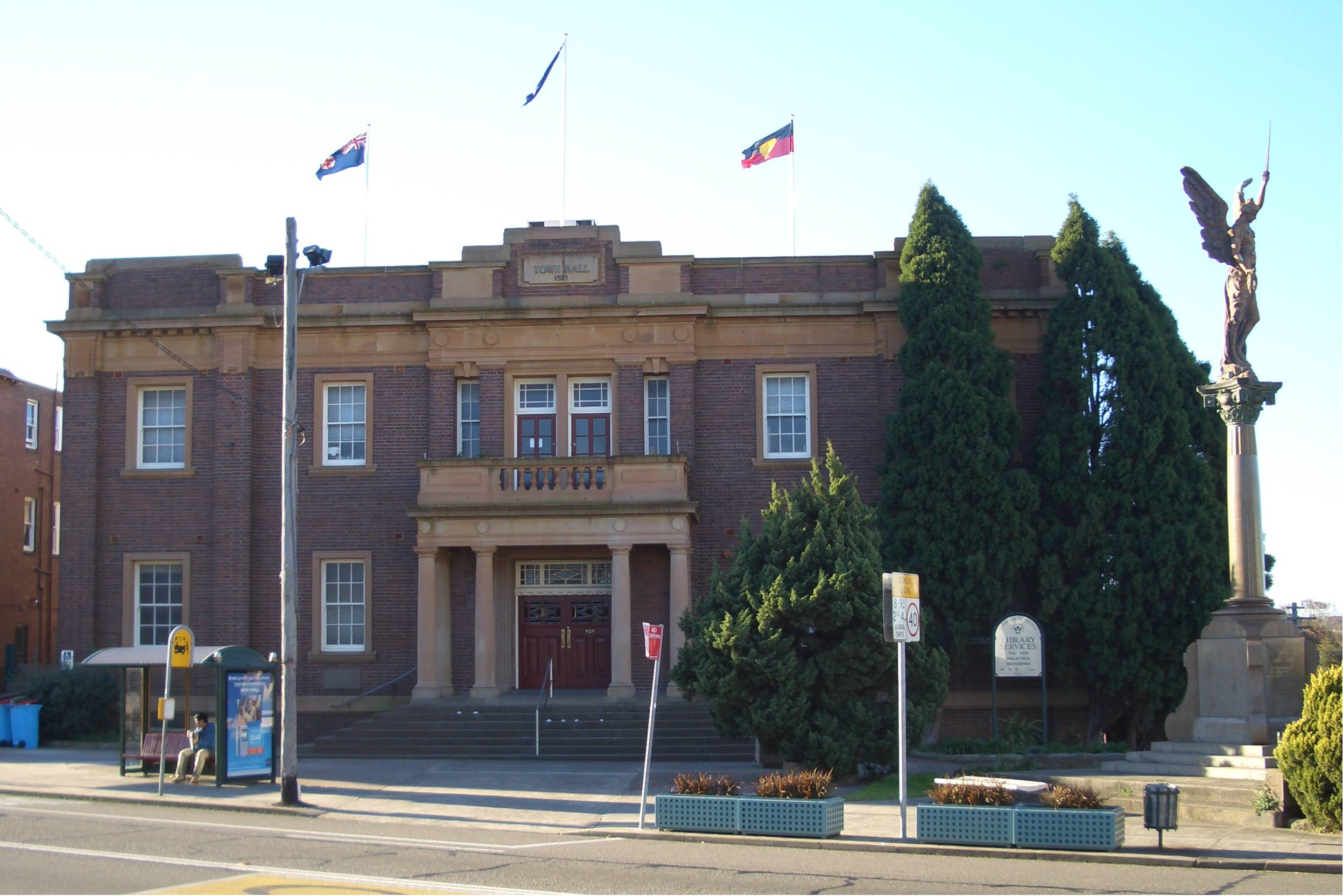
Marrickville Town Hall

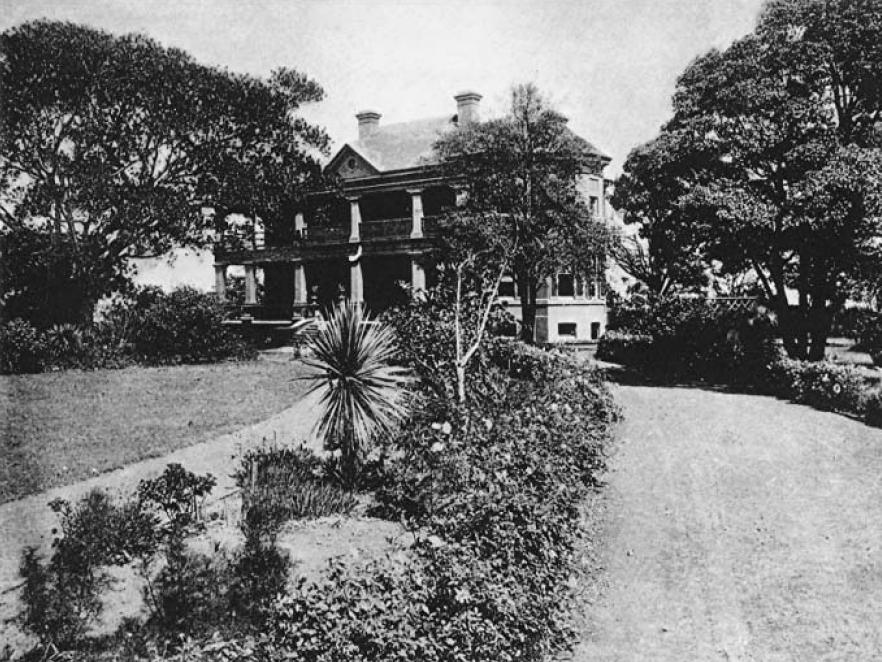
Stead House

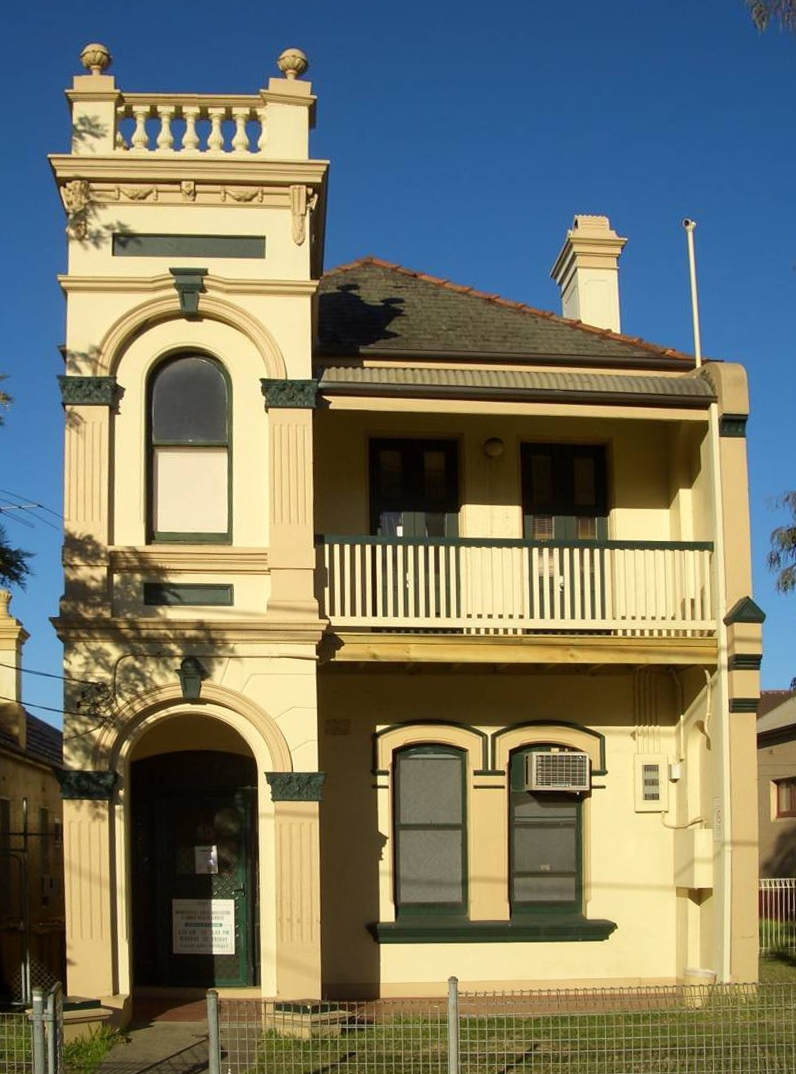
Victorian Italianate home, Livingstone Road

== Sport and recreation ==
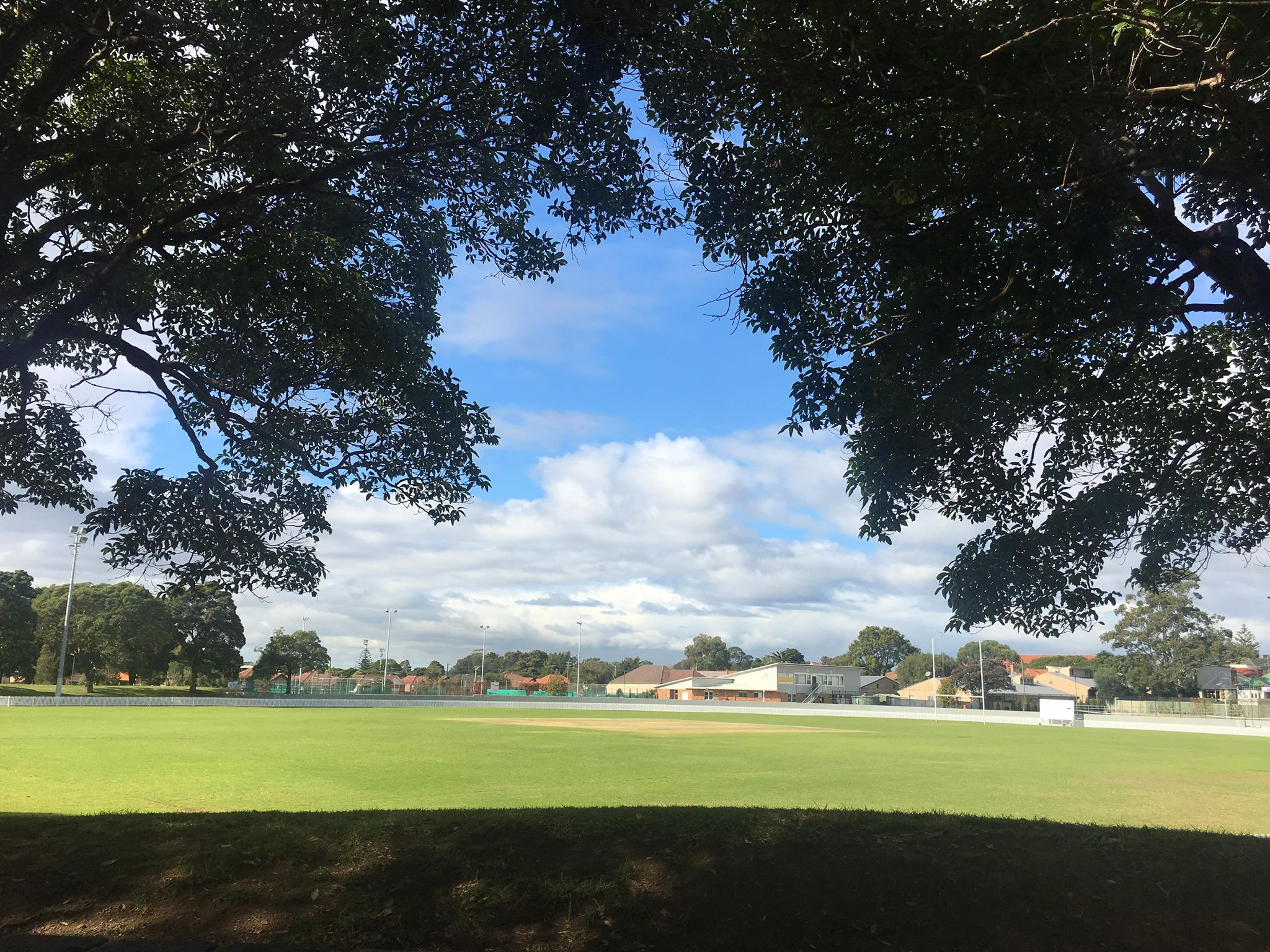
Marrickville Oval

Marrickville is home to a number of sporting venues and teams. Henson Park is home of the Newtown Jets rugby league team, formerly one of the elite Sydney teams, but currently playing in the second tier New South Wales Cup and acting as a feeder club for the Cronulla-Sutherland Sharks. Marrickville Oval, on Livingstone Road, is used by lower grade teams from the Randwick Petersham Cricket Club, which plays in the Sydney Grade Cricket competition and the Newtown Jnr Jets. It is also home to Marrickville A reserve who are consistently made up of mostly Polynesian players (mostly family)

Fraser Park, next to the railway line between Marrickville and Sydenham stations is home to the Fraser Park FC soccer club which plays in the NSW Men's Premier League 2, the second tier of soccer in NSW.

Marrickville Golf Course runs along the banks of the Cooks River.

The Annette Kellerman aquatic centre, located near the border with Enmore, was opened on 26 January 2011. It features a 50-metre (160-foot), eight-lane Swimming Pool catering to lap swimmers, squads and swimming carnivals; a dedicated programs pool / hydrotherapy pool set up for learn-to-swim lessons, aquaerobics classes and rehabilitation activities; and a leisure Pool. It replaced an historic outdoor 33-yard pool.

Most parks in Marrickville sit on the former-sites of brick pits. After the industry closed, the empty pits filled with rainwater. During the summers, young people would swim in them and often drowned. In response, in the 1920s and 30s the council filled them, creating several parks including Henson Park. Other parks in Marrickville include Steel Park, Mackey Park, Marrickville Oval, McNeilly Park and Jarvie Park.

== Notable people ==
Notable people associated with Marrickville include:

- Maybanke Susannah Anderson, a reformer involved in women's suffrage and federation lived at Maybanke in Marrickville where she opened a girls school
- Kevin Berry, Australian Olympic swimmer, gold medalist in 1964
- Don Burrows, Australian jazz musician
- Roy Farnsworth, Australian rugby league player
- John Farrow, Australian film director, producer, and screenwriter
- Jeff Fenech, Australian boxer and a three time world champion (nickname: The Marrickville Mauler)
- Joe Gartner, Australian rugby league player
- Virginia Gay, actress on the TV shows; All Saints and Winners and Losers
- Stanley Gibbs, shipping clerk and George Cross recipient
- Benjamin Gower Hardy, World War 2 soldier and George Cross recipient
- Akira Isogawa, fashion designer; design studio located in Marrickville
- Annette Kellerman, professional swimmer, vaudeville and film star and writer
- Andy Kent, bass and vocals for You Am I (Australian Band); lives in the Marrickville LGA
- Damien Leith, winner of the fourth season of Australian Idol
- Jim McCue, Australian rugby league player
- Lisa McCune, a Gold-Logie winning actress known for her role in Blue Heelers and host of Forensic Investigators
- Martin Mulligan, Australian tennis player, 1962 Wimbledon tournament finalist
- Trisha Noble, Australian singer and actress
- Costa Prasoulas, actor and martial artist, silver medalist at the 2009 World Games
- Ron Saggers, Test cricketer
- Bob Simpson, Australian cricket captain, later coach
- David Wenham, Australian actor; known for his roles in the films The Lord of the Rings Trilogy, Van Helsing, 300 and Public Enemies
- Peter Wherrett, journalist and racing driver
- Mark Williams, singer and songwriter; lives locally. In 2005 he became the vocalist for the reformed New Zealand/Australian band, Dragon
- Harry Wolstenholme, lawyer and keen amateur ornithologist lived in Marrickville as a child
- George Wootten, Australian major general, commander of the 9th Division
- Anthony Albanese, 31st and current Australian Prime Minister and MP representing the Division of Grayndler
- Nat's What I Reckon, influencer and celebrity cook
