= Sydenham Pit and Drainage Pumping Station 1 =

Sydenham Pit & Drainage Pumping Station 1
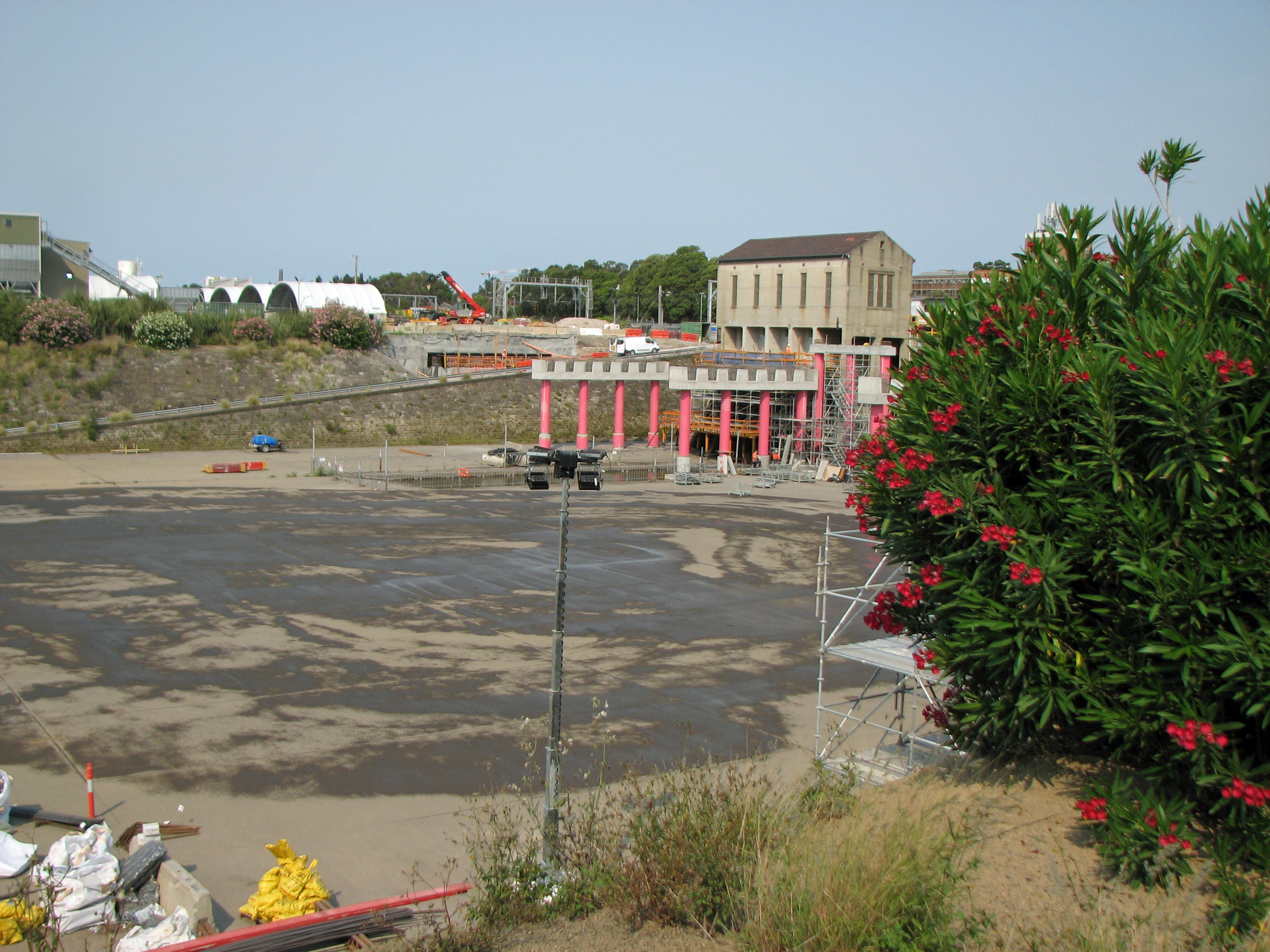
- Sydenham Pit and Drainage Pumping Station, Garden Street, Marrickville, NSW

- Location within Sydney Location within Australia
- 33.9118°S 151.1687°E
- Location: Garden Street, Marrickville, Inner West Council, Sydney, New South Wales, Australia

History
- Built: 1935–1941

Site notes
- Architect: New South Wales Public Works Department
- Owner: Sydney Water

New South Wales Heritage Register
- Official name: Sydenham Pit & Drainage Pumping Station 1; Sydenham Stormwater Basin; Drainage Pumping Station (DPS1)
- Type: state heritage (built)
- Designated: 15 November 2002
- Reference no.: 1644
- Type: Other - Utilities - Water
- Category: Utilities - Water
- Builders: New South Wales Public Works Department

Sydenham Pit & Drainage Pumping Station 1 is a heritage-listed pumping station and stormwater drain in Garden Street, Marrickville, Inner West Council, Sydney, New South Wales, Australia. The facility is located adjacent to the railway line running between Sydenham railway station and St Peters railway station. It was designed by the NSW Public Works Department, which built the project from 1935 to 1941. It is also known as Sydenham Stormwater Basin and Drainage Pumping Station (DPS1). The property is owned by Sydney Water. It was added to the New South Wales State Heritage Register on 15 November 2002.

== History ==
With the completion of the Illawarra railway beyond Sydenham in the 1880s, the urburbanisation of the Marrickville Valley increased rapidly. It was soon found that the valley had significant drainage problems, which were partly solved by the construction of a stormwater pumping station in Carrington Road, Marrickville in 1897 (now Sewage Pumping Station 271) and three main stormwater channels, comprising the Eastern, Western and Central Channels. In the 1930s the government decided to improve the drainage system, which included an allocation of unemployment relief funds for drainage works in Marrickville Municipality. The scheme included the drainage of the northern section of the low level area north of Marrickville Road, comprising the excavation of a storage pit, the erection of a pumping station with a rising main discharging into the Eastern Channel and the construction of a system of channels discharging into the pit. The pit and pumping station were constructed by the Public Works Department in the late 1930s and transferred to the Metropolitan Water Sewerage and Drainage Board in 1941.

Sections of the southern and western pit walls collapsed following heavy rains and were rebuilt in the 1950s. In 1968 a concrete floor and a silt pit were installed to the base of the pit.

From 2019 the area covering the stormwater drain was used to carry part of the infrastructure for the Sydney Metro City & Southwest with the construction of "a new aqueduct over the existing heritage-listed Sydenham Pit while retaining the existing heritage listed pump station."

== Description ==
Sydenham Storage Pit and Pumping Station consists of two distinct parts: the pit and pumping station (albeit they are integral in operation). The pit consists of a nine metre deep basin with the sides formed into batters. The batters are faced with sandstone blocks laid horizontally in courses of about 300mm. The width of the blocks range from square to over one metre in length. The blocks are dressed on four sides with the face sparrow picked. Along the top of the stone facing wall, earth batters and an open concrete drain were formed. An access ramp to the base of the pit is located along the northern wall with entry from Railway Parade. The stone walls are penetrated by channel outlets in the southeast corner and in the centre of the western edge. The boundary of the site is planted with Oleanders. The pumping station is constructed of reinforced concrete and consists of a series of fins that rise 12 metres from the base of the pit to support the pump house that has its floor level about 1.8 metres above Railway Parade. Five concrete fins interspaced with four cylindrical concrete water shafts are incorporated, with the southern facade supported by three concrete piers joined by a horizontal cross-beam in the centre. The floor of the pumphouse overhangs the end concrete fin by about a metre and is supported by four concrete brackets. The pumphouse has the approximate internal dimensions of 7.2m wide x 17m long and 5.6m ceiling height. A switch room adjoins the eastern facade of the main pump room and has the approximate internal dimensions of 4.8m x .9m. The pumphouse has a tiled gable roof which continues down at the same pitch over the switch room. The southern and northern facades have three closely spaced vertical steel framed windows that form a square in the centre of the wall. The tops of the windows are overhung by a concrete lintel. Along the western facade of the pumphouse are five vertical windows centred on the void between the concrete fins. The building was designed in a version of the Inter-War Mediterranean domestic style.

The pumping station and drain are substantially intact.

== Heritage listing ==
The Sydenham Pit and Pumping Station is of historic, aesthetic and technical significance. Historically, it is the first such infrastructure built in the SWC system and is an intact and major component of the Marrickville low level stormwater drainage infrastructure that was built in response to increasing urban expansion since the 1870s in an area prone to flooding. Its large scale and labour-intensive construction method of excavating the pit reflects the abundance of labour during the Great Depression and the type of public works undertaken to provide relief work for the unemployed. Aesthetically, the use of pitched dry packed ashlar sandstone walls to line the sides of the pit provides a pleasantly textured and coloured finish to the pit. It is a major landmark and dramatic component of the industrial landscape of Sydenham particularly as viewed from the railway. The pumping station is a very good example of a utilitarian building displaying Inter-War Mediterranean style architectural details. Technically, the pumping plant contains good working examples of 1930s pumps, particularly three Metropolitan Vickers pumps, and its original electrical mains equipment has been preserved in situ during upgrading in c. 1992.

Sydenham Pit & Drainage Pumping Station 1 was listed on the New South Wales State Heritage Register on 15 November 2002 having satisfied the following criteria.

The place is important in demonstrating the course, or pattern, of cultural or natural history in New South Wales.

Sydenham Storage Pit and Pumping Station is of historical significance, being the first such infrastructure in the SWC system and an intact element and major component of the Marrickville low level stormwater infrastructure that was built in response to increasing urban expansion since the 1870s in an area prone to flooding. It is a major landmark and dramatic component of the industrial landscape of Sydenham particularly as viewed from the railway. Its construction, comprising large scale labour-intensive methods reflects the type of public works undertaken to provide depression relief work during the 1930s.

The place is important in demonstrating aesthetic characteristics and/or a high degree of creative or technical achievement in New South Wales.

The use of pitched ashlar sandstone walls to line the sides provides a pleasantly textured and coloured finish to the pit. The pumping station is a very good example of a utilitarian building designed in the Inter War Mediterranean Revival style, exploiting the use of architectural details associated with the style, including a tiled gable roof, tiled barge and pronounced lintels.

The place has potential to yield information that will contribute to an understanding of the cultural or natural history of New South Wales.

The pumping plant contains good working examples of 1930s pumps. The three Metropolitan Vickers pumps in particular are considered rare in the region. It maintains in situ evidence of the original electrical mains.

The place possesses uncommon, rare or endangered aspects of the cultural or natural history of New South Wales.

The Sydenham Pit and Drainage Pumping Station 1 is one of only two such installations in the SWC system and is one of the largest and most visible examples of a stormwater retention facility in Sydney.

The place is important in demonstrating the principal characteristics of a class of cultural or natural places/environments in New South Wales.

The pumping station is a representative example of Inter War Mediterranean Revival style public utility building.

== See also ==
- Sydney Metro City & Southwest
