= Marrickville Town Hall =

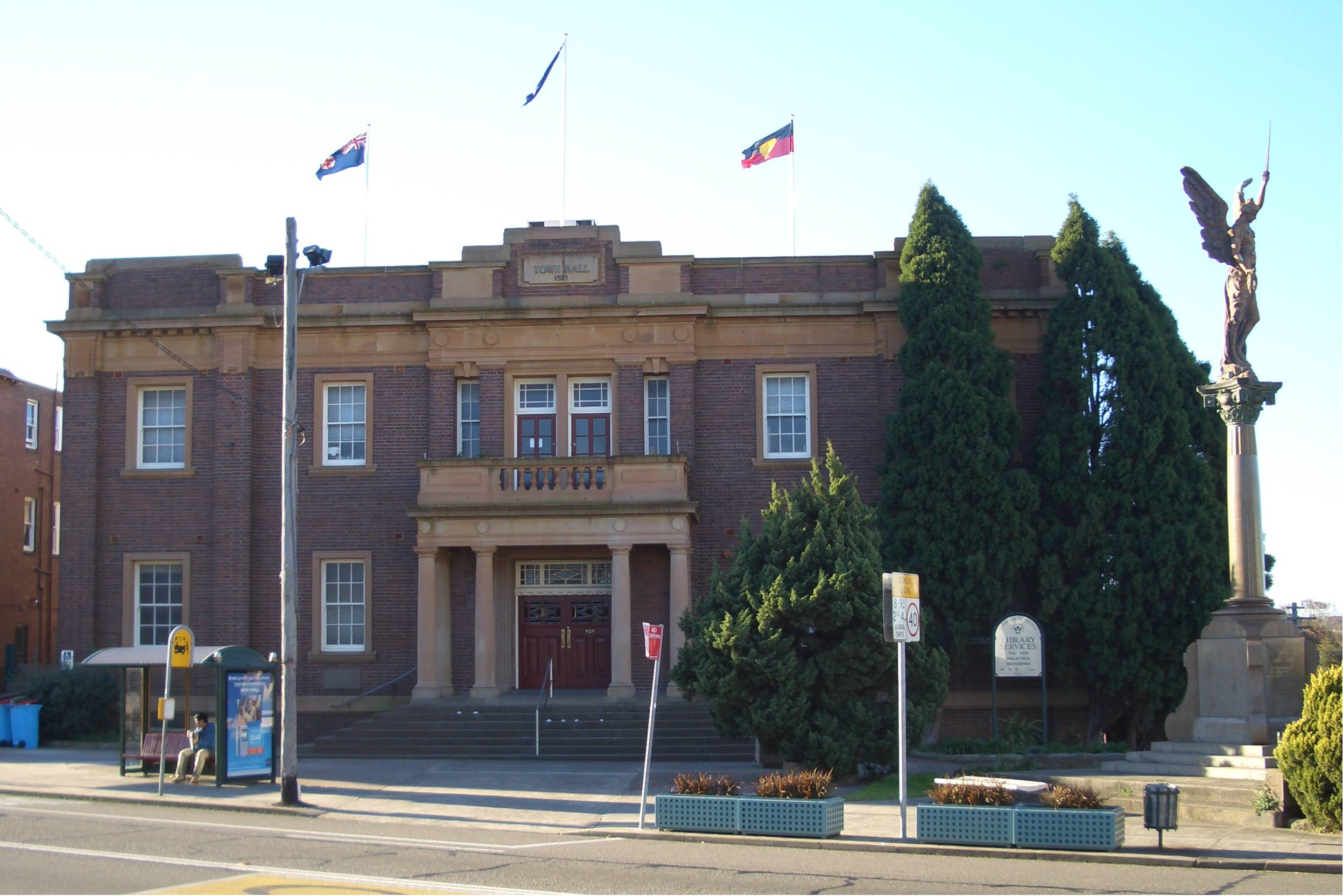
- The later Marrickville Road Town Hall in 2006, showing the original sculpture of Nike, which was replaced in 2015

- Location within inner Sydney

General information
- Type: Former town hall
- Location: 96-106 Illawarra Road, Marrickville, New South Wales, Australia
- Coordinates: 33°54′22″S 151°09′35″E
- Completed: 1879

Design and construction
- Architect: Edmund Blacket (attributed)
- Architecture firm: Blacket & Son

New South Wales Heritage Register
- Official name: Marrickville Town Hall (former)
- Designated: 2 April 1999
- Reference no.: 00573

There are two buildings, in the now abolished Marrickville Council area, which have held the title Marrickville Town Hall. The original town hall, is a heritage-listed building located at 96-106 Illawarra Road, Marrickville, an Inner West suburb of Sydney, in New South Wales, Australia. The building was added to the New South Wales State Heritage Register on 2 April 1999.

In 1922, the original building was replaced by the present Marrickville Town Hall, located at 303 Marrickville Road, Marrickville.

== History ==
=== Original building ===
The town hall at 96-106 Illawarra Road was opened in 1879. In 1883 a two-storey addition was added, together with a portico and steps with a lion couchant on either side.

The last meeting in the old building was held on 30 January 1922, on completion of the new Town Hall. The old building was then purchased by the Department of Education in May 1922. It formed part of Marrickville Public School, until 1985. In 1988 the school site was purchased by the Department of Housing and subdivided. The land adjoining the town hall was developed for pensioner housing.

==== Heritage listing ====
The Illawarra Road building is the oldest civil building in Marrickville and the fourth oldest town hall in Sydney. It is important for its association with the development and rise of local government in Sydney. It provides an important physical record of the early history of the municipality from its origins as a small village. It demonstrates the early pattern of Australian local politics. Completed 1879 the second storey extension of 1883 incorporated the existing building into a landmark of great aesthetic value. The Building was listed on the New South Wales State Heritage Register on 2 April 1999.

=== New building ===
The foundation stone for the building at 303 Marrickville Road, Marrickville was laid in 1921. The building was officially opened on 11 February 1922.

==== Nike sculptures ====
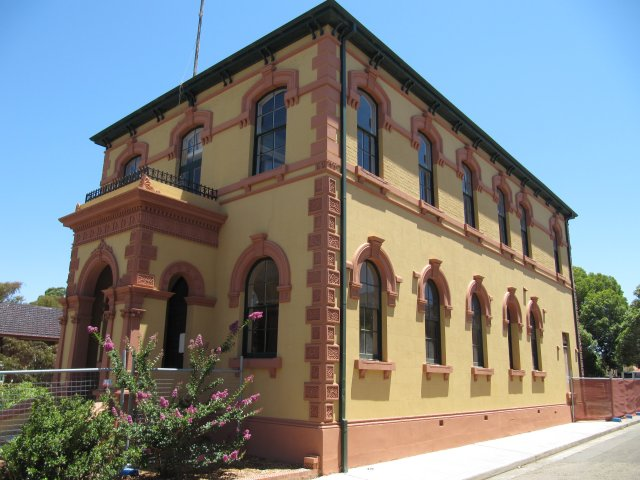
The old town hall at 96-106 Illawarra Road, Marrickville

Winged Victory, a sculpture of Nike, the Greek goddess of victory, was unveiled outside the site of the future town hall in 1919 before a crowd of approximately 15,000. The sculpture was commissioned to represent a memorial to the 450 residents who died in combat during World War I. Over the years the sculpture deteriorated and it was removed in 2009. In April 2015 a modern, more peaceful interpretation, being a 4-metre (13 ft) bronze statute of Nike was unveiled.

== See also ==
- List of town halls in Sydney
- Architecture of Sydney
