= Stead House =

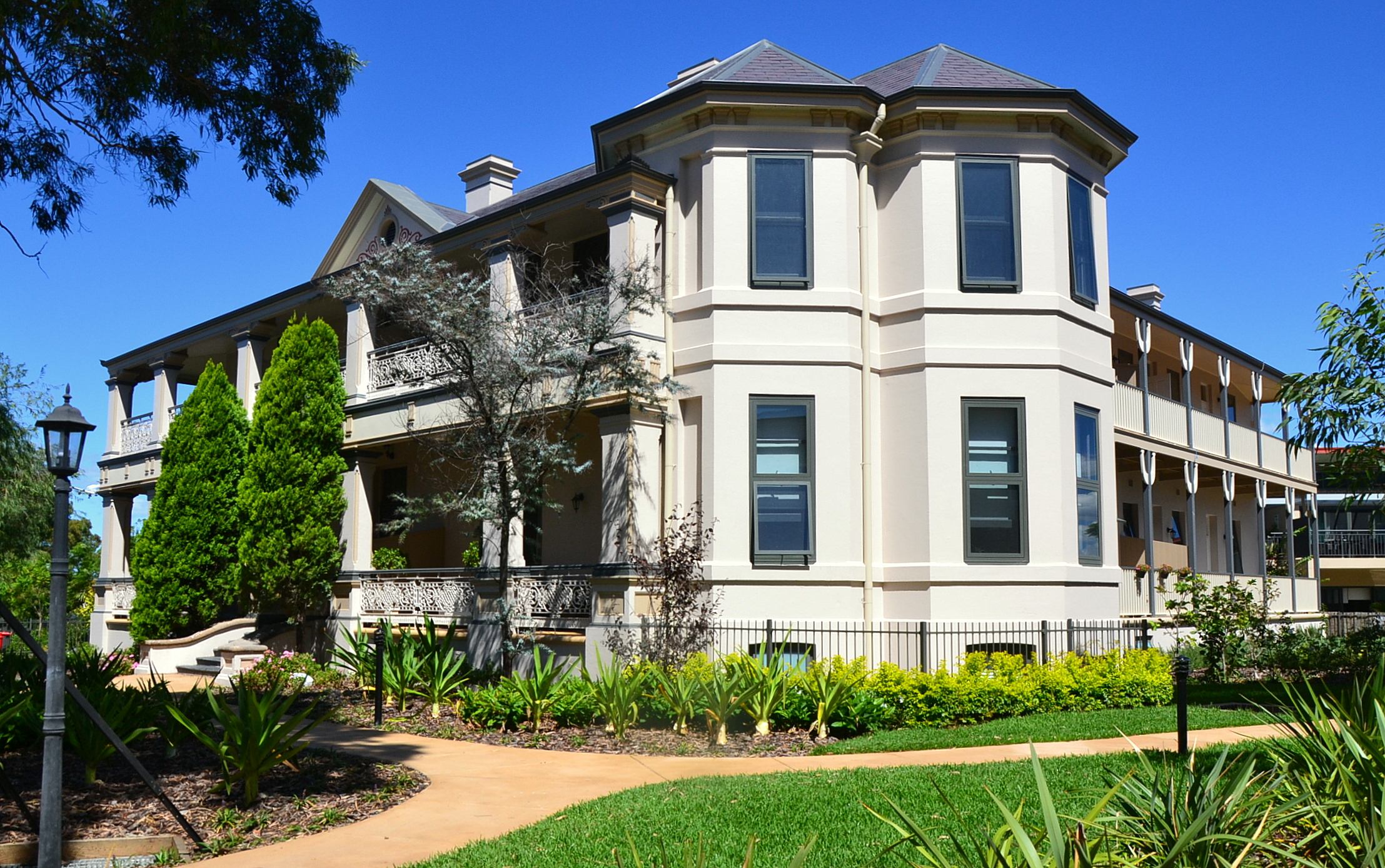
- Stead House, after conversion to apartments in 2011
- Interactive map of the Stead House area
- Former names: Bethesda House, Frankfurt Villa; Waterloo Villa

General information
- Type: House
- Architectural style: Victorian Italianate
- Location: 80 Victoria Street and 12 Leicester Street, Marrickville, Sydney, New South Wales, Australia
- Coordinates: 33°54′22″S 151°10′09″E
- Construction started: c. 1850

New South Wales Heritage Database (Local Government Register)
- Official name: Stead House (circa 1850s, also known as Frankfort Villa and Waterloo Villa); Bethesda House; Stead House
- Type: Built
- Criteria: a., e., f., g.
- Designated: 12 December 2011
- Reference no.: Local register

Stead House is a Victorian Italianate residence located at 12 Leicester Street, Marrickville, an inner western suburb of Sydney, New South Wales, Australia. The residence was established as Waterloo Villa in the early 1850s by Archibald Mitchell on part of the 12-hectare (30-acre) grant known as Wain's Farm. Stead House is an excellent example of a remnant grand estate house that is the product of a series of alterations and additions by owner Samuel Cook, manager of The Sydney Morning Herald in the late 19th century and The Salvation Army who purchased the property in 1911, following Cook's death in 1910.

== Description and background ==
The current Italianate presentation of the house to Leicester Street was carried out by Samuel Cook in 1892, as an embellishment of Mitchell's Waterloo Villa, renamed Frankford Villa in 1864 and subsequently Frankfort House during Cook's ownership. The Italianate makeover can be dated precisely due to detailed surveys found in the various field books of Public Works Department surveyor D. C. White who surveyed Frankfort House in 1891, and again in 1893.

During Cook's ownership the house was set in a renowned garden with stands of exotic trees, a large Moreton Bay fig, carriage loop and much vaunted rose beds to the east. Following the demise of Cook in 1910, his children subdivided the estate and sold it off, primarily as housing lots, but retaining a parcel of land associated with the house (including four house allotments to the north on Victoria Road, and one to the south fronting Leicester Street) at the corner of Victoria Road and the then newly created Leicester Street.

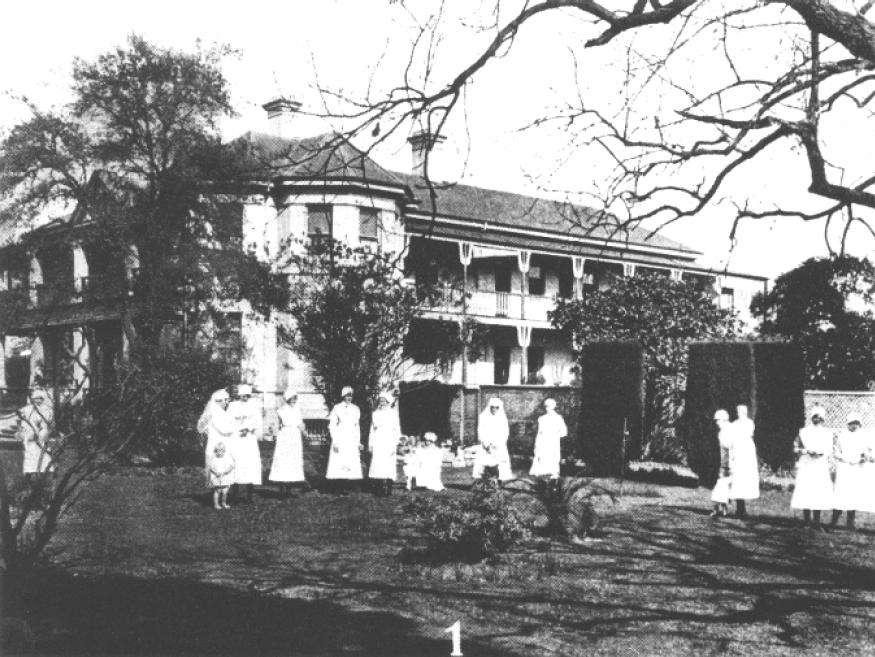
Hopeleigh Maternity Home, 1936

The house was purchased by The Salvation Army in July 1911 at which time the house, renamed Hopeleigh, was deemed "...rather small and will allow only 32 beds for inmates...". In 1912 a wing was added to the rear northern portion to increase accommodation and it was licensed as a hospital in November 1916. In 1926 an additional wing was added to the rear southern portion and included specialist medical/obstetrics facilities.

The ensuing years saw ongoing changes such as the enclosure of verandas and balconies and internal partitioning to increase capacity. The 1912 wing also effectively reoriented the building to face north to Victoria Road rather than east to Leicester Street. A formal garden was established with trellised walks between Hopeleigh and Victoria Road.

The early post World War II period saw increasing pressure on accommodation and compliance with regulations. In 1955 construction of a purpose-built maternity hospital to the Victoria Road frontage commenced and that building was opened as the new Bethesda Hospital in March 1957. The former maternity hospital was refitted as nurse's quarters with some ancillary facilities, such as a kitchen and laundry, servicing the new hospital out of the basement.

Bethesda Hospital in turn became difficult to operate due to its size and ongoing compliance with regulations, so hospital operations ceased in July 1973. Hopeleigh was named Stead House in honour of the matron of Bethesda Hospital, which was refitted as a convalescent home during the mid 1970s. Stead House continued as a hostel for female students and women of low income in the ensuing years; however, the difficulties of fire regulation compliance and ongoing maintenance costs, together with the closure of the adjoining convalescent home in 2007, prompted The Salvation Army to dispose of both the properties.

Stead House was listed on the Inner West Council local government heritage register in March 1999.

== History of the site ==
Stead House is a complex palimpsest of the following eras.

=== Wain's Farm (1795–1839) ===
The original land was part of a 12-hectare (30-acre) grant by Governor William Paterson to James Waine from Northampton who was a convict on the Second Fleet (the "Scarborough"). Waine was convicted on 4 April 1788 for the theft of five turkeys and was transported for seven years. The grant was consequential to his ticket of leave. The 12-hectare (30-acre) grant in 1795 was seemingly a relatively early emancipist grant. Unfortunately there is no documentary evidence discovered as to structures associated with the occupation of the farm under the grant conditions.

=== Waterloo Villa (1839–1865) ===
Archibald Mitchell was the owner of the land between 1839 and 1865 and, according to the Sands Directory, the name changed in 1865 to Frankford [sic] Villa with Archibald Mitchell still in residence, suggesting some change in the nature of the house. It appears that Mitchell borrowed heavily against the property and was sold-up by the mortgagee Jane M. Dunsmere, who possibly had to force the sale as her husband John appeared to have died around 1864. There is apparent fabric evidence from the earlier "Waterloo Villa" period in the presence of the front door and fanlight, multi-paned windows to the original north and rear walls, a bead and butt door, the six panel doors and some of the joinery trim.

=== Frankfort Villa (1865–1911) ===
Samuel Cook purchased the property for £2800 from Jane M. Dunsmere in 1865. Prior to this he resided in Enmore Road, Newtown and was described as a "reporter". He became manager of The Sydney Morning Herald in 1892 and, it appears, discharged the mortgage on Frankfort Villa, undertook extensive works including the paired semi-octagonal bays, Italianate embellishments to the exterior and seemingly the re-stylisation of the interior around that time. The field books of the Department of Public Works surveyor D. C. White show a significant alteration in the footprint of the house between the 1891 and 1893 surveys. The somewhat mannered Italianate motifs to the veranda columns and the console brackets, strings and chimney detailing and photographic evidence of the decorative veranda beam indicate a "make-over" in the latter part of the period of Italianate influence. In 1905 the residence was noted for its garden which was described by The Sydney Mail as the "most beautiful suburban garden in Sydney". Cook's children are listed in Sands as residents of the house as of 1911, but appear to have preferred to realise the value of the property and subsequently subdivided and sold the estate off. Frankfort Villa and associated land, was bought by The Salvation Army in August 1911.

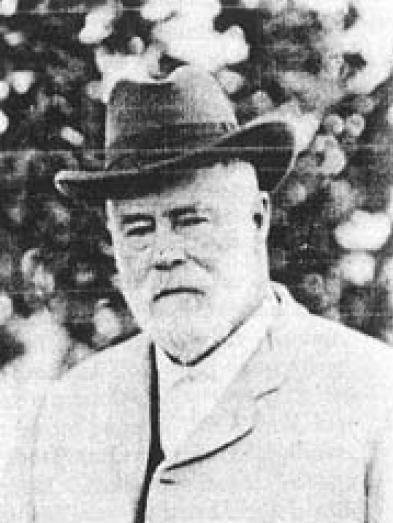
Samuel Cook, c. 1905

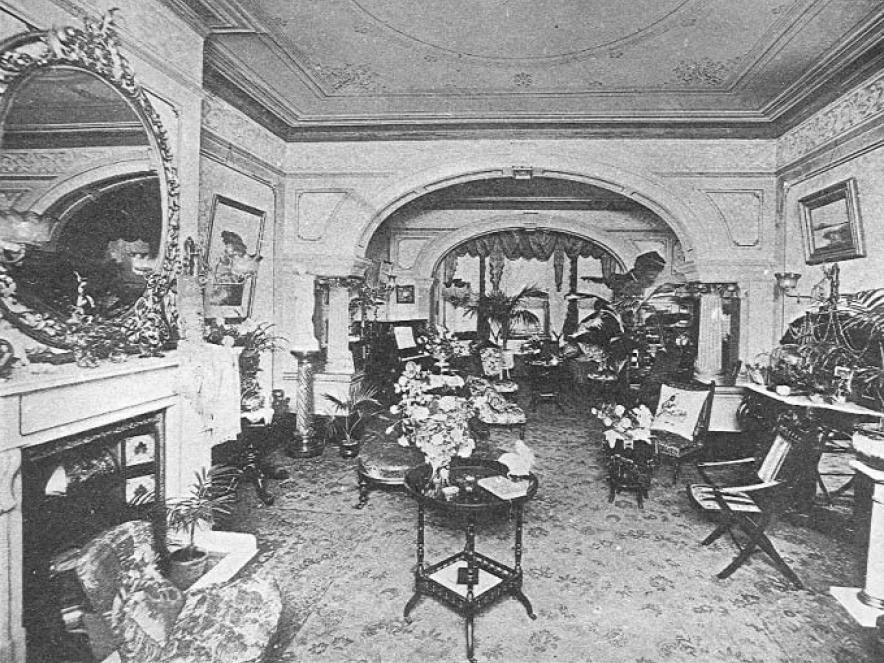
Frankfort, drawing room, 1905

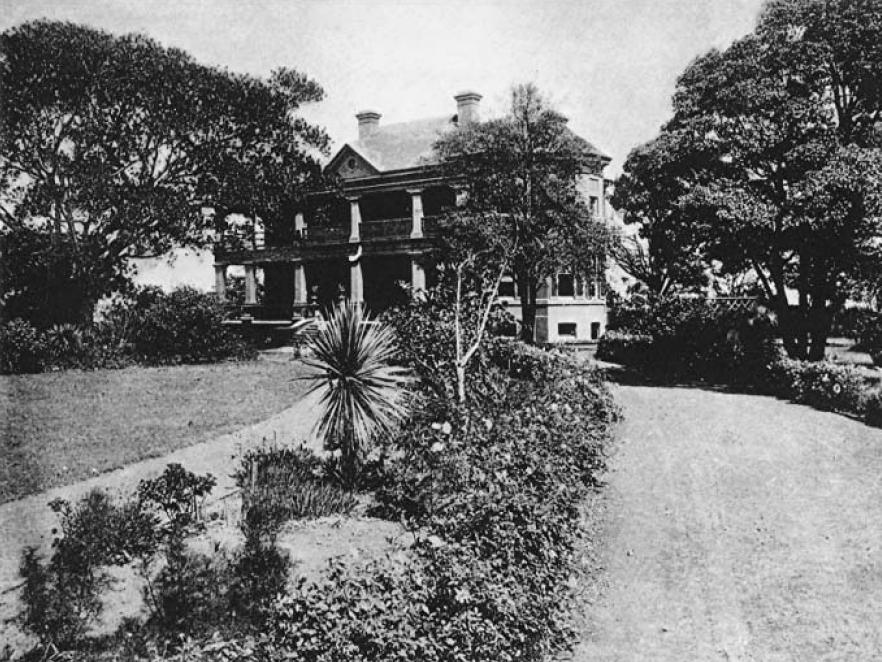
General view, 1905

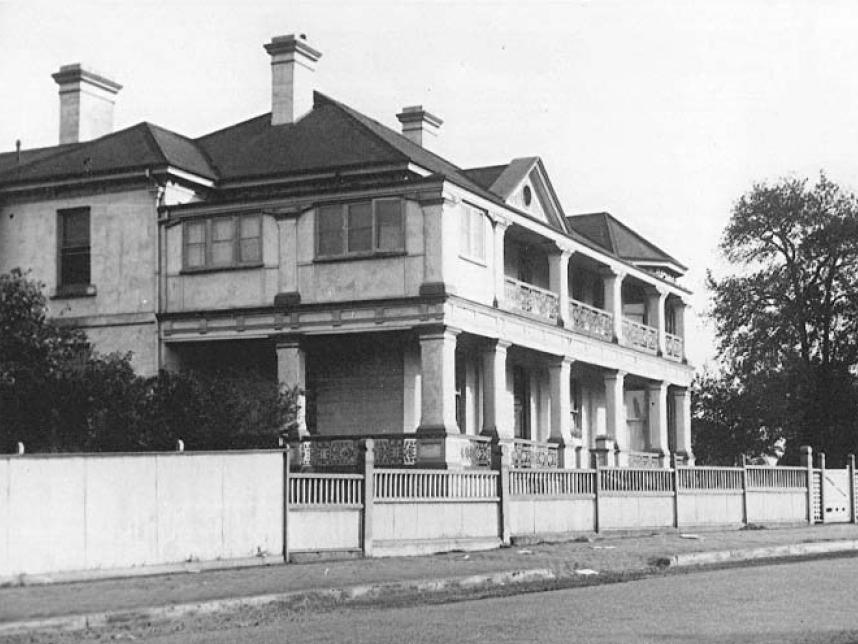
Hopeleigh Maternity Home, 1927

=== Hopeleigh/Hopeleigh Maternity Home (1911–c.1936) ===
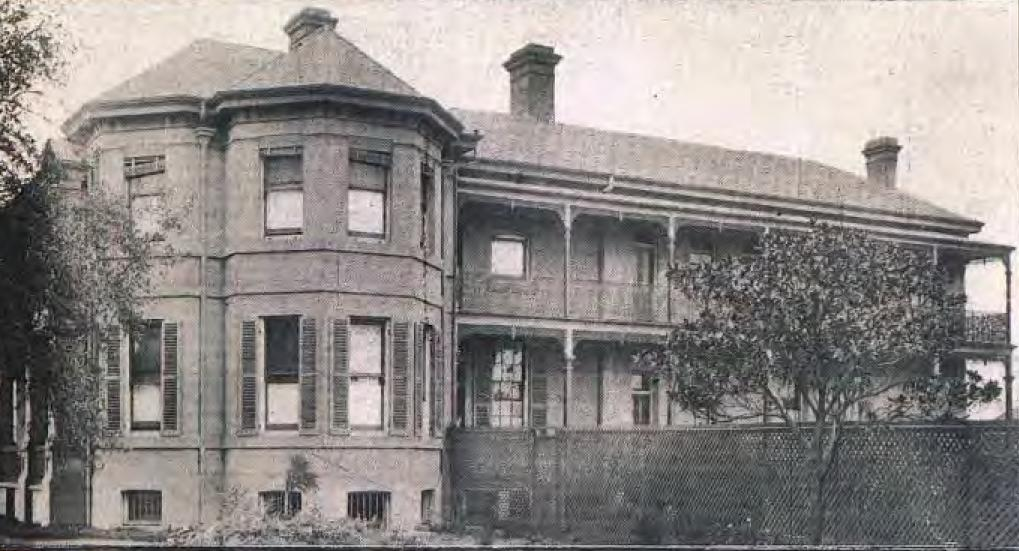
Hopeleigh Maternity Home, 1915.

Shortly after taking possession of the rather small Frankfort Villa, The Salvation Army proceeded to enlarge the house through the construction of the northern wing. This addition consisted of a verandah to the north and south walls and the rooms, seemingly used for residential accommodation for the staff, appear to have been accessed off the verandahs. A 1915 image shows cast iron columns, lace balustrades and friezes in the Victorian manner. A 1936 image displays the same the verandah in a more livery appearance with an Arts and Crafts influence and constructed in timber, a curious change in such a relatively short period of time, particularly in the light of apparent funding constraints. The south wing appears to have been built in 1925/26 in response to both increasing accommodation pressures and the need to have purpose built medical facilities. Enclosure of certain areas such as the upper south verandah of the house occurred at this time, and the verandahs to the south wing shortly after, indicating severe accommodation pressure. Damage relating to a severe storm in 1937 prompted the eventual re-roofing of the original slate roof in concrete tiles and asymmetrical re-framing of the roof to the south wing.

=== Bethesda Hospital/Stead House (c. 1936–present) ===
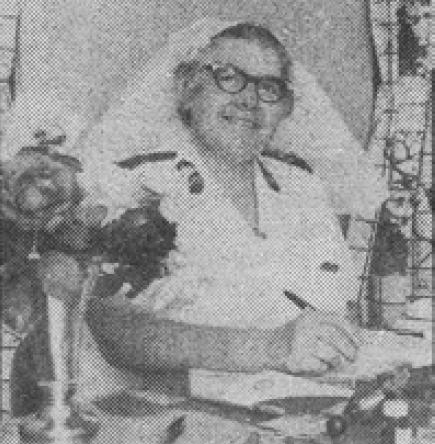
Doris Stead, c. 1955.

It appears there was something of a hiatus during the late 1930s to the early 1950s in terms of building activity. A new hospital was built in 1955–57 and seemingly the name Bethesda Hospital transferred to the new building with what is now Stead House used as accommodation for staff. It also appears the basement of Stead House was fitted out with a commercial kitchen and laundry to service the new hospital and a link structure built. Following the demise of the Bethesda Hospital in 1973, it appears the name Stead House was given to the subject building in honour of the founding matron of the new Bethesda Hospital, Lieutenant Colonel Doris Stead. Stead House became a hostel for women students and low income earners up until recently, when the economic and fire regulation compliance issues became insurmountable and it was placed on the market. The house was acquired by the Boyce Group and converted into apartments in 2011.

== Style analysis ==
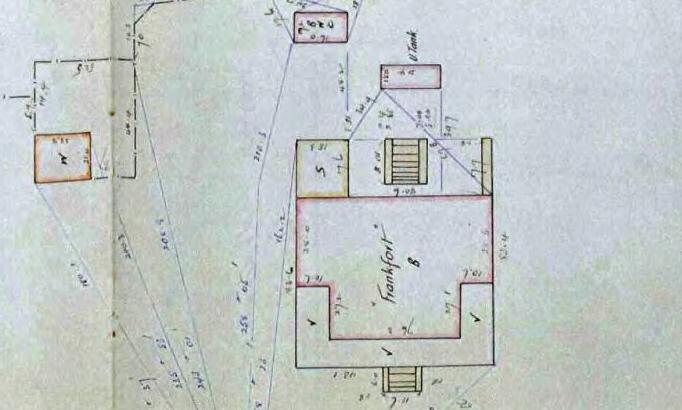
Frankfort, 1891

Richard Apperly, Robert Irving and Peter Reynolds, in their A Pictorial Guide to Identifying Australian Architecture…. (1989) determine a series of styles based on "style indicators". Stead House exhibits many of the elements of the Victorian Italianate, a style which Apperly and others identify as being favoured, amongst other revivalist "romantic" styles, during the period c. 1840 to c. 1890. Indications are that the re-stylisation of Stead House occurred in 1892, so it was a relatively late iteration of the style. The striking paired semi-octagonal faceted bays are quite idiosyncratic, the imposition of asymmetrical massing through the introduction of these bays on what was previously seemingly a rigidly symmetrical composition, and the embellishments such as the stylised console brackets and moulding profiles used, all point to an Italianate style.

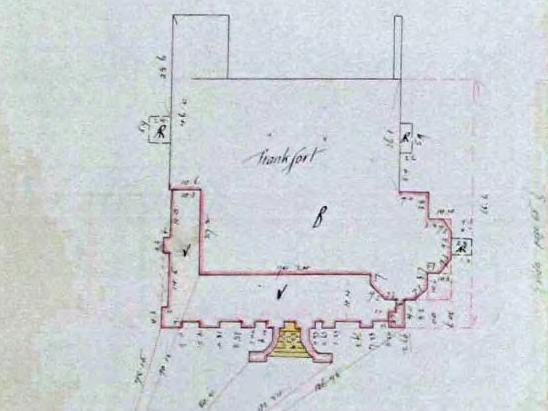
Frankfort, 1893

The internal decoration, particularly the interior semi-elliptical arch and, to some extent, the upper level joinery all point to a "make-over", given the presence of remnant Regency influenced detailing in the joinery trim, window elbow linings, and particularly the fanlight over the front entrance. The rear wings exhibit some Federation era influence (pressed metal ceilings) while there is some remnant joinery trim to the south wing ("Interwar"), though the latter has been substantially compromised by piecemeal alteration and was seemingly utilitarian when built.
