= Marrickville Post Office =

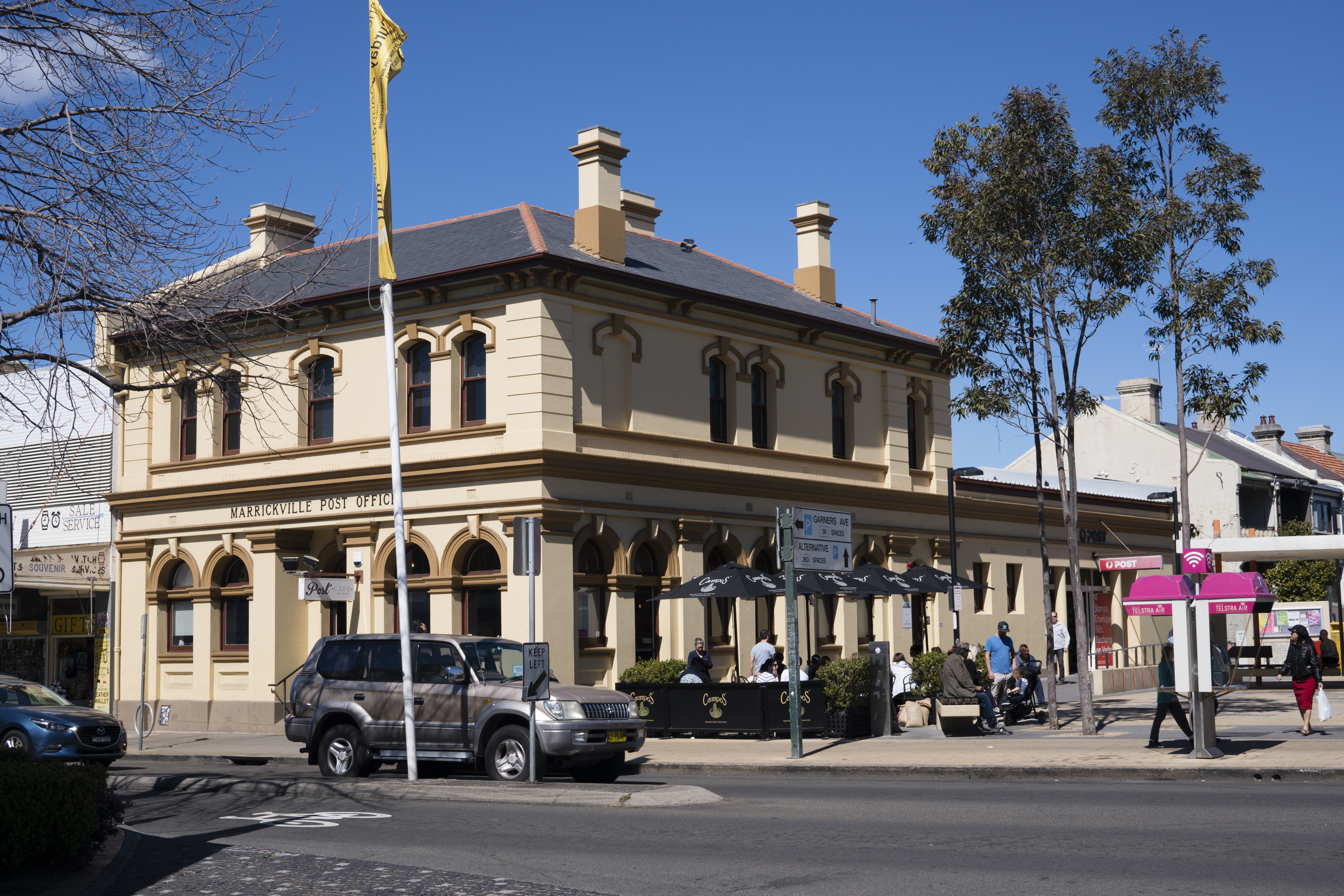
- Marrickville Post Office, 2017

- Location within Sydney
- 33.9111°S 151.1572°E
- Location: 274A Marrickville Road, Marrickville, Sydney, New South Wales, Australia

Commonwealth Heritage List
- Official name: Marrickville Post Office
- Type: Listed place (Historic)
- Designated: 22 August 2012
- Reference no.: 106204
- Builders: Messrs Graham and Mercer

Marrickville Post Office is a heritage-listed post office at 274A Marrickville Road, Marrickville, Sydney, New South Wales, Australia. It was added to the Australian Commonwealth Heritage List on 22 August 2012.

== History ==
Marrickville Post Office was constructed by Messrs Graham and Mercer for £2,197 and opened in April 1891. Its construction followed the late nineteenth century establishment or shift of the main business and commercial district of Marrickville to this area of the suburb, in turn following the construction of the tramline along Marrickville Road to Illawarra Road in 1881.

The original building included a post office, residence and telegraph office. Extensive alterations were made to the rear single-storey portion in c.1960, and an addition was also built to the rear of this wing. The post office is now located towards the rear of the building and a café occupies the original postal hall.

Built in 1891, extensive alterations were made to the rear single-storey portion in c.1960.

== Description ==
Marrickville Post Office is at 274A Marrickville Road, Marrickville, on the corner of Silver Street, comprising the whole of Lot 1 Section 2 DP1943 and Lot 1 DP780055. The site is on a flat and gently tapering.

The building frontage to Marrickville Road is two-storied with loosely Renaissance articulation: pilasters on each side of a central doorway on the ground floor, two arched windows either side, and a reproduction of this pattern in the five first floor windows. The first floor was treated as an astylar piano nobile/attic. The pattern was inverted on the Silver Street side, facing northwest, where two entrances were placed at either end of the double-storeyed section's street front, with two bays containing a pair of arched windows placed between each entrance. A pilaster separates the two bays of windows.

It is possible that the Silver Street elevation may not have been the side elevation as intended. The rear doorway is flanked by piers, rusticated on the upper level and treated as pilasters on the ground floor, in a distinctly separate bay. This may be an addition or alteration, but was possibly intended as the base of a corner tower. A rear tower placement was not usual in James Barnet designs, but nearby Leichhardt Post Office (1887–88), has a rear-sited tower along its major roadside elevation, rather than a corner tower at its main public entrance. The upper level to Silver Street therefore appears asymmetrically, as the extra bay adds on to a symmetrical five-window elevation. One of the Silver Street upper windows is blind, though with its full drip moulding and segmental arch, this may have been intended as a compositional counterbalance to the extra bay at the south end. All upper windows have partly aedicular treatment with segmentally curved stilted drip mouldings, accentuated keystones and a continuous sill that forms part of a ground floor-first floor entablature. The windows are generally double hung sashes. The roof is on a bracketed cornice, with sparsely and irregularly applied brackets in pairs, and in places, as a trio, which is geared to the varied window placements on the Marrickville Road and Silver Street elevations.

A single storey extension was added to the rear (date unknown). This sustains the prominent entablature mouldings that run across the original facades, but much of its original fenestration and Classical detailing has been removed. The Silver Street elevation of this single-storey section now consists of a wide entrance with two plain pillars, creating a tripartite arrangement, and two small square windows. The internal timber stairs have been reconfigured. The stairs of the original two storey portion extend into part of the single-storey rear addition, and at the top of the stairs turned timber balustrading has been removed and replaced with a timber panel.

In about 1994 the post office was transformed into a shared tenancy with an Australia Post retail area dominating one area and a café the other. Australia Post retained its operations in the single-storey building and upstairs it has a lunchroom, storeroom and toilets. The café also leases two rooms upstairs for storage space. On the upper level much of the original fabric is intact and the original planning is still evident.

The café now occupies most of the ground floor of the two-storey portion of the building, which accommodates a dining area, kitchen and toilets. The two iron columns with Corinthian capitals in the ground floor café, are believed to have been present when the space was a post office and are probably original. It was possibly around the time that the c.1994 works were completed that an addition was made to the south of the single-storey portion, covering what was formerly a yard.

=== Key areas/elements ===
- North (Marrickville Road) and east (Silver Street) elevations.
- Former postal hall, including its iron columns.
- Timber stair.

=== Condition ===
The building overall has a moderate level of intactness and a fair level of condition given changes in the program and the age of the building.

=== Original fabric ===
Original elements of the building include:

- Structural frame: reinforced concrete footings (underpinned later). Timber flooring and roof frames, load-bearing brick walls.
- External walls: rendered brick.
- Internal walls: brick rendered in hard plaster and painted. Other walls are timber frame that are clad in plasterboard and painted.
- Floor: timber framed. Polished timber within the café tenancy. Carpeted to the retail area and the rear office flooring is vinyl. Vinyl tiled lunch room and storage areas; ceramic tiled wet areas.
- Ceiling: acoustic ceiling tiles (café area); in the retail space and back office it has a suspended ceiling with aluminium frame and inset acoustic tiles, flush fluorescent lighting mounts. Upstairs the ceilings are lath and plaster.
- Roof: timber frame, clad in cement tile.

== Heritage listing ==
Marrickville Post Office was listed on the Australian Commonwealth Heritage List on 22 August 2012 having satisfied the following criteria.

Criterion A: Processes

Marrickville Post Office of 1891, which originally incorporated a post office, telegraph office and residence, has been an important local postal building for almost 120 years. It helps demonstrate the establishment of this area as the main business and commercial focus of the suburb of Marrickville following the construction of the tramline along Marrickville Road in 1881. The post office is also one of the last designed under James Barnet's direction, before the arrival of Walter Vernon as new government architect.

Criterion D: Characteristic values

Marrickville Post Office is an example of:

- a post office and telegraph office with quarters (second generation typology 1870–1929)
- Italianate Style
- the work of architect James Barnet

Typologically, Marrickville Post Office is a medium-sized post office of the late nineteenth century that incorporated a post office and telegraph office with quarters. The building overall has a moderate level of intactness, including externally, with works concentrated towards the rear. More recently, Australia Post operations have also contracted in the building, with adaptation to café use occurring. These works retained much of the first floor internal planning, with much of the original fabric intact in these spaces. The café occupies most of the ground floor of the two-storey portion of the building, including using these spaces as a dining area, kitchen and toilets.

Stylistically and architecturally, the building fits neatly into contemporary retail architecture on its Marrickville Road side, albeit assuming a more singular character on the Silver Street elevation (where it is thought a tower was originally intended). The post office is also a sedate building which reads more like a medium-sized bank branch than a post office, merging into the retail fabric of Marrickville Road. Nevertheless, the building has a competent Italianate facade treatment, and a determined symmetry to the Marrickville Road elevation which is counteracted by a direct inversion of the window spacing and placements on the two Silver Street levels. This approach to corner design was unusual in the post offices of James Barnet.

Criterion E: Aesthetic characteristics

As noted under criterion D above, architecturally and stylistically, the exterior of the Marrickville Post Office fits neatly into contemporary retail architecture on its Marrickville Road side, albeit assuming a more singular character on the Silver Street elevation. Externally the building has retained much of its original character, including Italianate detailing, and is a significant historic corner-sited building within the Marrickville Road context.

Criterion H: Significant people

Marrickville Post Office is significant for its association with the prolific post office architect James Barnet, and is believed to be one of the last of the postal buildings designed under his direction, before the arrival of Walter Vernon as the new government architect.
