= Premier Street Sewer Vent and Cottages =

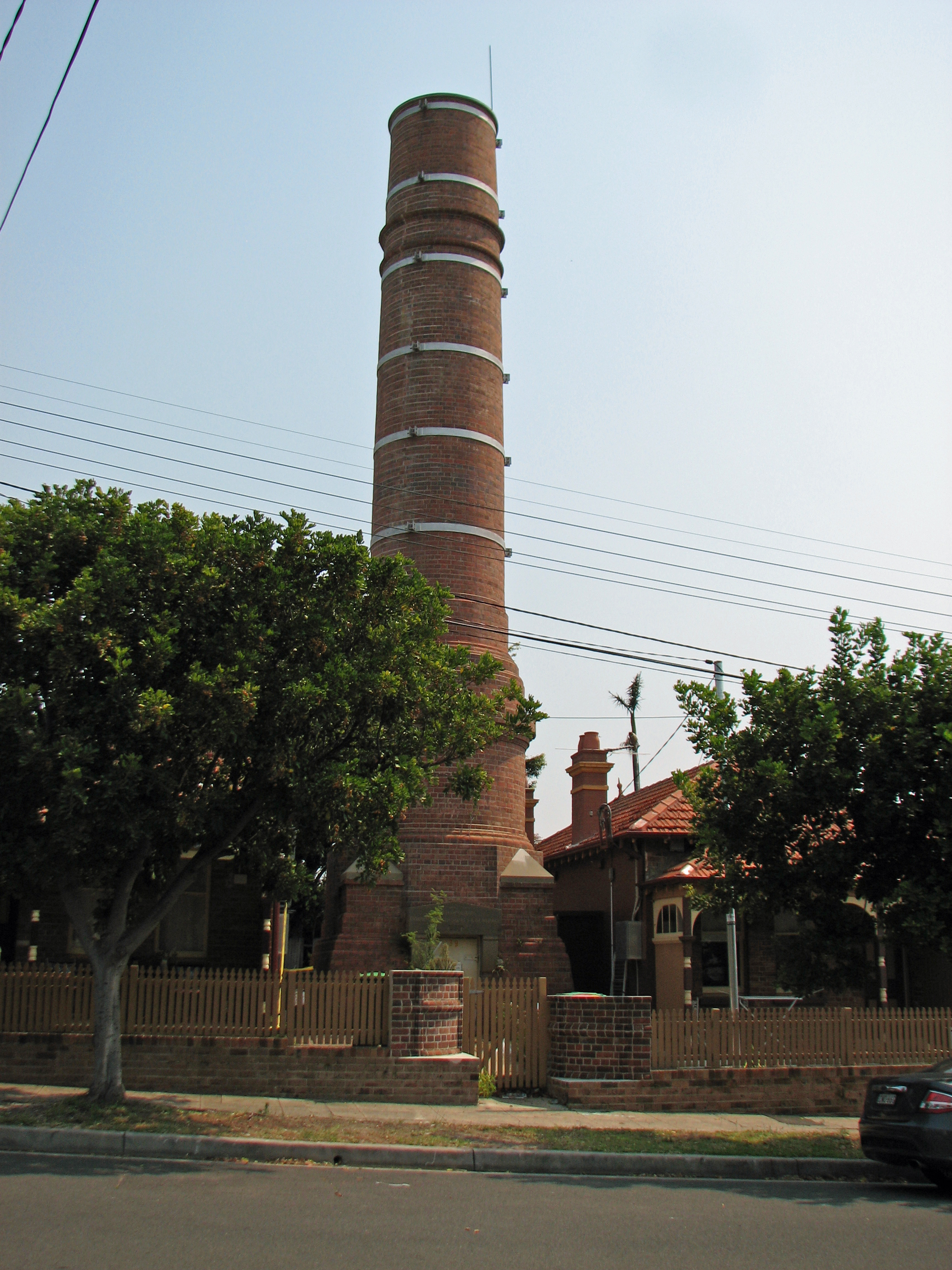
- Premier Street Sewer Vent and Cottages

- Location within Sydney Location within Australia
- 33.9188°S 151.1489°E
- Location: 24, 26 Premier Street, Marrickville, Inner West Council, Sydney, New South Wales, Australia

History
- Built: 1898–1900

Site notes
- Architect: Public Works Dept.
- Owner: Sydney Water

New South Wales Heritage Register
- Official name: Sewer Vent and Cottages; Premier Street Sewer Vent and Cottages
- Type: state heritage (built)
- Designated: 15 November 2002
- Reference no.: 1636
- Type: Other - Utilities - Sewerage
- Category: Utilities - Sewerage
- Builders: Public Works Dept.

Premier Street Sewer Vent and Cottages is a state heritage-listed sewer vent and cottages at 24 and 26 Premier Street, Marrickville, New South Wales, Australia.

It was built between 1898 and 1900, and designed by the New South Wales Public Works Department. It was added to the New South Wales State Heritage Register on 15 November 2002.

== Description ==
=== Location ===
The Sewer vent and cottages sit on a residential street which contains houses of various designs, including detached late Victorian, and turn of the 20th century. Some of these houses were altered in the late 20th century.

Below the stack is a penstock chamber, which forms the junction of three sewer mains:

- The Eastern Main Branch: reticulating Marrickville, Petersham, Newtown, Leichhardt, Annandale and Camperdown
- The Northern Main Branch: reticulating Marrickville, Petersham, Annandale, Leichhardt and Ashfield
- The Western Main Branch: reticulating Ashfield, Burwood, Drummoyne, Strathfield, Concord and Homebush

The Outfall Main originally led to the sewage farm at Rockdale, but from 1916 has been connected to the Southern and Western Suburbs Ocean Outfall Sewer (SWSOOS), terminating at the Long Bay treatment works at Malabar.

The vent shaft is particularly visible within the landscape from the south, as it sits on the southern side of a hill.

=== Vent ===
The sewer vent stack is made of moulded bricks. The brick stack is constructed of moulded bricks, with conventional proportions, detailing and entasis. During the late 20th century, the shaft was reinforced with steel bands. A concrete band supporting the capital (upper part) of the shaft was possibly added in the mid to late 20th century.

In the base of the stack sits a steel door. This opens to irons rungs fixed in the wall, descending to the penstock chamber below.

=== Cottages ===
A pair of cottages sit on each side of the stack. These are designed in the Queen Anne Revival style and were built for the workers, a rare occurrence.

The bricks are load bearing, and laid in an English bond sequence. They retain much of the timber joinery, including the windows, doors and boarded verandah ends. Other original external features include Marseilles pattern terracotta tiles, brick chimneys and terracotta chimney pots.

Inside the cottages is much the much as it was originally, retaining many finishes and joinery. The front fence is a conservation of the original. In the early 1990s, efforts at conservation were undertaken, and these remain today. They are still used as housing, although not for workers from the Water Board.

== History ==
The Premier Street Sewer Stack was built between 1898 and 1900 by the Public Works Department. They acted on behalf of the Metropolitan Water Sewerage & Drainage Board's behalf as part of the Western Suburbs Sewerage Scheme.

The stack was shortened by 10 metres (33 ft) in 2017 to meet earthquake and wind loading codes. A number of bricks removed were repurposed to form part of the fence on either side of the vent. A large crack in the vent was also repaired.

The cottages were sold by Sydney Water in 2018 to private buyers.

== Heritage listing ==
On 15 November 2002, the Sewer Vent and Cottages were listed on the New South Wales State Heritage Register. The combination of the cottages and sewer vent in the Queen Anne revival style was deemed "rare, if not unique", and as exhibiting stone and brick craftmanship unlikely to be made again.

In the listing, the presence of cottages were considered signs of the importance placed on employees at the time of construction. Also considered important was that the vent was placed at the juncture of the main sewer branches in the west. It described the vent and cottages as likely important to the local community.
