= Sewage Pumping Station 271 =

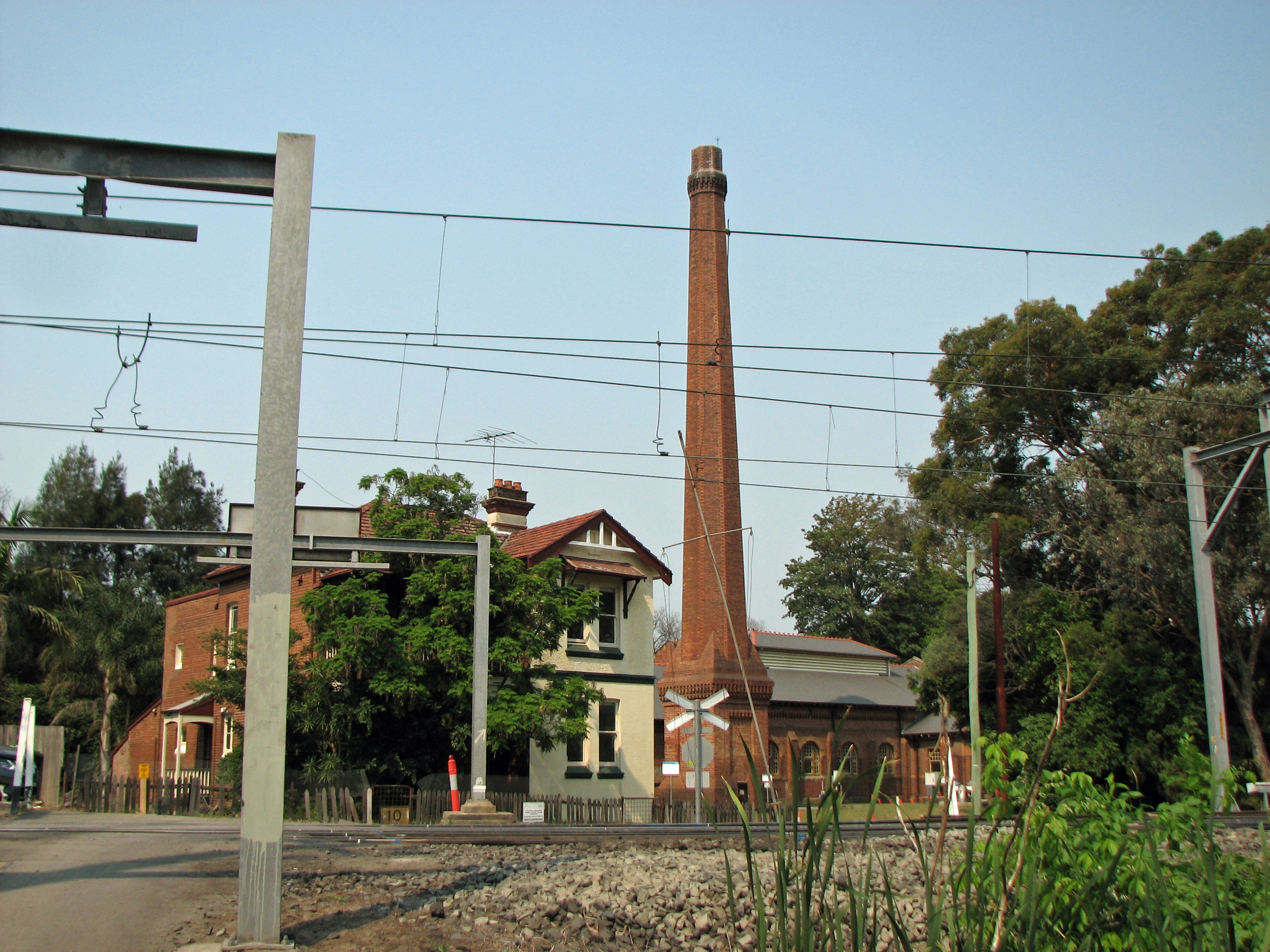
- Sewage Pumping Station 271, Carrington Road, Marrickville, New South Wales

- Location within Sydney Location within Australia
- 33.9157°S 151.1594°E
- Location: Carrington Road, Marrickville, Inner West Council, Sydney, New South Wales, Australia

Site notes
- Architect: Public Works Department
- Owner: Sydney Water

New South Wales Heritage Register
- Official name: Sewage Pumping Station 271; SPS 271
- Type: state heritage (built)
- Designated: 18 November 1999
- Reference no.: 1342
- Type: Sewage Pump House/Pumping Station
- Category: Utilities - Sewerage
- Builders: Public Works Dept.

Sewage Pumping Station 271 is a heritage-listed sewage pumping station located adjacent to 5 Carrington Road, Marrickville, Inner West Council, Sydney, New South Wales, Australia. It was designed and built by the New South Wales Public Works Department. It is also known as SPS 271. The property is owned by Sydney Water. It was added to the New South Wales State Heritage Register on 18 November 1999.

== History ==
In 1889, the newly constructed Board of Water Supply and Sewerage assumed responsibility for the water and sewerage service from the City Council. This instigated a gradual move away from the practise of combining sewerage and stormwater and led to the commencement of the BOOS which discharged into the ocean at Bondi and the South Western system which drained to a sewage farm at Botany. A series of low level sewage pumping stations were constructed to transport waste against gravity by means of a series of rising mains. The Carrington Road Pumping Station was built in the late 1890s, and handed over to the Metropolitan Board of Water Supply and Sewerage in 1900.

The low level portions of Marrickville, Newtown, Erskineville, Alexandria and St Peters are still serviced by a low level sewer which discharges into the wells of Marrickville Pumping Station. The sewage is then pumped to the high level of the Eastern Branch of the SWOOS. Marrickville SPS also receives stormwater discharge from the Central stormwater channel during certain high tides in the Cooks River.

== Description ==
The Marrickville SPS complex consists of a combined boiler house and engine room, a large chimney stack and a residence. The residence is an unadorned two-storey brick building designed in Federation Queen Anne style. Masonry is English bond and the facade is accentuated by timber filigree detailing. The pumping station/ boiler house is designed in classic Federation Romanesque style. Decorative Gothic buttresses with steep copings flank its sides, round headed windows surmounted by arches of rusticated sandstone typify the window openings, and the walls and gables are accentuated by machicolation motifs. The gables have sandstone copings with bracketed kneelers. The windows are small paned figured glass with pivotal awnings typical of the Federation style. The internal doors are round-headed diagonal-panelled double doors and are similar in style to the external doors. The building originally had a slate roof with terracotta hips, ridges and finials. Both the boiler and engine house have since been clad in terracotta tile. The gable roofs have monitors, which are centrally placed and continue approximately half the length of the roof and are fitted with fixed steel louvres. The roof truss in the engine house is a delicate hand-wrought Warren truss strengthened internally with matchboarding. The exposed rafters are rounded on the ends, and this attention to detail is typical of the quality of carpentry throughout. The internal pilasters, which correspond with the buttresses, hold the overhead crane rail. The overhead crane is a simple undertrussed steel-girder hand-operated crane typical of the early twentieth century. The chimney stack is polychromatic brickwork on a square base which changes to an octagonal shaft some three metres above the ground. It is finished with an ornate cap. The stack is a local landmark.

The station is substantially intact and in good condition. The Residence building is in good condition and the fabric is substantially intact.

== Heritage listing ==
SPS 271 displays a high level of architectural sophistication in the execution of Federation Queen Anne and Romanesque styles. It has the highest level of aesthetic significance of pumping stations within the Sydney Water sewerage system and is the most intact example of a pair of stylistically complete Federation industrial buildings. It is technologically unique (one of only three of its type), having the dual function of carrying both sewage and stormwater. It has a high level of industrial archaeological value evidenced by the Blackstone three cylinder diesel pump (steam driven until 1954) which dates from c. 1920, and an outstanding level of technological significance due to the manner and method in which it functioned within the SWOOS system. It had the unique capability of pumping waste from the sewage wells to either the high-level sewer or the eastern stormwater channel. It is one of the oldest SPSs still functioning, and presently discharges into the SWOOS.

Sewage Pumping Station 271 was listed on the New South Wales State Heritage Register on 18 November 1999.
