= Costa Prasoulas =

Australian actor and martial artist

Costa Prasoulas is an Australian actor and martial artist trained in Muay Thai, Hapkido, Taekwondo, Pankration and Brazilian Jiu-Jitsu, having won the Australian Open Martial Arts Championship in 1992, Intercontinental Kickboxing Champion and won a silver medal at the 2009 World Games. His acting credits include Cop's Enemy.
