= List of Old Boys of The Scots College (Sydney) =

This is a List of notable Old Boys of The Scots College, they being notable former students – known as "Old Boys" of the Presbyterian Church school, The Scots College in Bellevue Hill, New South Wales, Australia.

== Academic ==
- Tony Rae AM, a former chairman of the Headmasters' Conference of the Independent Schools of Australia
- Peter van Onselen, a professor of politics and journalism at the University of Western Australia

=== Rhodes scholars ===
- 1928: Richard Ashburner – BA University of Sydney
- 1929: Ian Edwards – BA University of Sydney
- 1946: Lloyd Stuart Williams – BEng University of Sydney
- 1980: Philip John Crowe – MB BS University of Sydney

== Business ==
- James Bain, a company director, farmer, author; Chairman of NatWest Aust. Bank Ltd (1985–91), W. Bain & Co. (1947–87); Sydney Stock Exchange Ltd (1983–87) (also attended The Armidale School)
- Charles Kiefel AM, a senior non-executive director and chairman in global funds management and investment banking. Awarded an AM in June 2019 “for significant service to Australia–United States relations, and to philanthropy”, and an OAM “for service to the superannuation and funds management industries and as a supporter of charitable and educational institutions.”
- Lee Freedman, a racehorse trainer with 120 career Group one wins including five Melbourne Cups, four Golden Slippers, four Caulfield Cups, four VRC Oaks, four Australasian Oaks, five Lightning Stakes, two Cox Plates, one AJC Oaks
- Ted Harris AC, a company director, tennis commentator and sport administrator
- Justin Hemmes, an entrepreneur and principal of the Merivale Group
- Ezra Norton, a former newspaper proprietor (also attended Waverley College)
- Tom Parry AM, an economist and public servant
- Robert Somervaille AO, a legal and telecommunications technology consultant and company director; awarded the Légion d'honneur (also attended Scotch College Melbourne)
- Harry Triguboff AO, a property developer and billionaire owner of Meriton Apartments

== Clergy ==
- Dr. Peter Jensen, former Anglican Archbishop of Sydney
- Rt. Rev. Ian Shevill, an Anglican Bishop

== Community ==
- Ian Kiernan AO, an environmentalist who founded Clean Up Australia, and Clean Up The World (also attended The Armidale School)

== Media, entertainment and the arts ==
- Conway Bown, war artist and Army helicopter pilot
- Luke Bracey, an actor, best known for his roles in The November Man and in The Best of Me
- Callan McAuliffe, an actor, best known for his roles in the romantic comedy drama film Flipped and in the teen action science fiction film I Am Number Four
- Roger McDonald, a poet and writer
- Scott McGregor, an actor and presenter on the Seven Network's Better Homes and Gardens
- Sam Parsonson, an actor
- Peter van Onselen, a political commentator and biographer
- Tim Webster, a newsreader and sports presenter
- Peter Weir AM, a film director (The Truman Show, The Cars That Ate Paris, Dead Poets Society)
- Brett Whiteley, an artist (also attended The Scots School, Bathurst) Whiteley disliked attending The Scots College, Sydney, and was expelled for stealing from the newsagency in Double Bay
- Rusty Young, an author
- Hiroaki Yura, a violin virtuoso, founder and concertmaster of the Eminence Symphony Orchestra

== Medicine and science ==
- Graeme Clark AC, a pioneer of the multiple-channel cochlear implant (also attended Sydney Boys High School)
- Gerald Lawrie, an American heart surgeon and pioneer in the surgical treatment of valvular heart disease
- Dr Charlie Teo AM, a neurosurgeon and founder of the Cure Brain Cancer Foundation

== Military ==
- Arthur Aspinall, together with Archibald John, Andrew Eric and William Robert Aspinall
- Arnold Brown OBE, MC, DSO, an Australian Army officer; decorated for services in Cyrenaica
- Rear Admiral The Hon Sir David James Martin KCMG, AO, former Governor of NSW and a former senior officer of the Royal Australian Navy
- Vice Admiral Sir Alan McNicoll KBE, CB, GM, a senior officer in the Royal Australian Navy and a diplomat
- Major-General Ronald McNicoll CBE, AM
- Colonel Rowan Tink AM, a former Australian Army Special Air Service Regiment commander, awarded the US Bronze Star following active duty in Afghanistan

== Politics, public service and the law ==
=== Judiciary ===
- Graham Armitage QC, an acting Judge of the District Court of New South Wales and retired Judge of the District Court of New South Wales (1989–2006); a former Crown Prosecutor (1975–86)
- Murray Wilcox AO, QC, Judge of the Federal Court of Australia (1984–2006), Judge of the ACT Supreme Court (1983–2006), Chief Justice of the Industrial Relations Court of Australia (1994–2006)

=== Politics ===
- Alexander Armstrong, a pastoralist and Member of the New South Wales Legislative Council representing the Liberal Party of Australia (1953–69)
- Richard Bull, a former Member of the New South Wales Legislative Council representing the National Party of Australia (1984–2000)
- Joseph Calcraft OBE, a Member of the New South Wales Legislative Council; Councillor at Shoalhaven Council (1962–65)
- Peter Dowding SC, a barrister and former Premier of Western Australia (also attended Caulfield Grammar School and Hale School)
- David Drummond, a former Member of the New South Wales Legislative Assembly and the Australian House of Representatives representing the Country Party
- Ralph Hunt AO, a former Member of the House of Representatives for Gwydir (1969–89) representing the National Party of Australia
- John Jobling AO, a former member of the New South Wales Legislative Council representing the Liberal Party of Australia and local councillor
- Wal Murray, a former Deputy Premier of New South Wales and Leader of the NSW National Party
- The Hon Cameron Murphy AM MLC, Member of the New South Wales Legislative Council for the Australian Labor Party and Union organiser.
- The Hon Andrew Hastie MP, a Liberal Party member of the Australian House of Representatives, representing the division of Canning since 2015. Prior to politics, he was a troop commander in the Special Air Service Regiment.

=== Public service ===
- David Bennett AC, QC, a Solicitor-General of Australia; barrister; Queen's Counsel of all States (also attended Hall School, Hampstead)

=== Other notable lawyers ===
- Stuart Littlemore QC, a barrister and former host of the ABC TV's Media Watch
- Alan Loxton AM (1934), a former senior partner Allen, Allen and Hemsley

== Sport ==
=== Rugby Union ===
==== Wallabies ====
- Tom Bowman, Wallaby (1998–99)
- David Brockhoff, Wallaby player (1949–53) and coach of the Wallabies and Waratahs
- Hugh (Murray) Buntine, Wallaby (1924)
- Sam Carter, Wallaby (2014)
- Andrew Kellaway, Wallaby (2024)
- Ken Catchpole, Wallaby, 27 Tests (1961–68) and captain in 13 match
- Tim Gavin, Wallaby (1988–96)
- Phil Hardcastle, Wallaby, 5 Tests (1946–49) and captain in 1 match
- Jim Hindmarsh, Wallaby (1975–76)
- Rupert Rosenblum, Wallaby (1969–70)
- John Solomon, Wallaby, 14 Tests (1949–55) and captain in 8 matches
- Warwick Waugh, Wallaby (1993–97)

==== Super Rugby ====
- Stuart Pinkerton – Former player at NSW Waratahs
- Lei Tomiki – Former player at NSW Waratahs
- Richard Stanford – Former player at ACT Brumbies
- Henari Veratau – Former player at Queensland Reds and ACT Brumbies
- David Horwitz – Former player at NSW Waratahs
- Jack Maddocks – Former player at Melbourne Rebels and NSW Waratahs
- Andrew Kellaway – Current player at NSW Waratahs
- Daniel Botha – Current player at NSW Waratahs
- Darby Lancaster – Current player at NSW Waratahs
- Will Harris – Current player at Western Force and former player at NSW Waratahs
- Jeremy Williams – Current player at Western Force
- Darcy Breen – Current player at ACT Brumbies

=== Rugby League ===
- Angus Crichton – Current NRL player at Sydney Roosters and NSW State of Origin representative
- Toby Rudolf – Current NRL player at Cronulla-Sutherland Sharks
- Billy Smith – Current NRL player at Sydney Roosters
- Siua Wong – Current NRL player at Sydney Roosters and Tonga representative

=== AFL ===
- Jack Buckley – Current AFL player at GWS Giants

=== Olympics and Commonwealth Games ===
- Andrew Ratcliffe – 1974 Commonwealth Games 4x100m Men's Relay Sprint (Gold Medal)
- Murray Stewart – 2012 Summer Olympics (Men's K-4 1000 metres) (Gold Medal)
- Thomas Whalan – four-time water polo Olympian (Sydney 2000, Athens 2004, Beijing 2008, and London 2012)

=== Horse Racing ===
- Hugh Bowman – Group One winning jockey; recipient of the Silver Saddle Award for most successful jockey (Royal Ascot)

=== Other sports ===
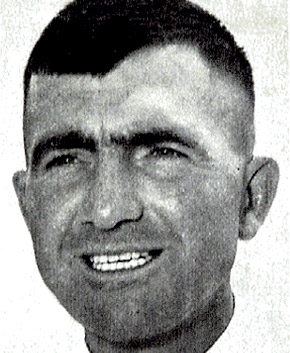
Forbes Carlile

- Forbes Carlile MBE, Australia's first post-World War II Olympics swimming coach; Australia's first competitor in the modern pentathlon (1956 Summer Olympics); only person to have coached and later competed at the Olympic Games
- Colin Scotts, former NFL Defensive End; played for the St. Louis Rams/Cardinals

== See also ==
- List of non-government schools in New South Wales
- List of boarding schools
- Athletic Association of the Great Public Schools of New South Wales

== Bibliography ==
- Howell, Max (2005) Born to Lead - Wallaby Test Captains, Celebrity Books, Auckland NZ
