= List of heritage houses in Sydney =

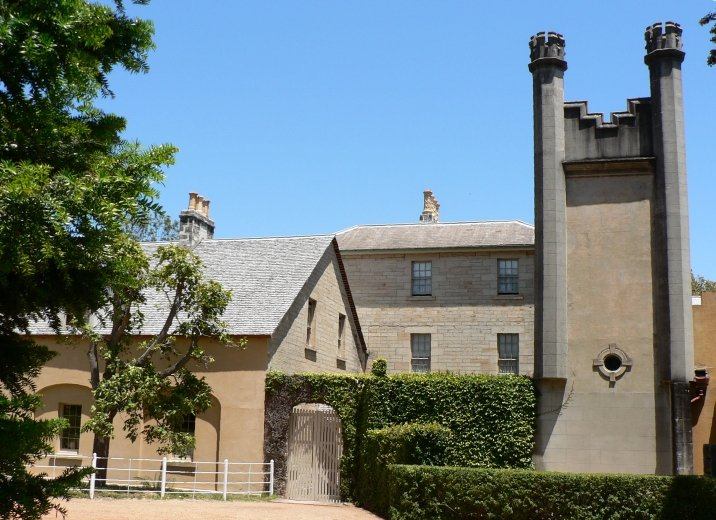
Vaucluse House

This is a list of heritage houses in Sydney, New South Wales, Australia. The following houses are listed on the Commonwealth Heritage List, the New South Wales State Heritage Register, various local government heritage registers, and/or the (now defunct) Register of the National Estate.

House	Built	Vicinity	Heritage register(s)				Notes
House	Built	Vicinity	CHL	NSW SHR	Local government	RNE (defunct register)	Notes
Elizabeth Farm	1790s	Parramatta		1			
Experiment Farm Cottage	1790s	Harris Park					
Old Government House	1790s	Parramatta					
The Dairy Cottage	1798	Parramatta					
Vaucluse House	1839	Vaucluse		955			
Cadmans Cottage	1810s	The Rocks					
Juniper Hall	1820s	Paddington					
Toxteth Park	1820s	Glebe					
Glover cottages	1820s	Millers Point					
Camden Park	1830s	Camden					
Elizabeth Bay House	1830s	Elizabeth Bay					
Government House	1830s	Sydney		1872		1866; 102246	
Lindesay	1830s	Darling Point					
Newington House	1830s	Silverwater					
Rose Bay Cottage	1830s	Rose Bay					
Admiralty House	1840s	Kirribilli	105399				
Darling House	1840s	Millers Point					
Carthona	1840s	Darling Point					
The Hermitage	1840s	Ryde					
Richmond Villa	1840s	Millers Point					
Willandra	1840s	Ryde					
Bronte House	1845	Bronte		55	Waverley	2467	
Emu Hall	1850s	Emu Plains					
Bishopscourt	1850s	Darling Point					
Fairfax House	1850s	Bellevue Hill					
Greycliffe House	1850s	Vaucluse					
Kirribilli House	1850s	Kirribilli					
Stead House	1850s	Marrickville					
Strickland House	1850s	Vaucluse					
Gladswood House	1860s	Double Bay					
Reussdale	1860s	Glebe					
Tresco	1860s	Elizabeth Bay					
Fernleigh Castle	1870s	Rose Bay					
The Swifts	1870s	Darling Point		146		2577	
The Hermitage	1870s	Vaucluse					
Ventnor	1870s	Randwick					
The Abbey	1880s	Annandale					
Cloncorrick	1880s	Darling Point					
Caerleon	1880s	Bellevue Hill					
Highroyd	1880s	Annandale					
Rona	1880s	Bellevue Hill					
St Helens Park House	1880s	St Helens Park					
Woollahra House	1880s	Point Piper					
Bellevue	1890s	Glebe					
Berith Park	c. 1909	Wahroonga			Ku-ring-gai		
The Crossways	1900s	Centennial Park					
Eryldene	1910s	Gordon					
Highbury	1910s	Centennial Park					
Boomerang	1920s	Elizabeth Bay					
Rovello	1930s	Bellevue Hill					
Rose Seidler House	1940s	Wahroonga					
Harry and Penelope Seidler House	1960s	Killara					
Woolley House	1960s	Mosman					

== See also ==
- Architecture of Sydney
- History of Sydney
