= Rovello, Bellevue Hill =

Rovello
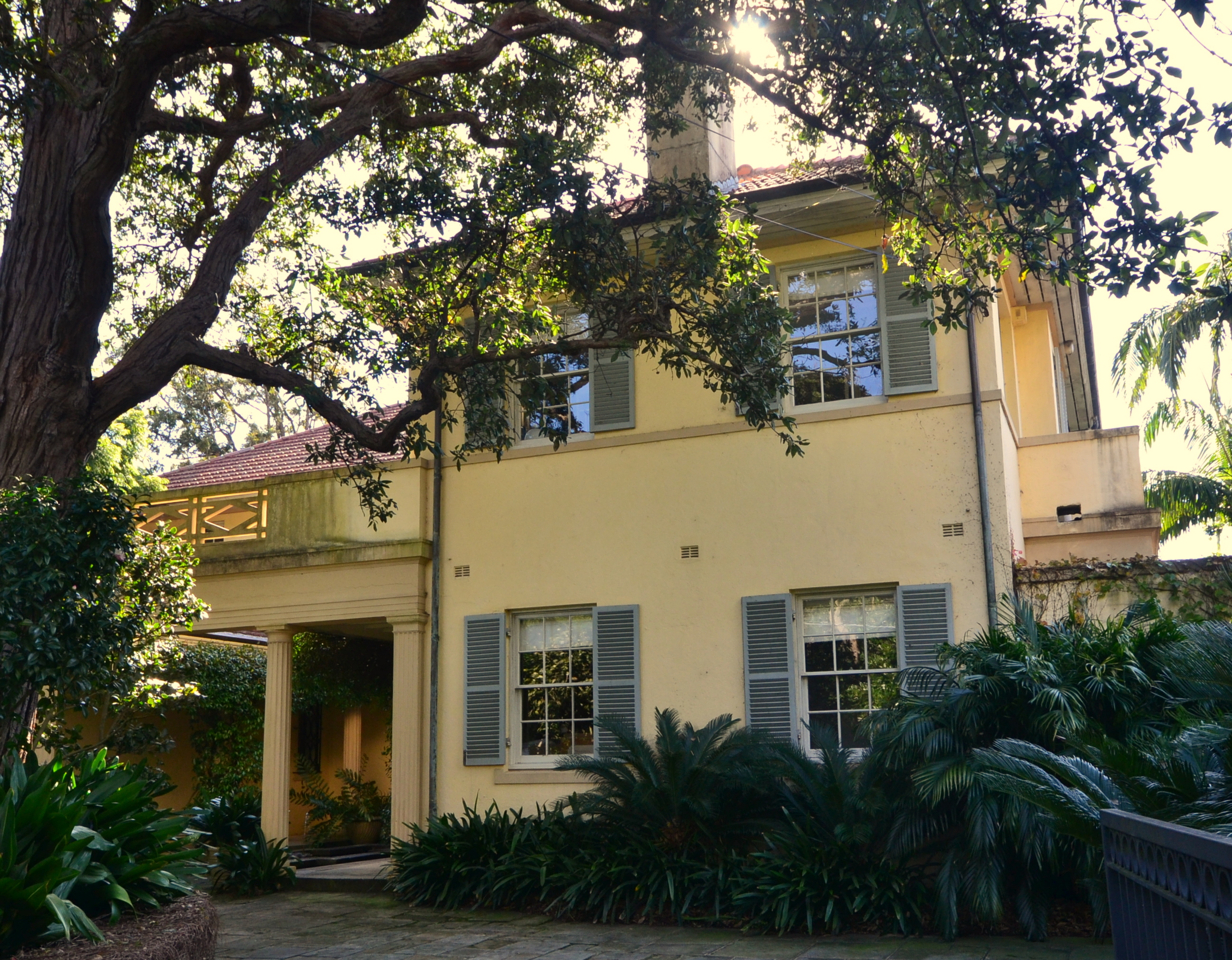
- Interactive map of the Rovello area

General information
- Status: Completed
- Type: House
- Location: 12 Ginahgulla Road, Bellevue Hill, Sydney, New South Wales, Australia
- Coordinates: 33°52′29″S 151°15′02″E
- Completed: 1936; 90 years ago

Design and construction
- Architecture firm: Wilson, Neave and Berry

Register of the National Estate
- Official name: House, 12 Ginahgulla Rd, Bellevue Hill, NSW, Australia
- Type: Defunct register
- Designated: 21 October 1980
- Reference no.: 2588

Rovello is a historic house in the Sydney suburb of Bellevue Hill, New South Wales, Australia. The house was listed on the now defunct Register of the National Estate on 21 October 1980.

== History and description ==
This two-storey house was designed by Wilson, Neave and Berry. Built in 1936, it is younger than other houses in the area, such as Rona, Ginahgulla, and Caerleon. It was designed around a courtyard modelled on the colonnaded Roman atriums. Features include a two-storey hall and a prominent set of timber stairs.

The Australian Heritage Commission describes Rovello as "Probably Wilson, Neave and Berry's finest extant piece of architecture. It is also an important element in Ginahgulla Road, grouping with No. 14 and with Rona, Ginahgulla and Trahlee to be an outstanding streetscape."
