= Leura, Bellevue Hill =

Leura
- Location within Sydney Location within Australia
- 33°52′25″S 151°15′03″E
- Location: 24 Victoria Road, Bellevue Hill, New South Wales, Australia

History
- Built: 1891
- Built for: Thomas Knox

Site notes
- Architects: Walter Liberty Vernon; Howard Joseland
- Architectural style: Federation Queen Anne

New South Wales Heritage Register
- Official name: Leura; Street House (Cranbrook School)
- Type: State heritage (built)
- Designated: 2 April 1999
- Reference no.: 47
- Type: Mansion
- Category: Residential buildings (private)

Leura is a heritage-listed former residence and school boarding house and now residence at 24 Victoria Road, Bellevue Hill, New South Wales, Australia. It was designed by Walter Liberty Vernon and Howard Joseland, and built during 1891. It is also known as Street House (Cranbrook School). It was added to the New South Wales State Heritage Register on 2 April 1999.

== History ==
The traditional owners of the land from South Head to Petersham were the Cadigal people. Following European occupation of Woollahra the Cadigal band disappeared from the area by about the middle of the 19th century.

=== Bellevue Hill ===
The name given to the suburb was taken from that given to the look-out area which later became Bellevue Park – named "Belle Vue" by Governor Macquarie as an alternative to the colloquial "Vinegar Hill" which Macquarie considered vulgar. The area was accessed by the Old South Head Road from 1811 and the New South Head Road from the 1830s. Victoria Road was formed by the Surveyor General, Sir Thomas Mitchell's survey of 1844.

=== Point Piper Estate ===
The subject properties were originally part of the extensive Point Piper Estate, land accumulated by Captain John Piper since 1816, later conveyed to the emancipist traders Cooper and Levey in 1826 following Piper experiencing financial difficulties. The estate, by then comprising 460 hectares (1,130 acres), became the property exclusively of Daniel Cooper in 1847. After 1850 Cooper began offering some sections of his estate for sale and others as 99 year leases.

Edwin Tooth took up a lease of over 16 hectares (40 acres) in Bellevue Hill in December 1854. Following Edwin's death, his brother Robert Tooth built the mansion Cranbrook on the southern side of New South Head Road in 1859–60. Cranbrook was eventually sold to the founders of Cranbrook School in 1917.

In c. 1880 Edward Knox and his brother-in-law William Gilchrist sub-leased an area of Edwin's land in Bellevue Hill, and by the turn of the century had purchased the freehold from the Cooper family. Edward built the house "Rona" on his part of the land in 1883. Edward Knox and William Gilchrist made available a portion of land adjacent to Rona for Edward's brother Thomas Forster Knox.

=== Leura ===
Site of an old Aboriginal camp and has a natural spring.

What became Leura was Lot 5 of the 1883 subdivision. Leura was built in 1891 for Thomas Forster (Tom) Knox, adjoining Rona. The tender for construction of the house dated 3 April 1890 is reprinted in "Cranbrook - the first fifty years 1918-1968" by A. C. Child, Cranbrook School, 1968, 159. It has been suggested in the Classification sheet of the National Trust of Australia (NSW), 1978 and the Woollahra Heritage Study 1984 that the architect for the house was "probably the same architect" as Rona, namely G. A. Morell. However a note on the tender reads "Addendum to contract by Mr. Vernon" - which suggests that the architect was in fact Walter Liberty Vernon. The house was completed in the following year, 1891, for Thomas Knox.

The date of construction predates the requirement of the 1906 Local Government Act (which came into force in 1909) that a building application including plans/drawings be lodged with the relevant Council. Thus no plans of the original building are held by Woollahra Municipal Council.

Thomas Knox and his family lived at Leura from 1891 until 1956 when Miss Helen Knox died and the house was sold.

=== Thomas Forster Knox (1849–1919) ===
Thomas Knox was managing director of the Sydney branch of Dalgety & Co from 1884 to 1912 when he resigned. He was the third son of Sir Edward Knox (1819–1901), founder of the Colonial Sugar Refining (CSR) in 1855 and builder of Fiona, at Darling Point, in 1864.

Thomas married Miss Ritchie, daughter of a well-known pastoralist of the western district of Victoria and had two sons (Captain Edward Knox RFA and Thomas Knox) and two daughters (Helen and Norah). Thomas Sr. trained in the Commercial Banking Company of Sydney (CBC) under Sir Thomas Dibbs (of Graythwaite, North Sydney), who had himself been taken into the bank in 1847 by Thomas's father Sir Edward Knox.

Thomas was a notable personality in Sydney commercial circles, having been involved in controlling or assisting control of a number of large commercial undertakings. He furthered the widespread interests of Dalgety & Co developing its pastoral and agricultural interests. On his resignation as managing director in 1912, the London directors of the company offered him chairmanship of the local board of advice, a role he took until his death. He was also chairman of directors of the Permanent Trustee Company and of the United Insurance Company, Australian Gas Light Company and Fresh Food and Ice Co. He owned an extensive rural property at Wyalong and a cattle station in the Burnett district of Queensland. He was keenly interested in the last Ernest Shackleton expedition to the South Pole and organised a fund to install wireless telegraphy instruments on Captain Macintosh's ship, the Aurora, and provided some scientific apparatus to the expedition. For some years he was president of the Warrigal Club and member of the Union Club. He was a member of the Australian Jockey Club, of which his younger brother Adrian Knox was chairman. Thomas also sat on the board of directors of the Carrington Hospital.

Edward Knox (1847–1933), industrialist was second son of Sir Edward Knox, founder of the CSR. Edward joined CSR in 1864 as a junior clerk, took charge of its crushing mills on the Clarence River in 1870 and was appointed general manager in 1880, expanding its operations into Queensland and Fiji, building seven new mills and a refinery in Auckland, New Zealand. He became chairman and managing director of CSR in 1920 and resigned in 1932. He served on four royal commissions including one into Sydney's water supply in 1902, served as an alderman on Woollahra Municipal Council from 1887 to 1902, the University of Sydney's Senate (1894–1919), Sydney Grammar School trustee (1884-1924) and National Art Gallery of New South Wales from 1907, among other involvements. His house Rona was completed in 1883. Edward's great pleasure was sailing: in 1875 he and his brother Tom bought and raced "Pleiades". In 1881 he had built "Sirocco" a ten-ton cutter, winning many races in this over 20 years.

A (an undated) photograph of the garden ('home of T. F. Knox, Esq.) showed rich plantings of trees, shrubs and ground covers, including (pointed out in its caption) a border of rock lilies (Dendrobium speciosissimum orchids) and azaleas (Rhododendron indicum cv.s) "typical of Bellevue Hill gardens".

A local sketch map from a 1902 Bellevue Hill Estate advertisement shows the mansions built on the Double Bay-Bellevue Hill leaseholds. It shows Leura but not a house on it – unlike "Rona" to one side and C. Stephen's property to the other. At that time Leura's land ran all the way downhill to Victoria Road.

The house was partially gutted by fire in January 1909 and the wooden shingle roof replaced by terracotta shingles. Helen Rutledge in her book My Grandfather's House remembered the fire which "completely gutted" the house. She notes that it had originally been roofed with oak shingles, but after the fire was re-roofed with brown Marseilles tiles.

Helen Rutledge gives a detailed account of the gardens and outlook at Leura in her book. She describes it as "extremely beautiful". G. Nesta Griffiths ('Some houses and people of New South Wales, 155) also noted that Leura was "so well-known for its beautiful garden". The house having been built on an outcrop of rock above the quarry "forward of Rona" afforded a "spectacular view". 'Mrs Knox capitalised on her unyielding terrain and made a brilliant and unusual rock garden. With its winding paths and exotic planting, it was a more famous garden than that of Rona, but most memorable were the massed rock lilies (in fact orchids, Dendrobium speciosum).

Unlike Rona, no lawns were attempted, except for a tennis court away from the house on a more or less level corner. The long S-shaped drive was handsomely planted and curved round a tropical jungle of palms, bananas, ginger and bird of paradise flower (Strelitzia sp.) which was watered by the spring that once was piped across the road to water the Cranbrook horse paddock. Giant bamboos were grown between the two houses (Rona and Leura) and enhanced the view without blocking it...Neighbourly gates were set at different levels for the use of the two families. When discussing the fire, Rutledge also refers to the rose bushes that grew "beside the house".

In March 1926 Woollahra Council approved a subdivision of Leura and separately an application for a "house and garage" on part of the Leura estate by the owner Edward Ritchie Knox. The architect was D. M. Mitchell. This property, Coonambula, became known as 22 Victoria Road.

As part of the "Knox Settlement" (referred to in the 1949 valuation lists of the NSW Dept. of the Valuer-General) the Leura estate was re-subdivided into six lots in 1949. Rona had been re-subdivided in 1948. A letter accompanying the June 1949 subdivision plan notes that under Thomas Knox's will the property "had to be divided among several beneficiaries in accordance with certain provisions..." and "in order to comply with these conditions...it has been necessary to prepare a subdivision."

The plan dated 1945 consisted of 8 lots but re-subdivision was rejected by Council due to the "objectionable shape of the allotments and unsatisfactory access to Lots 1 & 3". The plan shows the footprint of Leura (house), the garage and locations of several walls, tennis court and drive. A revised subdivision plan was drawn up by Surveyors Foxall and Lines in June 1949 and approved in September 1949, creating Lot 1 (16 Victoria Rd), Lot 2 (18 Victoria Rd.), Lot 3 (20 Victoria Rd., Lot 4 (22 Victoria Rd, Coonambula), Lot 5 (24 Victoria Rd. Leura: was described in 1952 and 1955 valuations as "house, attic, storeroom and garage" consisting of 1 acre 8.5 perches, with "access to Victoria Road by an existing driveway", Lot 6 24A Victoria Rd.

In 1956, the house (Lot 5/24 Victoria Rd.) was purchased at auction by Cranbrook School, after the death of Miss Helen Knox in February 1956. It served as "Street House" for sixty boarder boys, named after the then President of the School Council, Sir Kenneth Street.

Following the School Council's adoption of a proposal for development of the school by the architects Fowell, Mansfield, Jarvis and Maclauran in the early 1970s, Street House was sold c. 1979. After being sold by the school the property reverted to its original name, Leura. It appears to have been transferred to M. (& B.) Levy in c. 1979. It was sold again in c. 1985 and reported in The Eastern Herald that the new owners (who appear to be W. J. Shipton) had embarked on a substantial program of renovation'.

In 1986 it was sold by property developer Bill Shipton to Ken and Christine Allen. Woollahra Council development application records note a K. Allen in that year and in 1990.

Businessman Ken and his wife Christina Allen sold Leura prior to a proposed 10 November 2015 auction for over $30m, setting a new suburb record. The Allens held the property for over three decades and spent $7.3m on it in 1986. The Allens are now London-based.

Domain noted the new owners, Chinese businessman and keen super yachter, Wilson Lee and his wife Baoyu Wu have obtained the keys, and that the property sold for a Bellevue Hill auction high of $30.8m, the day before the auction. Lee is chief of China's wealth manager Noah Group, but better known locally for his super yacht, Ark 323, which made the trip out here from Shanghai Noah Sailing Club last year to become the first all-Chinese crew to compete in the Sydney to Hobart Yacht Race. Leura is barely visible from Victoria Road. A report of the sale included a photograph of the property.

== Description ==
=== Garden ===
The garden consists of over 4,260 square metres (45,900 sq ft) of established grounds, resort style sanctuary. It retains its splendid setting and panoramic views of Sydney Harbour; the curved drive passes below in front of the house. The site is an old Aboriginal camp and has a natural spring. Trees include a Hill's fig on the house's western side (Ficus microcarpa 'Hillii'). It has a commanding position to harbour and is important in the visual catchment from New South Head Road .

=== Mansion ===
Leura is a Federation Queen Anne style mansion (1891) adjoining "Rona" and probably by the same architect. Early Queen Anne style, leading to Federation style. Leadlight doors and window at rear. Timber panelling. Grand stair. Prominent siting to Sydney Harbour. Site of an old Aboriginal camp and has a natural spring. Knox family connection. Architect probably G. A. Morell as for Rona. Timber shingle roof destroyed by fire at turn of the century and replaced by terracotta shingles.

Substantial marine villa but in 1890, probably the last collaboration between (Walter Liberty) Vernon and (Howard) Joseland. Two storey brick house retains its splendid setting and panoramic views of Sydney harbour. The characteristic Shavian planning is evident in the arrangement of the principal rooms, which overlook the harbour, around the substantial stair hall. The small gable that marks the entrance and the main stair hall are Gothic Revival in character, employing restrained Gothic style tracery to the large window that lights the stairhall and to the front door. The stairhall has been altered; the ceiling and the upper rooms were unfortunately destroyed in a fire in 1909. A new roofline, with an additional gable was built. The generous two-storey verandah employs cast iron columns, providing the necessary strength for the added height.

A number of the original decorative details survive, such as the wave motif to the dado rail, the blue and white transfer tiles and the fern and sunburst detail to the grate in the dining room. The decorative motifs used are similar to the interior schemes designed by French-Australian artist Lucien Henry. Details such as panelled timber ceilings and soffits and the incised Japanese-style curves in the solid brackets to the first floro are details that appear in Vernon's later domestic designs, the former in his own house at Wendover and in the postal chamber of the Newtown Post Office and the latter in the staff residence in the grounds of Callan Park. Further evidence that the house is largely Vernon's work is a surviving (unpublished) tender analysis held by Woollahra Council. Completed by "Mr. Vernon", the list included prices from two of the builders engaged to build a number of the residences in the Neutral Bay Estate. It is likely that detailed supervision of the construction of Leura was undertaken by Joseland; the houe was not completed until 1891, by which time Vernon had been appointed Government Architect. Of Vernon's surviving work prior to this appointment, it is this design that marks the watershed between the London-influenced Queen Anne Revival and Shavian English Domestic Revival and the more restrained local variant of the style: the Federation style. It was the domestic-scale public buildings designed by Vernon and the Government Architect's Branch in the 1890s that helped to spread the Federation style across the state, however he had already been using a similar architectural vocabulary before his appointment to the position.

The billiard room on the house's south-west is a later addition.

=== Condition ===
As at 27 August 2015, very good.

=== Modifications and dates ===
- 1909: gutted by fire in January that year, the wooden shingle roof was replaced by terracotta shingles. Extensively rebuilt after the fire. The segmented roofline on the corner was replaced with a gabled roof, and windows added to the new and existing gable ends to create five attic rooms in the house (one a bathroom). The timber verandah railings were replaced by wrought iron railings and the chimney at the eastern end was shortened.
- 1956 purchased by Cranbrook School to serve as "Street House" for boarders.
- 1956 Fowell, Mansfield & Macluran (for Cranbrook School) alterations and additions (approved 17 December 1956)
- 1959 Fowell, Mansfield & Macluran (for Cranbrook School) toilet added (approved 12 January 1959)
- 1965 Denis Rourke architect/builder (for Cranbrook School) – fire stair added (approved 23 December 1965).
- c. 1985 R. Learoyd architect/builder (for B. Levy) – alterations and additions (approval date not recorded); CPA consultants (for B. Levy) (pool and tennis court (approved 8 April 1986).
- c. 1985 W. J. Shipton – mechanical vent, heating (approved 25 May 1986).
- c. 1987 Rodera P/L (for K. Allen) alterations and additions (approved 30 June 1989)
- c. 1990 K. Allen – fencing (approved 11 April 1991).

It has since returned to the private sector.

== Heritage listing ==
Leura was listed on the New South Wales State Heritage Register on 2 April 1999.

== See also ==
- Australian residential architectural styles
