= Gerald M. Lawrie =

Australian-born American surgeon

Gerald Murray Lawrie
- Born: 15 October 1945 (age 80); Murwillumbah, New South Wales, Australia
- Education: University of Sydney

Gerald Murray Lawrie (born 15 October 1945 in Murwillumbah, New South Wales, Australia) is an American heart surgeon and pioneer in the surgical treatment of valvular heart disease of Australian descent.

== Early life and education ==
Gerald Murray Lawrie was born in 1945 in Murwillumbah, New South Wales, a country town with a population of 15,000. He grew up in Sydney, attended The Scots College and graduated from the University of Sydney Medical School in 1969.

== Surgical training and career ==
He was a Commonwealth Scholarship holder throughout medical school and as an undergraduate was awarded the James McRae Yeates Prize for Clinical Surgery. He continued his surgical education in the teaching hospitals of the university of New South Wales, Australia between 1969 and 1972 when he left for a year of post-graduate education in the United Kingdom. This included five months at the Institute of Basic Medical Sciences of the Royal College of Surgeons in London. He returned to Australia in 1973 and completed his residency training in thoracic and cardiovascular surgery in Sydney at his previous teaching hospitals. During this period, Michael E. DeBakey was a visiting professor in Sydney and invited Lawrie to spend a year with him in Houston, United States.

Between 1974 and 1975, Lawrie completed a Cardiovascular Fellowship at Baylor College of Medicine with DeBakey and was invited to join his personal staff as an associate surgeon as well as the Department of Surgery at Baylor College of Medicine. In this capacity, he worked with DeBakey on a daily basis for over 20 years and accumulated a very extensive experience in the surgical management of end-stage and complex cardiovascular disease. During this time he participated in the surgical care of many notable figures such as the Shah of Iran, the President of Turkey, the King of Belgium, and a number of other royal figures. He helped set up cardiovascular surgery programs in Saudi Arabia and Indonesia. He was also actively involved in student and resident teaching and carried out extensive research in cardiovascular surgery.

In early 1994, he spent 3 months in Glasgow, Scotland, setting up a cardiac surgery program at a new 300 million dollar medical center for Health Care International. This entity was formed by Harvard Medical School-based physicians with major financial support from Harvard University. He then returned to Houston to continue his career at Baylor College of Medicine.

== Publications ==
- Lawrie GM (January 2008). "Ensuring proper leaflet apposition during mitral valve repair". J. Thorac. Cardiovasc. Surg. 135: 228, author reply 228–9. doi:10.1016/j.jtcvs.2007.07.068. PMID 18179958.
- Nagueh SF, Buergler JM, Quinones MA, Spencer WH, Lawrie GM (August 2007). "Outcome of surgical myectomy after unsuccessful alcohol septal ablation for the treatment of patients with hypertrophic obstructive cardiomyopathy". J. Am. Coll. Cardiol. 50: 795–8. doi:10.1016/j.jacc.2007.04.065. PMID 17707185.
- Lawrie GM (2006). "Mitral valve: toward complete repairability". Surg Technol Int. 15: 189–97. PMID 17029176.
- Lawrie GM, Earle EA, Earle NR (March 2006). "Feasibility and intermediate term outcome of repair of prolapsing anterior mitral leaflets with artificial chordal replacement in 152 patients". Ann. Thorac. Surg. 81: 849–56, discussion 856. doi:10.1016/j.athoracsur.2005.08.077. PMID 16488683.
- Talwalkar NG, Earle NR, Earle EA, Lawrie GM (September 2004). "Mitral valve repair in patients with low left ventricular ejection fractions: early and late results". Chest. 126 (3): 709–15. doi:10.1378/chest.126.3.709. PMID 15364746.
