= Lei Tomiki =

- Born: 22 July 1983 (age 43) Tongatapu, Tonga
- Height: 179 cm (5 ft 10 in)
- Weight: 101 kg (223 lb)
- School: Narrabeen Sports H.S. Scots College
- Notable relative(s): George Smith (cousin); Tyrone Smith (cousin)

Rugby union career
- Position: Flanker
Super Rugby
Years	Team	Apps	(Points)
2003–04	Waratahs	5	(0)
2010	Reds	1	(0)

Lei Tomiki (born 22 July 1983) is a Tongan-born Australian former rugby union player.

Raised in Sydney, Tomiki was educated at Narrabeen Sports High School and Scots College.

Tomiki, a flanker, represented Australia at the Under 21 World Championships and competed briefly with the New South Wales Waratahs in the Super 12, before embarking on a career in French professional rugby. He started with Top 14 club RC Narbonne and after they were relegated crossed to Castres Olympique. Returning to Australia in 2010, Tomiki was signed by the Queensland Reds for two seasons, though he only managed one Super 14 appearance due to injury. He ended 2011 back in France, with Stade Français, but his injury problems continued and the club signed his cousin George Smith as a "medical joker". In 2013, Tomiki made a return to RC Narbonne, where he would finish his career.
