= Stuart Pinkerton =

Australian rugby union player (born 1973)

- Full name: Stuart Ian Pinkerton
- Born: 25 March 1973 (age 53) Newcastle, NSW, Australia
- Height: 6 ft 3 in (191 cm)
- Weight: 232 lb (105 kg)

Rugby union career
- Position: Back-row
Senior career
Years	Team	Apps	(Points)
2001–04	Sale Sharks	56	(20)
Super Rugby
Years	Team	Apps	(Points)
1997–01	Waratahs	54	(30)

Stuart Ian Pinkerton (born 25 March 1973) is an Australian former professional rugby union player.

Born in Newcastle, Pinkerton is an old boy of Scots College and played his first-grade rugby with Randwick.

Pinkerton was a permanent fixture in the NSW Waratahs back-row between 1997 and 2001. He made over 50 appearances in the Super 12 and scored a try against the 2001 British Lions at the Sydney Football Stadium. An Australia "A" representative, Pinkerton left the country in 2001 to join the Sale Sharks and played in their 2002 European Challenge Cup final win over Pontypridd, progressing to club captain by the end of his spell.
