= Robert Somervaille =

Robert Duncan Somervaille AO (29 October 1921 – 14 April 2008) was an Australian lawyer and company director. He was born in Strathfield and was educated at The Scots College and Scotch College.

He served as the Chairman of the Australian Broadcasting Corporation. He was also Chairman of the Australian Telecommunications Commission and Overseas Telecommunications Commission, which later became known as Telstra. He was an inaugural director of Hill Samuel, now the Macquarie Group.

Somervaille was named a member of the Order of Australia in 1984 and became an Officer of the Order of Australia in 1992. He died on 14 April 2008, at the age of 86.
