= Ben Bryant (cricketer) =

English-born Australian cricketer (born 1994)

Personal information
- Full name: Benjamin Joshua Bryant
- Born: 15 December 1994 (age 31); Lambeth, London, England
- Batting: Right-handed
- Bowling: Right-arm off break

Domestic team information
- Years: Team
- 2015–2016: Cambridgeshire
- 2016: Cambridge MCCU

Career statistics
Competition	First-class
Matches	2
Runs scored	18
Batting average	4.50
100s/50s	–/–
Top score	10
Balls bowled	30
Wickets	0
Bowling average	–
5 wickets in innings	–
10 wickets in match	–
Best bowling	–
Catches/stumpings	3/–
- Source: Cricinfo, 19 July 2019

Benjamin Joshua Bryant (born 15 December 1994) is an English-born Australian former first-class cricketer.

Bryant was born at Lambeth in December 1994, emigrating to Australia with his parents when he was a child. He was educated in Sydney at Scots College, before attending the University of Sydney. In 2015–16, he took undertook an exchange year in England at Anglia Ruskin University. While studying at Anglia Ruskin, he made two appearances for Cambridge MCCU against Essex and Nottinghamshire in 2016. He also played minor counties cricket for Cambridgeshire in 2015 and 2016, making six appearances in the Minor Counties Championship, and a single appearance each in both the MCCA Knockout Trophy and the Minor Counties T20.
