= Colin Scotts =

Australian gridiron football player (born 1963)

No. 69
- Position: Defensive tackle

Personal information
- Born: 26 April 1963 (age 63); Sydney, New South Wales
- Listed height: 6 ft 5 in (1.96 m)
- Listed weight: 263 lb (119 kg)

Career information
- High school: The Scots College (Sydney)
- College: Hawaii
- NFL draft: 1987: 3rd round, 70th overall pick

Career history
- St. Louis Cardinals (1987–1988); Houston Oilers (1989)*
- * Offseason or practice squad member only

Career NFL statistics
- Sacks: 2.0
- Stats at Pro Football Reference

Colin Roberts Scotts (born 26 April 1963) is an Australian former professional American football defensive tackle. Scotts was the first Australian to receive an American football scholarship in the United States and be drafted into the National Football League (NFL). He became the second Australian to play in the NFL after Colin Ridgeway, an Australian rules football convert.

Growing up in Palm Beach, Sydney, Scotts first played rugby union for The Scots College and was a member of the Undefeated 1981 Australian Schoolboys Rugby team. During the tour Scotts scored 7 tries including two against England Schoolboys at Twickenham. He later moved to Hawaii, on a full football scholarship after being spotted by an assistant coach during a rugby game.

Pre-draft measurables
Height	Weight	Arm length	Hand span	40-yard dash	10-yard split	20-yard split	20-yard shuttle	Vertical jump	Broad jump
6 ft 5 1/2 in (1.97 m)	264 lb (120 kg)	33 3/4 in (0.86 m)	10 in (0.25 m)	4.89 s	1.67 s	2.83 s	4.41 s	27.0 in (0.69 m)	9 ft 3 in (2.82 m)
All values from NFL Combine

After being drafted in the third round of the 1987 NFL draft, he forged a career in the NFL where he played as a defensive tackle in twelve games during the 1987 season for the St. Louis Cardinals. In 1988 Scotts was traded to the Houston Oilers and played seven games during the 1988 season.

In 1993 Scotts began a professional wrestling career with the WWF. He retired in 1995 despite being offered a lucrative contract to continue.
