= Darby Lancaster =

Australian rugby union player (born 2003)

- Born: 23 April 2003 (age 23) Kempsey, New South Wales, Australia
- Height: 190 cm (6 ft 3 in)
- Weight: 95 kg (209 lb; 14 st 13 lb)
- School: The Scots College
- University: University of New South Wales

Rugby union career
- Position: Wing
- Current team: Blues, Hawke's Bay
Youth career
- Kempsey Cannonballs
Amateur team(s)
Years	Team	Apps	(Points)
2022	Eastern Suburbs	1	(5)
Senior career
Years	Team	Apps	(Points)
2024	Rebels	10	(20)
2025	Waratahs	8	(20)
2026	Western Force	5	(20)
2026–	Hawke's Bay	0	(0)
2027–	Blues	0	(0)
- Correct as of 15 April 2026
International career
Years	Team	Apps	(Points)
2022–2023	Australia U20	5	(15)
2024	Australia A	1	(0)
2024–	Australia	1	(0)
- Correct as of 1 November 2024
National sevens team
Years	Team		Comps
2022–2024	Australia		13
- Correct as of 1 November 2024

Darby Lancaster (born 23 April 2003) is an Australian rugby union player who currently plays for the Blues in the Super Rugby and the Australia national team. His primary playing position is wing.

== Early life and background ==
Darby Lancaster was born and raised in Kempsey on the mid-North Coast of New South Wales, Australia. He played junior rugby for the Kempsey Cannonballs Junior Rugby Club, a few years after Waratahs teammate Triston Reilly. He attended The Scots College in Sydney, and was a part of the teams 1st XV. While playing rugby at The Scots College, Lancaster tore his ACL and thought he'd never play rugby again. However, he received a contract to play for the Australia sevens team after school, and joined the team on the 2021–22 World Rugby Sevens Series.

Lancaster studied at the University of New South Wales (UNSW).

== Rugby career ==
=== Rebels ===
Lancaster's performances for the Australia sevens team earned him a contract for the Super Rugby side Melbourne Rebels, where he was named in the Rebels squad for the 2024 Super Rugby Pacific season. Before the start of the 2024 Super Rugby Pacific season, Lancaster was recalled to the Australian Sevens team for the Perth event in the 2023–24 circuit off the back of strong performances in 2023. Lancaster played nine matches for the Rebels in 2024, all as a first-team wing. He scored four tries overall, and achieved a hat-trick in their 47–31 victory against the Highlanders in Round 8 of the season.

=== Waratahs ===
Following 2024, the Melbourne Rebels team was axed from the Super Rugby, which saw a mass exodus of their players to other teams in the competition. Lancaster thus joined the New South Wales Waratahs in his home state for the 2025 Super Rugby Pacific season. Lancaster was the third confirmed former Rebels player signed by the Waratahs (after Andrew Kellaway and Taniela Tupou). Lancaster featured in the opening trial and earned eight appearances through to May, scoring 20 points (four tries). Despite mixed team results—including losses to the Hurricanes, Reds, Crusaders, and Blues, Lancaster remained a consistent selection on the wing. His performance peaked during the British & Irish Lions tour, where he scored a try and earned selection in the AUNZ Invitational XV, another career milestone.

=== Force ===
In late August 2025 it was confirmed that Lancaster had signed for Australian rival Super Rugby team, the Western Force for their 2026 season. Lancaster reportedly turned down an offer from English Premiership team Newcastle Red Bulls.

Lancaster was sidelined from the Force squad until the round three due to a short-term thigh issue. He was announced in the third round starting XV, where he made his Force debut against the Moana Pasifika at Pukekohe. Lancaster scored the opening try, assisted by teammate Ben Donaldson's cross-field kick, in what became a 35–19 victory, ending the side's nine-match winless run. The result secured their first win of the season and their first successful result on New Zealand soil in four years. Lancaster followed this up by scoring a double against the Hurricanes in Napier two rounds later, scoring three points towards his Player of the Year tally. In a round eight encounter against arch-rivals the Reds, Lancaster sustained a serious ankle injury after landing awkwardly while contesting a cross-field kick from teammate Ben Donaldson. Despite the injury, he retained possession and crossed for a try in the 50th minute. The Force won the match in Brisbane with a try-bonus point (their first since 2012), however Lancaster was subsequently sidelined for the remainder of the season.

=== Blues ===
In June 2026, Lancaster was revealed to have signed a multi-year deal with the Blues in Auckland, New Zealand. He told Nine.com.au that his decision to sign for the team was driven primarily by the opportunity to develop under incoming coach Jason Holland and play an attacking-focused style of rugby, rather than by ambitions on Wallabies selection or the Rugby World Cup (RWC). The author noted that at 23-years-old, Lancaster was one of the youngest Australian-capped players to head over to New Zealand, and stated that the move could be a "game-changer for the competition", adding: "Super Rugby officials believe relaxing the eligibility laws by opening the borders between Australia and New Zealand could help build interest in the competition."

Alongside joining the Blues, Lancaster joined Hawke's Bay in New Zealand's National Provincial Championship (NPC) on a two-year deal in July 2026. He was named in their senior squad ahead of the 2026 season.

== International career ==
He was named in the Australia U20 squad in 2023. Lancaster started on the right-wing in two of Australia's three matches in the 2022 Oceania Rugby Under 20 Championship. He scored one try. He was called up to the teams following World Rugby U20 Championship in 2023 where he made three appearances, scoring two tries overall from the left-wing.

Following his first professional season in rugby union (2024), Lancaster was called up to the Australia squad ahead for their July Test against Georgia at the Sydney Football Stadium. Lancaster started on the left-wing for Australia in a 40–29 victory. At the end of the year, Lancaster was called up to the Australia A squad where he played one game against England A.

== Career statistics ==
=== Club ===
As of 1 July 2026.

Appearances and tries by club, season and competition
Club	Season	League			
Club	Season	Division	Apps	Tries	Points
Rebels	2024	Super Rugby Pacific	9	4	20
Waratahs	2025	Super Rugby Pacific	9 (Note: Includes one match in the 2025 Lions tour)	5	25
Force	2026	Super Rugby Pacific	5	4	20
Hawke's Bay	2026	National Provincial Championship	TBD		
Blues	2027	Super Rugby Pacific	TBD		
Total			23	13	65

=== International ===
As of 1 July 2026.

Appearances and tries by national team and year
National team	Year			
National team	Year	Apps	Tries	Points
Australia A	2024	1	0	0
Australia	2025	1	0	0
Total		2	0	0

== Awards and honours ==
Eastern Suburbs

- Shute Shield: 2022
