= Bellevue Hill, New South Wales =

Bellevue Hill
- Suburb
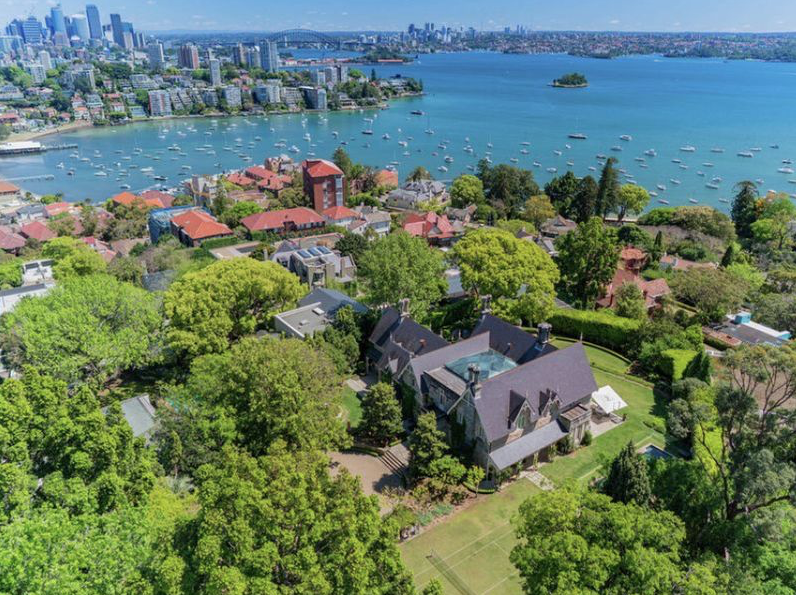
- Ginahgulla Road, Bellevue Hill

- Interactive map of Bellevue Hill
- Country: Australia
- State: New South Wales
- City: Sydney
- LGA: Municipality of Woollahra
- Location: 5 km (3.1 mi) east of Sydney CBD

Government
  - State electorate: Vaucluse
  - Federal division: Wentworth
- Elevation: 92 m (302 ft)

Population
  - Total: 10,590 (SAL 2021)
- Postcode: 2023
Suburbs around Bellevue Hill
Double Bay	Point Piper	Rose Bay
Edgecliff	Bellevue Hill	North Bondi
Woollahra	Bondi Junction	Bondi

Bellevue Hill is a harbourside suburb in the eastern suburbs of Sydney, in the state of New South Wales, Australia, located five kilometres east of the Sydney central business district, in the Municipality of Woollahra.

== History ==
The area of contemporary Bellevue Hill was originally part of the lands of the Cadigal people. Their livelihood was composed of fishing and shellfish collecting.

In the early 19th century, Irish-Australian immigrants referred to the area as Vinegar Hill, after the Battle of Vinegar Hill, an engagement during the 1798 uprising of the United Irishmen in south-east Ireland. Governor Lachlan Macquarie took great exception to this and decided to name the suburb Bellevue Hill, the belle vue meaning beautiful view.

The area became part of Daniel Cooper's estate, who passed most of it on his death in 1853 to his nephew, Sir Daniel Cooper. From the mid-19th century, land along the ridges was released, leading to the construction of the first houses, such as Ginahgulla, owned by the Fairfax family, and Cranbrook. The lack of public transport but preponderance of scenic views led to the area being aimed at those without the need for the former but with the appreciation for the latter.

Further land was released along the heights and the western side of the hill overlooking Double Bay in the early 20th century. The extension of the tram line began mass suburban development, with most housing ending up owner-occupied and built between 1910 and 1930, with later waves of redevelopment especially in the 1990s.

=== Former tram service ===
The line to Bellevue Hill opened in 1909. Services operated from Circular Quay via Elizabeth and Park streets. Trams heading south from Circular Quay down Elizabeth Street swung left into Park Street, via a right turn into Yurong Street, a left turn into Stanley Street, a right turn into Bourke Street, then a left turn into Burton Street.

A feature was the tram only viaduct over Barcom Avenue and Boundary Street in Darlinghurst as the line headed into MacDonald Street. This viaduct is now a road bridge. The line then twisted down Glenmore, Gurner and Hargreave Streets in Paddington, then Moncur and Queen Streets in Woollahra. Here, a connection to Oxford Street allowed access to the Waverley Bus Depot. The line then travelled down Edgecliff and Victoria Roads, then wound along Birriga Road in Bellevue Hill, finally running down Curlewis Street in Bondi to join the Bondi Beach via Bondi Junction line on Campbell Parade, to the North Bondi terminus. The line was double track throughout with numerous points to allow short working.

The line was cut back to Ocean Street, Woollahra in 1955; the remainder closed on 27 June 1959. The line followed approximately the current route of bus route 389 from the city.

== Demographics ==
According to the 2011 census of Population, there were 10,765 residents in Bellevue Hill. 56.3% of residents were born in Australia. The most common other countries of birth were England 5.1%, South Africa 4.7% and New Zealand 2.4%. 73.9% of residents spoke only English at home. Other languages spoken at home included Hebrew 1.3%, Cantonese 1.3% and Mandarin 1.1%. The most common responses for religious affiliation were Judaism 23.0%, No Religion 19.2% and Catholic 16.7%. The most common occupations for residents were Professionals 41.9%, Managers 20.7% and Clerical and Administrative Workers 12.8%.

In the 2016 census, 10,716 residents were counted. 58.2% of these had been born in Australia. The most common other countries of birth were England 5.8%, South Africa 4.9%, New Zealand 2.2%, China 1.6% and United States of America 1.2%. 74.8% of residents spoke only English at home. Other languages spoken at home included Hebrew 1.8%, Mandarin 1.7%, Russian 1.3%, Portuguese 1.2% and French 1.2%. The most common responses for religious affiliation were No Religion 28.1%, Judaism 21.4% and Catholic 16.8%. The most common occupations included Professionals 40.8%, Managers 22.3%, Clerical and Administrative Workers 11.4%, Sales Workers 7.9%, and Community and Personal Service Workers 7.2%. 4.2% of employed people in Bellevue Hill worked in Legal Services. Other major industries of employment included Other Auxiliary Finance and Investment Services 3.0%, Banking 2.9%, General Practice Medical Services 2.8% and Real Estate Services 2.6%.

At the 2021 census, there were 10,590 in Bellevue Hill.

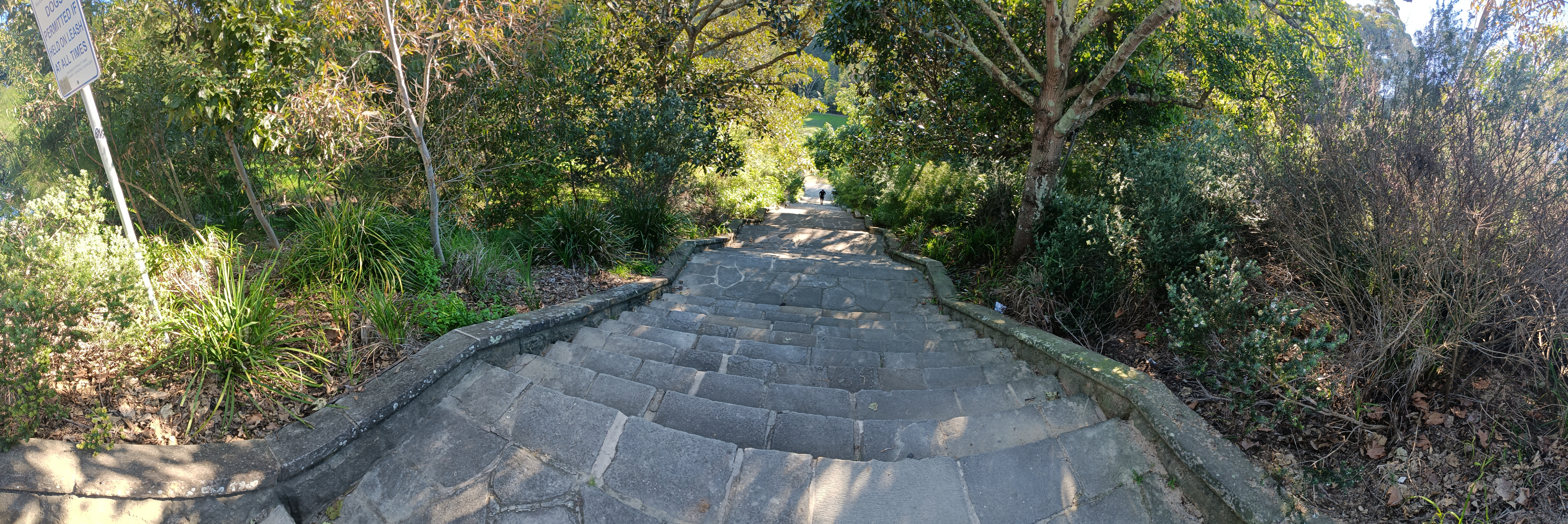
Moore steps, Cooper park, Bellevue Hill, Sydney. 2026

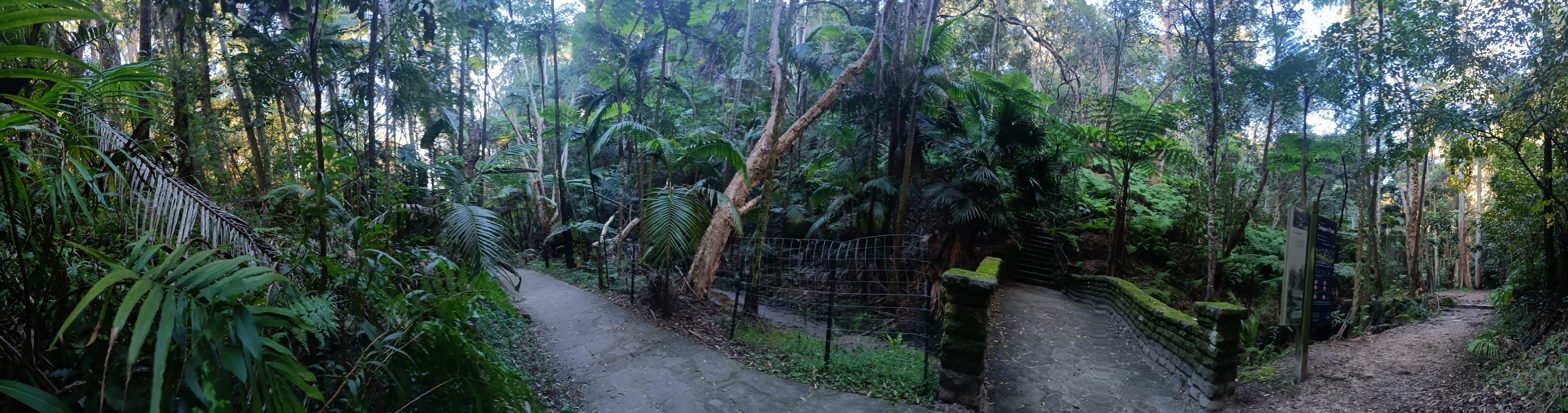
Moon bridge, Cooper park, Bellevue Hill, Sydney. 2026

== Real estate ==
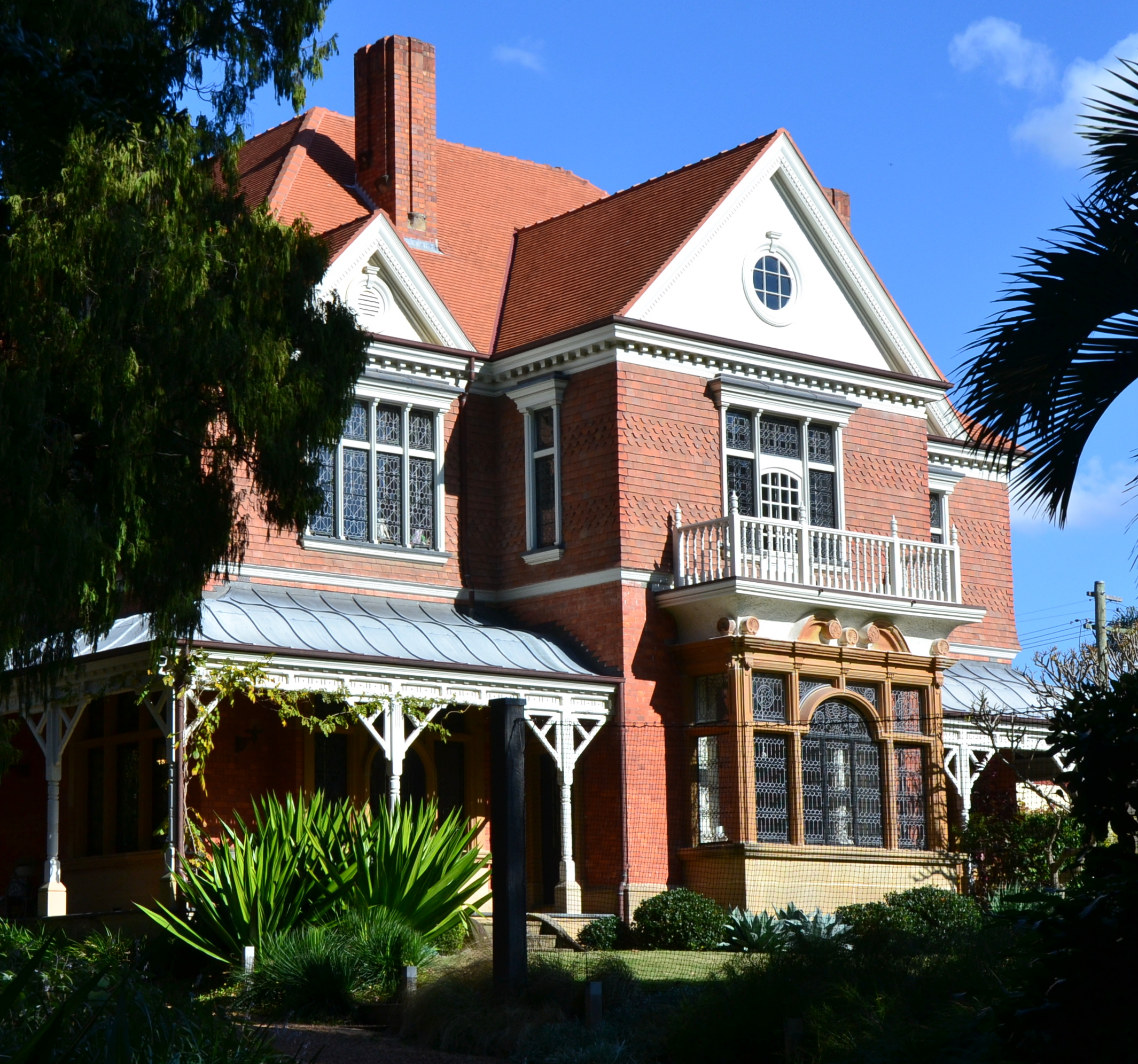
Caerleon (1885)

Bellevue Hill became the home of the Fairfax family, who lived at Trahlee, in Ginahgulla Road, which was leased by James Fairfax from 1866 to 1878. They then moved to Ginahgulla (now known as Fairfax House and owned by The Scots College) on the same road.

The historic Queen Anne home Caerleon was sold for $22 million in January 2008. This price was surpassed by the $23 million paid for a mansion in Victoria Road in November 2009. The mansion had previously been used by the French consulate since 1955. One person who inspected it was actor Russell Crowe, who subsequently did not take part in the bidding. The house was bought by Lachlan Murdoch.

Actress Toni Collette sold her Bellevue Hill home in August 2009 for $6.4 million. The house, El Mio, had been the base for Collette and her husband, musician David Galafassi, since they bought it in 2004 for $5 million. The house was located in Rupertswood Avenue and was designed in 1928 in the Spanish Mission style. It was initially passed in at $6.3 million, but was then sold within an hour after successful negotiations with the highest bidder.

== Heritage listings ==
Bellevue Hill has a number of heritage-listed sites, including:

- 24 Victoria Road: Leura (Bellevue Hill)

The following buildings are on the (now defunct) Register of the National Estate.

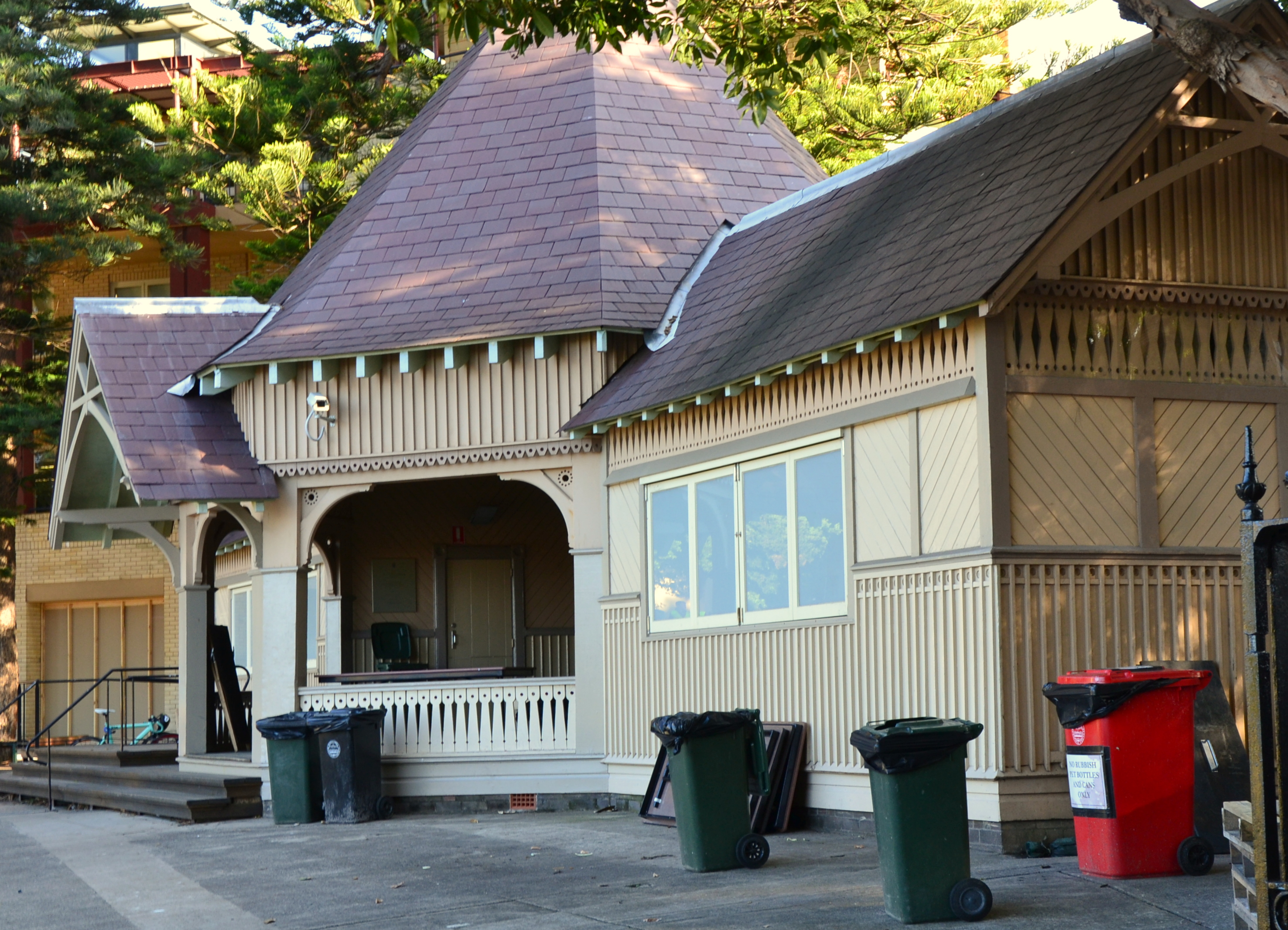
Cranbrook Sports Pavilion

- Rona, Ginahgulla Road
- Ginahgulla, Ginahgulla Road, now known as Fairfax House and part of the Scots College
- Rovello, Ginahgulla Road
- Caerleon, Ginahgulla Road (first Queen Anne home in Australia)
- House and Gardens, 1 Rose Bay Avenue
- Former Government House, now part of Cranbrook School, Victoria Road
- Sports Pavilion, Cranbrook School, New South Head Road (designed by John Horbury Hunt)
- Trahlee, Ginahgulla Road, is listed on the Heritage Register of New South Wales
- Villa d'Este, Victoria Road, is listed on the Heritage Register of New South Wales
- Bonnington, Victoria Road, is listed on the Heritage Register of New South Wales
- Wirian, Victoria Road, former home of Martin Sharp, is listed on the State Heritage Register of New South Wales

== Schools ==
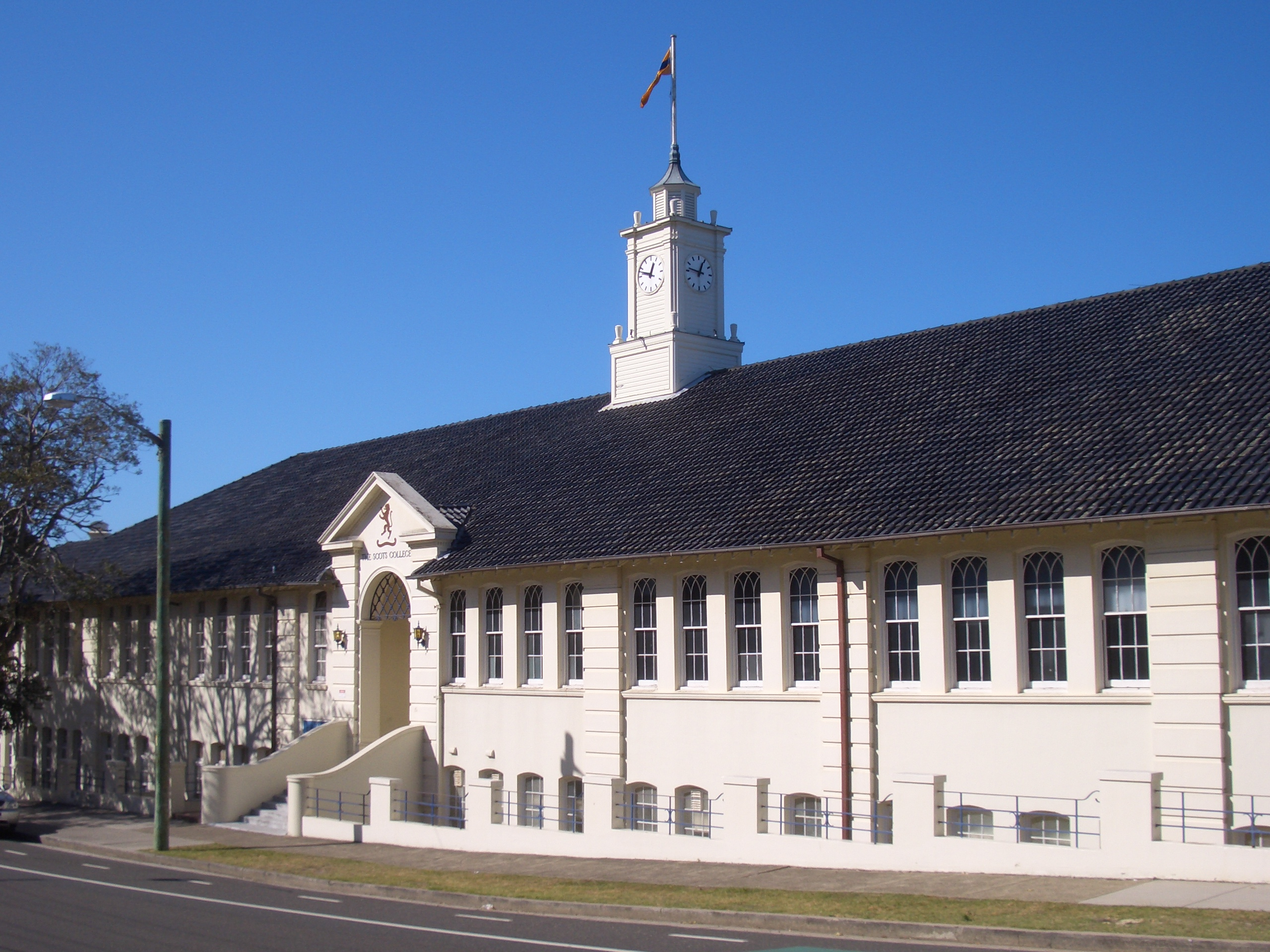
Scots College, Victoria Road

Bellevue Hill has several schools, including Bellevue Hill Public School and private schools The Scots College and Cranbrook School.

== Notable residents ==
- Gubby Allen, former England test cricketer. Born in Bellevue Hill.
- Charles Blackburn, a former chancellor of the University of Sydney. Died at his home in Bellevue Hill.
- May Brahe composer, spent her last years here and in Onslow Gardens, Potts Point
- Edmund Capon, the former director of the Art Gallery of New South Wales, lived in Bellevue Hill.
- Gordian Fulde, director of emergency medicine at St Vincent's Hospital.
- Helen Garner, writer, lived in Bellevue Hill in the late 1990s.
- Tony Hancock, comedian. Found dead after an overdose in his flat.
- Rene Rivkin, the stockbroker, lived at Carrara, 5 Rose Bay Avenue, Bellevue Hill. He later moved to Point Piper.
- Alan Kippax, the former Australian Test cricketer and captain of New South Wales. Lived in Bellevue Hill for many years, and died at his home in 1972.
- Sir William McMahon and Lady McMahon, Prime Minister of Australia and wife lived in Drumalbyn Road and Victoria Road respectively.
- Chad Morrison, former Australian rules footballer
- James Packer, son of Kerry Packer and a businessman who was Australia's richest man from 2006 to 2008.
- Kerry Packer, father of James Packer and a businessman who was Australia's richest man at the time of his death in December 2005, lived at Cairnton on Victoria Road.
- Martin Sharp, artist, lived in Wirian in Victoria Road, Bellevue Hill, from 1978 until his death in 2013
- David Wilson KC, lived at Yandooya, Cranbrook Road, from 1919 until 1943. This house was built in 1912 to a design by the architectural firm of Manson and Pickering and had extensive grounds running between Cranbrook Road and Cranbrook Lane. The Scots College bought the property in 1943 and it became a boarding facility, Royle House, but was demolished in 1981.

== Gallery ==
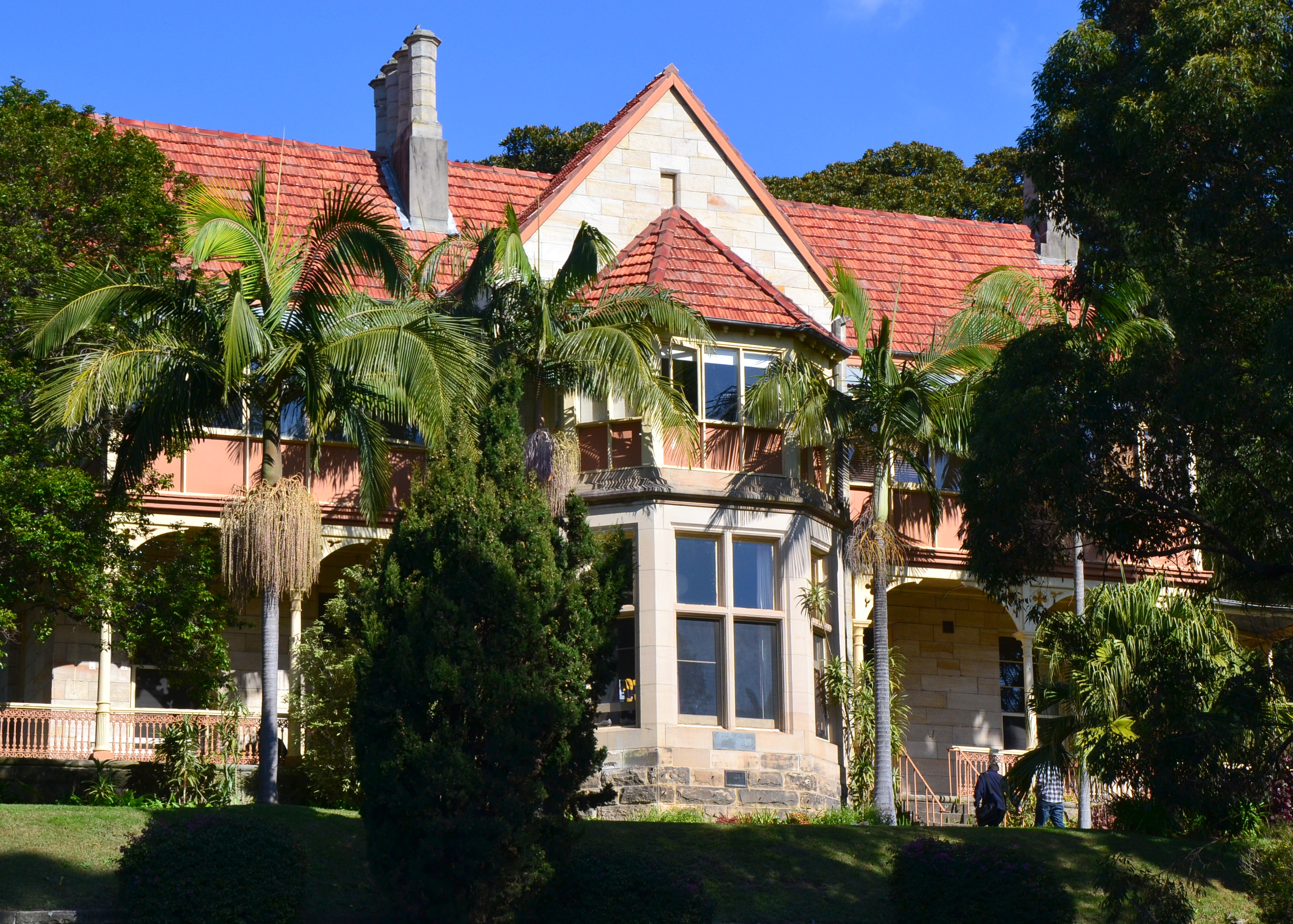
Fairfax House

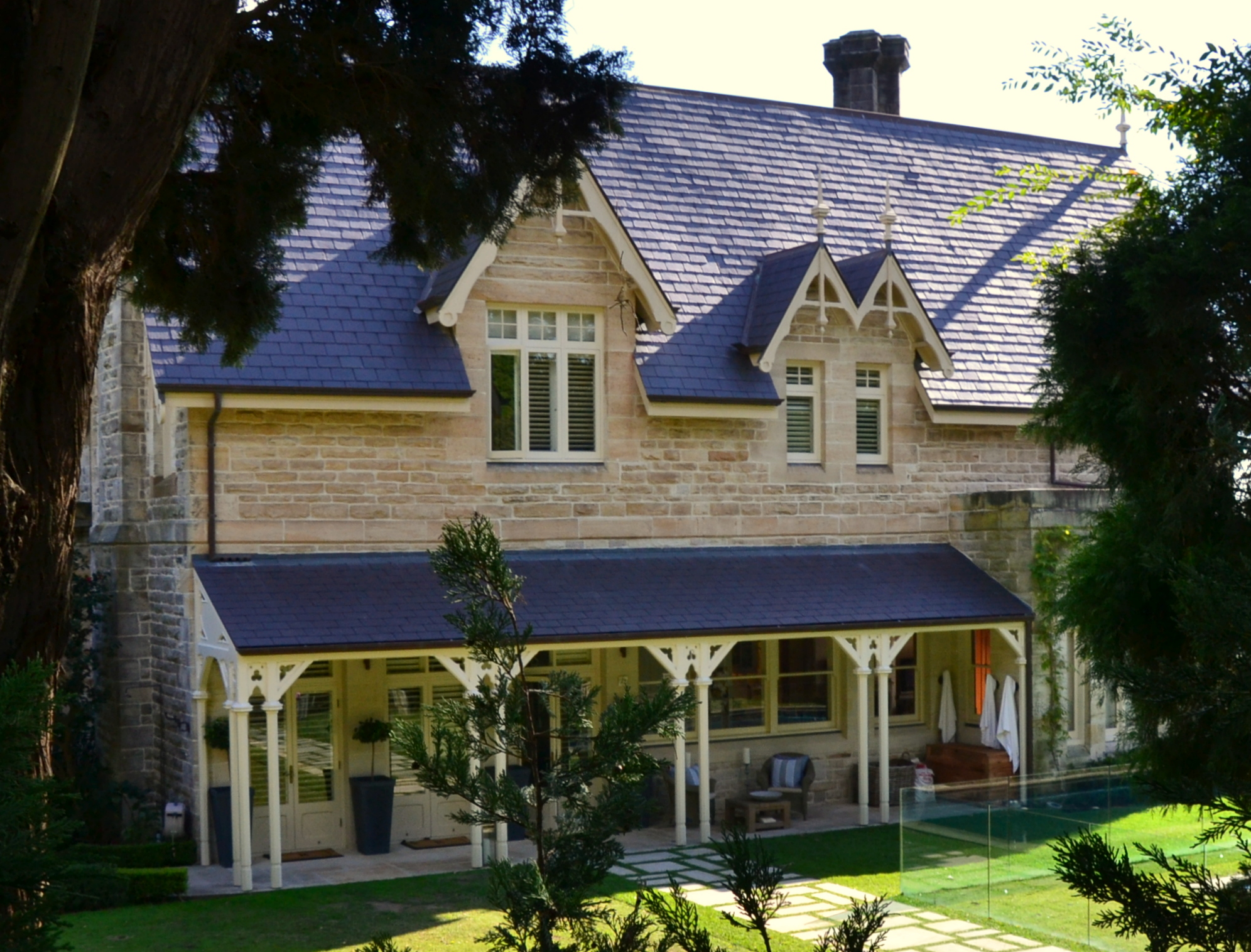
Rona

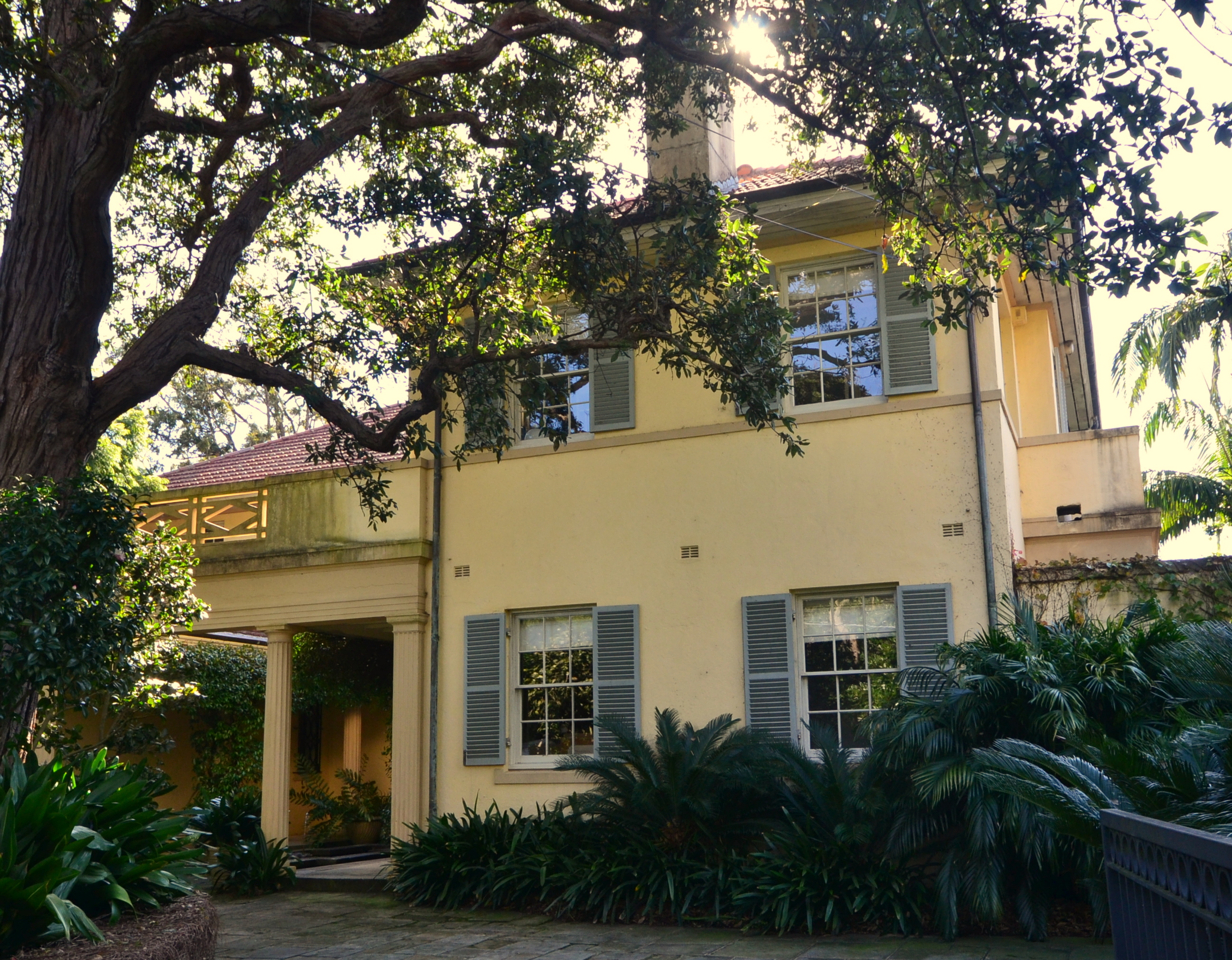
Rovello

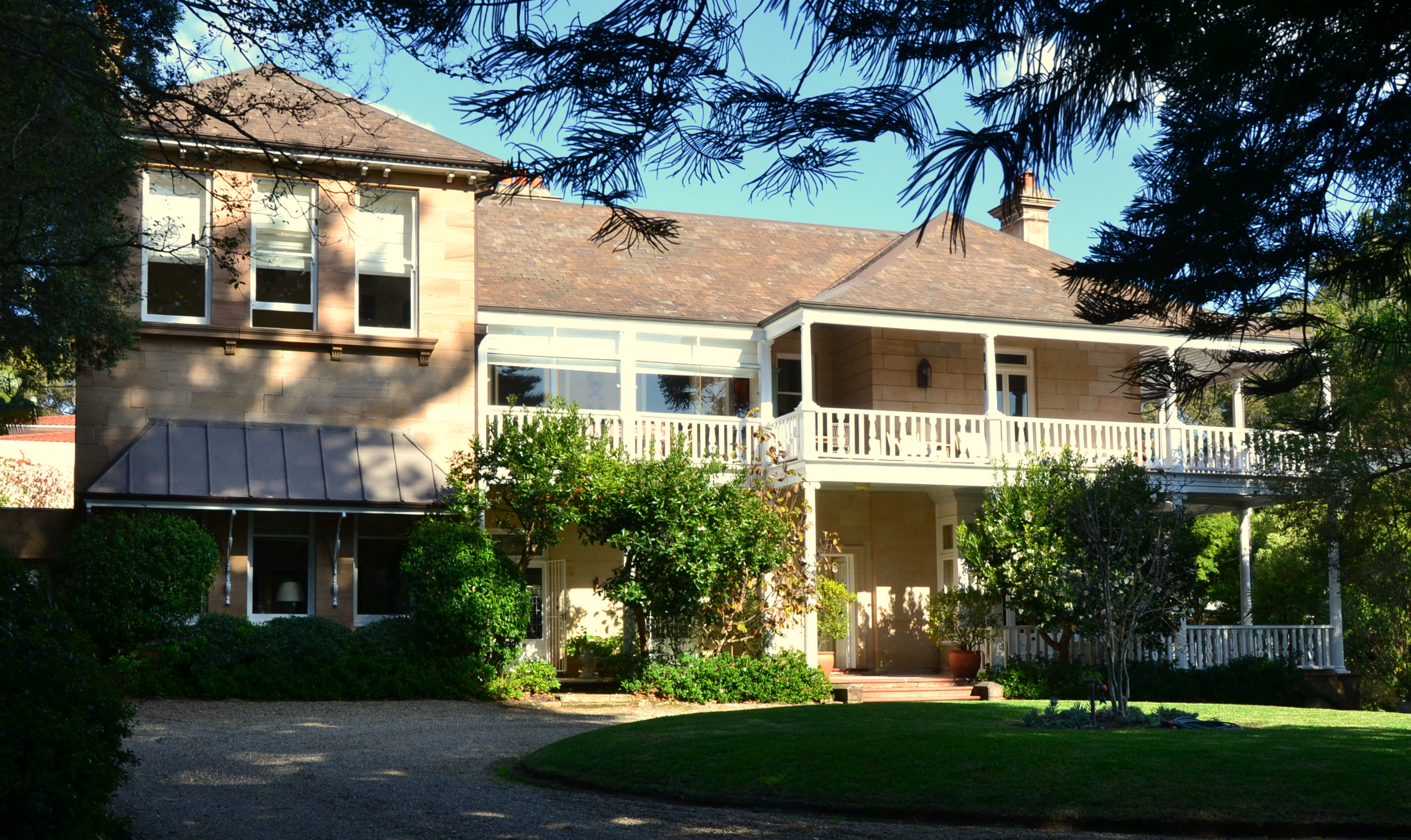
Trahlee

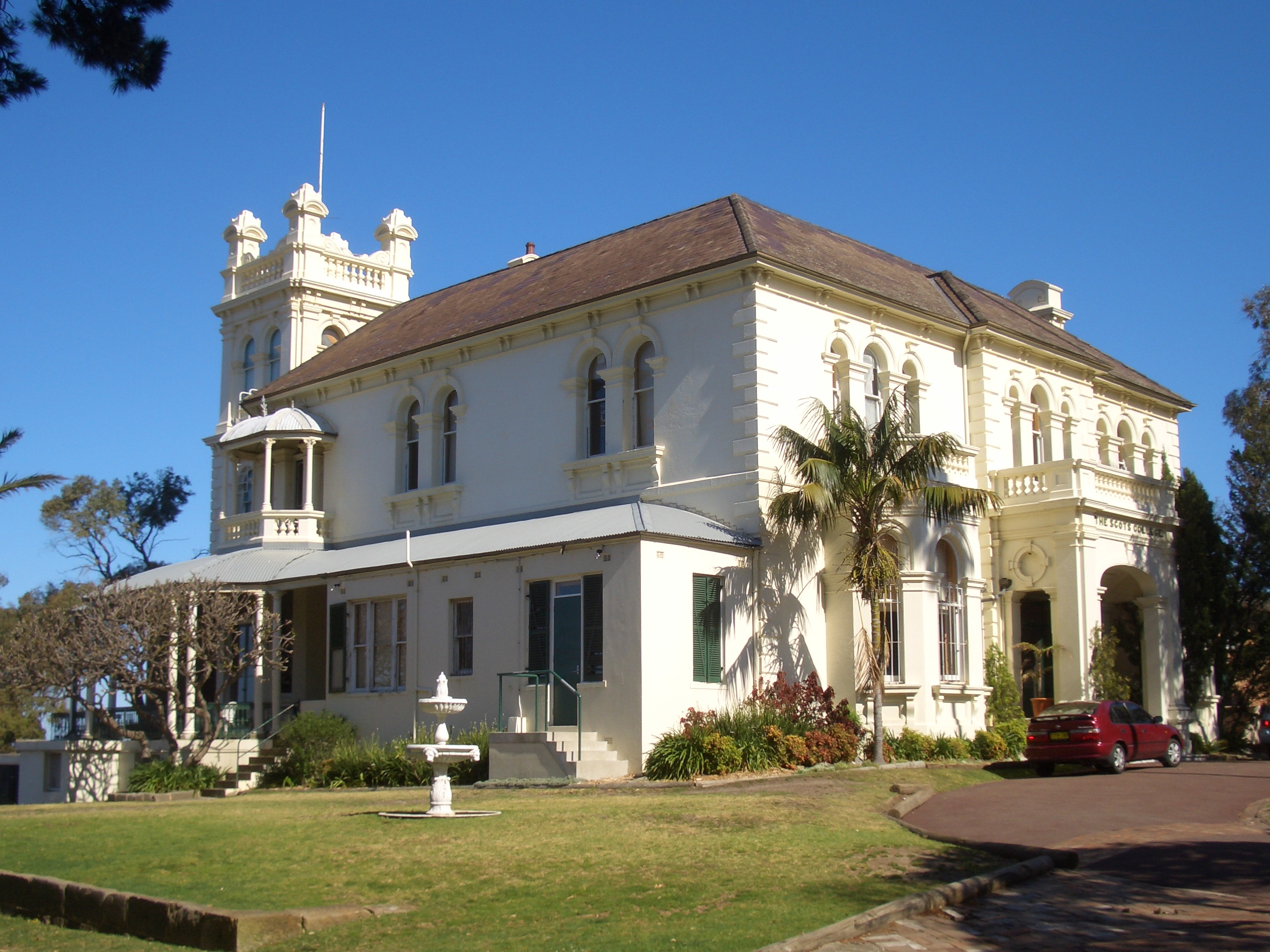
Aspinall House, Scots College, Victoria Road
