= Tom Parry (economist) =

Australian economist and public servant

Tom Parry AM
- Born: Thomas Gregory Parry
- Education: University of Sydney; London School of Economics
- Occupations: Economist; public servant
- Known for: Foundation Chairman Independent Pricing and Regulatory Tribunal of New South Wales (1992-2004)
- Board member of: First State Super Trustee Corporation (Chairman); Sydney Water (Chairman); Australian Energy Market Operator (Chairman); ASX-Compliance (Director); Powerco NZ (Director); Children's Medical Research Institute (Director); Sydney Opera House Trust (Director)

Thomas Gregory Parry AM is an Australian economist and public servant from Sydney.

Parry served as foundation chairman of the Independent Pricing and Regulatory Tribunal of New South Wales (IPART) for the 12 years to 2004.

== Career ==
Parry was Foundation NSW Natural Resources Commissioner, an Associate Commissioner of the Australian Competition & Consumer Commission, a Director of South East Sydney Area Health Board, a Director of the Children's Medical Research Institute, a Director of the NSW Clinical Excellence Commission, and a member of the NSW Council on the Cost and Quality of Government. He has been an adjunct professor at the University of New South Wales and a former Dean of the Faculty of Commerce at the University of Wollongong.

In 2002 and 2003, he conducted a Ministerial inquiry into sustainable public transport in New South Wales. The inquiry's final report informs a significant amount of transport policy in New South Wales, including the corporatisation of Sydney Ferries, the reform of CountryLink, and reforms to the fare structure.

After leaving Independent Pricing and Regulatory Tribunal in 2004, Parry joined Macquarie Bank to join a new Community Partnerships Funds Management business. He moved to the Investment Banking Group in Macquarie in 2005 where he was Principal Adviser, Regulatory involved with Macquarie Group interests globally in regulated utilities and infrastructure. He retired from Macquarie Group at the end of 2009.

Parry served as chairman of First State Super, Chairman of the Australian Energy Market Operator (AEMO). He was a director of Australian Stock Exchange Compliance Ltd, Powerco, New Zealand, Brisbane Airport Corporation, Icon Water, ActewAGL and a member of the Sydney Opera House Trust.

== Honours ==
On 26 January 2006, Parry was appointed a Member of the Order of Australia for "service to public administration in New South Wales, particularly through the provision of advice to government on a range of economic regulatory, business promotion and industry issues."

Government offices
Preceded by Gabrielle Kibble	Chairman of Sydney Water; 2007 – 2013	Succeeded by Bruce Morgan
