= Caerleon, Bellevue Hill =

Coordinates: 33.8755°S 151.2507°E

Caerleon
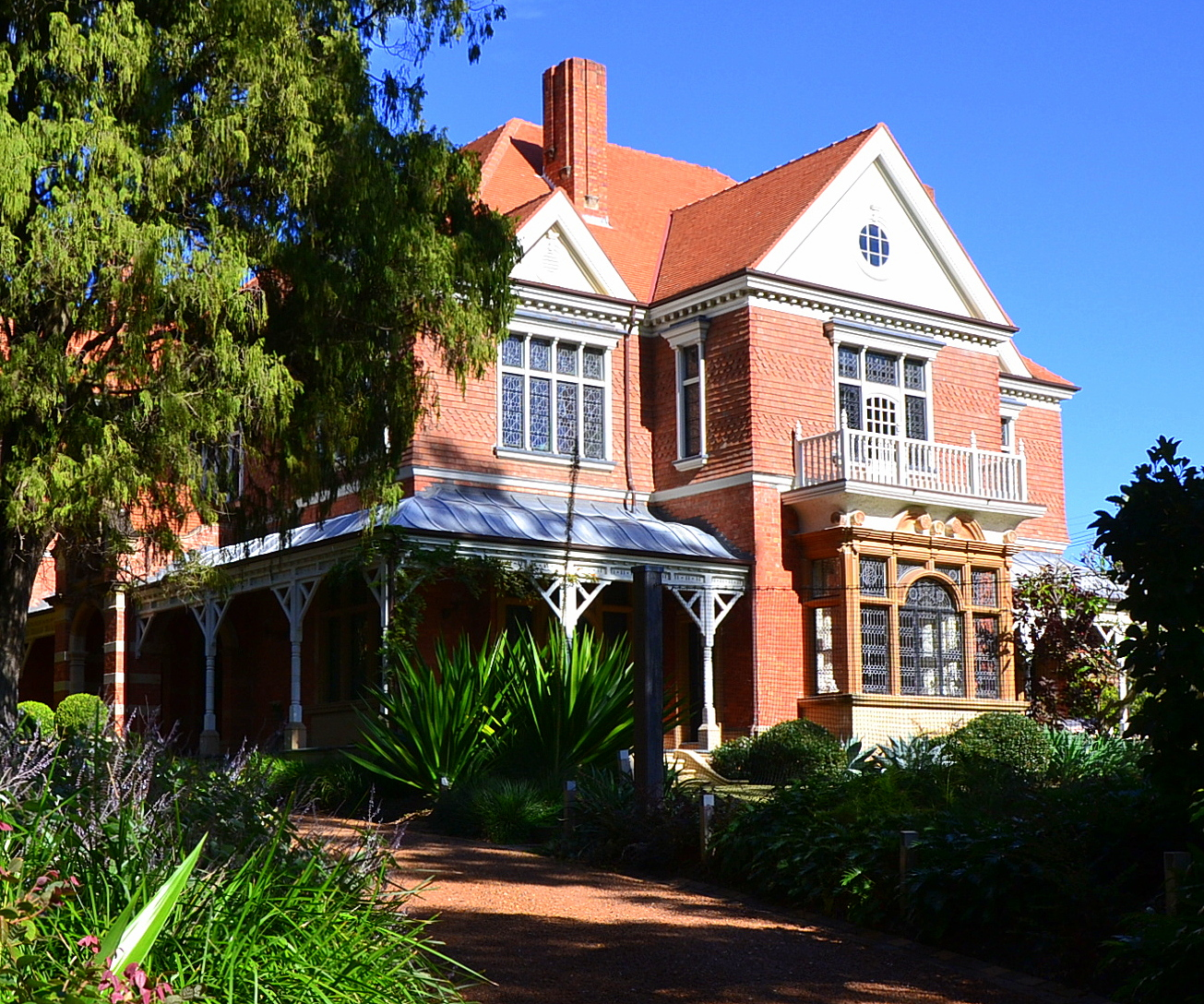

General information
- Type: House
- Architectural style: Queen Anne
- Location: Bellevue Hill, Sydney, New South Wales, Australia
- Construction started: 1885

Caerleon (/kərˈliːən/; Welsh: Caerllion) is a historic house in the Sydney suburb of Bellevue Hill. It is listed on the Register of the National Estate as well as having a New South Wales heritage listing. It was named after Caerleon, a small town in Wales.

== History and description ==
Caerleon is a two-storey Queen Anne home built in 1885. Original plans for the house were drawn up by Sydney architect Harry Kent, but they were reworked extensively by Maurice Adams in London, England. Controversy followed when Kent found that his name was left out altogether when the plans were exhibited in London. Kent nevertheless supervised the construction of the house, which was designed for Charles Burton Fairfax, grandson of newspaper founder John Fairfax.

The house represents a rich example of Queen Anne elements: red brick walls with stone dressing, terracota shingles, balconies, bay windows, verandas, leadlight windows and elaborate chimneys. It is said to have been the first Queen Anne home in Australia and set the tone for the Federation Queen Anne homes that were to become so popular. It was sold for $22 million in January 2008.

Five trees on the estate, each estimated as over 100 years old, are listed as protected by Woollahra Council.

== Gallery ==
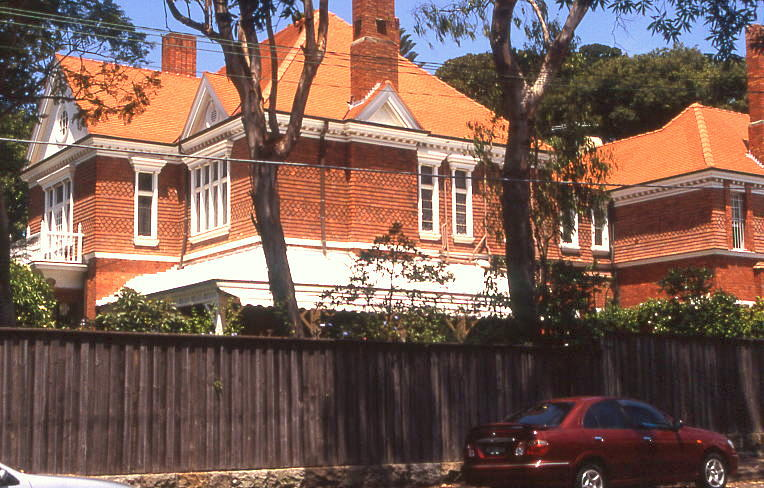
Side view of house

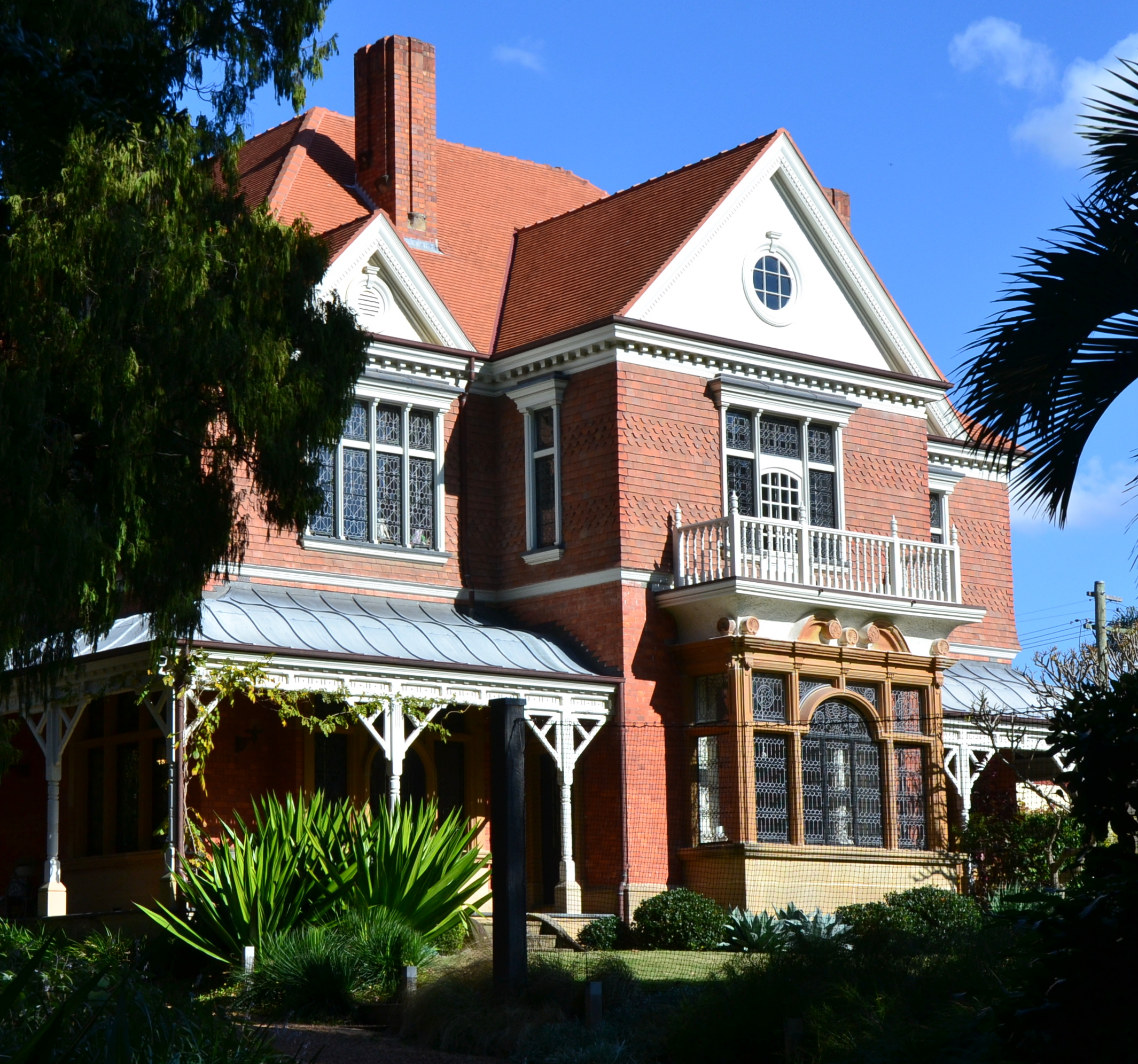
Exterior

== See also ==
- Architecture of Australia
- Architecture of Sydney
- Federation architecture
