= Ginahgulla =

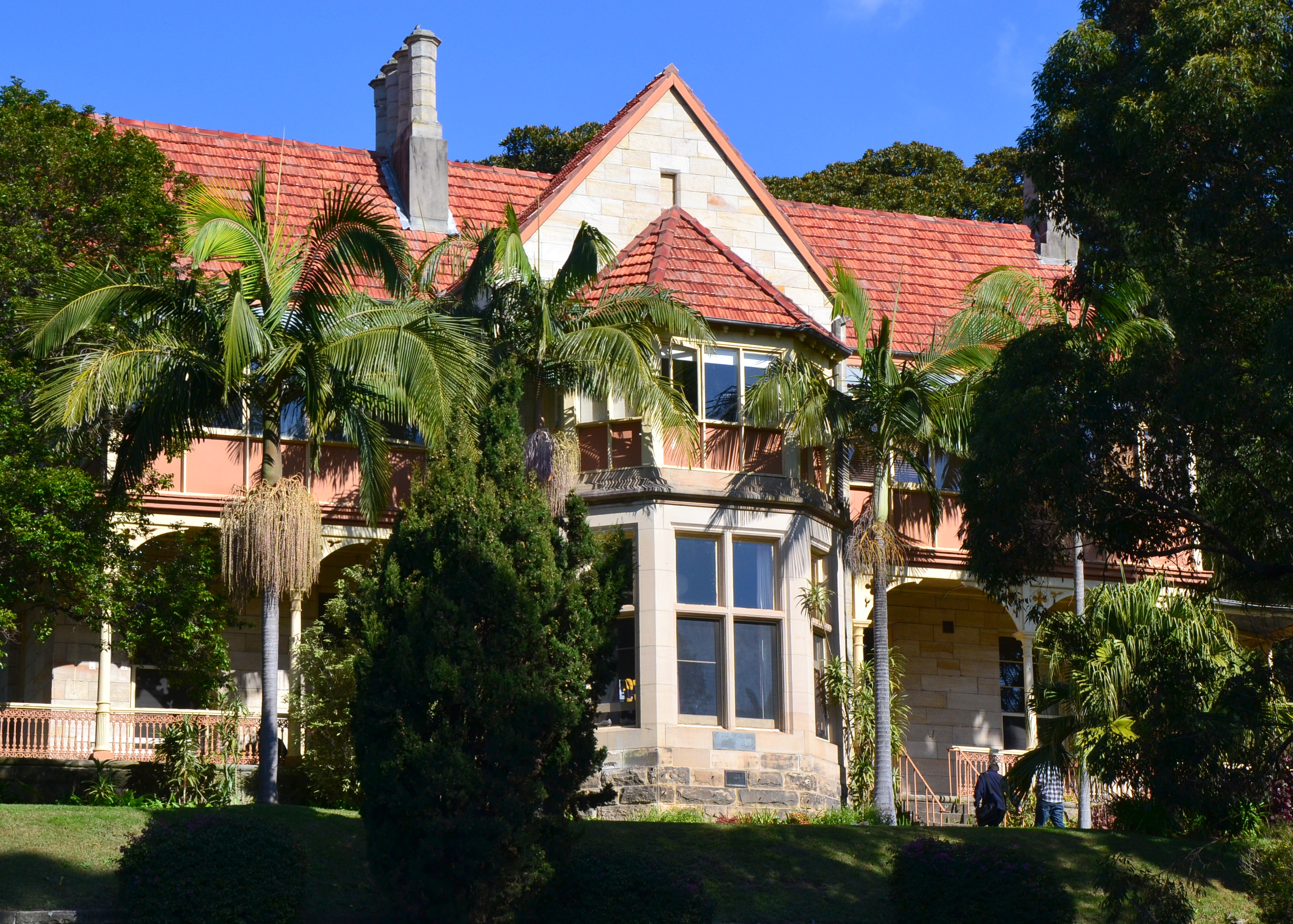
- Ginahgulla, Bellevue Hill

- Location within east Sydney
- Alternative names: Fairfax House

General information
- Status: Completed
- Type: House
- Architectural style: Victorian Free Gothic
- Location: 17–25 Ginahgulla Road, Bellevue Hill, New South Wales, Australia
- Coordinates: 33°52′32″S 151°15′05″E
- Completed: 1858
- Client: John Fairfax
- Owner: The Scots College

Technical details
- Material: Brick and Sydney sandstone

Design and construction
- Architect: Edmund Blacket (attrib.)

Register of the National Estate
- Official name: Ginahgulla
- Type: Heritage
- Designated: 21 October 1980
- Reference no.: 2578

New South Wales Heritage Database (Local Government Register)
- Official name: Fairfax House part of Scots College
- Type: Landscape
- Designated: 10 March 1995
- Reference no.: Local register
- Group/Collection: Parks, Gardens and Trees
- Category: Tree groups - copse

Ginahgulla, also known as Fairfax House, is a historic house in the Sydney suburb of Bellevue Hill, New South Wales, Australia. Completed in 1858 in the Victorian Free Gothic style, Ginahgulla and its gardens are listed on the (now defunct) Australian Register of the National Estate and the Municipality of Woollahra local government heritage list.

== History ==
This two-storey Gothic house is situated on the south side of Ginahgulla Road. It was built in 1858 by John Fairfax, of the Fairfax family of newspaper proprietors. It may have been designed by Edmund Blacket, who was otherwise distinguished as an ecclesiastical architect, responsible for many churches in the Sydney area. The Fairfax family used the house until 1945, when it was bought by the nearby independent school, The Scots College. The College uses the house as a boarding house and is sometimes known as "the house on the hill."
