= Scots College (Sydney) =

The Scots College

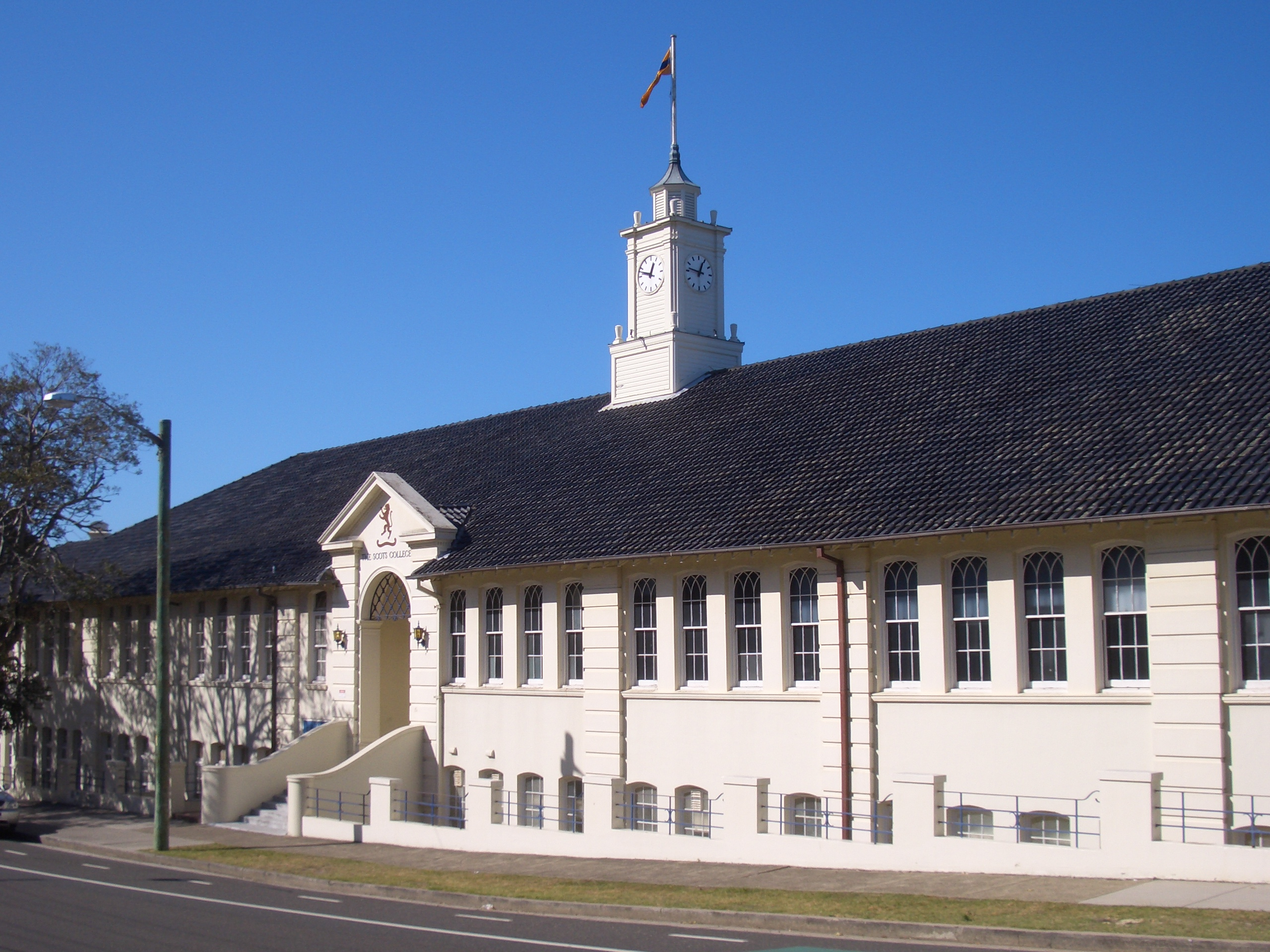
- The Scots College, as viewed from Victoria Road, Bellevue Hill

Location
- Bellevue Hill, Eastern Suburbs, Sydney; Australia; 33°52′30″S 151°15′11″E

Information
- Motto: Latin: Utinam Patribus Nostris Digni Simus (O that we may be worthy of our forefathers)
- Denomination: Presbyterianism
- Established: 1893; 133 years ago
- Chairman: Rev Glen Pather
- Principal: Dr Ian Lambert
- Chaplain: Rev Conrad Nixon
- Employees: c. 300
- Years: K–12
- Gender: Male
- Enrolment: c. 1,800 (2007)
- Campuses: Bellevue Hill; Brighton-Le-Sands; Kangaroo Valley; Shoalhaven River
- Colours: Gold and blue
- Nickname: Scots
- Alumni: Scots College Old Boys
- Website: www.scots.college

The Scots College is an independent primary and secondary day and boarding school for boys, predominantly located in Bellevue Hill, an eastern suburb of Sydney, New South Wales, Australia. It is affiliated with the Presbyterian Church of Australia.

Established in 1893 at Brighton-Le-Sands, Scots has a non-selective enrolment policy and currently caters for approximately 1,800 students aged from three to eighteen, including 250 boarders.

The college is affiliated with the Association of Heads of Independent Schools of Australia, the Junior School Heads Association of Australia, the Australian Boarding Schools' Association, the Headmasters' and Headmistresses' Conference, and is a founding member of the Athletic Association of the Great Public Schools of New South Wales.

== History ==
The college was formed in 1893 by three men, Archibald Gilchrist, William "Fighting Mac" Dill-Macky, and Arthur Aspinall. Gilchrist devised the school motto of "Utinam Patribus Nostris Digni Simus", which may be translated from Latin as "O that we may be worthy of our forefathers".

Arthur Aspinall, who became the first principal, was minister of Forbes parish from 1874 to 1887. An educated man himself, with a love of learning, he saw the need to educate the sons of the pastoralists of the area. The Presbyterian Church was not happy with the proposal to start the school. Aspinall became the guarantor, advancing the capital required, while the possibility of starting the school was still a matter of bitter contention within the Church hierarchy. Thus Scots opened as a private enterprise. Once the school was established and functioning, the Church Assembly saw no reason to continue to oppose the idea of the school. In 1906 Aspinall sold the college to the Church for 7,000 pounds and so it became part of the Presbyterian education system in New South Wales.

=== Original campus at Lady Robinson Beach ===
The college was originally established at Lady Robinson Beach, now renamed Brighton-Le-Sands, near the shores of Botany Bay. The initial school building was the modified, de-licensed New Brighton Hotel on The Grand Parade, near Bay Street. The renovations to the hotel were done by Arthur Aspinall's brother, Albert Aspinall. The first Principal, the Rev Arthur Aspinall, remained in this position until his retirement in 1913. The school was officially opened 28 January 1893 by the Governor of New South Wales, the Right Honourable Victor Albert George, Earl of Jersey. Villiers Street, Rockdale was named in honour of this occasion. There were ten-day students and 25 Boarders.

The period when the school opened was during a time of depression. The first few years for the school were difficult. There were 55 boys enrolled at the school when, in 1895, (soon after a racecourse had opened nearby) the school moved to its current location in Bellevue Hill.

=== Early days at Bellevue Hill ===
The school occupied St Killians, the former home of Judge Josephson. Before he retired, Aspinall had added new buildings to the school and developed playing fields.

=== 1914 to 1955 ===
James Bee, a New Zealander, continued the growth and expansion of the college. When he retired in 1934 there were 450 enrolled students. Alexander Knox Anderson, also a New Zealander, saw the Depression end only to be followed four years later by World War II. During World War II, Scots and its student body relocated to a purpose-built campus at Bathurst, to the west of the Great Dividing Range. This was due to the proximity of the Bellevue Hill campus to the coast, and the fear of Japanese naval bombardment, a fear justified in May 1942 with the Japanese mini-sub attack on Sydney Harbour.

The Bathurst campus remained part of the school for a short period after the war, before splintering off and becoming the independent The Scots School, Bathurst.

=== 1955 to 2015 ===
In 1975, a fire gutted the school's Assembly Hall, resulting in a major reconstruction and renovation of school facilities. The fire was deemed to be caused by an "electrical fault" but the word at the time was that it was caused by students playing with fireworks on the stage. A small rocket was set off and got stuck high up in the curtain, setting fire to it. The fire spread rapidly over the curtain and up into the roof. There were no injuries.

In 1988, the school opened its outdoor education campus, "Glengarry", in the Kangaroo Valley. Attending Glengarry is compulsory for all Year 9 boys, who live on site in one of five dormitories for six months. The year group is split into two intakes, they attend in terms 1 and 2, and terms 3 and 4 respectively. The Glengarry adventure now finishes with a 'Long Journey Home', which involves the intake to ride, hike and canoe their way back to Sydney from Glengarry.

Most of the Council members are elected by the General Assembly of the Presbyterian Church of Australia in New South Wales.

=== Recent history ===
In August 2017, the school was forced to cancel the HSC Trial Physics exam when two CSSA papers were stolen by unknown persons.

In March 2018, the college celebrated its 125th anniversary and opened a new campus, Brighton Preparatory School at Dolls Point, near its original site at Brighton-Le-Sands.

A faux castle, completed in the Scottish baronial revival style and estimated to have cost $60 million, was opened as a student centre at the Bellevue Hill campus in 2025, in a ceremony with military pageantry, highland dancing and fireworks. The foundation stone for the structure was laid in 2023 by Prince Edward. The construction was opposed by some local residents and attracted media coverage because of its opulence.

=== 2026 sexual assault allegations ===
On 13 August 2026, three boys enrolled at the school, aged 13 and 14, were charged with the aggravated sexual assault of a 14-year-old girl in Bondi Junction on 22 July 2026. Weapons and stolen property were retrieved from some of the accused boys' homes. Following the August 2026 allegations, the college said that it was co-operating with police. The school's principal, Ian Lambert, denied accusations that some of the accused boys had been "shielded" from consequences because of their parents' donations to the school.

The charges prompted media scruitiny of the school's culture, including allegations of a "toxic" approach to consent and gender relations and calls for Lambert's resignation. Following the arrests, it was reported that the school had not responded to previous attempts to raise concerns about its culture. The media also published messages from a WhatsApp group for old boys of the college, including comments downplaying the seriousness of the offences. An old boy from the class of 1995, Arthur Tzaneros, resigned from his role as managing director of ACFS Port Logistics following publication of his WhatsApp comments.

== Staff ==
=== Principals ===
The following individuals have served as Principal of The Scots College:

| Ordinal | Officeholder | Term start | Term end | Time in office | Notes |
|---|---|---|---|---|---|
| 1 | The Rev. Arthur Aspinall | 1893 | 1916 | 22–23 years | |
| 2 | James Bee | 1917 | 1930 | 12–13 years | |
| 3 | Alexander Anderson | 1931 | 1955 | 23–24 years | |
| 4 | Allen McLucas | 1956 | 1965 | 8–9 years | |
| 5 | Guthrie Wilson | 1966 | 1980 | 13–14 years | |
| 6 | Graeme Renney | 1981 | 1993 | 11–12 years | |
| 7 | Dr Robert Iles | 1994 | 2006 | 11–12 years | |
| 8 | Dr Ian PM Lambert | 2007 | 2027 | 20 years | |

=== Other notable staff ===
- Brian Smith, former international rugby union player, worked as Head of Sport at the school.

== Facilities ==
The Scots College has five campuses: Bellevue Hill, Mansion Road, Brighton (Brighton Le Sands), Glengarry (Kangaroo Valley), Bannockburn (Shoalhaven River), Rose Bay (Carslie St)

The Scots College campuses and buildings
| Name | Years used | Usual Classes held |
|---|---|---|
| Main building | 1899, 1977 | Design and Technology, Visual Art, Film and television, Digital Media, Photography, History, Geography. |
| John Cunningham Student Center | 2025 | None, Used primarily as a student and staff centre. |
| Graeme Clark Centre for Innovation in the Sciences (Science Building) | 2008 | Sciences, Sport Sciences, Sport Acceleration, Mathematics |
| Centenary Centre | 1992 | Christian Studies, Music |
| Lang Walker Business Centre (Business Centre) | 2017 | Commerce, Economics, Business Studies, Legal Studies |
| Anderson Building (Anderson Hall) | Unknown | Year 11/12 study space, Chapel |
| Ginaghulla Campus | 1982, 2009 | Languages, English, Year 5 Classrooms, Year 6 Classrooms |
| Mansion Road Campus | 1928, 2009 | Year 2 Classrooms, Year 3 Classrooms, Year 4 Classrooms |
| Horsham House/ELC | 1954, 2009 | Transition Classrooms, Kindergarten classrooms, Year 1 Classrooms |
| Brighton Campus | 2018 | Transition Classrooms, Kindergarten Classrooms, Year 1 Classrooms, Year 2 Classrooms, Year 3 Classrooms, Year 4 Classrooms, Year 5 Classrooms, Year 6 Classrooms |
| Glengarry (Year 9 Only) | 1987 | Outdoor Education, All Mandatory Subjects for year 9, Leadership |
| Bannockburn | 2018 | Outdoor Education, Geography, Agricultural, |

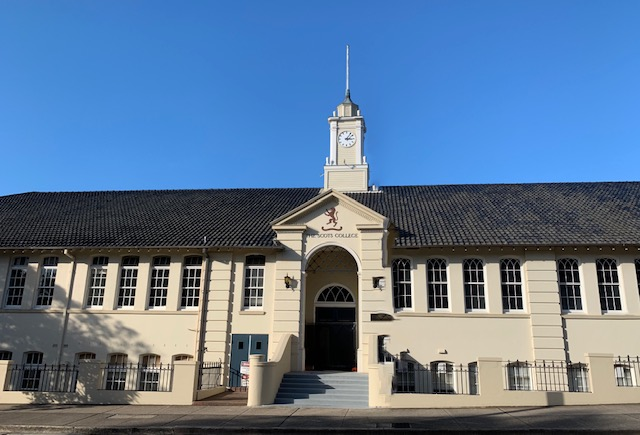
The Main building seen from Victoria Road

The Main Building houses the Auditorium and main school administration, main building also contains the Harry Triguboff Auditorium (Opened 2021) and college uniform shop.

The John Cunningham Student Centre (Opened 2025) houses the Zylstra Library, the Black Watch Café, a range of staff offices and the Hyder Theatre.

The Centenary Centre contains the school's primary Lecture room, the Coote Theatre and various music facilities and musical instruments.

The college quadrangle finished reconstruction in 2007 to provide additional change rooms and wheelchair accessible facilities such as an elevator for the Main Building, as well as vastly improving the aesthetics of the college 'quad'.

A new Mathematics/Science building named the Graeme Clark Centre, as well as aerobics room (Bottom Level – the same level as the current pool and weights room) was constructed from early 2007 to late 2008. Classes began on Monday 17 November 2008 and the building was opened on Friday 27 March 2009.

In 2007 the new 'Ginahgulla' classrooms were completed. These classrooms house years five and six located at the Senior campus, Victoria Rd. The upper floors were renovated in 2008 and became new Languages and English classrooms. The college Pipes and Drums Band Room is also located on the Ginahgulla Campus.

The Lang Walker Business Centre (Opened 2018) is used primarily for Business Economics lessons and functions hosted by the college. The college archives and Old Boys function room are both located in the Business Centre.

The Glengarry campus (Opened 1987) is used for outdoor education by year 9 students only. The year is divided into 2 intakes which are sent for 6 months each. The boys experience rights of passage during their time at “Gaz”, by boarding in 5 dorms of up to 20 boys; Alpha Dorm (Green), Bravo Dorm (Yellow), Charlie Dorm (Blue), Delta Dorm (Red), Echo Dorm (Purple) and Foxtrot Dorm (Black) – Intake 1 only. On their return, boys do a 6-day hike from Kangaroo Valley to Bellevue Hill, called “The Long Journey Home.”

The college was able to fund an altitude training chamber in the high-performance centre. Such a device is able to alter the levels of oxygen present during sport training sessions and PD lessons. While providing benefit to the college's leading athletes, the benefit of such equipment for the institution as a whole has been publicly questioned.

== Pipes and drums ==
As a testament to its Scottish heritage, the school has a pipe band: The Scots College Pipes and Drums, established in 1900.

== Notable alumni ==
Old Boys' Union Logo

Former students of The Scots College are known as Old Boys, or alternatively Old Scotsmen, and may elect to join the school's alumni association, The Scots College Old Boys' Union (OBU). The OBU was formed in 1900, and today supports the school with financial assistance, while working to facilitate communication and interaction between the college and its Old Boys through events and activities, such as alumni and sporting reunions. Reunions are also held in various states of Australia and overseas.

=== Business ===
- David Lee Freedman – racehorse trainer
- Albert Edward Harris AC – company director; Chairman of the Australian Radio Network
- Ezra Norton – newspaper proprietor (also attended Waverley College)
- Tom Parry AM – Chairman of Sydney Water Corporation; Foundation Chairman of the NSW Independent Pricing and Regulatory Tribunal
- Harry Triguboff AO – property developer and billionaire

=== Academia, public service, politics and religious service ===
- Adrien Albert – medicinal chemist
- Graeme Milbourne Clark AC, AO – pioneer of the multiple-channel cochlear implant
- The Hon Peter McCallum Dowding SC – former Premier of Western Australia
- Andrew Hastie MP – current Federal Member for Canning and Shadow Minister for Home Affairs
- Peter Jensen – former Anglican Archbishop of Sydney
- Rear Admiral Sir David James Martin KCMG, AO, KStJ – former Governor of New South Wales

=== Media ===
- Hamish Macdonald – TV journalist and news presenter
- Gordon Neil Stewart journalist and author.

=== Medicine ===
- Charlie Teo – neurosurgeon
- Alistair Jukes – neurosurgeon

=== Sport ===
- Ben Bryant – cricketer
- Jack Buckley - Australian Rules Football (GWS Giants)
- Sam Carter – rugby union player (ACT Brumbies, Western Force and Wallabies)
- Ken Catchpole – rugby union player (Wallabies)
- Angus Crichton – rugby league player (Sydney Roosters)
- Andrew Edmondson – wheelchair rugby player
- Tim Gavin – rugby union player (Eastern Suburbs RUFC, Waratahs, and Wallabies)
- Will Harris – rugby union player (Waratahs)
- David Horwitz – rugby union player (Australian schoolboy, Australian Under 20s, Waratahs and Connacht); and the first Jew to play Super Rugby
- Isaac Humphries – basketballer (Adelaide 36ers)
- Andrew Kellaway – rugby union player as an Australian schoolboy (NEC Green Rockets and Wallabies)
- Harry Kyle — Australian rules footballer (Sydney Swans)
- Darby Lancaster – rugby union player (Melbourne Rebels, New South Wales Waratahs and Wallabies)
- Jack Maddocks – rugby union player (Waratahs and Wallabies)
- James Matheson – freestyle moguls skier who competed at the Winter Olympics in 2018 and 2022
- Toby Rudolf – rugby league player (Cronulla-Sutherland Sharks)
- Colin Scotts – Australian schoolboy rugby union and NFL player (St Louis Cardinals)
- Mitch Short – rugby union player (New South Wales Waratahs)
- Billy Smith – rugby league player (Sydney Roosters)
- Henry Thornton – cricketer (South Australia and Adelaide Strikers)
- Thomas Whalan – four-time Olympian water polo player
- Siua Wong – rugby league player (Sydney Roosters and Fijian national team)
- Jeremy Williams – rugby union player (New South Wales Waratahs, Western Force and Wallabies)

== Gallery ==
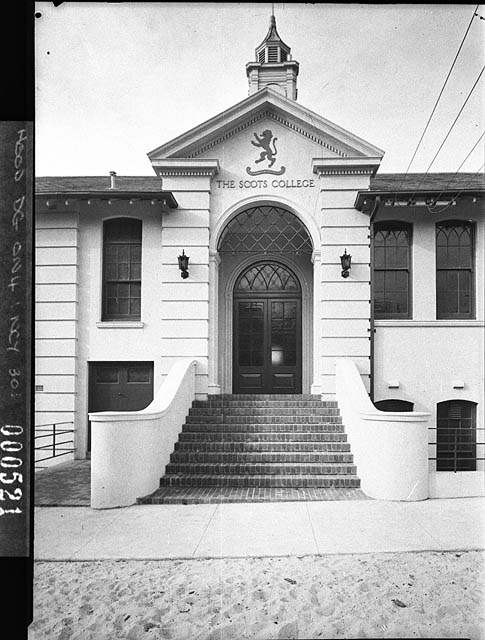
Steps and entrance porch, c. 1939

College Colours Certificate (1930)

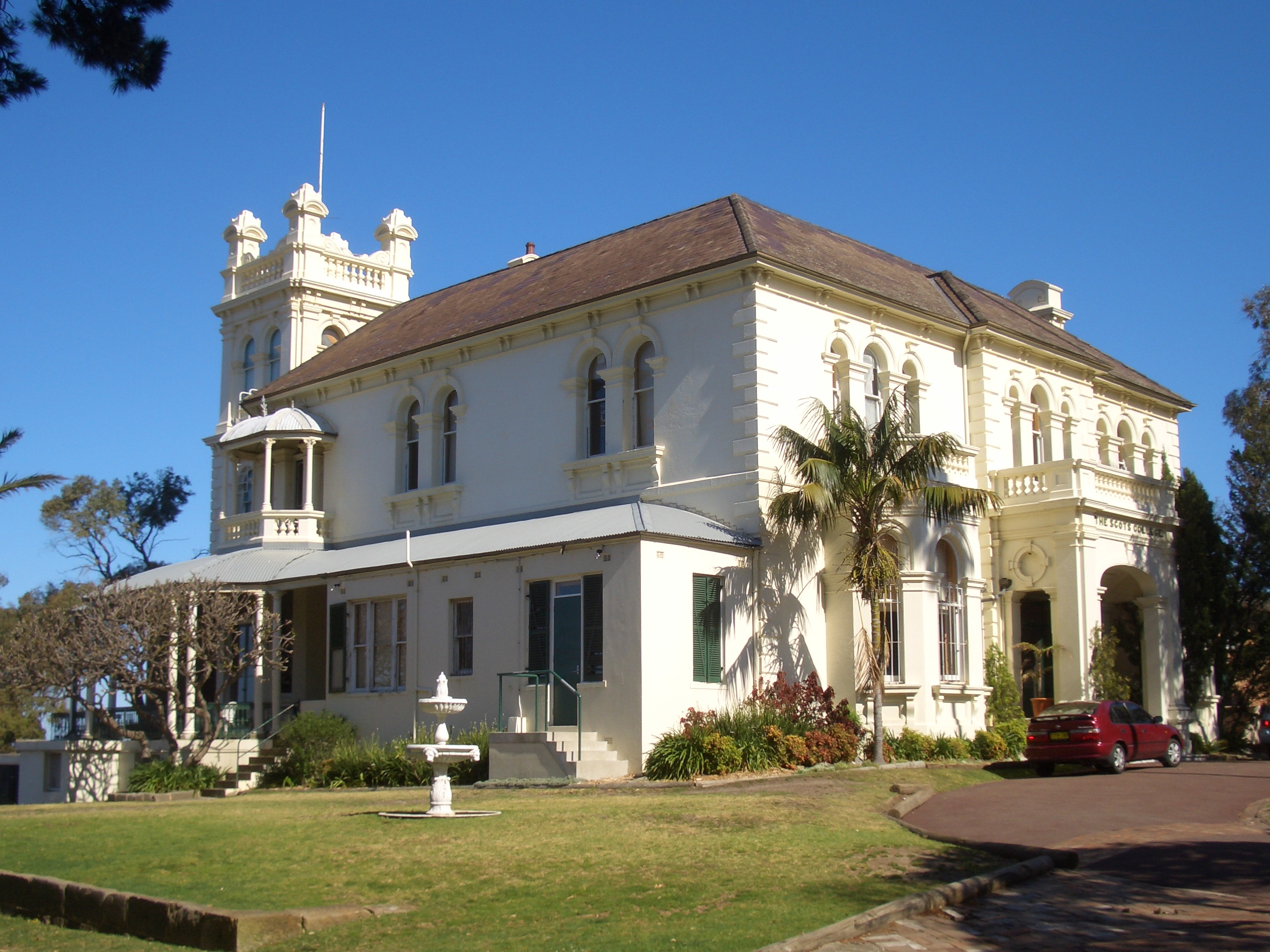
Aspinall House

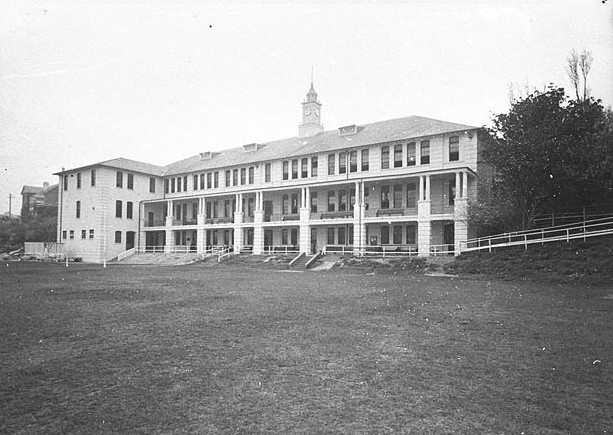
Main Building, 1938

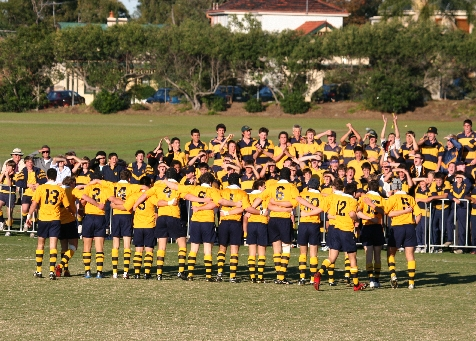
Scots 1st XV singing Auld Lang Syne after a game against St Joseph's College

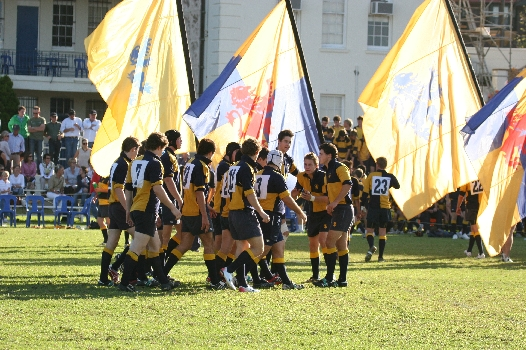
Scots 1st XV 2007

== See also ==
- List of non-government schools in New South Wales
- List of boarding schools in Australia
- History of Brighton-Le-Sands, New South Wales
- List of pipe bands
- Lawrence Campbell Oratory Competition
- Scottish Australians
- Ginahgulla
