= Rona, Bellevue Hill =

Rona
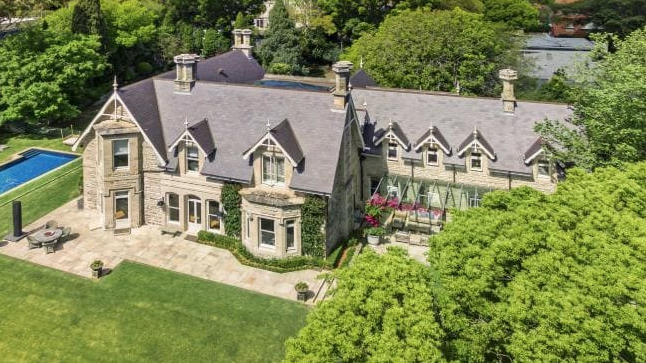

General information
- Type: House
- Architectural style: Victorian Rustic Gothic Revival
- Location: Bellevue Hill, Sydney, New South Wales, Australia
- Completed: 1883
- Client: Edward William Knox
- Owner: Private ownership

Technical details
- Material: Sydney sandstone; Terracotta shingle roof

Design and construction
- Architect: Gustavus Alphonse Morrell

Register of the National Estate
- Official name: Rona
- Type: Defunct register
- Designated: 21 October 19808
- Reference no.: 2579

New South Wales Heritage Database (Local Government Register)
- Official name: Rona - house
- Type: Built
- Designated: 10 March 1995
- Reference no.: Local register

Rona is a historic house in the Sydney suburb of Bellevue Hill, New South Wales, Australia. The house is listed on the (now defunct) Australian Register of the National Estate and is listed on the Municipality of Woollahra local government heritage list. The house is situated in the northern end of the suburb and sold for A$58 million in 2018, making it one of Australia's most expensive homes at the time.

== The estate ==
Rona was originally a 6-hectare (16-acre) estate and was sub-leased from Frederick Tooth, a member of the Tooth family of Cranbrook, by Sir Edward Knox, the founder of CSR Limited. It was bought in 1880 by Knox's son, William Knox, and William Oswald Gilchrist. Knox Jnr and his brother, Tom, built Rona and Leura respectively and in 1900 Gilchrist sold to Sir Colin Stephen who built Llanillo. Stephen was Edward William Knox's son-in-law and his daughter, Helen Rutlege, wrote the story of Rona and the Knox family in a book entitled My Grandfather's House. Llanillo has since been demolished and the land sub-divided but Leura still stands with a Victoria Road address. Rona is still set in expansive, though greatly reduced, gardens that have now been redeveloped by Myles Baldwin.

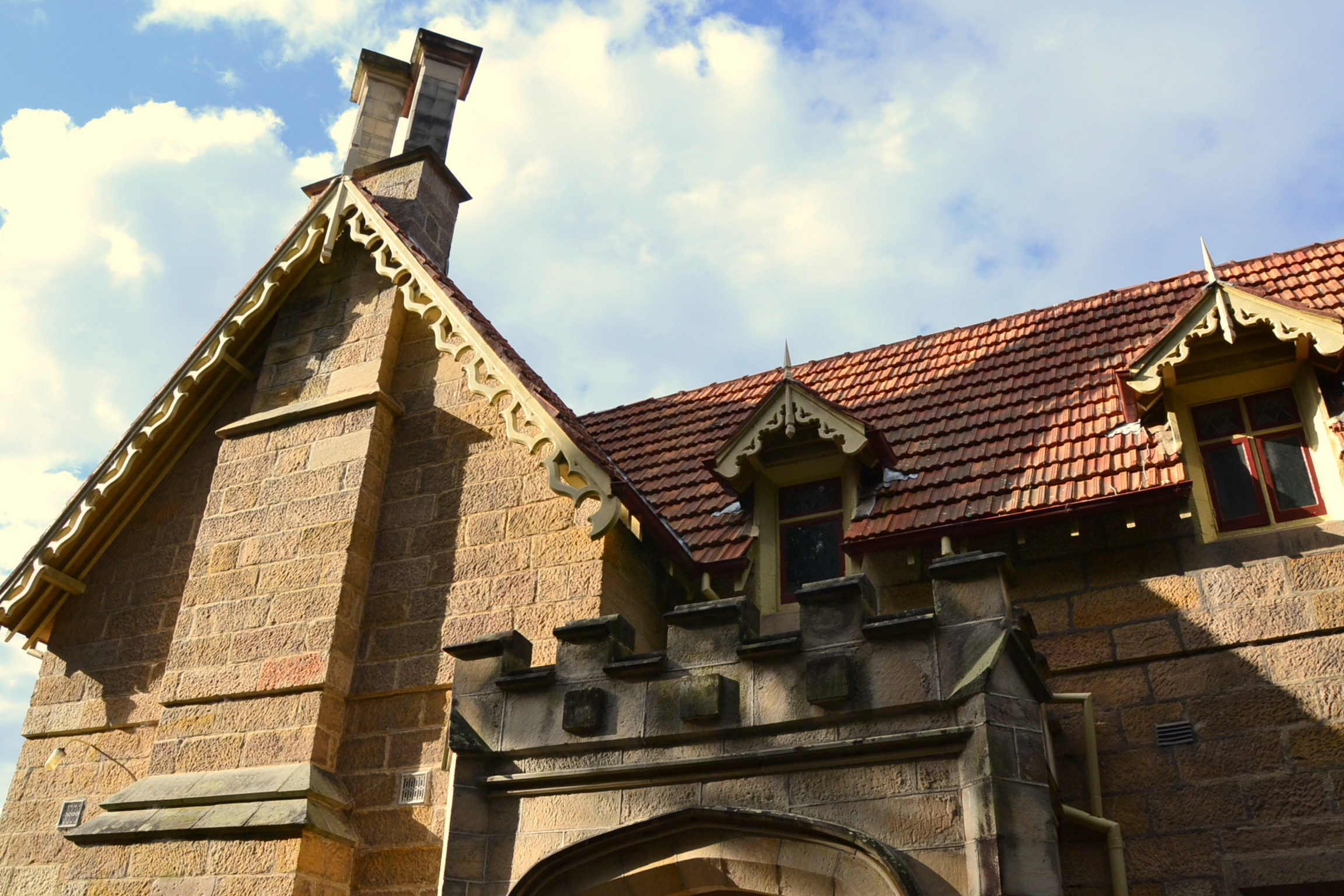
Greycliffe House inspired the design of Rona

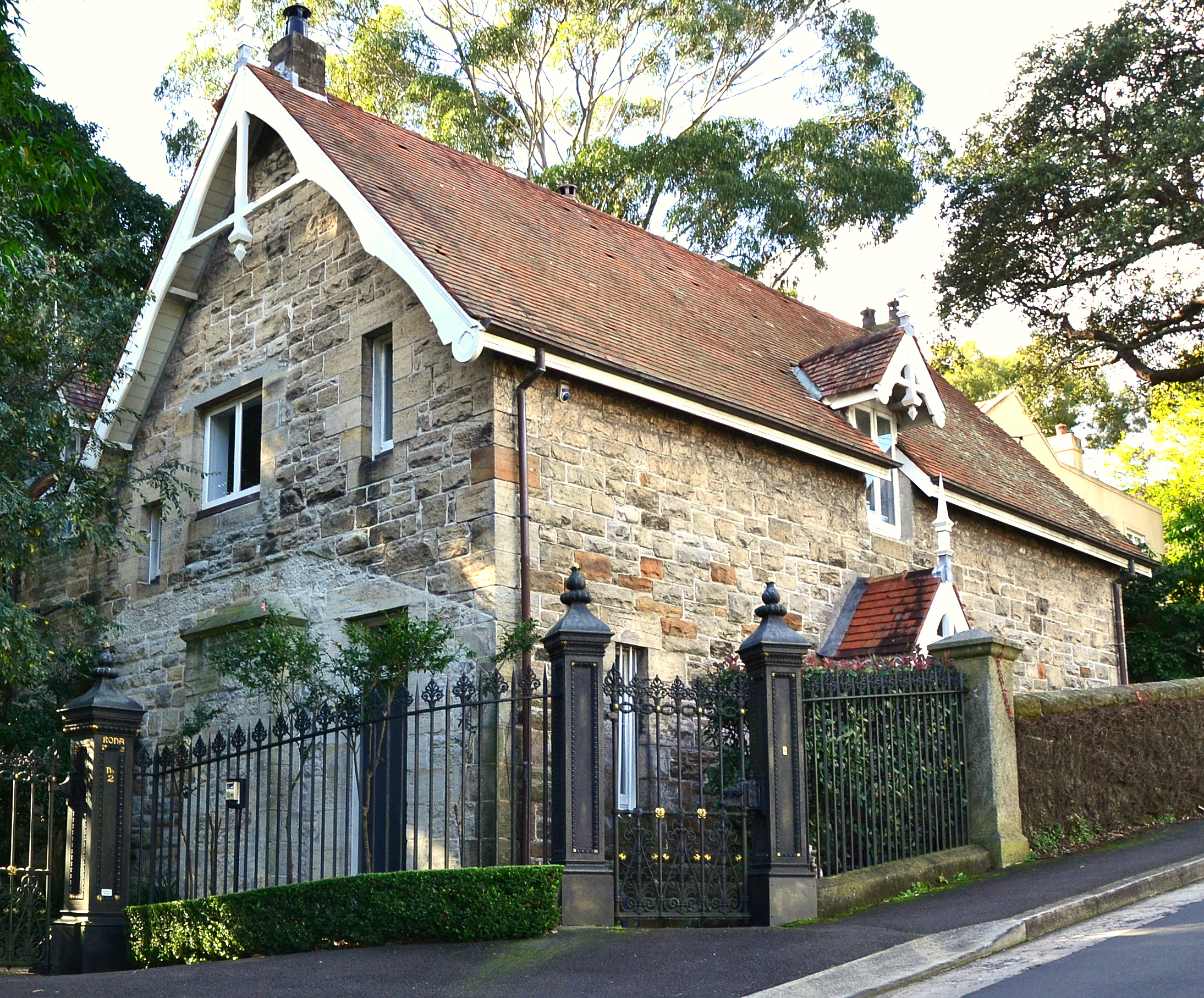
The Rona gate house on Ginahgulla Road

== The house ==
Rona was designed by G. A. Morell and built in 1883 for Edward William Knox. The design was based on Greycliffe House, another heritage-listed home in Nielsen Park, Vaucluse, New South Wales, that had been the childhood home of Mrs Knox. Like Greycliffe, Rona is a two-storey house in the Victorian Rustic Gothic Revival style and built in Sydney sandstone. The house was severely damaged by fire in 1905 and restored with modifications by the architect William Wardell Jnr. In 1951, the architect John Mansfield removed the large south centre gable. This created an internal courtyard and two apartments for descendants of three generations of the Knox family including Martha Rutledge and her daughter and son-in-law Caroline and David Parker. The Parker children who lived at Rona as children in the later part of the last century included The Hon. Justice Guy Parker and Jocelyn Parker, the wife of Philip Lowe, the current Governor of the Reserve Bank of Australia, and John Parker. This century, the courtyard has again been roofed, but in glass, and the area is once again enclosed.

== The stables ==
The stables were built at the same time as the house and in similar style. In 1959 they were converted into a residence by the architect John Amory for a Knox family descendant. The building has now been reunited with the house by the creation of a new driveway and gates from Ginaghulla Road.
