= Fairfax family =

Australian media dynasty

Fairfax
- Former media proprietors; philanthropists
- Current region: Australia
- Origin: Barford, Warwickshire, England
- Members: John Fairfax; Sir James Reading Fairfax; Sir James Oswald Fairfax; Sir Warwick Oswald Fairfax; J. Griffyth Fairfax; Sir Vincent Charles Fairfax; James Fairfax; Warwick Fairfax; John B. Fairfax; Tim Fairfax
- Connected members: Mary, Lady Fairfax; Ruth Fairfax OBE
- Traditions: Congregationalists

Members of the Fairfax Family were prominent as Australian media proprietors, especially in the area of newspaper publishing through the company John Fairfax and Sons (later known as Fairfax Media, although the Fairfax family no longer control the eponymous company). Some members have also been prominent in Australian philanthropy and the arts.

Six generations of the family are descended from Anglo-Celtic immigrants to Australia, patriarch John Fairfax, an English-born journalist, and his wife, Sarah (née Reading). Both were from the Barford area of Warwickshire, and emigrated to the Colony of New South Wales in 1838.

== Generational history ==
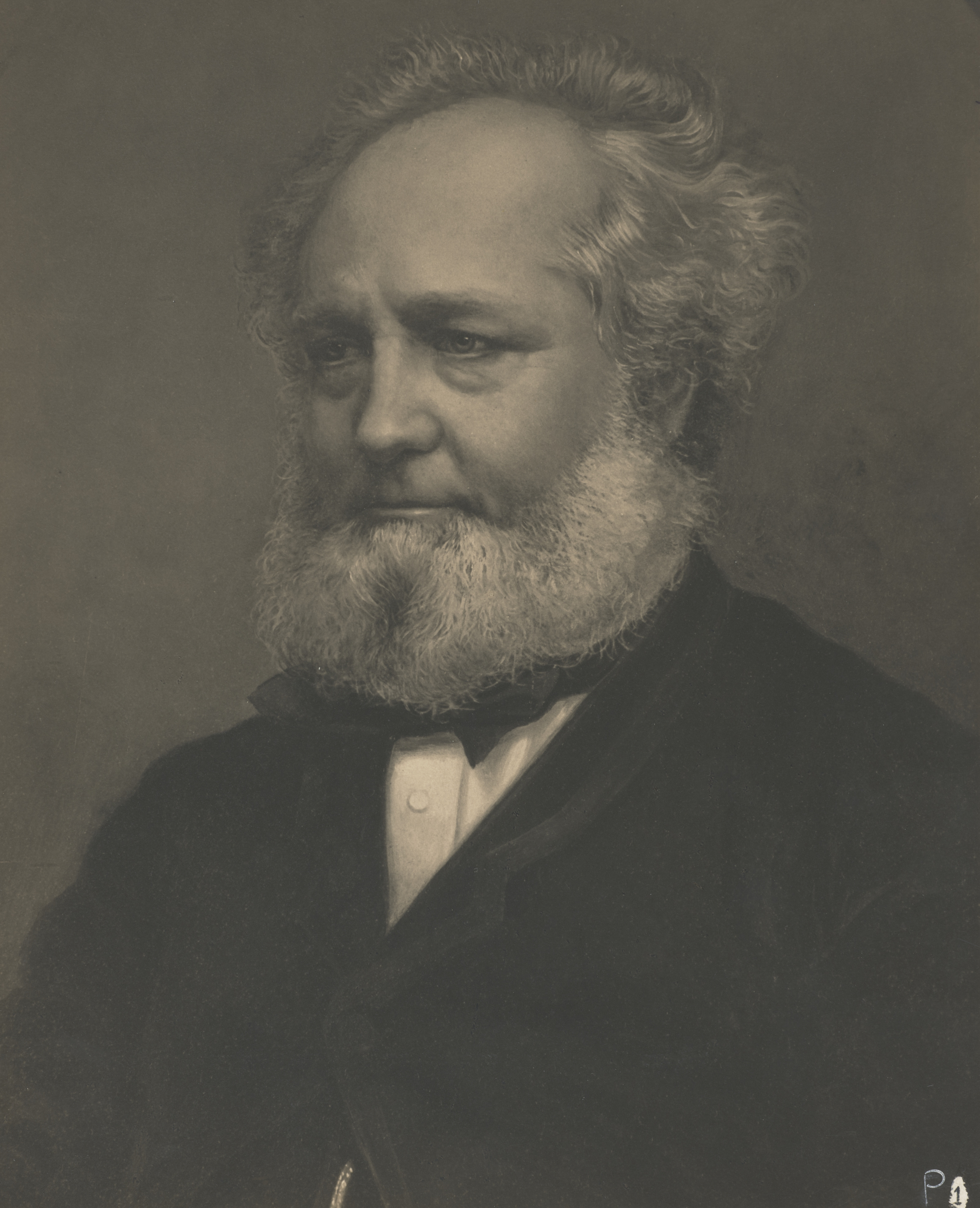
John Fairfax, ca. 1861

=== First generation ===
John Fairfax was born in Barford, Warwickshire, the second son of William Fairfax and his wife, Elizabeth née Jesson. In 1817, John Fairfax was apprenticed to William Perry, a bookseller and printer in Warwick. In 1825, Fairfax went to London where he worked as a compositor in a general printing office and on the Morning Chronicle. A year or two later he established himself at Leamington Hastings as a printer, bookseller and stationer. There, on 31 July 1827, he married Sarah Reading, daughter of James and Sarah Reading. He became the printer of the Leamington Spa Courier, and in 1835 he purchased an interest in another paper The Leamington Chronicle and Warwickshire Reporter. He had a book binding business in Leamington. In 1836, Fairfax published a letter criticizing the conduct of a local solicitor, who brought an action against him. Though judgment was given for the defendant, the solicitor appealed. Judgment was again given for Fairfax but the costs of the actions were so heavy that he had to apply to the Insolvency Court. There was sympathy for him, his friends offered assistance but he decided to make a fresh start in a new land, and in May 1838 sailed for the Colony of New South Wales in the Lady Fitzherbert with his wife and three children, his mother and a brother-in-law. After a voyage of about 130 days, they reached Sydney on 26 September 1838; Fairfax had just £5 in his pocket.

Fairfax worked as a compositor for some months then on 1 April 1839 was appointed librarian of the Australian subscription library. The salary was only £100 a year but he had free quarters for his family in pleasant surroundings. He found he was able to get some typesetting, and he also contributed articles to the various Sydney newspapers. What was possibly more important was his contacting through the library the best educated men of Sydney, and he became friendly with some of them. One of these was a member of the staff of the Sydney Herald, Charles Kemp, with whom he joined forces to purchase the Herald for the sum of £10,000.

The paper was bought on terms, friends helped the two men to find the deposit, and on 8 February 1841 they took control as proprietors. It was good combination for each had qualities that supplemented the other's, they worked in harmony for 12 years and firmly established the paper as the leading Australian newspaper of the day. It was given the fuller title of the Sydney Morning Herald in 1842, and in spite of a period of depression both partners by 1853 were in prosperous positions. Kemp then decided to retire. The partnership was dissolved in September 1853 and Charles, John's eldest son, became a partner. In the previous year his father had visited England and seeking out his old creditors repaid every man in full with interest added. Under Fairfax and his sons the paper continually increased in public favour, and the great increase of population in the 1850s added much to its prosperity. It was always conservative; G. B. Barton in his Literature in New South Wales said in 1866 that its Toryism had "increased in a direct ratio to the Radicalism of the constitution, and its prosperity in a direct ratio to its Toryism". But this is an overstatement. The Herald was moved to its present site in 1856, and at that date claimed to have the largest circulation in the "colonial empire". A weekly journal, The Sydney Mail, was established, its first number was published on 7 July 1860, and it continued to appear until 1938.

In 1851 John Fairfax was a foundation director of the Australian Mutual Provident Society, and in the 1860s a director of the Sydney Insurance Co., the New South Wales Marine Insurance Co., the Australian Joint Stock Bank and The Australian Gaslight Co. and a trustee of the Savings Bank of New South Wales. In his latter years, Fairfax served as a member of the New South Wales Legislative Council from 1874 until his death in 1877, but never took an active part in politics.

Fairfax and his wife, Sarah, née Reading, had four children, Emily, Charles John, James Reading and Edward Ross.

=== Second generation ===
Of John and Sarah Fairfax's four children, Emily Fairfax, the eldest, born in Leamington Spa, Warwickshire, married Joseph Grafton Ross and together they had one child, a son, Elsey Fairfax Ross, who studied medicine at University College Hospital, London and practised in London and Brussels before returning to Sydney where he was an honorary physician at St Vincent's Hospital. Aged 39 years, Emily leaped from a horse carriage after her father, John Fairfax fell from the carriage, following the driver dropping the reins. Emily sustained serious damage to her head and died shortly after.

Charles John Fairfax, the eldest son and also born in Leamington Spa, was also subject to a horse accident as he thrown from his horse and killed, aged 35. Prior to his death, Charles was an apprentice in the Herald and became a member of the firm, named John Fairfax and Sons. Charles and his wife, Anne, née Fairfax, had three children, John A. (Jack), Amy Sarah Elizabeth, and Caroline Elizabeth (Carrie). Jack died of typhoid fever, aged 25. Amy and Carrie never married and followed their mother's philanthropic passions, The Royal Alexandra Hospital for Children (now based at Westmead) and Boy Scouts NSW.

Aged 18 years, James Reading Fairfax began working for his father and in December 1856 with his elder brother, Charles, became a partner in the firm, John Fairfax and Sons. Following the death of Charles in 1863, James Reading became the principal partner in the development of the Herald. The same year he married Lucy, née Armstrong, and together they had seven children: Mary Elizabeth, Charles Burton, Geoffrey Evan, James Oswald, Harold Walter, (John) Hubert Fraser, and Edward Wilfred. James Reading was prominent in both business and philanthropy. Like his father, James Reading was a director of the Australian Mutual Provident Society, and he was a founder of the Perpetual Trustee Company, and a director of the Bank of New South Wales, the Commercial Banking Company of Sydney and Burns, Philp & Co. Limited. His philanthropic interests were numerous and included Young Men's Christian Association, the Boys' Brigade in Sydney, the Sydney Ragged Schools, Royal Prince Alfred Hospital, the New South Wales Bush Nursing Association, the Mission to Seamen, Goodenough Royal Naval House and the Volunteer Rifles, the No. 3 Company, Sydney Battalion where he served as captain, the New South Wales Academy of Art, the National Art Gallery of New South Wales, the (Royal) Philharmonic Society of Sydney, the Sydney Amateur Orchestral Society, the Sydney Symphony Orchestra, the Royal Society of New South Wales, the Royal Sydney Yacht Squadron, the Union Club and the Royal Sydney Golf Club. James Reading Fairfax was appointed a Knight Bachelor in 1898 and died in 1919, aged 85 years.

Edward Ross Fairfax, the youngest child of John and Sarah Fairfax, was born in Sydney and like his two brothers entered the family business, was appointed a partner of John Fairfax and Sons, publishers of the Sydney Morning Herald and the Sydney Mail. He married Catherine, née Mackenzie. After retiring from the firm, Edward Ross and Catherine lived in England. Edward died in 1915, aged 72 years. His wife died a year later.

=== Third generation ===
Mary Elizabeth Fairfax, a philanthropist, community worker and spinster, was the eldest child of James Reading Fairfax and Lucy Fairfax. Miss Mary's philanthropic and community interests included The Women's College, University of Sydney, Girl Guides' Association, the Boys' Brigade, the Royal Society for the Prevention of Cruelty to Animals, the Young Women's Christian Association, the Kindergarten Union, the (Sydney) District Nursing Association, the Bush Book Club, the Australian Comforts Fund, the British (Australian) Red Cross Society, the Victoria League, the Society of Arts and Crafts of New South Wales, and the Sydney Symphony Orchestral Ladies' Committee.

Charles Burton Fairfax, the second eldest child, married Florence Marie, née Frazer, and they had one child, a son, later known as Captain J. Griffyth Fairfax. Charles entered the family business, John Fairfax and Sons, as a partner in 1888 until his retirement 16 years later in 1904. Upon his retirement he lived in London where he died in 1941. His philanthropic and military service interests included the NSW South Wales Lancers, the Queen Victoria Homes and the Royal Prince Alfred Hospital. His wife, Florence, was granted a divorce, decree nisi, in 1919 on the grounds of misconduct by Charles.

Geoffrey Evan Fairfax was for over forty years a proprietor of John Fairfax and Sons where he became chairman of the listed company, John Fairfax and Sons, Ltd, publishers of the Sydney Morning Herald and the Sunday Mail. Educated at Sydney Grammar School and Oxford University, Geoffrey married Anne Madeleine (Lena), a daughter of Francis Hixson, and they had no children. His philanthropic and community interests included the New South Wales Rowing Association, the Royal Sydney Yacht Squadron, the Sailors' Home, the Navy League, the Boys' Brigade, the Bush Nursing Association, and the Australian Trained Nurses' Association. Upon his death, proceeds of his estate were distributed to his family.

James Oswald Fairfax was born in Sydney and educated at the Sydney Grammar School and Balliol College, Oxford and he was called to the Bar of the Inner Temple and admitted to the Colonial Bar in Sydney in 1887. Two years later he became a partner in the family firm, John Fairfax and Sons and in 1892 married Mabel Alice Emmeline, also a daughter of Francis Hixson. They had one child, a son, Warwick Oswald Fairfax. In late 1900 the family purchased Fairwater and made significant renovations in 1910–11. James became a director of the listed company, John Fairfax and Sons Limited in 1916 and a director of the Perpetual Trustee Co., the United Insurance Co. and the AMP Society. His philanthropic interests included the New South Wales branch of the Red Cross Society, the Boys' Brigade and the Sydney Grammar School Old Boys' Union. Appointed an Officer of the Order of the British Empire in March 1918 in recognition of service as the Chairman of the NSW Red Cross Society, and a Commander of the Order in May of the same year, Fairfax was knighted as a Knight Commander of the Order in July 1926 in recognition of service as the Chairman of the Empire Press Union.

Harold Walter Fairfax, also born in Sydney, followed the same path as his elder brother, James, and was educated at the Sydney Grammar School and Balliol College and he was called to the Bar of the Inner Temple and admitted to the Bar of New South Wales in 1893. He married Elsie, née Cape, and they were childless. He purchased a property near Young and successfully grew wheat and farmed sheep. His philanthropic interests included the Royal Alexandra Hospital for Children. He died, aged 42 years, from acute tetanus.

John Hubert Fraser Fairfax, commonly known as Hubert Fairfax, was born in Sydney and also educated at the Sydney Grammar School and Bath College, England. On his return to Australia, Hubert commenced work with Dalgety & Co. Ltd and married Ruth Beatrice (Fairfax) OBE, née Dowling, a founder of the Country Women's Association. The federal electorate of Fairfax is named in honour of Ruth Fairfax. They had one child. Hubert and Ruth spent much of their life in Queensland where they bred Ayrshire cattle and Corriedale sheep, acquiring properties at Longreach, Marinya, near Cambooya on the Darling Downs, and in Sydney in Double Bay and Castle Hill. Hubert's business interests included directorships of John Fairfax and Sons Limited, the Bank of New South Wales, the AMP Society and the Royal Insurance Co. His philanthropic interests included the Walter and Eliza Hall Trust, the Young Men's Christian Association, the Boys' Brigade, the Australian Air League, the British Empire Society, the Legacy Club of Sydney, the Ayrshire Association of Queensland, the Australian Corriedale Sheepbreeders' Association, the New South Wales Sheepbreeders' Association and the Royal Agricultural Society of New South Wales.

Edward Wilfred Fairfax was the youngest child of James Reading Fairfax and Lucy Fairfax. He was born in Sydney and also educated at the Sydney Grammar School and Bath College, England. He studied medicine and graduated from the University of Sydney and commenced employment as a resident medical officer at the Royal Prince Alfred Hospital, and undertook further studies in England. Dr Fairfax lectured at Sydney University, was a visiting medical officer at the Royal Hospital for Women, an honorary medical officer of the Red Cross Society (NSW), and was a founding member of the Royal Australasian College of Physicians. He served with the Australian Army Medical Corps in World War I and consulted to the Army after the war. His philanthropic interests included the Australian Aerial Medical Service, Dr. Barnardo's Homes, the Bush Nursing Association, and the Boys' Brigade. As well as serving as a director of the unlisted John Fairfax and Sons Pty. Ltd, Dr Fairfax was a director of the Colonial Sugar Refining Company and a director of the Commercial Banking Company of Sydney. Dr Fairfax and his wife, Mary Marguerite, raised three children.

=== Fourth generation ===
J. Griffyth Fairfax, a British poet, translator, and politician, was born in Sydney, the only child of Charles Burton Fairfax and Florence Marie, née Frazer. Educated at Winchester School and New College, Oxford, Fairfax served in the 15th Indian Division for the duration of the First World War, and rose to the rank of Captain in the Army Service Corps. Fairfax was a Member of the UK House of Commons representing the borough constituency of Norwich for the Conservative and Unionist Party from the 1924 election until the 1929 election. His first volume of poetry was published in 1908. He was also active in literary circles and had an influence on and was influenced by his friend Ezra Pound.

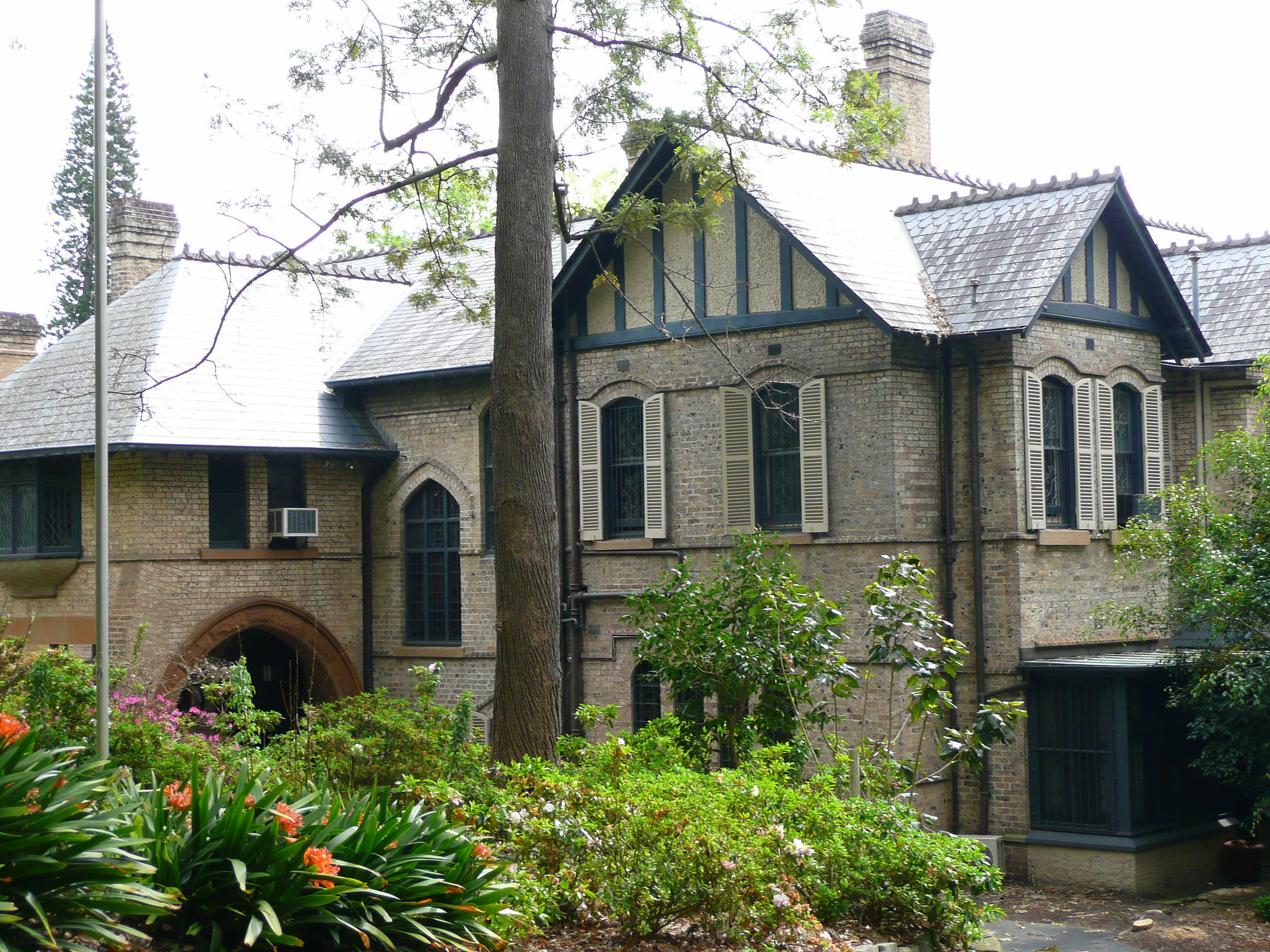
Fairwater, the home of Sir Warwick Fairfax and his family in Double Bay

Warwick Oswald Fairfax was an Australian businessman prominent in the arts as both a philanthropist and a playwright. The only child of Sir James Oswald Fairfax and Mabel Alice, née Hixson, he was born in Sydney and educated at Geelong Grammar School, the University of Sydney (where he was resident at St Paul's College), and at Balliol College, Oxford. Fairfax's first marriage was to Marcie Elizabeth (Betty), née Wilson in 1921, until their divorce 24 years later. They had two children. Fairfax's second marriage was to Hanne, née Anderson in 1948, until their divorce 11 years later. He had one child with his second wife. His third and final marriage was to Mary, née Wein; now known as Lady Fairfax AC, OBE, a Polish-born Australian philanthropist. With his third wife, Sir Warwick had three children. Sir Warwick joined the family firm, John Fairfax and Sons, in 1925, was appointed a director in 1927 and managing director in 1930. During his time as managing director and subsequently chairman, Fairfax was instrumental in floating the then privately held John Fairfax & Sons Pty Ltd as John Fairfax Limited, later John Fairfax Holdings Limited and subsequently Fairfax Media.

"Sir Warwick's contribution to the Fairfax company, which expanded so markedly in his lifetime, was perhaps the greatest of any of the Fairfaxes since the company's founder..... Sir Warwick's guidance of the Herald coincided with the expansion of John Fairfax into one of the great public companies of Australia, with interests in television, radio and newsprint, as well as newspapers and magazines."

— James Fairfax, Chairman of John Fairfax Limited in 1987 and a son of Sir Warwick.

He owned extensive property holdings, south-west of Sydney where he bred cattle. This area was subsequently developed into outer residential developments in the suburb of Harrington Park. His philanthropic interests included the acquisition of publications that supported contemporary Australian artists, the acquisition of works by leading Australian painters, the financial backing of the Kirsova ballet company, the Australian Elizabethan Theatre Trust and service on the governing council of the Australian National University. He was appointed a Knight Bachelor in 1967 in recognition of his service to the community.

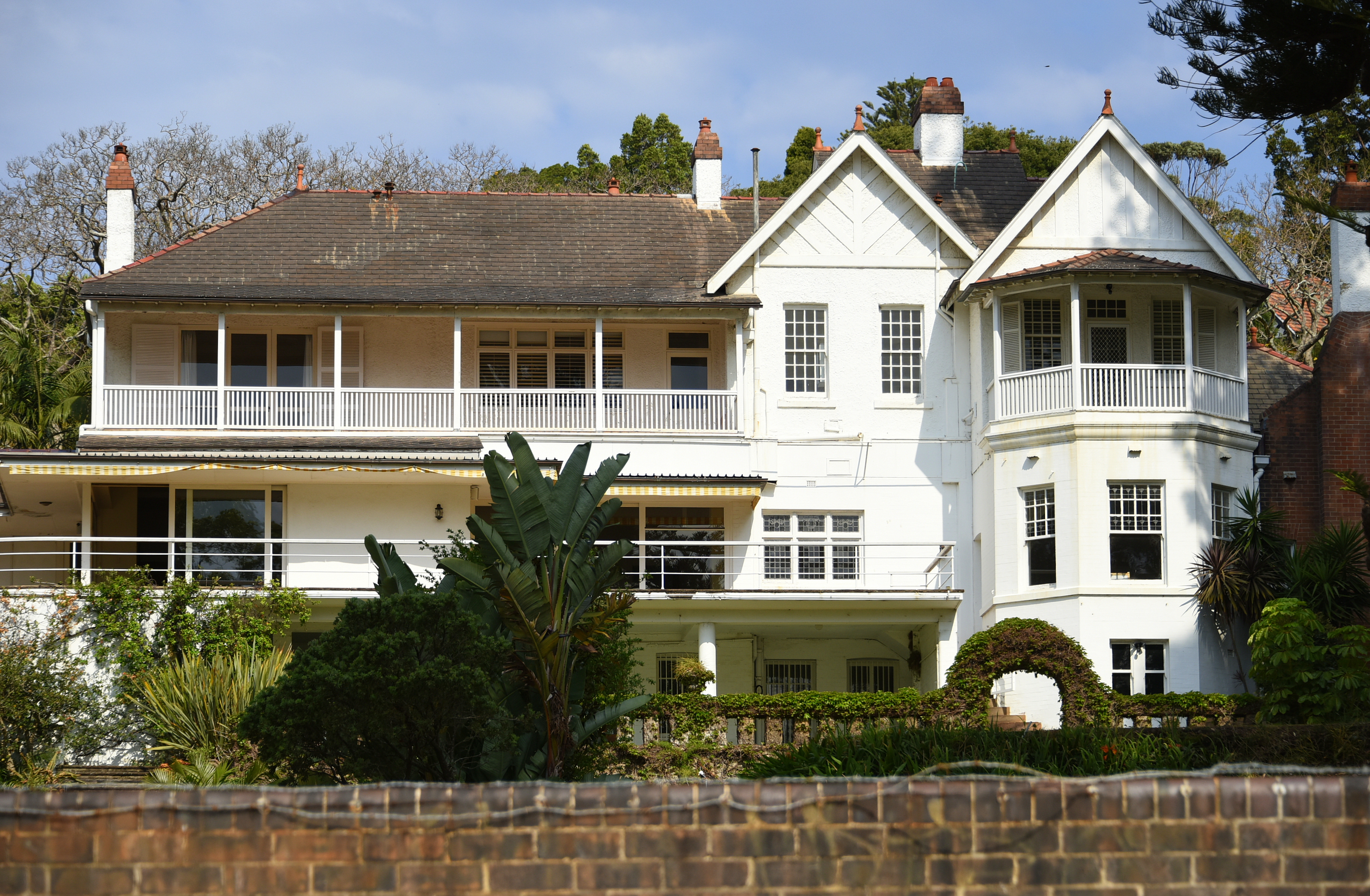
Elaine, the home of Sir Vincent Fairfax and his family in Point Piper

Vincent Charles Fairfax, the only child of Hubert Fairfax and Ruth Beatrice, née Dowling, was born in Cambooya, Queensland. He was educated at Cranbrook School, Geelong Grammar School and Brasenose College, Oxford. He joined the family firm in 1936 and became the manager of the London office in 1938. He served in the 2nd Australian Imperial Force in World War II and saw active duty in the 1945 Borneo Campaign. After the war, he became a proprietor of John Fairfax and Sons, a director of the publicly listed John Fairfax Holdings Limited, and served as a director of both the AMP Society and the Bank of New South Wales. His philanthropic interests were widespread and included the Art Gallery of NSW, the Boy Scout Association, Outward Bound, the Royal Flying Doctor Service, The Salvation Army, the Sydney City Mission, and the University of Western Sydney. During his lifetime he facilitated the establishment of the Vincent Fairfax Family Foundation, a major Australian philanthropic organisation. Sir Vincent was appointed a Companion of the Order of St Michael and St George in 1960 for public services and appointed a Knight Bachelor in 1971 in recognition of service to youth, finance and the press. With his wife, (Lady) Nancy, née Heald, they had two sons and two daughters. He died in 1993 after a long illness. Sir Vincent was posthumously inducted into the Queensland Business Leaders Hall of Fame in 2014.

=== Fifth generation ===
There are fourteen known members of the fifth generation of the Fairfax family. Those detailed below are the most prominent in Australian society and business.

James Fairfax, the eldest son of Warwick Oswald Fairfax and Marcie Elizabeth (Betty), née Wilson, was born in Sydney and educated at Cranbrook School, Geelong Grammar School and Balliol College, Oxford. He became a director of John Fairfax & Sons Ltd in 1957 and took over from his father in 1977. He became Chairman of the company and resigned in 1987 and sold his shares to his half brother, Warwick Fairfax, during 'young Warwick's' ultimately disastrous takeover bid of the publicly listed company. A prominent art collector, initially of Australian art, and from the 1960s increasingly of European old masters. He is a generous supporter of the Art Gallery of New South Wales (AGNSW) and the National Gallery of Australia. A catalogue of his collection of art was published to accompany an exhibition held at the AGNSW in 2003. He was appointed an Officer (AO) of the Order of Australia in 1993 in recognition of service to the arts and to the community; and a Companion of the Order (AC) in 2010 for eminent service to the community through support and philanthropy for the visual arts, conservation organisations and building programs for medical research and educational facilities. Fairfax published My regards to Broadway: a memoir in 1991; and died at his property Retford Park, Bowral (which he bequeathed to the National Trust) in January 2017, aged 83 years.

Warwick Fairfax is the eldest son from the third marriage of Warwick Oswald Fairfax to Mary, née Wein, later known as Lady Mary. Young Warwick, as he came to be known, graduated from Oxford University with an undergraduate degree in politics and economics and was awarded his MBA from Harvard Business School. In 1987, following the death of his father, the 26-year-old Young Warwick took over control of the publicly listed John Fairfax Holdings Limited by purchasing shares that were held by various members of the extended Fairfax family and others. On 10 December 1990 the newly privatised company collapsed and a receiver was appointed. Fairfax subsequently relocated to the United States where he founded a business consultancy and executive coach business.

Notable children of Sir Vincent Charles Fairfax and (Lady) Nancy, née Heald, include John Brehmer Fairfax, commonly called John B., and Timothy Vincent (Tim) Fairfax. After selling out of John Fairfax Holdings in 1997, John B. and Tim Fairfax invested in Rural Press, Courier Newspapers (now known as NewsLocal), and a range of property and diversified investments. John B. and Tim Fairfax and family regained partial control of the listed–Fairfax Media through a friendly merger in 2007 between Rural Press and Fairfax Media; that, by 2011, had collapsed and the Fairfax family sold all controlling interests in the eponymous company. John B.'s philanthropic interests include the Girls and Boys Brigade and the Royal Agricultural Society of New South Wales. He was appointed a Member of the Order of Australia (AM) in 1994 in recognition of service to the community and to the media; and an Officer of the Order (AO) in 2009 for service to the print media industry, particularly the development of news services in rural and remote areas, and to the community through executive roles with agricultural, youth and charitable organisations. Tim Fairfax is a businessman, pastoralist and philanthropist. In addition to his business interests, his philanthropic interests include the Queensland University of Technology, the Vincent Fairfax Family Foundation, the Tim Fairfax Family Foundation, The Salvation Army, the National Gallery of Australia, Queensland Art Gallery Foundation, the Foundation for Rural and Regional Renewal, Australian Philanthropic Services, Philanthropy Australia, the Royal National Association Queensland, the AMA Queensland Foundation, The University of Sunshine Coast Foundation and Volunteers for Isolated Students Education. Tim was appointed a Member of the Order of Australia (AM) in 2004 for service to business and commerce, particularly through agricultural, transport and communications enterprises, and to the community, through education and arts organisations; and a Companion of the Order (AC) in 2014 for eminent service to business and to the community, as an advocate for philanthropy and as a major supporter of the visual arts, to the promotion of higher education opportunities, and to rural and regional development programs.

In 2017 the Fairfax family sold its long-held Sydney harbourside home, Elaine, for approximately A$75 million. The home in Point Piper set on 6,986 square metres (75,200 sq ft) had been in the ownership of the Fairfax family since 1891 but had not been lived in by a family member for nearly twenty years prior to the sale.

== Family tree ==
- William Fairfax m. Elizabeth, née Jesson
  - John Fairfax m. Sarah, née Reading
    - Emily, née Fairfax m. Joseph Grafton Ross
      - (Dr.) Elsey Fairfax Ross m. Edith, née ???
        - (John) Grafton Fairfax Ross
        - (Brigadier Captain) Basil Edward Fairfax Ross m. Doris Riverstone, née McCulloch
          - Basil Edward Fairfax Ross (Junior) m. Jessie Agnes, née Dalton
        - Thomas Fairfax Ross m. Rene, née Murray
    - Charles John Fairfax m. Anne, née Fairfax
      - John A. (Jack) Fairfax
      - Amy Sarah Elizabeth Fairfax
      - Caroline Elizabeth (Carrie) Fairfax
    - Sir James Reading Fairfax m. Lucy, née Armstrong
      - Mary Elizabeth Fairfax
      - Charles Burton Fairfax m. Florence Marie, née Frazer (div. 1919)
        - Captain J. Griffyth Fairfax
      - Geoffrey Evan Fairfax m. Anne Madeleine (Lena), née Hixson
      - Sir James Oswald Fairfax m. Mabel Alice, née Hixson
        - Warwick Oswald Fairfax m. (1921) Marcie Elizabeth (Betty), née Wilson (div. 1945)
          - James Fairfax
          - Caroline, née Fairfax m. Edward Phillip Simpson
        - Warwick Oswald Fairfax m. (1948) Hanne, née Anderson (div. 1959)
          - Annalise Fairfax
        - Sir Warwick Oswald Fairfax m. (1959) (Lady) Mary, née Wein
          - Warwick Fairfax m. Gail, née ???
          - Anna, née Fairfax m. David Cleary
          - Charles Fairfax
      - Harold Walter Fairfax m. Elsie, née Cape
      - (John) Hubert Fraser Fairfax m. Ruth Beatrice (Fairfax) OBE, née Dowling
        - Sir Vincent Charles Fairfax m. (Lady) Nancy, née Heald
          - Sally, née Fairfax m. Geoffrey White
            - Angus White
            - Christopher White
          - John Brehmer Fairfax m. Libby, née ???
            - Nicholas John (Nick) Fairfax
          - Timothy Vincent Fairfax m. Gina, née ???
            - Sarah, née Fairfax m. Joseph O’Brien
            - Lucy, née Fairfax m. José Coulson
            - Fiona, née Fairfax m. Ben Poschelk
            - Prue, née Fairfax m. James Pateras
          - Ruth née Fairfax m. ??? Armytage
            - Emilia Fairfax Armytage
            - Hamish Vincent Patteson Armytage
      - (Dr.) Edward Wilfred Fairfax m. Mary Marguerite, née ???
        - John Fitzgerald Fairfax m. Valerie, née ???
        - Herbert Desmond (Mick) Fairfax m. Suzanne, née ???
          - Dymphna, née Fairfax
          - Diana, née Fairfax
          - Prudence, née Fairfax
        - E., née Fairfax m. ?? Chauvel
    - Edward Ross Fairfax m. Catherine, née Mackenzie

== See also ==
- Fairwater (Double Bay)
- Fairfax Media
- Ginahgulla, Bellevue Hill
- Harrington Park (homestead)
- Harrington Park
- Orielton
