= Harrington Grove =

- Suburb
- Country: Australia
- State: New South Wales
- City: Sydney
- LGA: Camden Council
- Location: 53 km (33 mi) from Sydney CBD

Government
  - State electorate: Camden
  - Federal division: Macarthur
- Postcode: 2567
Suburbs around Harrington Grove
Oran Park	Gledswood Hills	Eschol Park
Harrington Park	Harrington Grove	Eagle Vale
Smeaton Grange	Currans Hill	Blairmount

Harrington Grove is a community in the suburb of Harrington Park, in the state of New South Wales, Australia. It is located 52 kilometres south-west of the Sydney central business district, in the local government area of the Camden Council and is part of the Greater Western Sydney region.

Harrington Grove is a masterplanned residential community situated within the Harrington Park estate and managed by Harrington Estates on behalf of the estate of Lady Mary Fairfax.

== History ==
Harrington Grove was originally part of 1620 acres granted to Edward Lord by Governor Macquarie in 1815. He called this property Orielton after the Orielton estate in Pembroke, Wales, that the Lord family had previously inherited.

The neighbouring property, Harrington Park, was part of a 2,000 acre property granted to trader Captain William Douglas Campbell as compensation for the loss of his snow Harrington which was seized by convicts, from its anchorage in Sydney Harbour, on the evening of 15 May 1808. In March 1809, His Majesty's Ship Dedaigneuse fell in with the Harrington near Manila, in the Philippines, and after a short engagement the vessel was driven on shore and totally destroyed. Campbell called the land Harrington Park in remembrance of his vessel.

In 1944, Sir Warwick Oswald Fairfax (at that time Director of John Fairfax Ltd) bought both properties from Arthur and Elaine Swan. Until 1976, Fairfax ran a Poll Hereford stud where he bred many show winning champions.

As part of the purchase, Sir Warwick inherited the Orielton Homestead, a 26-room, state heritage-significant property that had a colourful past across almost two centuries, under 13 owners. In 2018, a three-year restoration of the homestead was completed by the development company for the Lady Mary Fairfax Estate, Harrington Estates.
