= James Fairfax =

Australian business executive and philanthropist (1933–2017)

James Fairfax AC
- Born: James Oswald Fairfax; 27 March 1933; Sydney
- Died: 11 January 2017 (aged 83); Bowral, New South Wales
- Education: Cranbrook School, Sydney; Geelong Grammar School, Victoria; Balliol College, Oxford
- Occupations: Company director; philanthropist
- Parent(s): Sir Warwick Fairfax; Betty Fairfax (née Wilson)
- Relatives: John Fairfax (great-grandfather); Sir James Oswald Fairfax (grandfather); David Wilson (grandfather); Warwick Fairfax (half-brother); Mary Fairfax (step-mother)

James Oswald Fairfax (27 March 1933 – 11 January 2017) was an Australian company director, philanthropist, and a member of the Fairfax family, an Australian family prominent in the newspaper publisher industry.

== Biography ==
Fairfax was born in Sydney, the eldest son of Sir Warwick Oswald Fairfax and Marcie Elizabeth (Betty) Wilson. He is the grandson of Sir James Oswald Fairfax (1863–1928) and David Wilson KC (1879–1965).

Educated at Fairfield, Cranbrook School, Geelong Grammar School and Balliol College, Oxford, he became a director of John Fairfax & Sons Ltd in 1957 and took over from his father in 1977. He resigned in 1987 and sold his shares to his half brother Warwick Fairfax, during 'young Warwick's' ultimately disastrous takeover bid.

Fairfax published a memoir in 1991. He died single having never married on 11 January 2017 at the age of 83.

== Philanthropy and honours ==
A prominent art collector, initially of Australian art, and from the 1960s increasingly of European old masters. He was a generous supporter of the Art Gallery of New South Wales and the National Gallery of Australia. A catalogue of his collection of art was published to accompany an exhibition held at the Art Gallery of New South Wales, between April and July 2003. In 2015, Fairfax's net worth was estimated in the BRW Rich 200 to be A$302 million, comprising a mix of property, diversified investments and an extensive collection of art and antiques.

The James Fairfax Yard building in the Holywell Manor complex at Balliol College, Oxford is named in his honour for his donations to the college.

He was appointed an Officer (AO) of the Order of Australia in 1993 in recognition of service to the arts and to the community; and a Companion of the Order (AC) in 2010 for eminent service to the community through support and philanthropy for the visual arts, conservation organisations and building programs for medical research and educational facilities.

In 2016 Fairfax gifted his Retford Park, Bowral property to the National Trust of Australia.
