= Tim Fairfax =

Australian philanthropist

Tim Fairfax AC
- Born: Timothy Vincent Fairfax
- Occupations: Philanthropist and pastoralist
- Office: Chancellor of the Queensland University of Technology
- Term: 8 September 2012 – 31 December 2019
- Predecessor: Peter Arnison
- Successor: Xiaoling Liu
- Spouse: Gina Fairfax
- Children: 4
- Parents: Sir Vincent Charles Fairfax; Lady Nancy Fairfax
- Relatives: Ruth Fairfax OBE (grandmother); Sir James Fairfax (great-grandfather); John Fairfax (great-great-grandfather)

Timothy Vincent Fairfax is an Australian philanthropist, pastoralist and a member of the Fairfax family. He leads a charitable foundation called the Tim Fairfax Family Foundation, created in 2008.

== Biography ==
Throughout his life, Fairfax has served in a variety of roles within a large number of organisations. This includes serving as president of the Queensland Art Gallery Foundation, deputy chairman of the National Gallery of Australia, director of the Foundation of Rural and Regional Renewal (FRRR), council member of Australia Philanthropic Services, chairman of the Salvation Army Advisory Board, deputy chancellor of the University of the Sunshine Coast and chairman of the University of the Sunshine Coast Foundation.

He is a director of a number of other companies, including JH Fairfax & Son which owns agricultural properties throughout Queensland and New South Wales. He is also a patron of AMA Queensland.

In 2008, Fairfax founded the Tim Fairfax Family Foundation in a bid to support people in rural and remote communities throughout Queensland and the Northern Territory.

Fairfax revealed in 2014 that he believes he suffered from undiagnosed mental health issues in the early 1970s during a downturn in the cattle market and was using that experience to encourage people in remote areas to access funding, made available by his foundation for a program run by the FRRR, to help their mental wellbeing during difficult times.

In 2012, he was appointed chancellor of the Queensland University of Technology, serving until 2019.

In 2017 he spoke at the second annual Queensland Philanthropy Showcase, encouraging arts philanthropy.

As a fifth generation member of the Fairfax family, Fairfax is a great-great-grandson of John Fairfax, and until 2008 was a shareholder in Fairfax Media. His grandmother was Ruth Fairfax, the inaugural president of the Queensland Country Women's Association.

== Honours ==
Fairfax received the Goldman Sachs Philanthropy Leadership Award in 2011. He was named as a Queensland Great in 2013.

In the 2014 Australia Day Honours Fairfax was appointed a Companion of the Order of Australia.

He was a national finalist in the Senior Australian of the Year category at the 2016 Australian of the Year awards but lost to Professor Gordian Fulde.

Academic offices
Preceded by Peter Arnison	Chancellor of Queensland University of Technology; 2012–2019	Succeeded by Xiaoling Liu
