= Fairwater, Double Bay =

Fairwater
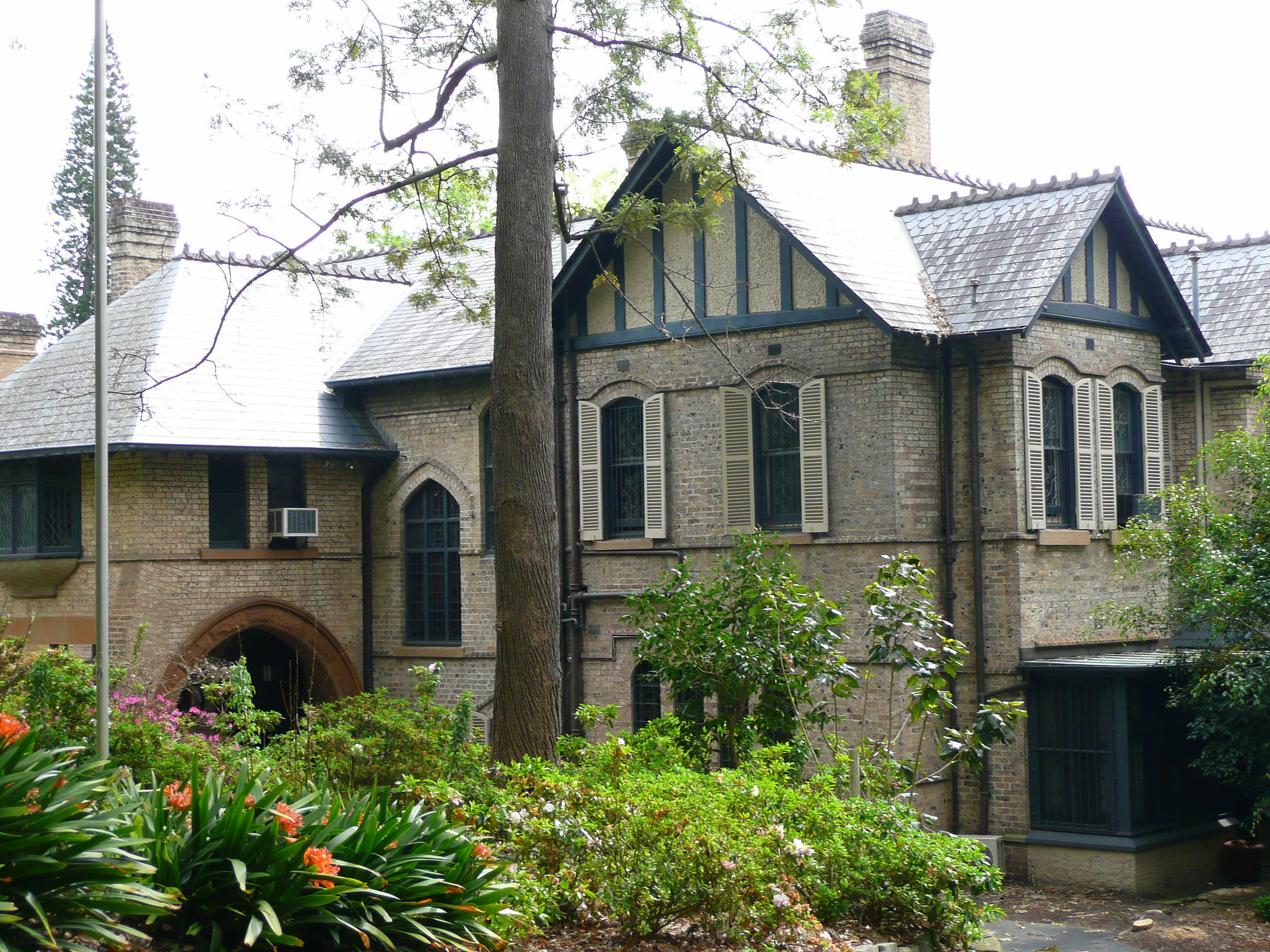

- Location within Sydney Location within Australia
- 33°52′18″S 151°14′58″E
- Location: 560 New South Head Road, Double Bay, Sydney, Australia

History
- Built: 1882–1970
- Built for: Francis Edward Joseph

Site notes
- Area: 8,000 square metres (86,000 sq ft)
- Architects: John Horbury Hunt (1882); J. W. Manson (c. 1910–11)
- Architectural style: Federation Arts and Crafts
- Owner: Mike Cannon-Brookes

New South Wales Heritage Register
- Official name: Fairwater
- Type: State heritage (complex / group)
- Designated: 27 March 2000
- Reference no.: 1381
- Type: House
- Category: Residential buildings (private)
- Builders: Post 1910 alterations undertaken by Stuart Bros.

Fairwater is a heritage-listed residence and homestead at 560 New South Head Road, Double Bay, Sydney, Australia. It was designed by John Horbury Hunt (1882) and J. W. Manson (c. 1910–11) and built from 1882 to 1970. Acquired by members of the Fairfax family in late 1900, following the 2017 death of Lady Mary Fairfax, the house is managed by the executors of her estate. It was added to the New South Wales State Heritage Register on 27 March 2000.

In the media, the location of Fairwater is often incorrectly reported as the suburb of Point Piper.

== History ==
A Crown grant was part of Captain John Piper's 77 hectares (190 acres) Point Piper Estate officially granted in 1820. This grant was subsequently acquired by Daniel Cooper and Solomon Levy in 1830. The subdivision of this part of Cooper's estate, known as the Point Piper Estate, commenced in the mid-1850s.

The first leasehold title to the allotment, which was to become Fairwater, was made in January 1863 to Edwin Thomas Beilby. Beilby (c. 1822-1906) was a businessman associated with many of the prominent Sydney financial institutions of the nineteenth century. The leasehold title was for a period of 99 years 9 months, of an area of 2 acres 13 perches, with an annual rental set at A£52 for the duration of the lease. During the mid-1870s Beilby was bankrupted, and in June 1875 Beilby's official assignee, F. T. Humphreys, sold the allotment through the auction house of L. E. Threlkeld.

=== Joseph family ownership ===
The purchaser of the leasehold allotment was James White of Cranbrook. White (1828–1890) was a member of the pioneering Hunter Valley family of pastoralists. After a short period as a member of the New South Wales Legislative Assembly between 1864 and 1868, in 1873 White bought Cranbrook (which was built for Robert Tooth in 1859), directly opposite Fairwater. In March 1882, Francis Edward Joseph purchased the leasehold title from James White for the sum of A£500 (plus the annual rental of A£52). Joseph (1858–?) was the only son of Samuel Aaron Joseph (1824–1898), MLA and MLC. Joseph is generally referred to as a stockbroker by profession. Joseph adopted his wife's family name (Carnegy) in 1915 on inheriting the feudal barony of Lour in Angus, Scotland.

Fairwater was constructed for Joseph in 1882 to a design by arguably the most original architect to practice in Australia in the last quarter of the nineteenth century – John Horbury Hunt (1838–1904). Hunt was a Canadian born architect who arrived in Sydney in 1863. Closely affiliated with the Bishop of Armidale and Grafton, and the White family of pastoralists, Hunt's work is particularly evident in New England and the Hunter Valley.

The Josephs resided at the house, which was called Fairwater from c. 1884, for the period 1883 and 1887. During 1888 to 1889 the property was leased to Thomas Forster Knox (1849–1919), son of Sir Edward Knox, the founder of the Colonial Sugar Refining Co., and later chairman of this company. The Josephs returned to occupy the house in 1890 and continued to reside there for most of that decade up to 1897 when the house was again tenanted, initially in 1897 by Thomas Buckland (the son of the merchant, pastoralist, and banker – Thomas Buckland), and then by the Royal Navy for the years 1899 and 1901.

=== Fairfax family ownership ===
The Fairfax family ownership of Fairwater commenced in late 1900 with the assignment of the leasehold of 2 acres and 13 perches to James Oswald Fairfax. The purchase price of the leasehold title was A£5,350. James Oswald Fairfax (1863–1928) was the third son of the proprietor of the Sydney Morning Herald, Sir James Reading Fairfax (1834–1919), and grandson of the founder of that newspaper – John Fairfax (1804–1877). In March 1909 J. O. Fairfax bought out the leasehold title to the 2 acres 13 perches from the Cooper family. Following the acquisition of freehold title Fairfax engaged the Sydney architect John Williamson Manson of Manson and Pickering to further remodel the Hunt house, with alterations being undertaken sometime after 1910. Manson (c. 1863-1922) was Scottish born and trained in Glasgow in the office of Alexander Thomson (1817–1875). He arrived in Sydney in the mid-1880s. George A. Taylor's (the publisher of Building) obituary of Manson stated that "he was one of the greatest architects of our time".

After the death of Sir James Oswald Fairfax in 1928, the title to the property was transferred in 1930 to his widow, Lady (Mabel Alice Emmeline) Fairfax (1871–1965), son, Warwick Oswald Fairfax (1901–1987), and brother and power of attorney, Geoffrey Evan Fairfax (1861–1930). Following the death of Lady Fairfax in 1965, the title to the property was transferred to Warwick Oswald Fairfax in August 1966. Warwick and his family moved permanently into Fairwater in late 1968. Warwick Oswald Fairfax (1901–1987) joined staff of the Sydney Morning Herald in 1927, and was appointed director in 1927. Following the death of his father in 1928, Warwick was appointed managing director and chairman of directors in 1930. Following the incorporation of John Fairfax Limited. in 1956 he was appointed chairman, a position he retained until 1977. He was knighted in 1967.

Following the death of Sir Warwick in 1987, the house was lived in by his widow, Lady Mary Fairfax. Also in 1987 their son, Warwick Fairfax privatised the publicly listed media company, only for it to collapse (in a major stockmarket downturn) three years later. Lady Mary Fairfax (née Marie Wein, 1922–2017) established the Australian Opera Auditions in 1964, in cooperation with the Metropolitan Opera in New York. This was the first of a string of charitable organisations connected with the arts which she joined or initiated. She had lived at Fairwater since 1968, where she conducted a salon where guests were able to admire the art works of Rodin, Epstein, Dobell and Degas. Among those she entertained were dancer Rudolf Nureyev, politician Pierre Trudeau, actor Phyllis Diller, entertainer Liberace, actor Glenda Jackson, Emilio Pucci and Imelda Marcos, first lady of the Philippines. The Sydney Swans were launched at Fairwater. In 1973 it was the scene of a ball for 1000 to celebrate the opening of Sydney Opera House. Another famous party at the house was the Concourse of Canine Elegance. Lady Fairfax was appointed an Officer of the Order of the British Empire (OBE) in 1976, a Member of the Order of Australia (AM) in 1988, and a Companion of the Order of Australia (AC) in 2005, for "service to the community of wide ranging social and economic benefit through support and philanthropy for ongoing medical research initiatives, improved health care opportunities, nurturing artistic talent in young performers, and preservation of diverse cultural heritage". Lady Fairfax was still active socially in the late 1990s. Lady Fairfax had stated publicly that she planned to bequeath Fairwater to the people of NSW when she died. Her death came on 18 September 2017, aged 95. For nearly 60 years, Lady Fairfax had an impact on the social, artistic, philanthropic, political and cultural life of not just Sydney, but the entire country. Since she became media scion Warwick Fairfax's third wife in 1959, Lady Fairfax had assumed the position of First Lady of a John Fairfax & Sons, which published prestigious newspapers including the Sydney Morning Herald, The Age and Australian Financial Review, as well as a vast network of magazines, radio and television stations.

Under the publicly released terms of Lady Fairfax's will, all live-in staff members employed by Lady Mary at the time of her death can continue to live-in at Fairwater.

=== Cannon-Brookes family ownership ===
In September 2018, Fairwater was sold for about $100 million to Mike Cannon-Brookes and his wife Annie Cannon-Brookes, making it the most expensive house in Australia.

== Description ==
Fairwater is set on 8,000 square metres (86,000 sq ft) facing Sydney Harbour and in 2017 had an estimated value of approximately A$100 million.

=== Property, grounds and stables ===
The retaining walls are of rubble construction with no mortar in the bedding joints. The stone is sandstone, probably local. The front (carriage) drive is surfaced in asphalt with brick edging. The brick edging is contemporary with the retaining walls.

The grounds are in a formal garden style with extensive lawns towards the harbour and a number of mature specimens of native and exotic trees such as a bunya pine (Araucaria bidwillii), Port Jackson figs (Ficus rubiginosa), silky oaks (Grevillea robusta), camphor laurels (Cinnamomum camphora) and jacarandas (J.mimosifolia), which are indicative of earlier phases of occupation from, conceivably, the 1870s. The property contains a specimen of twin-trunked bunya pine and an unusually large Southern/evergreen magnolia in the lower rear garden to the beach. The front garden and driveway is a private glen of trees of massive proportions and scale. This area is dominated by the camphor laurels in the central turning area to the residence, while the upper area to the front property boundary is dominated by large Port Jackson figs with massive coalesced aerial roots and extensive buttressing. The canopies of these trees extend to the carriageway. The intertwined and entangled canopies of all these trees form a closed and wild woodland garden designed for aesthetic appeal. In addition, this canopy is topped by two very tall emergent silky oaks which are amongst the largest in the municipality. These trees are native to the subtropical rainforests of northern NSW and south-eastern Queensland. Another specimen of this species of similar age and structure is located in the neighbouring property of 574 New South Head Road. All these trees are typical of plantings in the 19th and early 20th centuries. Their size and scale lend themselves to grand landscape schemes appropriate for early large estates. The lush green foliage of the trees continues a general theme throughout the Harbourside suburbs. Moreover, the large neighbouring estate of Elaine 550 New South Head Road and the neighbouring Council Chambers/Blackburn Gardens (former 'Redleaf') property have collections of historic species that support this planting theme.

==== Summary of listed trees ====
The 1991 Woollahra Significant Tree Register lists the following trees located on Fairwater:

- 1 bunya pine (Araucaria bidwillii)
- 3 camphor laurels (Cinnamommum camphora)
- 2 Port Jackson figs (Ficus rubiginosa)
- 2 silky oaks (Grevillea robusta)
- 1 Magnolia grandiflora.

Trees located at Fairwater listed on the 1991 Woollahra Significant Tree Register
Botanical name	Common name	Significance attributes	Origin	Location	Height (approx.)		Canopy spread (approx.)		Trunk diameter (approx.)		Estimated age	Condition/ health	Notes
Botanical name	Common name	Significance attributes	Origin	Location	m	ft	m	ft	m	ft	Estimated age	Condition/ health	Notes
Araucaria bidwillii	Bunya pine	Component of Mixed Informal Group, Historic, Visual Dominance (Harbour/ District/ Local)	Ornamental/ Cultivated	Located near the eastern boundary of the lower lawn terrace of the rear northern garden property boundary with Carthona.	22	72	10	33	1.2	3.9	100+ years	Very good condition and health	
Cinnamommum camphora	Camphor Laurel	Informal Group, Historic, Visual Dominance (District/ Local)	Ornamental/ Cultivated	Located in the front southern garden, main central vehicular turning area and entry to the residence.	26	85	25	82	1.5–2	4.9–6.6	100+ years	Generally very good condition and health. One tree has been severely lopped	
Grevillea robusta	Silky Oak	Two Specimens, Historic, Visual Dominance (Harbour/ District/ Local)	Ornamental/ Cultivated	Located within the densely wooded front southern garden and approximately 3–5 metres (9.8–16.4 ft) below carriageway level.	25	82	12–15	39–49	0.9–1.0	3.0–3.3	100+ years	The smaller specimen is in very good condition with a dense canopy. The larger specimen has a damaged crown, possibly from the effect of storms and in need of tree surgery.	
Ficus rubiginosa	Port Jackson fig	Two Specimens Component of Mixed Informal Group, Historic, Visua Dominance (District/ Local)	Ornamental/ Cultivated	Both specimens located in front southern garden, 3–5 metres (9.8–16.4 ft) below carriageway level.	16	52	25	82	1.0–1.5	3.3–4.9	100+ years	Both specimens in very good condition and health. The larger specimen has received major pruning to the crown.	

=== Stables ===
The stable is of brick construction with a timber-framed gable roof. The bricks used in the construction, being a dark red, are different in colour to that found in the main house.

=== House ===
The residence is a double storey structure of brick construction with a timber-framed roof originally constructed in 1882 with additions c. 1901, and in particular from 1910s. The exterior appearance is characterised by the use of a brick, which is pale yellow in colour. The roof is covered in slate tiles. Additions made c. 1910–11 often include the use of sandstone (i.e. in the verandah and carriage porch) which is very reddish in colour.

The windows throughout are timber framed, being either single or double hung sashes, with some casement windows. Most windows are fitted with a set of timber louvred shutters. The window glazing, in addition to the predominant use of clear glazing, also includes diamond patterned leadlight, and stained glass.

The roof is a series of timbered gables with battened ends and pebble dash finish. These gables are the work of Manson and Pickering, architects, c. 1910–11 and are in the Federation Arts and Crafts style embellishing Hunt's simple form by a series of projecting bay windows, and balconies. The south elevation fronting New South Head Road includes a rusticated large sandstone carriage porch, and the north elevation fronting Double Bay has a wide verandah with a colonnade of sandstone columns in the Doric order. Manson and Pickering added both of these features in c. 1910–11.

The interior of the house is characterised both by the need to provide service and living wings, and the fact that the house is principally a conglomeration of the work of two architects – John Horbury Hunt and Manson and Pickering. The lower floor is a suite of living and service rooms, and the upper for the living and bathrooms for both staff and occupants. Individual elements of note are the stained glass picture windows of 1882, chimney-pieces, door furniture, a painted ceiling of 1882, and mosaic floor of 1882.

=== Condition ===
As at 24 December 2013, the physical condition was excellent. The archaeological potential is medium. Of high integrity in view of the retention to date of the original leasehold (made in 1863) allotment size. Of high integrity in view of the continuation of the historical use of the house with principal and staff quarters. Of high integrity as a large family residence which at its core is John Horbury Hunt's simple, but avant-garde design, embellished by the Manson and Pickering alterations.

=== Modifications and dates ===
- Addition of the library and relocation of the stair hall, c. 1900s.
- Construction of stable, c. 1900s.
- Additions of the ground floor drawing room, port-cochere, verandah on harbour side, and an upstairs sitting room, c. 1910–11. Manson and Pickering, architects.
- Alterations to the upper floor of the servant's wing, 1924. Weston and Hoare, architects.
- Additional verandah on the second floor on the elevation fronting Double Bay. 1926. Stuart Bros. builders.
- Construction of garage, and alteration to stable. 1930. Neave and Berry, architects.
- Additional first floor bathroom off main bedroom and sitting room. 1936. Stacey A. Neave, architect.
- Alteration to the window of the library. 1952. Stuart Bros., builders.
- Alterations to upgrade bathroom fittings, staff quarters, etc., c. 1966.
- Construction of swimming pool and reinforced concrete retaining wall, 1970.

=== Further information ===
Land title is in one lot, and closely approximates original leasehold title issued in 1863, with additions made in 1924 and 1936. Land title is inclusive of Seven Shillings Beach. Listing should exclude swimming pool and associated reinforced concrete wall.

== Heritage listing ==
As at 8 June 2006, Fairwater, is a large domestic residence constructed in 1882 with additions made in c. 1901 and 1910, with former stable (c. 1900s) and garage (1930), situated on a large suburban allotment fronting Port Jackson with mature garden landscaping including notable trees. The property is of rare historic, aesthetic, social and scientific significance in consideration of its continuing association with the Fairfax family, and as a large late-nineteenth century residence (with Edwardian era additions), of high integrity, designed by John Horbury Hunt.

Fairwater was listed on the New South Wales State Heritage Register on 27 March 2000 having satisfied the following criteria.

The place is important in demonstrating the course, or pattern, of cultural or natural history in New South Wales.

Fairwater is of historical significance in consideration of its long association with the Australian publishing family company founded by John Fairfax in 1841, whose descendants have lived in the house since c. 1901 to the present. It is also historically significant for it association with the Joseph family of merchants who built the house in 1882, and the architect they employed to build it – John Horbury Hunt.

The place is important in demonstrating aesthetic characteristics and/or a high degree of creative or technical achievement in New South Wales.

Aesthetically, Fairwater is a rare example of the combined works of John Horbury Hunt and James Williamson Manson, the architect who sympathetically enlarged the Hunt era house to a form that is basically seen today. The exterior includes examples of face brick work with rusticated sandstone details, while the interior retains period finishes and fittings such as stained glass picture windows, painted ceiling, decorative mosaic floor, door leafs and door furniture, panelled walls, and chimney-pieces which are now rare in consideration of their integrity and quality. The grounds contain an extensive system of sandstone retaining walls which is significant in consideration of its age and rarity, and a number of mature trees (such as a bunya pine, Port Jackson figs, Silky Oaks, Camphor Laurels, and Jacarandas), dating, in part from the initial European improvement of the area following subdivision.

The place has a strong or special association with a particular community or cultural group in New South Wales for social, cultural or spiritual reasons.

Fairwater has social value in that it is recognised by the community as a place of high historic interest in consideration of its association with the Fairfax family, and as a place which demonstrates through its siting, scale and quality, a style of living of the upper middle classes which has now largely vanished.

The place has potential to yield information that will contribute to an understanding of the cultural or natural history of New South Wales.

Fairwater has research value as a rare example of a large Victorian/Edwardian domestic residence and grounds, which retain a high degree of integrity in both its individual components and planning.

The place possesses uncommon, rare or endangered aspects of the cultural or natural history of New South Wales.

The association between Fairwater and the Fairfax family in view of the longevity of ownership and occupation by two generations, Sir James Oswald Fairfax (1863–1928) and Sir Warwick Oswald Fairfax (1901–1987), of managing directors of this family publishing company. The association between Fairwater and the Joseph family in view of the family's notable commercial and political achievements. The association between Fairwater and the retention of a land title boundary, which fronts Port Jackson. The location of Fairwater within an area of heritage items and its contribution to this waterfront precinct of high aesthetic value. The location of Fairwater on the foreshore of Double Bay in consideration of the views of Port Jackson.

The hard landscaping feature of the stone retaining walls being both part of the earlier build of the house and as an element which set the garden and house within the land allotment. The plantings within a large land holding situated on the foreshore of Port Jackson.

The place is important in demonstrating the principal characteristics of a class of cultural or natural places/environments in New South Wales.

The association between Fairwater and J. W. Manson in view of the house being one of a number of new buildings undertaken by Manson and Pickering in the local area during the period c. 1900-1912.

== See also ==
- Australian residential architectural styles
