= Orielton =

Orielton may refer to:

- Orielton, Harrington Park, New South Wales, Australia, a historic house
- Orielton Homestead, estate in the Macarthur Region of Sydney, New South Wales, Australia
- Orielton Lagoon, in Tasmania, Australia
- Orielton, Pembrokeshire, a historic house in Wales, the location of the Orielton Field Studies Centre
- Orielton, Tasmania, Australia
