= Ruth Fairfax House =

- Location within Queensland Location within Australia
- 18.6468°S 146.1636°E
- Location: 5 Lynch Street, Ingham, Shire of Hinchinbrook, Queensland, Australia

History
- Design period: 1870s–1890s (late 19th century)
- Built: 1887–1962

Queensland Heritage Register
- Official name: 5 Lynch Street, Ruth Fairfax House
- Type: state heritage (built)
- Designated: 12 December 2003
- Reference no.: 602193
- Significant period: 1887 (fabric, historical); 1962 (fabric, historical)
- Significant components: bathroom/bathhouse, garage, pavilion, kitchen/kitchen house, shed/s, residential accommodation – main house

The Ruth Fairfax House is a heritage-listed detached house at 5 Lynch Street, Ingham, Shire of Hinchinbrook, Queensland, Australia. It was built from 1887 to 1962. It was added to the Queensland Heritage Register on 12 December 2003.

== History ==
The Ruth Fairfax House is a single-storey timber framed residence with tile roof imported from Japan by Judge George William Paul and erected on a suburban allotment at the corner of Langshaw Street and Bowen Terrace in New Farm in 1887. It was sold at auction in 1962, dismantled and transported to Ingham and re-erected at its current address in Lynch Street. It is the first known residence of its type to be imported from Japan.

The Brisbane suburb of New Farm has played an important part in Brisbane's history since early settlement, providing land for both farming and recreational activities. Its development as a residential area was a little slower, despite Fortitude Valley's earlier establishment. While houses began to appear on the peninsula in the 1860s, it wasn't until the 1880s boom economy that the area between Brunswick Street and the river began to develop solidly with many of Brisbane's most prominent citizens choosing to live there.

It was into this increasingly wealthier residential area that Judge GW Paul, the then Southern District Court Judge, chose to build his Japanese house in 1887. The house was fully manufactured in Japan, and imported into Brisbane, along with Japanese labour – three carpenters and two plasterers – who travelled from Kobe to construct the house, under the guidance of an English supervisor. The house was the first known piece of authentic Japanese architecture in Australia. Japan had been open to full trade with the West for less than twenty years and its influence at the time on Western culture was confined principally to Japanese furniture and interior elements, which had begun to appear in European houses some time earlier.

George William Paul was born in Penrith, New South Wales on 2 June 1839, the son of George William Paul and his wife Sarah Jane (née Dalton). He became a member of the English Bar in 1861. He returned to Australia in 1863 and worked in private practice in the new colony of Queensland for some years until being appointed Crown Prosecutor. He went on to become a judge of the District Court in 1871 and was described in his obituary as one of the finest criminal barristers in Brisbane as well as having spent regular intervals on the bench of the Supreme Court.

Judge Paul travelled to Japan in 1886. The house he imported was a copy of the house he stayed in at Kobe during his few months in Japan. Its suitability for the Brisbane climate was allegedly one of the criteria by which Judge Paul chose to bring the house to Brisbane. The house, constructed on a sloping site at the corner of Langshaw Street and Bowen Terrace at New Farm, was reported in the Brisbane Courier on 21 December 1887 in an extensive and highly favourable article. It was also covered in a later issue of The Boomerang with illustrations by GHM Addison. Few Queenslanders, apart from merchant seamen, would have visited Japan at this early time and even fewer would have thought to attempt something such as importing a whole Japanese building. Together with the house, Judge Paul had also brought back with him from Japan, an extensive collection of ceramics and other art treasures.

The house, named Yeddo, was fully manufactured in Kobe, somewhat larger than standard, and was test assembled there before its export. There is some supposition that the house was imported as a speculative venture and its failure to sell prevented a wider trade.

The house was an elevated timber post and beam construction and built on a 6-foot (1.8 m) grid with some plaster infill and a heavy tiled roof after the shoin style. This style of Japanese house remains the one with which most non-Japanese associate Japan, that is, wood framed with paper sliding doors. The shoin style refers to a small elevated bay or box window derived from a type of study alcove (shoin) popular in early Buddhist ecclesiastical communities as early as the 12th century. These study places became a status symbol and feature in the main guestroom of official residences between the 16th and 18th centuries. Other elements that combine to produce the shoin style are the tokonoma and tana.

The tokonoma, an interior focal point, derives from the private altar in a priest's home, which was originally a low wooden table on which incense was burnt, flowers were placed and above which scrolls were hung. In shoin style this became a built-in alcove often coupled with the tana - originally freestanding scroll racks that became a built in shelving system. These three elements are combined in the house's central room to produce the shoin style.

Like typical Japanese houses, Ruth Fairfax House's walls consisted of movable shoji (wood and translucent paper screens to filter the light between the exterior and interior) and fusuma (heavier paper mache partitions between interior spaces to provide privacy). The only fixed walls were around the kitchen, bathroom and tokonamas. These walls, presumably for bracing were made from a plaster on lathe. Heavy timber storm shutters or amado ran around the verandah and effectively formed another layer of enclosure. These could be slid away or removed entirely storing neatly away in the amaboko at the end of each run. At the New Farm site, the kitchen was detached off a servery via the dining room. A bathroom and teahouse were also located in the grounds.

All materials were imported except the plaster and mortar which were mixed to Japanese specifications. The roofing tiles were dark blue- grey, shaped like the English pan-tile. The ridge and hip closers were decorated with the Buddhist chyrsanthemum symbol in high relief.

The house at New Farm covered about 30 squares, including a 6-foot (1.8 m) wide verandah all round. It had four main rooms (which could be subdivided to make eight) and three tokonomas and chigai-tanas. There was an akari shoji (moon window) made by exposing the bamboo frame of a plaster wall in the suki-ya tradition. The shelves of the chigai-tana were meticulously veneered to avoid exposing end grain. The corner posts and beams of the tokonomas had been chosen from cherrywood, hokki pine or bamboo samples. There were few hand wrought iron nails in the house as most of the joints were mortised and tenoned and secured with wooden pegs.

The jointing of the roofing timbers were intricately detailed. The roof was of traditional construction with two beams 24" by 10" in section used for strutting the rafters and hanging the ceiling. The tiles were set in a mud-like mortar on a thin timber decking. The ceiling also was made from this thin timber veneer like plywood. In spite of the houses' flexibility the subtle modular and the fine workmanship, the roof was heavy and complicated.

The Tokyo modular system appeared to have been used. Horizontal distances measured between column centers were in multiples of 3 feet (0.91 m). Vertical distances were floor to mid-transom, 6 feet 6 inches (1.98 m) and thence to the ceiling, the width of one and a half mats with a ceiling height of 11 feet (3.4 m). The timber floor had been made from the packing cases in which the house was shipped instead of the usual tatami - the boards were 1.5 inches (38 mm) thick and 15 inches (380 mm) wide and beautifully laid. It was not sunk for tatami matting - only 0.75 inches (19 mm) as if for carpeting. The module was broken only by two internal passages, each 3 feet (0.91 m) clear. This must have been a stipulation of the owners as these are not likely to have existed in a Japanese house.

Judge Paul lived in the house until his death in 1909 after which the Public Trustee sold the house to John Cockburn in November 1910. In 1927 it was purchased by George Maxted, a Brisbane bookmaker. It was sold again in October 1947 to the Queensland Country Women's Association (CWA) to be used as their Brisbane headquarter (their headquarters previously were in Toowoomba). Following the death of Ruth Fairfax, the first Queensland President of the CWA, on 1 February 1948, when the CWA officially opened their new office on 10 February 1948, they named the building Ruth Fairfax House in her memory. The house was used as their headquarters until 1960 when they moved to premises in Gregory Terrace. Changes that had been made to the house by this time included cutting off some of the original posts below floor joint level and replacing with brick piers, painting external wood work in cream and dark brown, varnishing sand staining internal woodwork and adding electricity and plumbing.

In March 1962, the house was sold to a developer who offered the house at demolition value to the Brisbane City Council, University of Queensland and the National Trust. Time constraints and lack of finances prevented the offer being taken up.

The house was purchased at auction for £600 by Dr Pam Markwell, through her sister, acting as agent. With only thirty days for the house to be taken apart for transportation to Ingham, the Markwells enlisted the help of William Carr of the University of Queensland's architecture department, who, with some of his students, recorded the demolition and dismantling for later erection of the building in Ingham. The Markwells then transported the materials 1,000 miles (1,600 km) north to be rebuilt with local labour.

Some of the timber framework, ranma and a decorative frieze went missing during the trip north. The ceiling and some of the lath and plaster wall panels also did not survive the trip. A number of roof tiles were broken when being unloaded in Ingham. The meticulous mortise and tenon jointing was broken to allow for the removal of the frame and few if any mortice and tenon joints survive. Nails were used in the reassembly.

The house is now re-erected in Ingham. Modern materials have been used to replace those lost in transit or broken during demolition or delivery. The new owners sanded down the timber to its original state.

== Description ==
Ruth Fairfax House is located on a flat site at 5 Lynch Street, Ingham opposite the railway line. It is located close to the front and southern boundaries which are formed by high concrete block screen walls covered in a thick hedge that provides privacy to the verandahs when the amado are open. To the north a carport abuts the house adjacent to the projecting gable over the entry. Behind the house, a smaller detached single storey timber lined and clad building houses a living area and the kitchen. A garden shed and large bush house occupy most of the remainder of the rear of the site.

The main portion of the house was rebuilt on a concrete slab. The encircling verandahs supported on stumps have a timber floor of boards, 375 millimetres (14.8 in) wide. Part of the verandah was not constructed where the house came in close proximity to the building already located on the site and a portion of the verandah roof at the rear is sheeted with corrugated iron as there were insufficient tiles that survived the removal to Ingham.

There is some supposition about the accuracy of the relocation of walls and it is possible a secondary hallway was created between the rear bedrooms. The bathroom has been converted into storage and two sleeping apartments were adapted for the bathroom.

Nails have been used in the re-erection of the framework. Most of the screens survive, although little if any remains of the original paper on the shoji screens. Some of the papier mache on the fusuma screens survives the screens as do most of the ranma, the moon window, the tokonomas and the tanas. The ceiling has been replaced with ply sheeting.

== Glossary ==
Amado: Heavy wooden storm doors on the exterior of the house that slide away during day time to allow light and air into the interior

Fusuma: Heavier sliding doors made from opaque paper on a wooden frame – used as room separators often decorated with seasonal scenes.

Nageshi: Wooden runners in which sliding doors run.

Ranma: Fretwork panels which sit above the door lintels and allow air to circulate through the house.

Shoin: An elevated and slightly projecting alcove which developed from Buddhist study alcoves. It was adopted by the upper classes and became attached to the tokonoma.

Shoji: Translucent paper sliding screens used on the outer edges of room. Allow a diffuse light to enter – easily removed.

Tana: Decorative shelving which like a soin window adjoins the tokonoma.

Tatami: Standard floor mat, made from rice straw, which is the basic size module for all Japanese rooms. It is approximately 910x1820.

Tokonoma: A wall recess which is used for displaying art or flower arrangement and is regarded as the focal point of a Japanese room.

== Heritage listing ==
Ruth Fairfax House was listed on the Queensland Heritage Register on 12 December 2003 having satisfied the following criteria.

The place is important in demonstrating the evolution or pattern of Queensland's history.

Built in New Farm in 1887 and transported and re-erected in Ingham in 1962, the house is important as the first known and one of few imported Japanese houses to Australia. The story of the house is important in demonstrating the pattern of Queensland's history. It provides evidence of late nineteenth century society's attitudes and interest in other cultures.

The place demonstrates rare, uncommon or endangered aspects of Queensland's cultural heritage.

As a fully imported Japanese house, although relocated and altered, it demonstrates a rare building type in Australia and displays the principal characteristics of a Japanese House in the shoin style.

The place is important in demonstrating the principal characteristics of a particular class of cultural places.

Many of its characteristics are directly comparable with the typical Queensland house of the period.

The place is important because of its aesthetic significance.

The detailing of the house from its heavy decorated roof tiles to its light and intricately detailed paper screens, its wide floor boards, its screening systems and its solutions to controlling its environment has aesthetic significance that varies from the Queensland house of the period.

The place has a special association with the life or work of a particular person, group or organisation of importance in Queensland's history.

The House is also important for its association with its owner, Judge GW Paul, who had the prescience to import the house from Japan, something that had not been previously attempted from a country that had only recently been opened to full trade with the West.
