= David Wilson (barrister) =

Australian barrister (1879–1965)

David Wilson KC
- Born: 26 December 1879; Sydney, New South Wales
- Died: 6 January 1965 (aged 85); Darlinghurst, New South Wales
- Education: Newington College
- Alma mater: University of Sydney
- Occupations: Barrister; King's Counsel; Company Director
- Board member of: Colonial Sugar Refining Company; NSW Board of The Trustees Executors and Agency Company
- Spouse: Marcia (née Budge)
- Children: Marcie Elizabeth Wilson
- Parents: William Joshua Wilson (father); Jessie Elizabeth (née Shepherd) (mother)
- Relatives: William Hardy Wilson (brother)

David Wilson KC (26 December 1879 – 6 January 1965) was an Australian barrister, King's Counsel and company director. He was the owner of the rural property Tocal Homestead at Tocal, New South Wales and a furniture maker of distinction.

== Early life ==
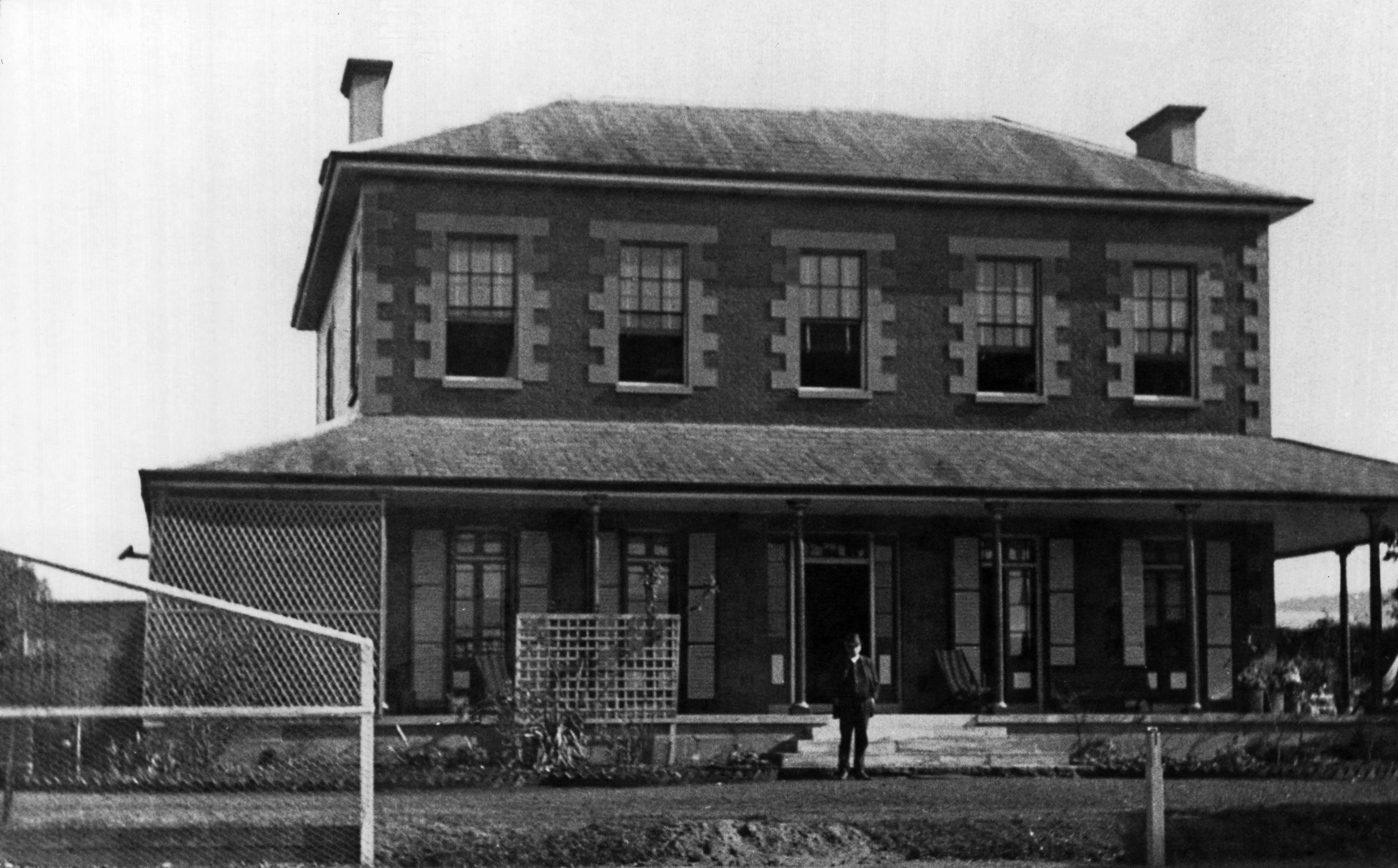
Wilson owned the rural property and homestead Tocal from birth 1879 until 1907

Wilson was born in Sydney, the first of four sons of William Joshua Wilson (1843–1899) and Jessie Elizabeth (née Shepherd). On his birth Wilson was a child of independent means as in 1865 his grandfather, Felix Wilson, had died and willed by entail Tocal to his unborn grandson. His younger brothers were William Hardy Wilson (1881–1955), Lindsay Wilson (born 1883–1959) and Robert Shepherd Wilson (1886–1954). He was educated at Newington College commencing in 1891 and sat and passed the Junior Examination in 1895 and the Senior in 1897. In both exams he was awarded the medal for best pass in the state in English. In 1896 he won one of four Wigram Allen Scholarships, endowed by Sir George Wigram Allen. He was a Prefect in 1896 and 1897, a member of the 1st XI cricket in the same years, and a member of the rifle shooting team in 1897. Wilson went up to the University of Sydney in 1898 and graduated B.A. in 1901 and M.A. in 1903 and gained his LL.B. degree in 1906. In 1907, while studying abroad, Wilson sold Tocal and decided to pursue a career in the law.

== Residences ==
- Ellalong, Holden Street, Ashfield: the Wilson family lived at this home during his school years.
- Llanthas, 3 Emu Street, Burwood: following the death of William Joshua Wilson in 1899, his widow and children moved to Strathfield and David Wilson was married from here in 1906. Llanthes is still extant but after subdivision and a border change is now located at 25A Wonga Street, Strathfield.
- Marburg, 9 Jersey Road, Strathfield: Wilson and his new bride lived in Strathfield from the time of their marriage until moving to Bellevue Hill. Marburg has since been demolished.
- Yandooya, Cranbrook Road, Bellevue Hill: This house was built in 1912 to a design by the architectural firm of Manson and Pickering and the Wilsons moved there in 1919. It had extensive grounds running between Cranbrook Road and Cranbrook Lane. Wilson sold the property to The Scots College in 1943. It became a boarding facility, Royle House, but was demolished in 1981.
- The Astor, Macquarie Street, Sydney: In 1943 Wilson moved into the 1923 Chicago-inspired steel and concrete apartment block designed by the architects Donald Esplin and Stuart Mill Mould.

== Marriage and family ==
On 10 April 1906, Wilson married Marcia, daughter of Alex Budge of Rathgael, Croydon. Their only daughter, Marcie Elizabeth Wilson (1907–1995), known as Betty, married Warwick Oswald Fairfax (1901–1987) in 1928 and had issue: Caroline Simpson (1930–2003) and James Fairfax (1933-2017). After divorcing Fairfax, Betty married Commandant Pierre Gilly in 1946 and had one son, Edward Gilly (1948–2005). Following her second divorce, Betty returned to being known as Betty Fairfax and, with her three children, remained close to David Wilson.

== Legal career ==
Following graduation, Wilson was admitted to the Bar of New South Wales in 1906. He took silk in 1946 after many years of distinguished equity practice in Sydney.

== Company director ==
In 1935, Wilson was appointed a director of the Colonial Sugar Refining Company and remained on the board until 1953. He was a member of the New South Wales board of The Trustees Executors and Agency Company from 1947.

== Furniture maker ==
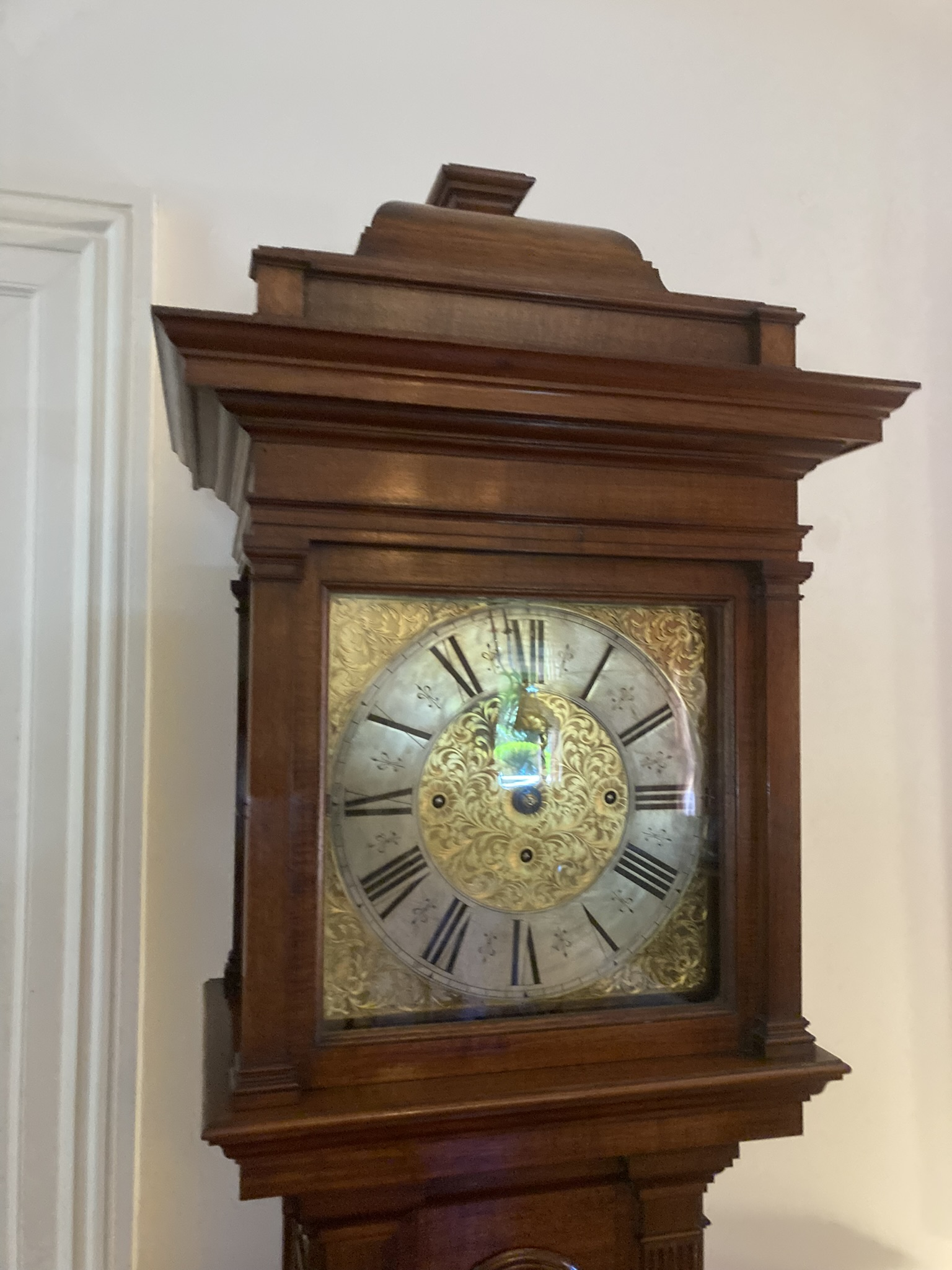
Detail of a long case clock by Wilson

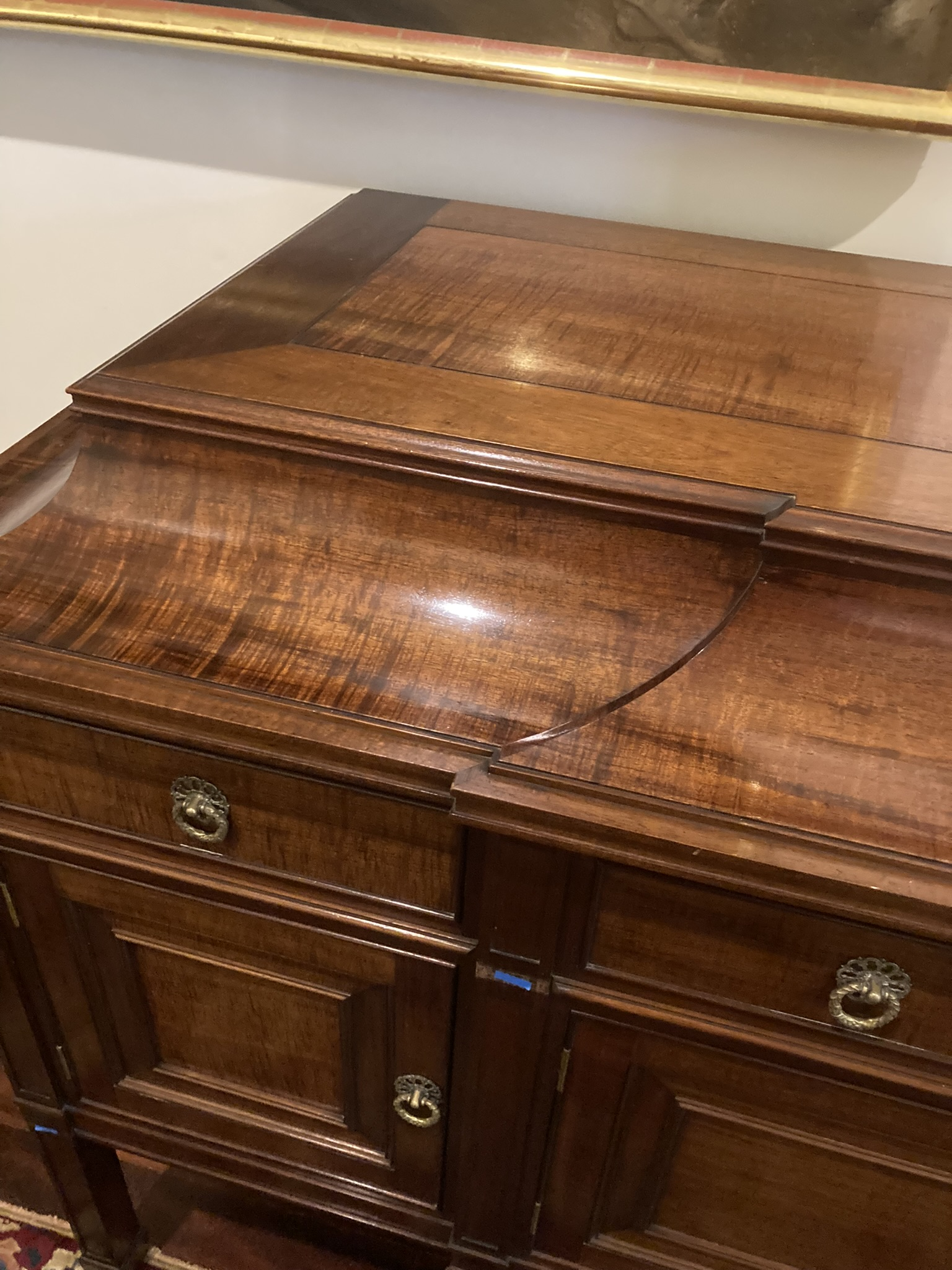
Detail of a chiffonier by Wilson

At the age of 35, Wilson suffered from a mysterious and severe throat condition. His medical advisors told him not to speak for six months and to wrap a handkerchief over his mouth. To occupy himself during this period while not working, Wilson took to making furniture. The furniture made was to designs of his brother Hardy Wilson and many of the working drawings are held by the National Library of Australia. His throat recovered fully but he continued to make furniture having taken lessons from a carpenter and found a new hobby. Twenty pieces of his furniture were made between 1914 and 1925, and are all held in private family collections or by National Trust of Australia in NSW. The June 1926 issue of Art in Australia illustrates five examples of his work and nine photographs and measurements are held by the National Library. Wilson, and his brother, decided that all pieces would be made in solid Australian timbers and not to use veneers.
