= Orielton Homestead =

The Orielton Homestead is an estate in the Macarthur Region of Sydney, New South Wales, Australia. It is located on the grounds of Harrington Grove, which is part of the Harrington Park estate.

Orielton was restored as the focus of a three-year plan by Harrington Estates, who was developing the surrounding suburbs on behalf of the trust of Mary Fairfax.

== History ==
=== Edward Lord: The First Land Grant (1814–1822) ===
The Orielton Homestead was part of the 1,620 acres of land granted to Edward Lord by Governor Lachlan Macquarie in Macarthur. Lord named his property Orielton after the Orielton estate in Pembroke, Wales, which the Lord family had previously inherited.

Lord traveled to Australia as an officer in the Royal Navy in 1803, and was part of the first contingent to establish a settlement of the Derwent, Van Dieman's Land (now called Tasmania).

Lord built the first primitive hut on the Orielton Homestead but never lived there.

=== John Dickson (1822–1841) ===
In 1813, Scottish industrialist John Dickson arrived in the colonies for his promise to set up the first steam mill in Sydney. Macquarie was ordered by British authorities to grant Dickson land in both town and country. His country land grant was in the Bringelly region. Over time, Dickson increased his land holdings to 17,000 acres in the Cowpastures. In 1822 he bought Orielton.

Dickson owned the only steam mill in Sydney for nearly a decade. The growing population in the early 1820s meant that milling was highly profitable.

Dickson never lived at Orielton, but he built the original four-room cottage homestead that was used as an outstation for farm managers who yielded crops and hay from the area. The residence was positioned below the ridgeline to protect it from the wind and with the perfect vantage point over the plains to oversee production.

=== John & Susannah Perry (1847–1861) ===
Orielton had a series of absent landowners until John Perry, a Camden-based miller and confectioner, and his wife, Susannah, bought the property. Upon their arrival at Orielton, Perry and his wife had eight children: five girls and three boys. However, there was a series of deaths in his family over a four-year period, including the death of his wife Susannah in 1857.

Perry's contribution to the Orielton Homestead was to convert the small farming outstation into a family home. He used the existing Dickson buildings and, over many years, embellished and improved the homestead with eight rooms, wide verandahs, kitchens, servants' rooms, dairy, and stores.

=== William George Peisley (late 1860s-1876) ===
Bill Peisley, a Parramatta butcher and money lender, son of convict John Peisley, was associated with Orielton Park as early as February 1866 when the property was advertised "To Let, or for Sale" with enquiries to be directed to Mr William Peisley, Esq., Woolloomooloo. Bill later owned Orielton Park, where he and his son William Henry Peisley bred prize cattle. In 1873 they sold the Steam Mill machinery and in 1876 sold Orielton Park to Harriet Beard for £4,000 as well as selling her their stock.

=== Harriet Beard (1876–1912) ===
Harriet Beard is long credited as the visionary of Orielton who created and extended the grand house on the hill. She was a wealthy widow who had made her fortune on the goldfields of Hill End when she took ownership of Orielton. In 1871, Beard was recorded to have held a third of the share in three highly lucrative finds.

An investment for that year alone returned nearly £60,000 to Beard. She undertook an extensive scope of work over many years, which doubled the size of the previous homestead to 26 rooms in total, including adding broad wrap-around verandahs, separate servants’ quarters, and bay windows overlooking the grounds.

=== Sir Warwick Fairfax and Lady Mary Fairfax (1944–present) ===
In 1944, John Fairfax & Sons purchased Orielton and Harrington Park. They used the land together for stud Hereford cattle breeding and management. Part of the farm building complex, previously used for dairy farming, was adapted to accommodate the new cattle management. The large barn was demolished due to engineering concerns.

By 1952, the paddocks of Orielton were reorganized to facilitate stud breeding. The paddocks' names had various inspirations, such as "Camp Paddock" referring to the military camp of WWII, the "Oak Paddock" referring to the extensive she-oaks (Allocasuarina), and the "Hill Paddock" referring to the western landmark.

After Warwick Fairfax died in 1987, Mary Fairfax continued to bring communities to the suburbs of Harrington Park and Harrington Grove and restore the grand homes that sat upon the estates.

In 2015, Harrington Estates, developer of Harrington Grove, Harrington Park, and Catherine Park, began to restore Orielton on behalf of Mary Fairfax.

The house was also used by a veterinarian, a goat farmer, and a cult in the 1960s. During World War II, it was used as a military base.

== Restoration ==
The three-year restoration of Orielton Homestead was led by Tropman & Tropman Architects.

== Cultural significance of Orielton ==
The Cowpastures of the Camden area played an essential role in the development of the Sydney Colony. The two bulls and five cows that wandered from Sydney Cove in 1795 and were found thriving seven years later along the Nepean River were significant in the development of early Sydney and New South Wales. Properties such as Orielton continued to build upon the expanding Sydney Colony.

Harrington Estates managed three properties: Orielton, Harrington Park House, and Catherine Park House.

Orielton is considered exceptional because of the integrity of its rural setting and the demonstrable functional relationships within the homestead and farm complex. It is a good representative example of a gentleman's estate from the 1840s, and possibly as early as the 1820s (granted in 1815).

== Bibliography ==
- Casey & Lowe Archaeological Impact Assessment and research design, Orielton Homestead
- Daly, John M & Associates land survey. Lot 41 in DP270613 Orielton Homestead Ref 17100FP 3 May 2015
  Symonds, Earl Army Platoon 1941–1945 – History of 2nd Australian Army Troops Coy RAE AIF http://bsymonds.net/wp-content/uploads/2016/06/Earl-Army-ww2-2nd-AIF-s.pdf
- Ditrich, Julie, Realising the Promise: the story of Harrington Park, Icon Visual Marketing 2007
- Gover, Sheree, Orielton Homestead. A look at the restoration and the stories behind it, Icon Visual Marketing 2018 ISBN 978-0-6484153-0-5
- Hanna, Bronwyn, Regendering the landscape in NSW, Report for the Department of Environment and Conservation, 2011
- Hodge, Brian, The Cornish at Hill End, NSW, An abridged talked give to CANSW Members October 2005
- Tropman & Tropman Architects, Orielton Park Homestead Estate, Conservation Manager Plan. Ref 1321: LCMP September 2017
- Willis, Ian 2016 The army arrives at Narellan Camden History Notes https://camdenhistorynotes.wordpress.com/2016/04/23/thearmy-arrives-at-narellan/
  https://sydneylivingmuseums.com.au/stories/elizabeth-farm-dripstone
  https://collection.maas.museum/object/216906
- Artefact Heritage, The Northern Road upgrade from The Old Northern Rd, Narellan, to Mersey Rd, Bringelly, Non-Aboriginal HeritageAssessment, Report to Roads and Maritime Services, October 2012.
  https://watermarks.orangemuseum.com.au/pages/water_ home/drip.cfm
