= Gina Fairfax =

Australian philanthropist

Gina Fairfax AC
- Born: 1949 or 1950 (age 76–77)
- Occupations: Pastoralist and philanthropist
- Spouse: Tim Fairfax
- Children: 4 daughters
- Awards: Companion of the Order of Australia (2022); Community Philanthropist of the Year (Queensland, 2022)

Gina Madeline Fairfax AC is an Australian philanthropist. She is a member of the Fairfax family, married to Tim Fairfax. Together with her husband, she was a founder and is a trustee of the Tim Fairfax Family Foundation which seeks to provide rural, remote and regional Queenslanders opportunities equal to their metropolitan counterparts.

Tim and Gina Fairfax own cattle properties in Queensland and produce grass-fed beef for the European market.

Fairfax was appointed a Companion of the Order of Australia in the 2022 Queen's Birthday Honours for eminent service to the community through leadership roles in charitable organisations, as an advocate for philanthropy, to arts administration, and to regional development. She was also recognised as Queensland's Community Philanthropist of the Year on 10 June 2022 and a life member of Philanthropy Australia in 2021.
