= Francis Hixson =

Royal Navy officer

Francis Hixson RN
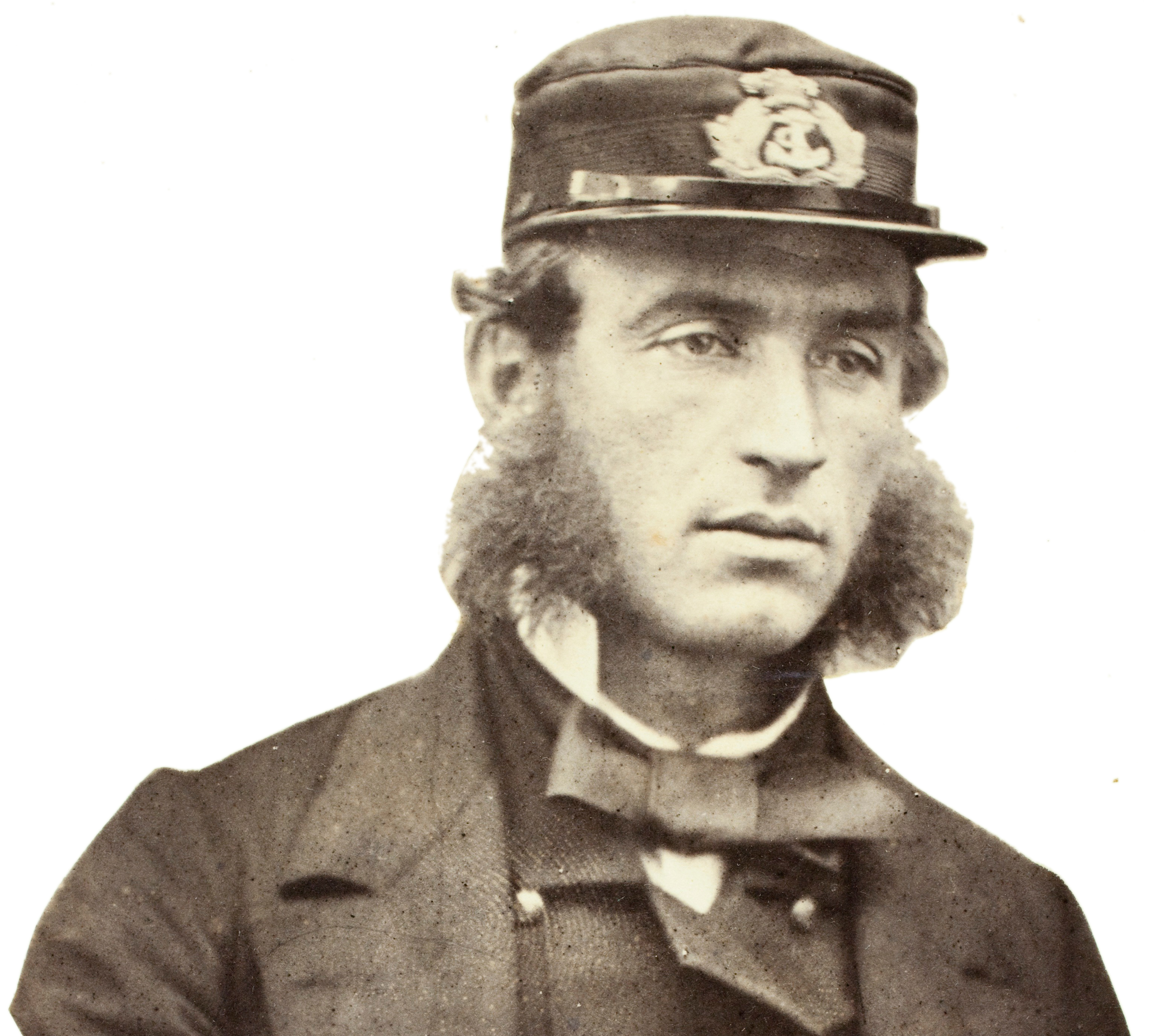
- Francis Hixson, Lieutenant HMS Herald, c. 1859
- Born: 8 January 1833; Dorsetshire, England
- Died: 2 March 1909 (aged 76); Double Bay, New South Wales, Australia
- Occupation: Naval commander
- Years active: 1852–1900

Francis Hixson (8 January 1833 – 2 March 1909) worked as a Royal Navy officer in colonial New South Wales and the Pacific. He was also superintendent of pilots, lighthouses, and harbours in New South Wales.

Hixson was a native of Dorsetshire, England, and, entering the Royal Navy, arrived at Sydney on HMS Havannah in 1848. When the Havannah was paid off, in 1852, he was appointed to the Herald, and when that vessel left Australian waters, in 1861, he was employed as chief assistant, to Commander Sidney in the survey of the coasts of New South Wales. In January 1863 he left the navy, having reached the rank of "master", and was appointed superintendent of pilots, lighthouses, and harbours in New South Wales. In the same year he organised the New South Wales Naval Brigade, which he commanded for many years. He was appointed President of the Marine Board of that colony in April 1872, and was Captain commanding the Naval Forces.

Captain Hixson married in 1861 Sarah, second daughter of the Hon. Francis Lord, of New South Wales. Two of their daughters married into the Fairfax family, publishers of the Sydney Morning Herald.

Hixson died at his residence in Double Bay, Sydney.
