= Warwick Oswald Fairfax =

Australian journalist and businessman

Sir Warwick Fairfax
- Born: Warwick Oswald Fairfax; 19 December 1901; Double Bay, New South Wales
- Died: 14 January 1987 (aged 85); Double Bay, New South Wales
- Burial place: South Head Cemetery
- Education: Warden House School, Kent, England; Geelong Grammar School, Victoria; University of Sydney; Balliol College, Oxford
- Occupations: Newspaper proprietor; cattle breeder; playwright
- Spouses: Betty Wilson (m. 1928; div. 1945); Hanne Anderson (m. 1948; div. 1959); Mary Wein (m. 1959)
- Children: 6, including James Fairfax, Warwick Fairfax
- Relatives: John Fairfax (great-grandfather)

Sir Warwick Oswald Fairfax (19 December 1901 – 14 January 1987) was an Australian businessman prominent in the arts as a philanthropist, journalist and playwright. He was a member of the wealthy Fairfax family of media proprietors.

== Biography ==
Fairfax was the son of Sir James Oswald Fairfax (1863–1928) and great-grandson of John Fairfax. He graduated with a Bachelor of Arts at Balliol College, Oxford after studying at Geelong Grammar and the University of Sydney (where he was resident at St Paul's College).

=== Marriages ===
In 1928, Fairfax married Marcie Elizabeth (Betty) Wilson, the daughter of David Wilson KC and the niece of William Hardy Wilson. They had two children, James Fairfax (junior) and Caroline, before their divorce in 1945. Fairfax married Hanne Anderson in 1948 and they had one daughter, Annalise, before divorcing in 1959. He married Mary Wein just after midnight on 4 July 1959. She had also been known as Marie Wein and Mary Symonds (from her earlier marriage to Cedric Symonds). Warwick Geoffrey Oswald Fairfax, Anna and Charles were his children with his third wife, Mary, Lady Fairfax. They grew up in Fairwater, the Fairfax family's harbourside home in Double Bay, where Lady Fairfax hosted some memorable parties, including a ball for 1000 people in 1973 to celebrate the opening of the Sydney Opera House, when guests included Rex Harrison, Rudolf Nureyev, Liberace and Imelda Marcos.

=== Business ===
Fairfax joined John Fairfax and Sons in 1925, became a director in 1927 and managing director in 1930. He was chairman of Associated Newspapers Ltd. between 1956 and 1977. During his time as managing director and subsequently chairman, Fairfax was instrumental in floating the then privately held John Fairfax & Sons Pty Ltd as John Fairfax Limited, later John Fairfax Holdings Limited and subsequently Fairfax Media.

"Sir Warwick's contribution to the Fairfax company, which expanded so markedly in his lifetime, was perhaps the greatest of any of the Fairfaxes since the company's founder..... Sir Warwick's guidance of the Herald coincided with the expansion of John Fairfax into one of the great public companies of Australia, with interests in television, radio and newsprint, as well as newspapers and magazines."

— James Fairfax, Chairman of John Fairfax Limited in 1987 and a son of Sir Warwick.

He owned extensive property holdings, south-west of Sydney where he bred cattle. This area was subsequently developed into outer residential developments in the suburb of Harrington Park.

=== Philanthropy and honours ===
In 1934 Fairfax acquired the Ure Smith publications Home and Art in Australia, and furthered their support of contemporary Australian artists. He defended the controversial awarding of the 1943 Archibald Prize to Dobell and purchased works by leading Australian painters. He financially backed the Kirsova Ballet company, and was a board member of the Australian Elizabethan Theatre Trust from 1954 and vice president from 1969. He served as governor from 1975 to 1985. He served on the governing council of the Australian National University from 1963 to 1974.

He was appointed a Knight Bachelor in 1967 in recognition of his service to the community.

== Publications ==
- A Century of Australian Journalism, The Sydney Morning Herald and its Record of Australian Life (ed.)(1931)
- Men, Parties and Politics (1943)
- A Victorian Marriage (1951 play, produced by John Alden)
- Vintage for Heroes (1952 play)
- The Bishop's Wife (1956 play)
- The Triple Abyss – Towards a Modern Synthesis (1965)
