= Ruth Fairfax =

Australian feminist (1878–1948)

Ruth Fairfax OBE
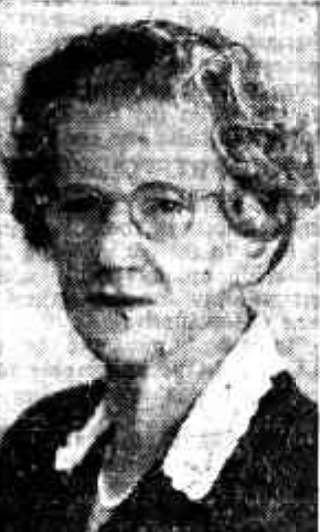
- Ruth Beatrice Fairfax, pictured in 1948
- Born: Ruth Beatrice Dowling; 8 October 1878; Lue, near Rylstone, New South Wales
- Died: 1 February 1948 (aged 69); St Luke's Hospital, Potts Point, New South Wales
- Burial place: Rookwood Cemetery
- Education: Sydney Church of England Girls' Grammar School; Women's Institutes
- Known for: Leadership of the Australian Country Women's Association in Queensland and New South Wales; Vice President of the Associated Country Women of the World
- Spouse: John Hubert Fraser Fairfax (m. 1899)
- Children: 1
- Parents: Vincent James Dowling (father); Frances Emily (née) Breillat (mother)

Ruth Beatrice Fairfax (8 October 1878 – 1 February 1948) was a founding member of the Australian Country Women's Association and the first President of the Queensland Country Women's Association. The federal electorate of Fairfax is named in her honour.

== Early life ==
Fairfax was born Ruth Beatrice Dowling to Frances Emily Dowling née Breillat and Vincent James Dowling on 8 October 1878, in the small town of Lue, near the larger town of Rylstone, New South Wales, Australia. She was educated at by home by governesses, and also attended Sydney Church of England Girls' Grammar School.

Ruth Dowling and John Hubert Fraser Fairfax were married on 2 February 1899, an occasion "for great rejoicing, because it was the wedding day of the popular and universally-beloved daughter of the Squire of Lue, Miss Dowling, whose hand was claimed by Mr. Hubert Fairfax, son of Sir James Fairfax, of The Sydney Morning Herald." The Mudgee Guardian and North-Western Representative reported that the bride was "beautiful in a dress of white duchesse satin, trimmed with cream lace and chiffon and flowers on bodice. She wore a wreath of orange blossoms and heather in her hair, with diamond crescent, the gift of her father and mother, and on the bodice a diamond brooch, the gift of Sir James and Lady Fairfax, whilst the floral bouquet, the gift of the bridegroom, completed a living picture that will long be remembered by all present."

The Fairfax family moved to Dalmore Station near Longreach, Queensland, then in 1908 to Marinya station near Cambooya, Queensland on the Darling Downs. In 1909 their only child, Vincent was born. They travelled to England in 1912, but returned to Australia at the outbreak of the First World War.

== Leadership of women's organisations ==
Ruth Fairfax became President of the Toowoomba branch of the Australian Comfort Fund, providing support for soldiers fighting in the war and she became recognised as a practical woman with organisational and leadership skills.

There were, in the early years of the 20th century, a number of women's groups established, including the National Council of Women, Brisbane Women's Club, and the Queensland Women's Electoral League. There was however, a need identified for an organisation dedicated to the needs of country women. On 10 August 1922, in a meeting at the Albert Hall, Brisbane, Fairfax was elected President of the newly established Queensland Country Women's Association. This meeting was timed to coincide with the Brisbane Exhibition, when there were likely to be large numbers of rural women in Brisbane. The first meeting of the newly formed Association was held in Toowoomba on 12 September 1922, chaired by Fairfax. Fairfax then went on a tour of six months around outback Queensland, establishing branches of the Country Women's Association and recruiting women to their local branches. In 1929, Fairfax travelled to the UK where she studied at Women's Institutes in England and Scotland. She also represented the Country Women's Association at the First International Conference of Rural Women's Organisations in London, and at the International Council of Women in Vienna.

Her passion for women in country areas was long-standing, and she thought of country women as a sisterhood, promoting the idea of mutual help and support. She and her family moved to New South Wales in 1931, as her son took up a post with The Sydney Morning Herald, a family business concern since 1841. Her home in Sydney was the 6,986-square-metre (75,200 sq ft), Elaine, on the waterfront at Seven Shillings Beach, Double Bay. This property was built by the Fairfax family in 1891 and, in 2019, was sold for in excess of A$70 million to Scott Farquhar.

After the move to New South Wales, Ruth Fairfax continued to be involved in the Country Women's Association. She was the president of the metropolitan group in Sydney and also honorary secretary of the New South Wales Country Women's Association. She was a vice president of the Associated Country Women of the World, and attended conferences in Washington and London in her role. She was also an editor of The Countrywoman in New South Wales : official journal of the Country Women's Association of New South Wales which was published from 1937 – 1957.

She was actively involved in a number of other organisations, including as the vice-president of the ladies' auxiliary of the Adult Deaf and Dumb Society of New South Wales, and as a member of the board of directors of St. Luke's Hospital, Darlinghurst. She was a member of the State executive and then the General Council of the Girl Guides' Association. She was appointed a trustee of the Public Library of New South Wales in 1937, and served in that role until her death. She was chairman of the Women's Council of the Australian Board of Missions, and a patroness of the Kooroora Club for business girls, which formed in 1929.

In 1935 she was appointed an Officer of the British Empire in recognition of her services.

In 1944, the Queensland Country Women's Association established the Ruth Fairfax Bursary.

== Later life ==
In her later years, she was afflicted with diabetes. Fairfax died on 1 February 1948 from chronic nephritis in St Luke's Hospital, Potts Point, Sydney. Ruth Fairfax House, the new state headquarters of the Queensland Country Women's Association, opened on 10 February after her death. It was a Japanese house imported from Japan in 1878 by Judge George William Paul.

Her husband, John Hubert Fairfax (1872–1950), was a pastoralist, businessman and philanthropist, and grandson of John Fairfax, an early owner of The Sydney Morning Herald. Her son, Sir Vincent Charles Fairfax, (1909–1993), was well known for his generous philanthropy and supported organisations such as the Boy Scouts and Outward Bound. In 1962, Ruth Fairfax House was saved from demolition by dismantling it and reconstructing it in Ingham; it was listed on the Queensland Heritage Register in 2003.

== Gallery ==
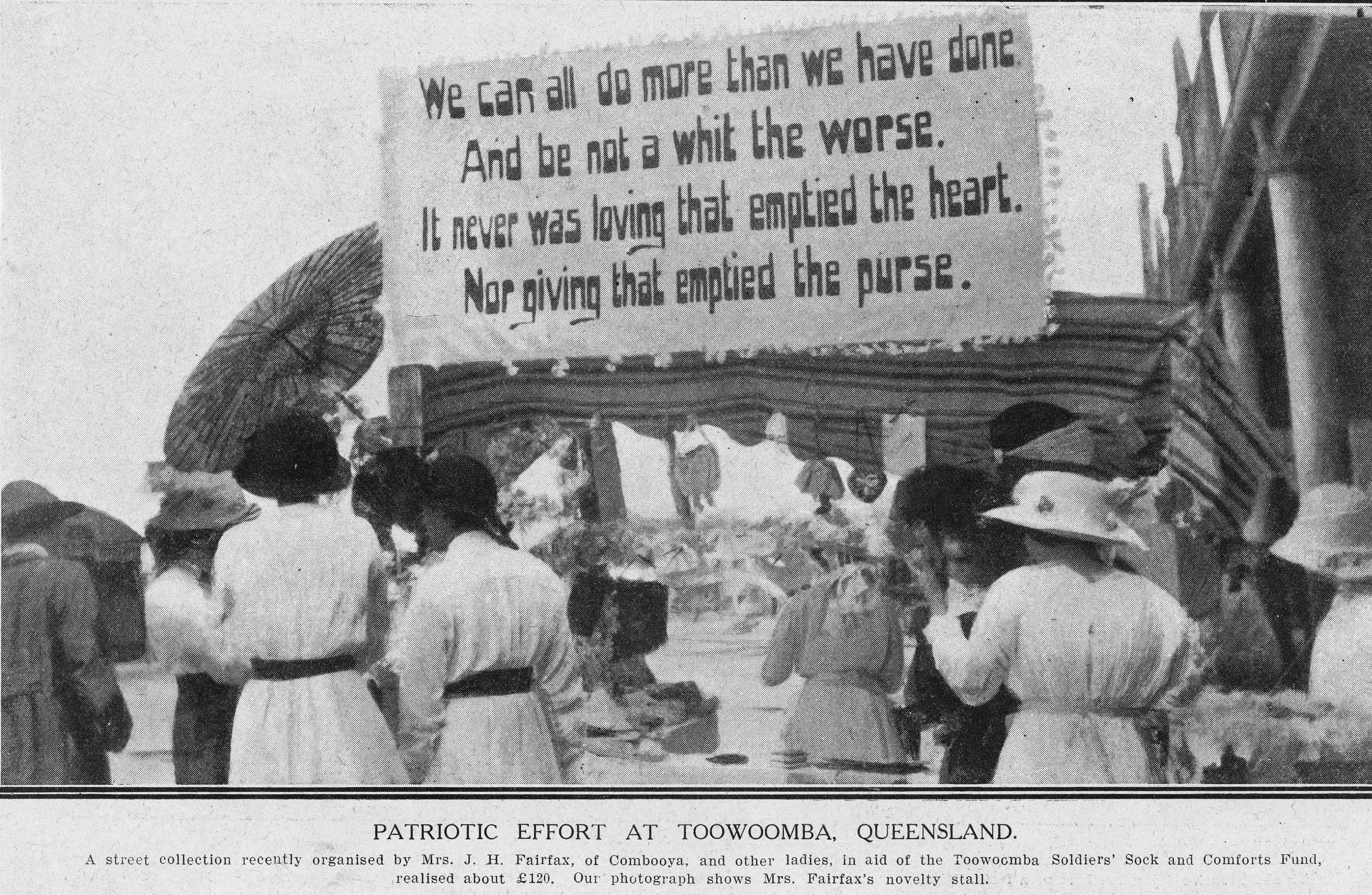
Fundraising in aid of the Toowoomba Soldiers' Sock and Comforts Fund, during World War I. The photograph shows Mrs Fairfax's novelty stall.

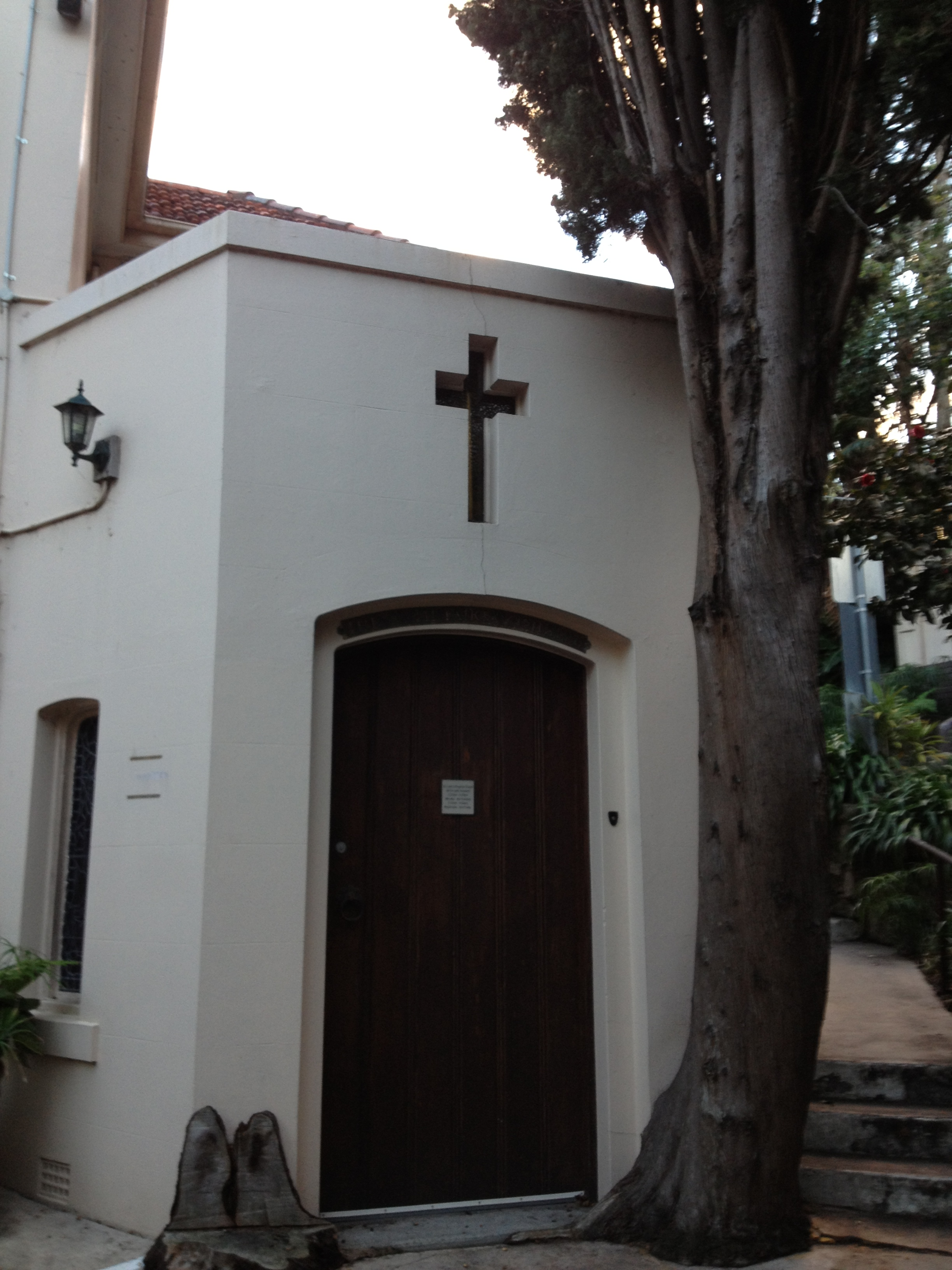
Ruth Fairfax Chapel, Potts Point, Sydney

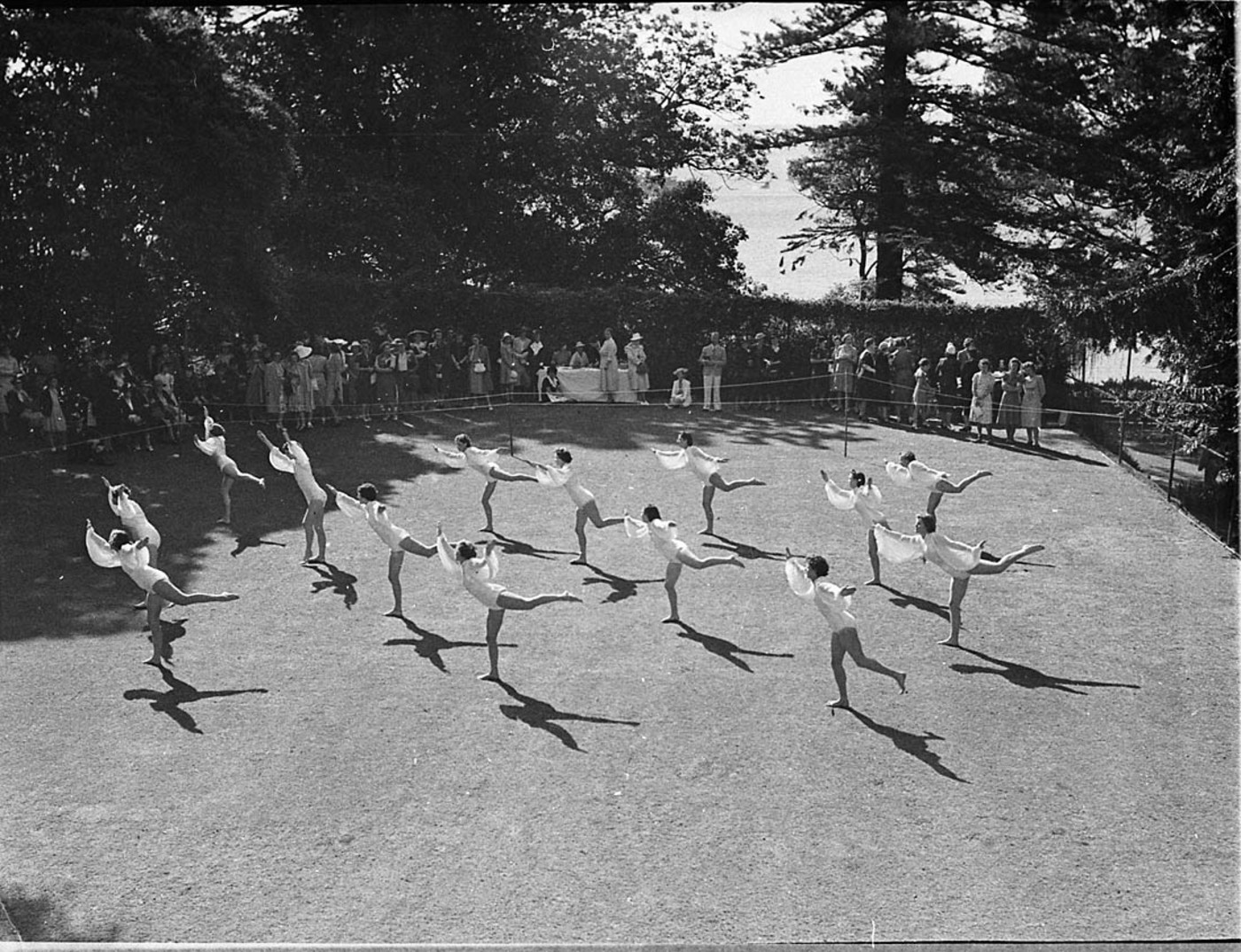
Ruth Fairfax's former house, Elaine, at Seven Shillings Beach, Double Bay
