= Warwick Fairfax =

Australian-American businessman

- Born: December 1960 (age 65)
- Citizenship: Australian
- Education: Oxford University; Harvard University
- Occupations: Business consultant Executive coach
- Known for: Privatisation of John Fairfax Holdings Limited
- Spouse: Gale
- Children: 3
- Parents: Sir Warwick Oswald Fairfax; Lady (Mary) Fairfax AC, OBE
- Relatives: James Fairfax AC (half-brother); James Oswald Fairfax (grandfather) James Reading Fairfax; great grandfather John Fairfax (great great grandfather)
- Website: fairfaxadvisers.com

Warwick Fairfax (born December 1960) is an Australian businessman and consultant based in the United States. He was well known in the 1990s as the media heir and business tycoon who privatised the publicly listed media company, John Fairfax Holdings Limited in 1987; only for the privatised company to fail three years later in spectacular fashion. He is the founder of Beyond the Crucible and host of the podcast of the same name.

== Biography ==
Fairfax is the son of Sir Warwick Oswald Fairfax and his third wife, Mary. Fairfax was educated at both Balliol College at Oxford and Harvard Business School, in the United States.

In 1987, following the death of his father, the 26-year-old "young Warwick" successfully took over the then publicly listed John Fairfax Holdings Limited but on 10 December 1990 the company collapsed and a receiver was appointed. The controversial method of financing and purchasing holdings of the established company from family members and the consequential problems arising in the media group in later years are still cited today in Australian media history.

In 1991, he migrated to the United States and settled in Annapolis, Maryland, where he founded a business consultancy and executive coach business. In 2016, he founded Crucible Leadership, citing the lessons he learned from the failed takeover of the family media dynasty to offer "compelling insights for anyone who would like to wake up feeling inspired about their work, but doesn't." Crucible Leadership, a book in part describing the failed takeover and in part offering advice to help readers overcome their own setbacks was published in 2021.

He is married with three children and serves as an Elder at Bay Area Community Church in Annapolis.
