= Mary Fairfax =

Australian philanthropist (1922–2017)

Mary Fairfax AC, OBE
- Born: Marie Wein; 15 August 1922; Warsaw, Poland
- Died: 17 September 2017 (aged 95); Double Bay, New South Wales, Australia
- Other name: Lady Fairfax
- Citizenship: Australian
- Education: Presbyterian Ladies' College, Sydney
- Occupations: Businesswoman, philanthropist
- Known for: Wife of Sir Warwick Fairfax; Australian philanthropy
- Spouses: Cedric Symonds (m. 1945–1958) Sir Warwick Fairfax (m. 1959–1987)
- Children: Garth Symonds; Warwick Fairfax; Anna Cleary (adopted); Charles Fairfax (adopted)
- Awards: Officer of the Order of the British Empire (OBE) in 1976; Member of the Order of Australia (AM) in 1988; Companion of the Order of Australia (AC) in 2005

Mary Elizabeth Fairfax (formerly Symonds, born Marie Wein; 15 August 1922 – 17 September 2017) was an Australian businesswoman and philanthropist. As the third wife of wealthy media proprietor Sir Warwick Fairfax, she became known as Lady Fairfax upon his knighthood in 1967. She inherited most of his vast fortune upon his death in January 1987, becoming one of Australia's richest women.

== Biography ==
Marie Wein was born into a Jewish family in Warsaw, the daughter of Anna (née Szpiegelglass) and Kevin Wein, the son of a miller. She came to Australia with her parents in the late 1920s to escape European anti-Semitism. She attended the Presbyterian Ladies' College in Sydney, where she won prizes for history and chemistry. She eventually came to own several Sydney dress shops.

In 1945, Wein married solicitor Cedric Symonds, with whom she had one son, Garth. She began having an affair with Warwick Oswald Fairfax, a scion of the Fairfax family, in the late 1950s. She divorced her husband in 1958 and married Fairfax on 4 July 1959, the day after he divorced his second wife. She converted from Judaism to Catholicism before the wedding. They had three children: Warwick Jr., Anna and Charles.

After the death of her husband Sir Warwick in 1987, Fairfax continued to live in the family home, Fairwater, which was owned by the Fairfax family since 1900. She moved to Manhattan, New York, in 1988, purchasing a penthouse apartment known as the "Chateau in the Sky", atop the Pierre Hotel for US$12 million. She sold the apartment in 1999 to financier Martin Zweig for $21.5 million and returned to Australia. At the time of Fairfax's purchase of the property, previous tenants had included John Paul Getty, Elizabeth Taylor, Yves Saint-Laurent and Mohamed al-Fayed.

Lady Fairfax died of natural causes at her family home on 17 September 2017.

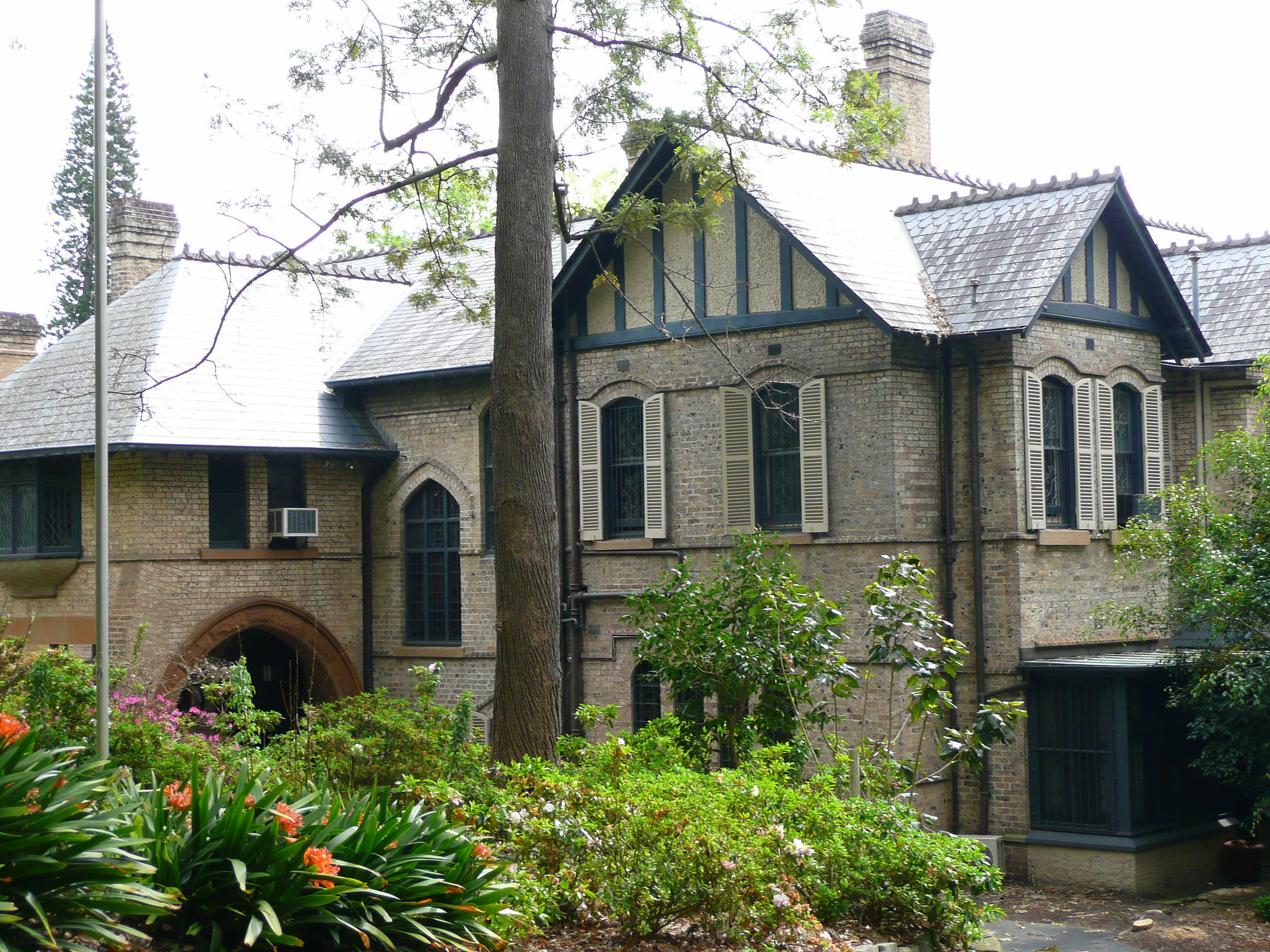
Fairwater, Double Bay home of Lady Mary Fairfax, until her 2017 death.

== Philanthropy, wealth and honours ==
Lady Fairfax was a chairman, founder and president of the Friends of The Australian Ballet and was the president of the Australian Opera Foundation during the 1970s. Her philanthropy included gifts of A$750,000 to St Vincent's Foundation and A$250,000 to the Garvan Foundation in 2002 on the occasion of her eightieth birthday.

Fairfax's personal wealth in 2012 was estimated by the BRW at A$418 million. Her assets included the residential land development, Harrington Park, near Camden, New South Wales. Harrington Park was the name of the cattle property once owned by Sir Warwick and Lady Fairfax.

In recognition of her service to the community, Fairfax was appointed an Officer of the Order of the British Empire (OBE) in 1976. She was made a Member of the Order of Australia (AM) in 1988, and upgraded to Companion of the Order of Australia (AC) in 2005, for "service to the community of wide ranging social and economic benefit through support and philanthropy for ongoing medical research initiatives, improved health care opportunities, nurturing artistic talent in young performers, and preservation of diverse cultural heritage".
