= John Fairfax =

Australian newspaper owner and politician

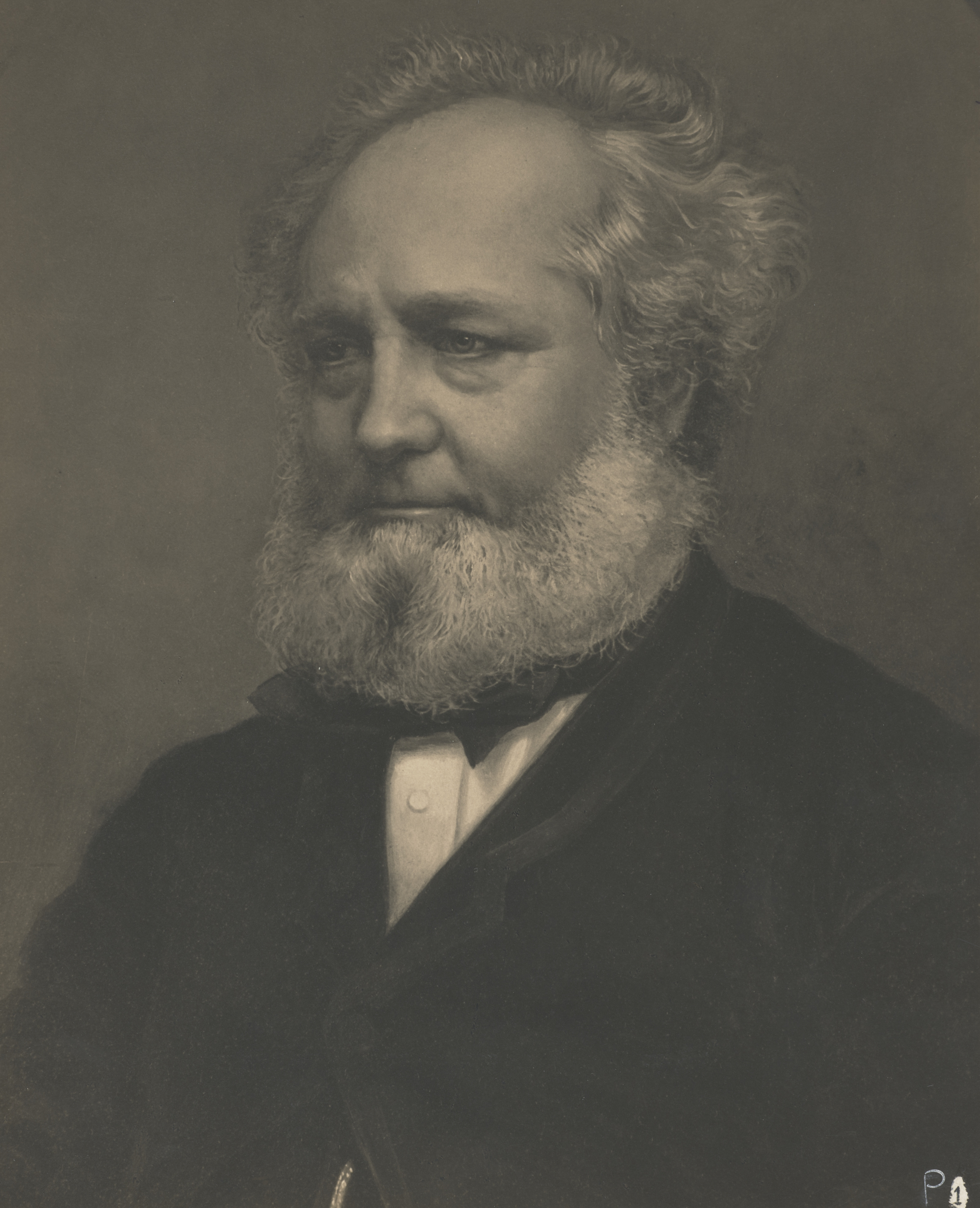
- John Fairfax c. 1861

Member of Legislative Council of New South Wales
- In office 3 November 1874 – 16 June 1877

Personal details
- Born: 24 October 1804 Barford, Warwickshire, England
- Died: 16 June 1877 (aged 72) Sydney, Australia
- Resting place: Rookwood Cemetery
- Spouse: Sarah Reading (m. 1827–1875)
- Children: Charles Fairfax; James Reading Fairfax; Edward Fairfax
- Occupation: Journalist; company director; politician; newspaper owner
- Known for: Development of John Fairfax & Sons media enterprise
- Board member of: Australian Mutual Provident Society; Australian Joint Stock Bank; The Australian Gaslight Co.

John Fairfax (24 October 1804 – 16 June 1877) was an English-born journalist, company director, politician, librarian and newspaper owner, known for the incorporation of the major newspapers of modern-day Australia.

== Early life ==
Fairfax was born in Barford, Warwickshire, the second son of William Fairfax and his wife, Elizabeth née Jesson. William Fairfax at the time of John's birth was in the building and furnishing trade. In 1817, John Fairfax was apprenticed to William Perry, a bookseller and printer in Warwick; he moved to London in 1825 and began working in a compositor in a printing office. Fairfax married Sarah Reading on 31 July 1827. He purchased an interest in The Leamington Chronicle and Warwickshire Reporter, was printer of the Leamington Spa Courier, and had a book binding business in Leamington. At this time Leamington was one of the leading spa towns in the UK.

Fairfax and his family reached Sydney on 26 September 1838; Fairfax had just £5 in his pocket.

== Business activities in Australia ==
In 1841, Fairfax purchased the daily newspaper The Sydney Herald and renamed it The Sydney Morning Herald the following year. Fairfax's family were to control the newspaper for almost 150 years.

In 1851, John Fairfax was a foundation director of the Australian Mutual Provident Society, and in the 1860s a director of the Sydney Insurance Co., the New South Wales Marine Insurance Co., the Australian Joint Stock Bank and The Australian Gaslight Co. and a trustee of the Savings Bank of New South Wales.

== Final years ==
Fairfax died at his home, Ginahgulla, Bellevue Hill, on 16 June 1877. He was buried at the Rookwood Cemetery, Independent Section, on 19 June 1877.

== Legacy ==
John Fairfax's name lives on in the form of Fairfax Media, formerly John Fairfax Holdings and before that, John Fairfax and Sons; although the Fairfax family no longer control the eponymous company.
