= 2022 Queen's Birthday Honours (Australia) =

Australian government recognitions

The 2022 Queen's Birthday Honours for Australia were announced on 13 June 2022 by the Governor-General, David Hurley. The Birthday Honours are appointments by some of the 15 Commonwealth realms of Queen Elizabeth II to various orders and honours to reward and highlight good works by citizens of those countries. The Birthday Honours are awarded as part of the Queen's Official Birthday celebrations during the month of June.

== Order of Australia ==
General division ribbon

Military division ribbon

=== Companion of the Order of Australia (AC) ===
==== General Division ====
- The Honourable John Duncan Anderson, AO – For eminent service to rural and regional development, to leadership in international agricultural research and food security, to social commentary, and through contributions to not-for-profit organisations.
- Richard Leigh Clifford, AO – For eminent service to business in the aviation, arts and education sectors, to the community through charitable support and scholarships, and for philanthropic contributions.
- Gina Madeline Fairfax – For eminent service to the community through leadership roles in charitable organisations, as an advocate for philanthropy, to arts administration, and to regional development.
- Emeritus Professor Anne Josephine Green – For eminent service to science, particularly physics and astrophysics, as an educator and researcher, as a mentor to colleagues and students, and a role model to women.
- Professor Tanya Mary Monro – For eminent service to scientific and technological development, to research and innovation, to tertiary education, particularly in the field of photonics, and to professional organisations.
- Dr Brendan Francis Murphy – For eminent service to medical administration and community health, particularly as Chief Medical Officer, and to nephrology, to research and innovation, and to professional organisations.
- Dr Patricia Margaret Selkirk, AAM – For eminent service to science and conservation, particularly through research of Antarctic and sub-Antarctic terrestrial ecosystems, to tertiary education, and as a mentor and champion for women.
- Her Excellency the Honourable Dr Jeannette Rosita Young – For eminent service to public health administration, to medicine and medical research, to the tertiary education sector, and as the 27th Governor appointed in Queensland.

==== Military Division ====
- Vice Admiral David Lance Johnston, AO, RAN – For eminent service to the Australian Defence Force through strategic stewardship and capability integration.

=== Officer of the Order of Australia (AO) ===
==== General Division ====
- The Honourable Edvard William Alstergren, QC – For distinguished service to the judiciary and to the law, and to sport as an administrator, coach and athlete.
- The Honourable Lawrence James Anthony – For distinguished service to the people and Parliament of Australia, to political institutions, to business, and youth leadership organisations.
- Sister Brigid Marie Arthur – For distinguished service to social welfare, particularly asylum seekers and refugees, and to Catholic education.
- Alan John Bansemer – For distinguished service to public administration, particularly health through leadership and policy development.
- Ashleigh Barty – For distinguished service to tennis at the elite level, and to youth development programs.
- Professor Janette Cecile Brand-Miller, AM – For distinguished service to science, notably in the field of human nutrition, and as an advocate for people with disability.
- Philip Brass – For distinguished service to business, to youth leadership and charitable organisations, and for philanthropic contributions.
- Andrew Cappie-Wood – For distinguished service to public administration in New South Wales and the Australian Capital Territory.
- Dr Kerry Gai Chant, PSM – For distinguished service to the people of New South Wales through public health administration and governance, and to medicine.
- Professor Peter Fook Meng Choong – For distinguished service to orthopaedic medicine, to research and tertiary medical education, and to professional associations.
- Distinguished Professor Michelle Genevieve Craske – For distinguished service to psychology, particularly the study of anxiety and depression, and to tertiary education.
- Joseph de Bruyn – For distinguished service to industrial relations, particularly the trade union sector, for superannuation reform, and to higher education.
- Professor Basil John Donovan – For distinguished service to medicine in the field of sexual health through tertiary education, research and advisory roles.
- Emeritus Professor Warren John Ewens – For distinguished service to biology and data science, to research, and to tertiary education.
- Antony Paul Hasham, AM – For distinguished service to children's charitable organisations, and to community health through drug prevention education programs.
- Professor Marnie Hughes-Warrington – For distinguished service to tertiary education and governance as an administrator, leader and mentor.
- Dr Marlene Kanga, AM – For distinguished service to engineering, particularly as a global leader and role model to women, to professional organisations, and to business.
- Dr Andrew Kuper – For distinguished service to the impact investing industry, to global business leadership, and to financial inclusion.
- Ray Lawler, OBE – For distinguished service to the performing arts as an actor, playwright and director.
- Dr Carmen Mary Lawrence – For distinguished service to the people and Parliaments of Australia and Western Australia, to conservation, and to arts administration.
- Christopher Byron Leptos, AM – For distinguished service to the not-for-profit sector through leadership and philanthropic support, to the public sector, and to education.
- The Honourable Robert Bruce McClelland – For distinguished service to the people and Parliament of Australia, to the law, social justice and law reform.
- Professor Mary-Louise McLaws – For distinguished service to medical research, particularly to epidemiology and infection prevention, to tertiary education, and to health administration.
- Professor Guy Barrington Marks – For distinguished service to respiratory medicine and research, and to tertiary education.
- The Honourable Stephen Paul Martin – For distinguished service to the people and Parliament of Australia, to charitable organisations, and to regional sport and education.
- Peter Gahan Matthews – For distinguished service to cave and karst surveying, documentation and publication, and to speleological organisations.
- Rear Admiral John Timothy Rush RFD, QC – For distinguished service to the law, notably as an Australian Defence Force senior legal officer, and to the community of Victoria.
- Robert Salteri – For distinguished service to the transport, shipping and Defence industries, and to the community through philanthropic contributions.
- Emeritus Professor Peter Gordon Saunders – For distinguished service to tertiary education, particularly through social policy research and development.
- Dr Ruth Elizabeth Shean – For distinguished service to public administration, and to not-for-profit and community health organisations.
- Clinical Associate Professor Catharyn Johanna Stern – For distinguished service to gynaecology, to reproductive medicine and fertility research, and to the community.
- John Owen Stone – For distinguished service to the people and Parliament of Australia, and to public administration.
- The late Shane Keith Warne – For distinguished service to cricket as a player, role model and commentator, to the community through charitable initiatives, and for philanthropic contributions.

==== Military Division ====
- Major General David Peter Coghlan, AM – For distinguished service in the field of Defence capability acquisition and sustainment as Head of Land Systems Division and Head Armoured Vehicle Division.
- Lieutenant General Gavan John Reynolds, AM – For distinguished service as the Military Representative to the North Atlantic Treaty Organisation and European Union, Head Military Strategic Planning and Chief of Defence Intelligence.

=== Member of the Order of Australia (AM) ===
==== General Division ====
- Laurence Cheong Ah Toy – For significant service to primary industry, to education, and to the community.
- Professor Shirley Anne Alexander – For significant service to tertiary education administration, and to learning technologies.
- Emeritus Professor Mary Elizabeth Hiscock (Allan) – For significant service to tertiary education, and to the law.
- Dr Deidre Karen Anderson – For significant service to tertiary education, and to sports administration.
- Alison Jean Andrews – For significant service to the print media, and to the community.
- Andreas George Andrianopoulos – For significant service to business, and to philanthropy.
- Dr Susan Mary Arbuckle – For significant service to perinatal medicine, and to professional associations.
- The Honourable Louise Marjorie Asher – For significant service to the people and Parliament of Victoria.
- Judith Mary Atkinson – For significant service to the early childhood care industry.
- Emeritus Professor Marcus David Atlas – For significant service to tertiary medical education, and to otolaryngology.
- The Honourable Robert Peter Austin – For significant service to the law and to the judiciary, and to education.
- Professor Graham David Barrett – For significant service to ophthalmology, and to professional organisations.
- Dr Keith Clifford Bell, RFD – For significant service to surveying, to geospatial information, and to humanitarian operations.
- Jason Belmonte – For significant service to tenpin bowling at the elite level.
- Professor Suresh Kumar Bhargava – For significant service to tertiary education, and to Australia-India relations.
- Clinical Professor Sameer Bhole – For significant service to dentistry, to education and research, and to professional associations.
- Stephen John Birney – For significant service to industrial relations, and to the community.
- Sophie Jocasta Blackall – For significant service to children's literature.
- Bethlyn Jan Blackwood – For significant service to secondary education, and to youth.
- Dr Meredith Louise Borland – For significant service to emergency medicine, particularly paediatrics, and to medical research.
- Leighton James Boyd – For significant service to people who are blind or have low vision.
- Franklyn Roger Brazil – For significant service to medical research, and to agriculture.
- Professor Emerita Deborah Jane Brennan – For significant service to social policy research, to gender equality, and to tertiary education.
- Warrick James Brewer – For significant service to neuropsychology, and to professional societies.
- Judith Lea Brinsmead – For significant service to charitable organisations, and to business.
- Ann Therese Byrne – For significant service to the superannuation sector, and to the community.
- The late Dr James Cameron – For significant service to cardiology, and to professional societies.
- The Honourable Timothy Francis Carmody – For significant service to the law, and to the judiciary.
- Craig Allan Carracher – For significant service to volleyball through administrative roles.
- Emeritus Professor Brenda Cherednichenko – For significant service to tertiary education, and to first nations peoples.
- Bradley Wayne Chilcott – For significant service to asylum seekers and refugees, and to the multicultural community.
- Cristina Pieta Cifuentes – For significant service to economic and energy sector regulation, and to consumer protection.
- Sonya Fay Clancy – For significant service to social enterprise, and to the financial sector.
- Ronald Conry – For significant service to the heating, ventilation, air conditioning and refrigeration industry.
- Alison Covington – For significant service to social welfare and sustainability programs.
- Commissioner Andrew Stuart Crisp, APM – For significant service to the emergency management sector in Victoria.
- Professor Kay Margaret Crossley – For significant service to physiotherapy, and to professional organisations.
- Professor Joy Damousi – For significant service to social sciences and the humanities, to history, and to tertiary education.
- Dr Patricia Margaret Davidson – For significant service to medical administration, and to professional associations.
- Peter James De Cure – For significant service to the community of South Australia through a range of roles.
- The Honourable Ivan Noel Dean, APM – For significant service to the people and Parliament of Tasmania, and to the community.
- Emeritus Professor Leigh Walter Delbridge – For significant service to endocrinology, and to medical education.
- Margaret Helen Dence – For significant service to the performing arts as an actor.
- The Honourable Justice Sarah Catherine Derrington – For significant service to the judiciary and to the law, and to legal education.
- Ian William Dickson – For significant service to the performing arts as a benefactor.
- Professor Anne Cheryl Dissanayake – For significant service to medical research, to tertiary education, and to professional societies.
- Paul Donovan – For significant service to the tourism sector in Queensland.
- Professor Angela Fay Dulhunty – For significant service to medical research, and to professional organisations.
- Christina Efthymiades – For significant service to charitable organisations, and to the public relations industry.
- Professor Dennis Gordon Eggington – For significant service to the Indigenous community of Western Australia.
- Jeffrey Roy Ellison – For significant service to the tourism industry, and to the community.
- Jason Peter Ellsmore – For significant service to education, and to youth sports.
- Robyn-Lee Erskine – For significant service to accountancy, and to professional associations.
- Dr Harold Fabrikant – For significant service to the performing arts, and to medicine.
- Jean-Pierre Famechon – For significant service to boxing at the elite level.
- Geoffrey Noel Fitzpatrick – For significant service to optometry, and to the community.
- Colonel Peter Ronald Florance – For significant service to veterans and their families, and to the community.
- Dr Michael Anthony Foley – For significant service to community health, and to dental education.
- Dr Geoffrey Michael Folie – For significant service to the mining and resources sector, and to business.
- Robert James Fordham – For significant service to rugby union through a range of roles.
- Philip William Forrest – For significant service to Australia-Singapore business relations.
- Catherine Fox – For significant service to journalism, and to gender equality and diversity.
- Babette Avita Francis – For significant service to the community through a range of roles.
- Emeritus Professor Shu Fukai – For significant service to agriculture and food science research, and to education.
- Professor David Kenneth Gardner – For significant service to reproductive medicine, and to education.
- Philip Stuart Garling – For significant service to the energy, construction and infrastructure sectors.
- Professor Peter Anastasius Gerangelos – For significant service to tertiary legal education, particularly to constitutional law, and to professional organisations.
- Her Honour Magistrate Jennifer Anne Goldsbrough – For significant service to the judiciary and to the law, and to legal education.
- George Robert Greenberg – For significant service to aged care, and to medical advisory roles.
- Dr Steven Jon Hambleton – For significant service to medical governance, to professional associations, and to the community.
- Steven John Harker – For significant service to the banking sector, and to the community.
- Todd Harper – For significant service to cancer support programs, and to medical governance.
- Richard John Hearn – For significant service to aged care, and to the community.
- Dr Anita Marianne Heiss – For significant service to tertiary Indigenous studies, and to the arts.
- Dr Peter David Heysen – For significant service to general medicine, and to the community.
- Nicholas Richard Heyward – For significant service to the arts, and to orchestra leadership.
- Professor Louise Mary Hickson – For significant service to tertiary education, and audiology associations.
- Dr Sarah Nicole Hilmer – For significant service to clinical and geriatric pharmacology.
- The late Raymond Stenton Hind – For significant service to intellectual property law.
- John Hamilton Hood – For significant service to social welfare organisations, and to the community.
- Catherine Hughes – For significant service to immunisation.
- Emeritus Bishop Peter William Ingham – For significant service to the Catholic Church in Australia.
- Louis Albert Johnson – For significant service to the community through a range of organisations.
- Brian Jones – For significant service to chess at the elite level.
- Diana Susanne Jones – For significant service to conservation and the environment.
- Robert Bernard Kelly – For significant service to the insurance sector, and to the community.
- Anne Vanessa Kennedy – For significant service to water conservation, and to the community.
- David Arthur Kenyon – For significant service to the community of the Australian Capital Territory region.
- Dr Michelle Kiley – For significant service to neurology, and to professional associations.
- Kathleen Mary Kirby – For significant service to public administration, and to tertiary education.
- Emeritus Professor Valerie Anne Kirk – For significant service to tertiary arts education, and as an artist and curator.
- Betty Klimenko – For significant service to motorsport, and to charitable organisations.
- Elizabeth Ann Koff – For significant service to public health administration and governance, and to professional organisations.
- Barry Martin Lambert – For significant service to cannabinoid medical research, to business, and to charitable organisations.
- Graham Lancaster – For significant service to the law, and to the Illawarra region.
- Dr Robyn Gaye Langham – For significant service to renal health research, and to tertiary medical education.
- Meghann Moira Lanning – For significant service to women's cricket at the elite level.
- Professor Kathy Laster – For significant service to the law, and to legal advisory roles.
- The late Mr David John Leckie – For significant service to the broadcast media through executive roles.
- Dr Jeremy Wilfrid Leech – For significant service to the forestry industry, to tertiary education, and to the community.
- Graeme Colvin Legge, OAM – For significant service to emergency response organisations, and to the community.
- Ian Grant Levi – For significant service to the community through a range of organisations.
- Joseph George Lewitt – For significant service to architecture, and to public administration.
- Gilla Liberman – For significant service to the Jewish community, and to women.
- Dr Rosemary Anne Lierse – For significant service to music education.
- Serena Lillywhite – For significant service to business, and to tertiary education.
- Stephen Kin Ming Liu – For significant service to cancer support services, and to the community.
- Leslie Loble – For significant service to public administration, and to education.
- Gwenda Muriel Lucas – For significant service to calisthenics, and to the community.
- Joanne Maree McCarthy – For significant service to the print media as a journalist.
- John McConaghy – For significant service to the yacht manufacturing sector.
- David Alexander McCredie, OBE – For significant service to Australia-United Kingdom business and trade relations.
- Ross Stewart MacDiarmid – For significant service to public administration, and to the community through a range of roles.
- Dr Rachel Elizabeth McFadyen – For significant service to biosecurity, and to entomology.
- Dr Louis Eugene McGuigan – For significant service to rheumatology, and to community health.
- Fiona McKenzie – For significant service to people with intellectual disability.
- Dr Ewen McPhee – For significant service to general medicine, to health administration, and to tertiary education.
- Professor Michael Mahony – For significant service to the life sciences, and to tertiary education.
- Wesley Marne – For significant service to the Indigenous community of Western Sydney.
- Dr Susan Marsden – For significant service to history and heritage as an author, academic and speaker.
- Professor Rebecca Sara Mason – For significant service to tertiary education, and to professional associations.
- Brenton Justin Mauriello – For significant service to Australia-ASEAN and Australia-Thailand business relations.
- Professor Rory Medcalf – For significant service to international relations, and to tertiary education.
- The Honourable Justice John Eric Middleton, QC – For significant service to the judiciary and to the law, and to professional associations.
- Professor Imogen Ann Mitchell – For significant service to intensive care medicine, and to tertiary education.
- Robyn Monro Miller – For significant service to the community through children's organisations.
- Brendan Joseph Moon – For significant service to public administration, and to rugby union.
- Matthew Moran – For significant service to the tourism and hospitality industries, and to charitable organisations.
- Emeritus Professor Neil Morgan – For significant service to public administration in Western Australia.
- The late The Honourable Timothy Sean Mulherin – For significant service to the people and Parliament of Queensland.
- Phyllis Constance Murphy – For significant service to architecture, and to build heritage conservation.
- Patrick Stuart Murray – For significant service to aviation safety, and to the air transport industry.
- Emeritus Professor Frank William Nicholas – For significant service to animal genetics, and to tertiary education.
- Ravi Inder Singh Nijjer – For significant service to maritime transport safety.
- Professor Jeremy J. Nicolle Oats – For significant service to women's health as a clinician and academic.
- David Keith Payes – For significant service to business, and to the community.
- Mark Damian Perica – For significant service to industrial relations, and to the law.
- Professor Phoebe Anne Phillips – For significant service to pancreatic cancer research.
- Muriel Kathleen Picton – For significant service to cricket as a player, administrator and coach.
- Dr Meron Edith Pitcher – For significant service to medicine, and to women's health.
- Jelena Popovic – For significant service to the judiciary, and to the law.
- The Honourable Elizabeth Jeanette Powell – For significant service to the people and Parliament of Victoria, and to the community.
- Gregory John Preston – For significant service to the property valuation industry.
- Philip Quast – For significant service to the arts as a performer, mentor and educator.
- Michael Quigley – For significant service to the telecommunications sector, and to education.
- Carol Raye – For significant service to the performing arts as an actor and producer.
- Professor Timothy Gerald Reeves – For significant service to sustainable agriculture research and production.
- The late Mr Ian Douglas Reid – For significant service to the community through not-for-profit and social welfare organisations.
- Professor Peter Revill – For significant service to microbiology and immunology research.
- Margaret Rosalind Richardson – For significant service to the Anglican Church of Australia.
- Anne Lindsey Riches – For significant service to community mental health programs and initiatives.
- Dr Shirleene Rose Robinson – For significant service to the LGBTIQ community, to marriage equality, and to history.
- Richard Neville Rogers – For significant service to the community through the not-for-profit sector.
- Anthony Vincent Roney – For significant service to the community through Lions International.
- Garry Winten Rothwell – For significant service to the not-for-profit sector, and to architecture.
- Susan Elizabeth Rothwell – For significant service to the not-for-profit sector, and to architecture.
- Michele Rumsey – For significant service to nursing, and to health care policy.
- Alan Graham Rydge – For significant service to event hospitality, and to the entertainment industry.
- Ms Mary (Maria) Said – For significant service to anaphylaxis treatment, education and prevention.
- Lesley Salem – For significant service to nursing, and to Indigenous health.
- Jillian Anne Saunders – For significant service to public administration.
- Anna Marjorie Schwartz – For significant service to the museums and galleries sector.
- Michelle Scollo – For significant service to community health through smoking prevention initiatives.
- Adam Scott – For significant service to golf at the elite level.
- Professor Clare Scott – For significant service to gynaecological oncology.
- The late Christine Josephine Sharp – For significant service to arts administration in a range of roles.
- Miriam Silva – For significant service to the multicultural community of South Australia, and to women.
- Helen Elizabeth Sjoquist – For significant service to the performing arts, and to youth.
- Kathleen Mary Sloane – For significant service to nursing, and to global women's health.
- Barbara Anne Slotemaker de Bruine – For significant service to squash as a player, administrator and coach.
- Alan Lindsay Southcott – For significant service to rowing as a competitor, administrator and coach.
- Anthony Kenrick Staveley – For significant service to community health, and to people with disability.
- Carmel Margaret Stefanoff – For significant service to youth through Girl Guides.
- Dr John Huston Stewart – For significant service to medicine as a nephrologist.
- Geoffrey Macquarie Stooke, OAM – For significant service to rugby union, to sports administration, to business, and to the community.
- Dr Ryan Anthony Story – For significant service to motorsport, and to the community.
- Michael John Sullivan – For significant service to people with disability in a range of roles.
- David Gordon Swift – For significant service to the energy sector of South Australia.
- Lloyd William Taylor – For significant service to policing organisations, and as an officer.
- Kerstin Thompson – For significant service to architecture, and to tertiary education.
- Rory Hamline Treweeke – For significant service to the rural community of New South Wales.
- Richard Thomas Underwood – For significant service to the community of Geelong.
- Kevin Douglas Walters, MBE – For significant service to cricket at the elite level.
- Michael John Ward, CSC – For significant service to the defence industry.
- Kerry Dhonal Watson – For significant service to the tourism industry, and to the major events sector.
- Dr Tarun Stephen Weeramanthri – For significant service to public health administration.
- Yvonne Weldon – For significant service to the Indigenous community of New South Wales.
- Ralph Wigg – For significant service to compliance standards in engineering.
- Emeritus Professor Hilary Patience Winchester – For significant service to tertiary education, and to governance, committee and advisory roles.
- Terence Ronald Winters – For significant service to the community through charitable organisations.
- Kevin John Wood – For significant service to recreational sailing.
- Dr Margaret Beverley Wood – For significant service to community nutritional health, and to tertiary education.
- Emeritus Professor Linda Worrall – For significant service to speech pathology through aphasia research and advocacy.
- Dr Timothy Andrew Wright – For significant service to primary and secondary education, and to professional associations.

==== Military Division ====
Navy

- Rear Admiral Wendy Anne Malcolm, CSM, RAN – For exceptional service in surface ship sustainment for the Australian Defence Force.
- Rear Admiral Ian Gordon Murray, RAN – For exceptional service to the Australian Defence Force in strategic logistics and operations support.
- Commodore Steven John Tiffen, RAN – For exceptional service in surface ship acquisition and sustainment for the Australian Defence Force.
- Captain Letitia Deborah Van Stralen, CSC, RAN – For exceptional service in senior leadership positions by enhancing culture and people systems, and building a framework for positive engagement with all people in the Royal Australian Navy.
- Commodore Gregory John Yorke, CSC, RAN – For exceptional service to the Royal Australian Navy in senior command positions.

Army

- Major General Jason Peter Blain, DSC, CSC – For exceptional performance of duty as Director General Force Options and Plans, Branch Head National Security Division in the Department of the Prime Minister and Cabinet and Commander 7th Brigade.
- Brigadier Matthew Ivan Burr – For exceptional service as Commander of the 4th Brigade force assigned as Commander Joint Task Force 646 and Commander Joint Task Group 629.2.
- Principal Chaplain Darren Peter Jaensch – For exceptional performance of duty in Chaplaincy leadership and development particularly as the Director General Chaplaincy - Army.
- Major General Paul Andrew Kenny, DSC, DSM – For exceptional service to the Australian Defence Force in the field of Special Operations command and senior staff appointments.
- Colonel Andrew Paul Moss, CSM – For exceptional service and significantly enhancing the operational effects and capabilities of the Australian Defence Force.
- Major General Christopher Robert Smith, DSC, CSC – For exceptional service as Chief of the Defence Force Liaison Officer to the Chairman of the Joint Chiefs of Staff United States and as Director General Land Operations, Army Headquarters.
- Brigadier Malcolm Dalziel Wells, DSC – For exceptional service as the Deputy Commander 2nd Division and Joint Task Force 629 and Commander of Joint Task Force 629 during OPERATION COVID-19 ASSIST.

Air Force

- Air Commodore Angela Maria Castner – For exceptional service to the Australian Defence Force in Logistics workforce development, fighter aircraft sustainment, and enterprise supply management.
- Air Commodore Kirrily Ann Dearing – For exceptional service to the Australian Defence Force in strategic engagement, integration of women in Afghan society, and military responses to international and domestic operations.
- Air Commodore Andrew Ronald Elfverson – For exceptional service to the Australian Defence Force in organisational development, and in delivery of the national program for the 2021 Royal Australian Air Force Centenary.
- Group Captain Lindley James Ghee, OAM – For exceptional service implementing change management in successive postings across the Royal Australian Air Force and Joint education and training communities.

==== Honorary Division ====
- Richard Jules Cohn – For significant service to paediatric cancer medicine, and to professional organisations.
- Maria Antoinette Fiatarone Singh – For significant service to geriatric medicine, to research, and to education.
- Jennifer Ann Moles – For significant service to historical conservation and town planning organisations.
- William Shannon – For significant service to the marketing and communications industry, particularly behavioural change initiatives.

=== Medal of the Order of Australia (OAM) ===
==== General Division ====
- Margaret Addicoat – For service to the community through volunteer roles.
- Sunday Adebiyi – For service to general practice medicine.
- Hasna Ahmad – For service to the community of Lakemba.
- Christopher Carl Aiken – For service to the community through chaplaincy roles.
- David John Allan – For service to the international community of Myanmar.
- David Anthony Allen – For service to the visual arts.
- Terri Gitsham Allen – For service to conservation and the environment.
- Joanne Andrews – For service to community of Sarsfield.
- Jakara Anthony – For service to sport as a gold medallist at the Beijing Winter Olympic Games 2022.
- Josie Jacqueline Arnold – For service to tertiary education.
- Michael Asher – For service to the Indigenous community, and to medicine.
- Frank Hedley Atkins – For service to the community of Tasmania.
- Jeanette Ayre – For service to the community through volunteer roles.
- Susan Elizabeth Baker – For service to conservation and the environment.
- Trevor Henry Bange – For service to recreational flying and gliding.
- George William Barber – For service to the community of the Mornington Peninsula.
- Racheline Marlene Barda – For service to the Jewish community of Sydney.
- Laurie Barnes – For service to baseball.
- Annette Dawn Barton – For service to occupational therapy.
- Cheryl Anne Bates – For service to community history preservation.
- John William Batley – For service to youth, and to the community of Adelaide.
- Stanley Lennard Basil Batten – For service to the community through a range of roles.
- Billy Baxter – For service to the performing arts, and to radio.
- Gregory Norman Beale – For service to community safety.
- Alexander Graham Bell – For service to community radio, and to country music.
- Mary Isabella Bell – For service to naval associations, and to pipe bands.
- Susan Bell – For service to the community through a range of roles.
- William Wallace (Wally) Bell – For service to rugby union.
- Andrew David Bellairs – For service to the performing arts, and to radio.
- Michael Benjamin – For service to the community of Dingley Village.
- Marilyn Bennet – For service to radio, and to the community.
- Peter Bevan – For service to general practice medicine.
- Asha Bhat – For service to the Indigenous community of Western Australia.
- Judith Helen Blacker – For service to social welfare organisations.
- William Douglas Blaikie – For service to the performing arts.
- Mark Blankfield – For service to the Jewish community of Victoria.
- Boguslawa Aleksandra Bliszczyk – For service to the Polish community of Victoria.
- Geoffrey Walter Boehm – For service to the community through a range of roles.
- Joseph Anthony Botta – For service to the community through a range of organisations.
- Graeme Botting – For service to the community of Hallett Cove.
- Kenneth Wilfred Bowen – For service to the community through a range of organisations.
- Stephen Craig Bowen – For service to the community of Albury-Wodonga.
- Rosemary Faye Boyd – For service to people who are blind or have low vision.
- Joan Bratel – For service to people with cerebral palsy.
- Graeme Victor Brauman – For service to the community through a range of roles.
- Diane Kathleen Brennan – For service to performing arts education.
- Anthony Hugh Briggs – For service to the cruising tourism industry.
- Alan David Brinkworth – For service to emergency response organisations.
- Desmond Brown – For service to tourism, and to the community.
- Jean Mary Bruce – For service to the community through charitable organisations.
- Helen Olga Bryant – For service to the Jewish community of Western Australia.
- Linda Rose Bull – For service to the performing arts.
- Vika Veiongo Bull – For service to the performing arts.
- Robert Sugden Burnett – For service to the community through a range of organisations.
- Donna Marie Buss – For service to mental health through therapy.
- James Butler – For service to people with cancer.
- Robert Calaby – For service to aviation in the Northern Territory.
- Helen Claire Campbell – For service to music through education and performance.
- Mans Carlsson – For service to the sustainable investment sector.
- Richard John Carney – For service to the community of Broken Hill.
- Stephen James Carre – For service to the community through a range of roles.
- Trevor Alan Carroll – For service to people with disability.
- Barbara Jocelyn Carter – For service to the community through a range of roles.
- Graham Dean Carter – For service to the community of Mount Gambier.
- Giuseppe Cavuoto – For service to the Italian community of South Australia.
- Greg Champion – For service to the performing arts, and to radio.
- Suzanne (Anne) Chapple – For service to community history.
- Terry Vincent Charlton – For service to the natural resource sector, to manufacturing, and to education.
- Soo-Tee Cheong – For service to architecture, to urban planning, and to the community.
- Joe Chindamo – For service to music, and to the performing arts.
- Jong-Gon Choi – For service to the Korean community of Victoria.
- Monica Chu – For service to the community through a range of roles.
- Jamie John Clark – For service to youth, and to the community.
- Alison Clarke – For service to people with learning difficulties, and to the community.
- Marjorie Clarke – For service to community history.
- Rosemary Elizabeth Clarke – For service to the community of the Mornington Peninsula.
- Colin Victor Coates – For service to speed skating.
- Michelle Louise Coffill – For service to public administration, and to animal welfare.
- Beccy Cole – For service to country music.
- Colleen Mary Condliffe – For service to the community of the Loddon Mallee, and to women.
- Hazel Mae Cook – For service to swimming.
- Bernard Corser – For service to the community through a range of roles.
- Ian James Cover – For service to the community through a range of roles.
- Harry David Cramer – For service to emergency response organisations.
- Marian Effie Crawley – For service to the community of Gloucester.
- Ron Edward Cregan – For service to the caravan and camping industry.
- Alan Charles Crosbie – For service to the community of Geelong.
- Donna Sharon Cross – For service to youth mental health and wellbeing.
- Thomas Anzac Cummings – For service to the community of Ballina.
- Ian Robert Cummins – For service to people with disability.
- Valda Mae D'Angri – For service to community history preservation.
- Dorothy Ann Danta – For service to the arts, particularly to music festivals.
- William Robert Darby – For service to the community of the Sunshine Coast.
- Frances Louise Dark – For service to psychiatry.
- John Michael Dasey – For service to the community through a range of roles.
- Janice Valma Davey – For service to marching and music through brass bands.
- Judith Louise Davey – For service to the museums and galleries sector.
- Sandra Davies – For service to the performing arts, and to music education.
- Michelle Paula Davis – For service to road safety, and to the community.
- Suzanne Hazel Dean – For service to clinical psychology, and to community mental health.
- Margaret Louise Dearricott – For service to the community of Kyneton.
- Bernadette Anne Dennis – For service to the community through a range of roles.
- Ian Denton – For service to secondary education.
- Christina Despoteris – For service to the Greek community of Melbourne.
- Dawn Dickson – For service to the community through a range of roles.
- Suzanne Mary Dominguez – For service to the museums and galleries sector.
- Mary Theresa Donnelly – For service to the community through a range of roles.
- Maria Krystyna Doogan – For service to the law, and to the judiciary.
- Christine Maria Douglas – For service to opera.
- Kathleen Mary Doyle – For service to the community through support for charitable organisations.
- Kerry Cecilia Doyle – For service to community health.
- Noel Stuart Doyle – For service to the community through support for charitable organisations.
- Paul Dravet – For service to movie theatre administration.
- Doris Dumbrill – For service to the community through a range of roles.
- Learne Dunne – For service to education in the Northern Territory.
- Richard John Dunstan – For service to medicine as a paediatrician.
- Elaine Joy Duyvestyn – For service to softball, and to early childhood education.
- Iryna Dvoskina – For service to paralympic athletics.
- John Patrick Dwyer – For service to military history organisations.
- Stuart Cameron Dye – For service to emergency response organisations.
- Patrick John Eadington – For service to people with disability.
- Quentin (Kent) Egerton-Warburton – For service to the agricultural technology industry.
- Richard Lewis Elkington – For service to the community through a range of roles.
- Robyn Vera Emery – For service to the community of the Blue Mountains.
- Hugh Fairfull-Smith – For service to geriatric medicine.
- Raymond Lance Fairweather – For service to the community of Maitland.
- Sharon Paula Fekete – For service to dirt track karting.
- Val Fell – For service to people with dementia.
- Cecile Roslyn Ferguson – For service to people with disability, and to the community.
- Pauline Dawn Fielden – For service to netball and tennis.
- Barry Finch – For service to at-risk youth, and to education.
- Jill Heather Finch – For service to community history.
- Peter John Fleming – For service to the community of Mildura.
- Michael James Foley – For service to local government.
- Florence Forbes – For service to country music, and to radio presentation.
- Daniel James Ford – For service to the Indigenous community of Western Australia.
- Moira Franklin – For service to the community of Gleniffer.
- Valerie Jean French – For service to the judiciary, and to the law.
- Anne Elizabeth Frost – For service to the performing arts.
- Lucie Anne Gabb – For service to the communities of Pennant Hills and Beecroft.
- Gregory James Gallagher – For service to the winemaking industry.
- Terence Roland Gallaway – For service to the broadcast news media.
- Robert Henry Gardiner – For service to the community through a range of roles.
- Lorraine Margaret Gardner – For service to children's health medical research.
- John Christopher Gatfield – For service to veterans, and to broadcast media.
- Eric Douglas Geldard – For service to the community of the Murilla Shire.
- Jacob George – For service to the community of Tasmania.
- Sandra George – For service to manufacturing, and to the community.
- Brian Francis Girling – For service to people with a disability, and to sailing.
- Fay Ellen Gleave – For service to emergency response organisations.
- Eric Ayre Gordon – For service to the Jewish community of Melbourne.
- Elena Gosse – For service to manufacturing, and to the community.
- Helen Granek – For service to the Jewish community, and to women.
- Malcolm Clive Grant – For service to the community of the Gisborne region.
- Celia Mary Gray – For service to conservation and the environment.
- Lynleigh Dawn Greig – For service to wildlife conservation.
- Lenore Grice – For service to surf lifesaving.
- Pamela Ann Griffith – For service to the visual arts.
- John Darrien Griffiths – For service to orthopaedic medicine.
- Bruce Noel Grimley – For service to veterans, and to the community.
- Maria Grosman – For service to the Slovenian community of New South Wales.
- Stanley Arthur Gyles – For service to rugby union.
- Mohamed Hage – For service to Australia-Arab business, trade and investment relations.
- David James Hammill – For service to medicine, and to the community.
- Jon Robin Harmer – For service to water polo.
- Janet Robin Harrison – For service to the Anglican Church of Australia, and to women.
- Lyndon Charles Hart – For service to the community through a range of roles.
- Amber Hasler – For service to performing arts administration.
- Charles Haswell – For service to social welfare organisations.
- Jack Hawkins – For service to the community through a range of roles.
- Donna Hay – For service to the food and hospitality sector as a cook and author.
- Philip David Hay – For service to veterans and their families.
- Douglas James Heazlewood – For service to veterans and their families.
- Wendy Leeanne Hellebrand – For service to the community through a range of roles.
- Brian Robert Henry – For service to the community through a range of roles.
- Judith Robyn Henschke – For service to people with disability.
- Stephanos Herodotou – For service to medicine, and to the Cypriot community of Victoria.
- Mabel Hibbert – For service to the Anglican Church of Australia.
- Maureen Louise Hickman – For service to the community of the Australian Capital Territory.
- Betty Hobbs – For service to the community of Sawtell.
- Christopher David Hogan – For service to medicine.
- Michael Ernest Hornby – For service to the community through a range of roles.
- Gary Michael Howard – For service to conservation and the environment.
- Rosemary Margaret Hyde – For service to the performing arts.
- William Ivory – For service to boxing, and to youth.
- Judith Mary Jacka – For service to community health through natural therapy.
- Penelope Jane Jakobovits – For service to the Jewish community.
- Ann Jardine – For service to tertiary education.
- Robert Martin Jay – For service to aged persons, and to education.
- Wendy Jane Jenkins – For service to community health, particularly lung transplant research.
- Neil McArthur (Mac) Jensen – For service to the Indigenous community of Western Australia.
- Lester William Johnson – For service to tertiary education.
- Jennifer Mary Jones – For service to family and child health nursing.
- Phillip Jones – For service to community mental health.
- Susan Grace Jones – For service to dance, and to environmental education.
- Janet Helen Judd – For service to conservation and the environment.
- Rosemary Kariuki – For service to the multicultural community.
- Stephen Stan Karsai – For service to veterans through a range of roles.
- Desma Lorraine Kearsey – For service to the community of Inverell.
- Glen Kelly – For service to the Indigenous community of Western Australia.
- Nicholas Kelly – For service to the clothing manufacturing sector, and to philanthropy.
- William John Kelly – For service to the community of Orange.
- Jennifer Avriel Kemarre Martiniello – For service to the creative and visual arts.
- Pauline Elizabeth Kenny – For service to primary education.
- David Kent – For service to the visual arts.
- Jonathan Leslie King – For service to community history.
- Vivianne Kissane – For service to community mental health.
- Francis Joseph Kitcher – For service to tennis, and to rugby league.
- Lilian Kow – For service to bariatric and obesity medicine.
- Anna Maria Krohn – For service to the Catholic Church of Australia.
- Helena Kyriazopoulos – For service to the multicultural community of South Australia.
- Colin William Laing – For service to surf lifesaving.
- Peter Archibald Laird – For service to the community of the Carrathool shire.
- Alan Owen Landis – For service to the decorative and fine arts.
- Peter John Langkamp – For service to social welfare organisations.
- David John Langworthy – For service to the community through a range of roles.
- Christopher Peter Latham – For service to the performing arts, particularly to music.
- David Anthony Lavell – For service to the community of Mundaring.
- Andrew Lawrence – For service to microbiology.
- Rosalind Elizabeth Lazar – For service to the international community of Mozambique.
- Caroline Lee – For service to the performing arts.
- Peter Hugh Lee – For service to community housing initiatives, and to architecture.
- Philip Keith Lee – For service to community history.
- Therese Anne Lee – For service to nursing.
- Felicia Leonardos – For service to the Greek community of Victoria.
- Nicole Elise Lopes – For service to little athletics.
- Steven Lopes – For service to little athletics.
- Dorothy Jean Lord – For service to the community of Tasmania.
- Justine Lorenz – For service to people who are deaf/blind.
- Francis James Lynch – For service to the community, and to the law.
- Frederick John Lynch – For service to veterans, and to the community.
- Emma Siobhan MacDonald – For service to journalism, and to women.
- Gordon Donald MacDonald – For service to naval architecture.
- William Samuel Mackieson – For service to the community through a range of roles.
- Sarah Louise Maguire – For services to clinical psychology and community health.
- Judith Anne Malcolm – For service to sport in a range of roles.
- Jon Mamonski – For service to the community of Geelong.
- Iris Mannik – For service to the community of Beechworth.
- Ferdinando Francesco Manno – For service to veterans.
- Barrymore Hardey Markham – For service to the community, and to aviation.
- Donna Claire Markham – For service to health administration.
- Catherine Marriott – For service to primary industry, and to regional development.
- Francis Kelly Marriott – For service to the Catholic Church of Australia.
- John Frederick Marriott – For service to the sheep breeding industry.
- Laurence James Marshbaum – For service to the community through philanthropic initiatives.
- Holly-Ann Martin – For service to child safety.
- John Martin – For service to community of Yeppoon.
- Dudley John Maslen – For service to the community of the Carnarvon region.
- Donald Ross Mason – For service to architecture.
- Andrew McBryde – For service to the Uniting Church in Australia.
- Victor Mannin McConvey – For service to people with Parkinson's, and to nursing.
- Matt McCracken – For service to people living with a disability.
- Derek James McDonnell – For service to cultural heritage, particularly to literature.
- Pamela Unice McGahey – For service to vocational education, and to the community.
- Jeffrey Daniel McGee – For service to the performing arts, and to radio.
- Peter Neilsen McGeoch – For service to sports medicine.
- Paul McGuinness – For service to the community of the Mornington Peninsula.
- Murray Stephen McHenry – For service to the hospitality industry, and to sport.
- Leah Jing McIntosh – For service to the arts as a writer and publisher.
- Stuart Vining McIntyre – For service to the community of Brighton.
- Rachel McKay – For service to the community of Cobram.
- Terence Patrick McKay – For service to the community through a range of roles.
- Darren James McLachlan – For service to swimming.
- Peter Alexander McMillan – For service to the community of Warrnambool.
- Robert James McMillan – For service to the community of Warrnambool.
- Deirdre Erma McNeil – For service to the Uniting Church in Australia.
- Robyn Mary McSweeney – For service to the people and Parliament of Western Australia.
- Kersi Meher-Homji – For service to the multicultural community, and to cricket.
- David Mercer – For service to the community through a range of roles.
- Peter Mercoulia – For service to the Greek community of Victoria.
- Mark Middleton – For service to medical administration.
- Michael James Millar – For service to the community through Lions International.
- Anne Maree Minato – For service to the community of the Eurobodalla.
- Dennis John Mitchell – For service to emergency response organisations.
- Heather Margaret Mitchell – For service to athletics.
- Margaret Laurel Mitchell – For service to emergency response organisations.
- Leanne Mits – For service to early childhood education.
- Anthony John Mogridge – For service to veterans and their families.
- David Clifford Moore – For service to ophthalmology.
- Kevin John Moss – For service to veterans and their families.
- Christopher Murray Moten – For service to general medicine, and to the community.
- Phillip Moulds – For service to secondary education.
- Sharyn Veronica Mullens Taylor – For service to amateur theatre.
- Michelle Janice Mulligan – For service to medicine, particularly to anaesthesia.
- Nancy Jean Murdock – For service to people with cancer, and to the community.
- Sally Murphy – For service to children's literature, and to education.
- William Michael Murphy – For service to the community of Cowra.
- Brian Peter Myerson – For service to community health, particularly organ donation.
- Marie Myssy – For service to the multicultural media.
- Lee Michelle Naylor – For service to athletics.
- Anne-Maree Newbold – For service to community mental health, and to the disability sector.
- Bruce Beaumont Newman – For service to the community of Mt Barker.
- Elizabeth Ann Newstead – For service to emergency response organisations.
- Graeme Alexander Nicholson – For service to community history and safety.
- Gail Elizabeth Nixon – For service to the community of the Central Highlands.
- Christine Sara Nolan – For service to social welfare organisations.
- Teresa Nowak – For service to the multicultural community of South Australia.
- Rosemary Patricia Nugent – For service to the communities of Geelong and Timor Leste.
- Rhonda Annette Nunns – For service to the community through a range of roles.
- Russell John Nuske – For service to the community of Murray Bridge.
- Nyadol Nyuon – For service to human rights and refugee women.
- Elizabeth Anne O'Donovan – For service to jazz and cabaret music.
- Linda Elizabeth Oke – For service to occupational therapy.
- Kevin Andrew O'Keefe – For service to Indigenous education.
- Maeve Catherine O'Meara – For service to the food media industry.
- Miri Orden – For service to the Jewish community of New South Wales.
- Graham Barry Osterfield – For service to the community of the Brisbane region.
- Nicolas Papazahariakis – For service to the hospitality industry.
- Helen Park – For service to water polo.
- Jacqueline Pascarl – For service to the community through a range of roles.
- Beryl Marcia Patullo – For service to the community through a range of roles.
- Lindsay David Patullo – For service to the community through a range of roles.
- Con Pavlou – For service to the multicultural community of New South Wales.
- John Marshall Pearce – For service to sport, and to philanthropy.
- Neville George Pengilly – For service to the community of Cowra.
- Geoffrey Douglas Penna – For service to the communities of Ararat and Elmhurst.
- Gael Maxine Perry – For service to multicultural aged care, and to the community.
- Jennifer Kay Phillips – For service to botanical art.
- Marilyn Phillips – For service to choral music.
- William Picken – For service to the horse racing industry.
- Kevin William Pitts – For service to veterans and their families.
- Clive Edgar Plater – For service to community history.
- James Leon Pozarik – For service to photography.
- Kim Suzanne Prodinger – For service to education, and to the community.
- David Geraint Pumphrey – For service to medical research and performing arts organisations.
- Sathya Rao – For service to psychiatry.
- Helen May Reid – For service to the community of Pakenham.
- Terry Reid – For service to the environment, and to the community.
- Robert James Richards – For service to the aquaculture industry.
- Ronda Richards – For service to the community of Nagambie.
- Jeff Richardson – For service to the performing arts, and to radio.
- Billie Joan Ridler – For service to the community of Tasmania.
- Patrick John Ringold – For service to naval veterans.
- Patricia Janet Rodrigues – For service to secondary education.
- Joan Kathleen Rose – For service to community health through voluntary roles.
- Margaret Isabel Rowe – For service to conservation and the environment.
- William David Rubinstein – For service to tertiary education, and to Jewish history.
- Angela Ryan – For service to the Catholic Church of Australia.
- Cornelius James Ryan – For service to the community through a range of organisations.
- Judy Ryan – For service to community health through a range of programs.
- Laurence Francis Ryan – For service to the community of Barwon Heads.
- Kirli Rae Saunders – For service to the arts, particularly to literature.
- Alan Everitt Seale – For service to the community through a range of roles.
- Shira Nina Sebban – For service to the Jewish community through a range of roles.
- Anna Senior – For service to the visual arts through costume design.
- Smita Shah – For service to community health.
- Janelle Ann Shakespeare – For service to medical research organisations.
- Naomi Barbara Sharp – For service to the creative arts as a ceramicist.
- Michael Joseph Sheahan – For service to sports journalism.
- Robert Vivian Shewring – For service to veterans and their families.
- Kevin James Short – For service to the community of Maitland.
- Shillar Sibanda – For service to the African community of Victoria.
- Gurpreet Pinky Singh – For service to the community through a range of roles.
- Dorothy June Smith – For service to the community through philanthropic roles.
- Jillian Isobelle Smith – For service to the community, and to education.
- Marjorie Smith – For service to the community of Dandenong.
- Robert John Smith – For service to veterans, and to the community.
- Stephanie Smyth – For service to the community of Adelong.
- Hector Simon Soans – For service to the Anglo-Indian community of Australia.
- Suzanne Janet South – For service to community history.
- David Speakman – For service to medicine, particularly cancer treatment.
- John Spink – For service to Indigenous community health.
- Howard Garry Spry – For service to the community of Queenscliffe.
- Carolyn Anne Stedman – For service to children particularly as a foster parent.
- David Eric Stedman – For service to children particularly as a foster parent.
- Jennifer Stedmon – For service to medicine in the field of anaesthesia.
- Steven Stefanopoulos – For service to the community in a range of roles.
- Oleg Stepanov – For service to the performing arts, particularly to piano.
- Terence Leland Stern – For service to the law through legal societies.
- Dayle Joanne Stevens – For service to information technology, and to women.
- Judee Stevenson – For service to older persons through volunteering.
- Ian Leonard Stiles – For service to the community of Jurien Bay.
- Wayne Leslie Stuart – For service to the community of Yass.
- Glendra Stubbs – For service to the Indigenous community of New South Wales.
- Beryl Amelia Sutcliffe – For service to the community, and to education.
- Christian Scott Sutherland – For service to medicine as a general surgeon.
- Ingrid Svendsen – For service to charitable organisations.
- James Frances Taafe – For service to swimming, and to tenpin bowling.
- Anton Tagliaferro – For service to charitable organisations, and to the investment sector.
- Daniella Taglieri – For service to youth through Scouts, and to education.
- Maria Rosaria Tarzia – For service to charitable organisations.
- Dexter Ernest Taylor – For service to the community through a range of roles.
- Margaret Ann Taylor – For service to the community of the Sapphire Coast.
- Marie Jane Taylor – For service to community health.
- Bradley John Teal – For service to sport, and to the community.
- Jack Renton Thomas – For service to veterans and their families.
- John Michael Thomas – For service to the community, and to business.
- Russell James Thomter – For service to the visual arts, particularly to photography.
- Brenda Anastasia Thornell – For service to the community of the Mornington Peninsula.
- Jennifer Jane Toisuta – For service to asylum seekers and refugees.
- David Tomlinson – For service to cricket.
- Peter Douglas Toms – For service to the community through a range of roles.
- Karen Toscan – For service to veterans, and to the community.
- Peta Christine Townsing – For service to emergency response organisations.
- Walter James Trenorden – For service to veterans and their families.
- Judith Marion Tuckey – For service to the community of Mandurah.
- Corey Tutt – For service to Indigenous STEM education.
- Julianne Tyson – For service to the aquaculture industry.
- Karolyn Vaughan – For service to nursing.
- Sydney Villis – For service to emergency response organisations.
- Velta Vingelis – For service to tertiary education.
- Natasha Vlassenko – For service to the performing arts, particularly to piano.
- Adrian Walsh – For service to youth through Scouts.
- Brian Joseph Walters – For service to veterans through a range of roles.
- Peter John Ward – For service to the law, and to the community.
- Neville Warwick – For service to surf lifesaving, and to the community.
- David Neil Watkins – For service to medical tertiary education.
- Stephanie Louise Watson – For service to ophthalmology.
- Janice Beverly Watt – For service to women, and to public administration.
- Dorothy West – For service to first nations media and communications.
- Liesel Wett – For service to medical administration.
- Fay Constance Wheatley – For service to veterans, and to the community.
- Daniel John White – For service to education.
- Frederick Michael White – For service to youth, and to the community.
- Toni Leigh White – For service to family history organisations.
- James William Whitworth – For service to the aviation industry.
- Russell Robert Wight – For service to cricket.
- Brian John Williams – For service to emergency response organisations.
- Ellen Theresa Williams – For service to the performing arts.
- Peter Leslie Williams – For service to the performing arts.
- Barbara Anne Wilson – For service to the environmental sciences, and to tertiary education.
- Bruce McKinley Wilson – For service to athletics.
- Geoffrey Ronald Wilson – For service to the visual arts.
- Kevin Winkleman – For service to veterans and their families.
- Phillip John Winney – For service to veterans and their families.
- Margaret Ann Youl – For service to aged persons.

==== Military Division ====
Navy

- Warrant Officer Thomas Stuart Costello – For meritorious service to the Submarine and Surface Forces as a Warrant Officer supporting improved workplace relationships, technical mastery and empowerment.
- Chief Petty Officer Daniel John Elliott – For meritorious service as a Royal Australian Navy Clearance Diver within Tactical Assault Group - East, 2nd Commando Regiment, during the period March 2004 to January 2020.
- Warrant Officer Graeme John Gibney – For meritorious performance of duty as a Senior Enlisted leader in the Australian Defence Force.
- Captain Gavin John Irwin, RAN – For meritorious performance of duty as the Superintendent Garden Island Dockyard Precinct.
- Lieutenant Commander Michael Desmond Woods, RAN (Retd.) – For meritorious service in support of current and ex-serving Navy People and their families.

Army

- Warrant Officer Class Two B – For meritorious service within Special Operations Command as a Senior Instructor and Company Sergeant Major.
- Warrant Officer Class One Bradley Scott Bargenquast – For meritorious service as the Regimental Sergeant Major of the 11th Combat Service Support Battalion, 1st Combat Signal Regiment and Royal Military College - Duntroon.
- Major Gary Raymond Edwards – For meritorious performance of duty as the Officer Commanding Maritime Wing and Second in Command of both the Army School of Transport and Second in Command 10th Force Support Battalion.
- Warrant Officer Class Two Cameron Joseph Elliott – For meritorious service as an Explosives Detection Dog Chief Trainer, Explosives Detection Dog Capability Manager and Sergeant Major - Warrant Officer Training.
- Warrant Officer Class One Jason Richard Hartley – For meritorious performance of duty in petroleum operations and operational force generation for the Australian Army.
- Warrant Officer Class One Scott Andrew Rutland – For meritorious service and exceptional commitment to the continuous advancement of Military Personnel Administration.
- Warrant Officer Class One S – For meritorious service to the Australian Army as a Warrant Officer and Regimental Sergeant Major.
- Warrant Officer Class One Kirstin Arina Tanner – For meritorious service as the Company Sergeant Major 11th Close Health Company, and as the Regimental Sergeant Major of the 1st Close Health Battalion and the 1st Combat Service Support Battalion.
- Warrant Officer Class One Michael Leonard Waters – For meritorious service in senior Artificer Sergeant Major roles inside Army Headquarters and Special Operations Command.

Air Force

- Warrant Officer Sean Andrew McClure – For meritorious service to the Australian Defence Force Remotely Piloted Aircraft Systems operations, and in MQ-9B Sky Guardian capability development.
- Wing Commander Michael John O'Donoghue – For meritorious service in aviation medicine for the Australian Defence Force.
- Wing Commander Colin Bruce Walker – For meritorious performance of duty in Air Mobility capability development and assurance for the Australian Defence Force.
- Flight Lieutenant Shaun Robert Wilkinson – For meritorious performance of duty in capability development of the C-130J Super Hercules medium-sized tactical transport aircraft for the Australian Defence Force.

==== Honorary Division ====
- David James Bussey – For service to the community through history preservation organisations.
- Ann Mary Crawford – For service to youth through the Youth Hostels Association.

== Meritorious Service ==
=== Public Service Medal (PSM) ===
Public Service Medal ribbon

Federal

- Malcolm David Adams, AM – For outstanding public service in reforming and leading significant Major Acquisitions and Sustainment programs in Navy Ship Building.
- Michael Paul Bath – For outstanding public service to support Australia's finance and securitisation market, during the 2008 financial crisis and the COVID-19 pandemic.
- Dr Sally Box – For outstanding public service for her exceptional leadership in guiding the Australian Government's environmental response to the 2019-20 Black Summer bushfires.
- Robert Patrick Bryson – For outstanding public service for his sustained role in the logistic and asset improvement and modernisation of Australia's operational Antarctic program.
- Alistair Lachlan Campbell – For outstanding public service in providing critical and innovative data support and analytical services which underpinned the whole-of-government COVID-19 response with outstanding contribution and sustained effort in support of the government.
- Samantha Elizabeth Chard – For outstanding public service in establishing Australia's Radioactive Waste Agency and identifying a suitable site for a permanent radioactive waste management facility.
- Professor Phillip Randolph Cummins – For outstanding public service in scientific leadership in pioneering and leading research programs to reduce risk from earthquakes and tsunamis in Australia and the Asia-Pacific.
- Michelle Julie Curry (Ainsworth) – For outstanding public service in promoting the respectful use of the Ngunnawal language across ABC Canberra.
- Jacqueline Ann Curtis – For outstanding public service in driving change and building capability in the Australian Public Service as inaugural Head of the APS Human Resources Profession.
- Dr Lucas de Toca – For outstanding public service through leadership in managing the successful COVID- 19 vaccine rollout through primary health care.
- Darren Dick – For outstanding public service in the development of a significant and influential body of research and policy development.
- Teresa Ann Dickinson – For outstanding public service in the development of data and statistics, in particular for her instrumental role and sustained level of service in delivering the 2021 Census of Population and Housing.
- Niamh Marie Dobson – For outstanding public service through her work in managing Australia's relationship with Gavi, the Vaccine Alliance, particularly in supporting and establishing the global COVAX Facility.
- Joanne Leigh Evans – For outstanding public service in leading the development and implementation of Australia's climate policies, including building partnerships across government to provide robust evidence based policy.
- Susan Helen Flanagan – For outstanding public service in leading the largest consular response in Australian history by facilitating the safe return of Australians during the COVID-19 pandemic.
- Jodie Leanne Grieve – For outstanding public service through leadership in managing the national public health communications response to the COVID-19 pandemic.
- June Kaye Homan – For outstanding public service in leading complex ICT system services for the Australian Government.
- Penelope Ireland – For outstanding public service in the design and successful implementation of three COVID-19 response initiatives - the Jobs Hub, Workforce Contact Centre and Employer Response Unit.
- Dr Elisabeth Alexandra Kerr – For outstanding public service to the health and wellbeing of Australians, primarily for work as the scientific force behind the regulation of breast implants globally.
- Rebekah Ruth Kilpatrick – For outstanding public service in leading the development and launch of the National Strategy to Prevent and Respond to Child Sexual Abuse 2021-2030 and its associated First Commonwealth Action Plan and First National Action Plan.
- Alison Dell Larkins – For outstanding public service in policy innovation and leadership to enhance settlement outcomes for refugees and migrants.
- Helen Zeta McCormack – For outstanding public service to Australia's agriculture sector, particularly in addressing critical workforce shortages following the outbreak of the COVID-19 pandemic.
- Garrett McDonald – For outstanding public service in performing a leadership role during the bushfires and COVID-19 crises, being instrumental in quickly developing new capability to allow Services Australia to respond to unprecedented levels of demand.
- Lisa Michelle Peterson – For outstanding public service leading the national aged care COVID-19 vaccination rollout for senior Australians and workers in residential aged care in 2021.
- Danielle Joy Regeling – For outstanding public service to Service Australia's support for Australians during the COVID-19 pandemic, navigating between Services Australia and primary partners including the Department of Health and national Health Providers.
- Michael Roy Ryan – For outstanding public service in leading the legislative requirements that facilitated the rapid expansion of telehealth services recognised by Medicare in response to the COVID-19 pandemic.
- Daniel Thomas Sloper – For outstanding public service in leading the Government's Crisis Response Team on the ground in Kabul, Afghanistan and the United Arab Emirates.
- Simon Joseph Writer – For outstanding public service in delivering an extensive legislative program, including comprehensive legislation packages in response to the Financial Services Royal Commission and the Government's economic response to the COVID-19 pandemic.

New South Wales

- Jennifer Anne Agius – For outstanding public service to the New South Wales Ombudsman.
- Melissa Attia – For outstanding service to the Cumberland City Council during the COVID-19 pandemic.
- Irene Chetty – For outstanding public service to the Muswellbrook Shire Council, in water and wastewater management.
- Robert Anthony Clarke – For outstanding public service to social housing in New South Wales.
- Jeremy Maxwell Cox – For outstanding public service to the people of New South Wales.
- Rosemary Helen Davidson – For outstanding public service to the Children's Court of New South Wales.
- Simon Kevin Draper – For outstanding public service to Infrastructure New South Wales during the COVID- 19 pandemic.
- Caroline Farmer – For outstanding public service to New South Wales Health, particularly during the COVID-19 pandemic.
- Amanda Elizabeth Farrar – For outstanding public service to arts and culture in New South Wales.
- Dr John Kenneth Ferguson – For outstanding service to NSW Health, particularly during the COVID-19 pandemic.
- Cristien Hickey – For outstanding public service to climate change policy in New South Wales.
- Fiona Leatham – For outstanding public service the City of Newcastle during the COVID-19 pandemic.
- William James Murphy – For outstanding public service to NSW, particularly during the COVID-19 pandemic.
- Paul Orlando Nunnari – For outstanding public service to New South Wales, particularly in the field of access and inclusion.
- Vicki Anne Simpson – For outstanding public service to the Mid North Coast Local Health District, particularly during the COVID-19 pandemic.
- Deborah Margaret Summerhayes – For outstanding public service to education in NSW.
- Dr Kim Liane Sutherland – For outstanding public service to NSW Health, particularly during the COVID-19 pandemic.
- Michael John Thompson – For outstanding public service to Queanbeyan-Palerang Regional Council.

Victoria

- Argiri Alisandratos – For outstanding public service to the community, particularly to Victoria's most vulnerable.
- Pitsa Binnion – For outstanding public service to education in Victoria.
- Geoffrey Philip Block – For outstanding public service to education in Victoria.
- Claire Jennifer Boardman – For outstanding public service to health in Victoria, particularly for the COVID-19 response.
- John Bradley – For outstanding public service to strategic policy reform and delivery in Victoria, particularly in the areas of energy and natural resource management.
- Genevieve Mary Dolan – For outstanding public service in the delivery of communications in Victoria, particularly for the COVID-19 response.
- Associate Professor Nadia Deborah Friedman – For outstanding public service to health in Victoria, particularly for the COVID-19 response.
- Marcus John Horwood – For outstanding public service to community health and safety in Victoria.
- Kate Alexandra Houghton – For outstanding public service to policy and program delivery in Victoria, particularly in the area of community health.
- Stanislav Antun Krpan – For outstanding public service to policy and program delivery, particularly in the areas of environmental and social policy.
- David Julian Stockman – For outstanding public service in the delivery of communications in Victoria, particularly for the COVID-19 response.
- Helen Marie-Therese Vaughan – For outstanding public service to policy and program delivery in Victoria, particularly in the area of natural resource management.
- Dr Alexandra Elizabeth West – For outstanding public service to Victoria Police, particularly in mental health.

Queensland

- Paula Maree Duffy – For outstanding public service in nursing and the response to the COVID-19 pandemic.
- Sally-Ann Edwards – For outstanding public service for the Isisford community.
- Dianne Michelle Francisco – For outstanding public service in environmental and public health services, particularly during the COVID-19 pandemic and flood events.
- Todd Anthony Harris – For outstanding public service in Queensland's sporting and major events, particularly through the COVID-19 pandemic.
- David Newby – For outstanding public service in whole-of-government financial reporting.
- Maree Ann Parker – For outstanding public service in regional development, infrastructure planning and delivery and disaster economic recovery.
- Professor Ajay Rane, OAM – For outstanding public service in women's health in Queensland.

Western Australia

- Angela Kelly – For outstanding public service in the Western Australian health system, particularly during the COVID-19 pandemic.
- Joanne Maree Stampalia – For outstanding public service in operational reform and modernisation of the Courts and Tribunals of Western Australia.
- Raymond William Warnes – For outstanding public service in leading significant organisational reform of the Western Australian Corruption and Crime Commission.

South Australia

- Dr Thomas James Dodd – For outstanding public service and world-class innovation and leadership in pathology services across South Australia.
- David Glen Reynolds – For outstanding public service on South Australia's economic and financial response, during the COVID-19 pandemic.
- Fiona Ward – For outstanding public service in child protection and community services for children and families in South Australia
- Janet Gai Willoughby – For outstanding public service in developing public urban spaces and a community gardening movement for the City of Charles Sturt.

Tasmania

- Jennifer Patsy Gale – For outstanding public service during the COVID-19 pandemic.
- Commissioner Darren Leigh Hine, AO, APM – For outstanding public service in emergency management during the COVID-19 pandemic.
- Kathrine Louise Morgan-Wicks – For outstanding public service in health leadership and reform during the COVID-19 pandemic.
- Dr Mark George Veitch – For outstanding public service during the COVID-19 pandemic.

Australian Capital Territory

- Dr Damian Paul West – For outstanding public service and strategic leadership and development of the Australian Capital Territory Public Service.

=== Australian Police Medal (APM) ===
Australian Police Medal ribbon

Federal

- Detective Sergeant Scott Andrew Mellis
- Assistant Commissioner Nigel Patrick Ryan

New South Wales

- Superintendent Karen Rachel Cook
- Chief Inspector Stephen Leslie Fowler
- Assistant Commissioner Brett Reginald Greentree
- Detective Inspector Kirsty Anne Hales
- Superintendent Donna Anne McCarthy
- Assistant Commissioner Brett Anthony McFadden
- Detective Superintendent Michael Andrew McLean
- Detective Sergeant Mark Anthony Meredith, OAM
- Superintendent David Paul Roptell
- Detective Chief Inspector Brett John Smith

Victoria

- Detective Inspector Gregory Brian Bowd
- Superintendent Timothy John Day
- Sergeant Glenn Bradley Holland
- Inspector Andrew Markakis
- Commander Karen Nyholm
- Superintendent Mark Stephen Porter
- Leading Senior Constable Graham Keith Shoobert
- Commander Timothy Austin Tully
- Superintendent Peter John Ward

Queensland

- Senior Sergeant Gary Robert Hunter
- Sergeant Paul Thomas James
- Sergeant William Thomas Johnson
- Senior Sergeant Richard Craig McIntosh
- Detective Senior Sergeant Emma Judy Novosel
- Detective Inspector Leonie Maree Steyger

Western Australia

- Senior Constable Kylie Jane Bell
- Senior Sergeant Glenn Charles Dowding
- Detective Inspector Quentin Flatman
- Superintendent Noel Patrick Gartlan
- Sergeant Kylie Marie Velios
- Commander Scott Matthew Warner

South Australia

- Constable Deborah Louise Gibson
- Superintendent Paul William Roberts
- Senior Sergeant First Class Grant Francis Watterson

Tasmania

- Commander Robert Colin Godfrey Blackwood
- Inspector James David Semmens

Northern Territory

- Detective Sergeant Annette Mary Cooper

=== Australian Fire Service Medal (AFSM) ===
AFSM ribbon

New South Wales

- Louis Anthony Cassar
- Brendan James Cox
- Scott Andrew Crosweller
- Krystaal Meta Hinds
- Dr Kamarah Pooley
- John Patrick Reed
- John Corneille Smith
- William Allan Spek
- Gregory Wayne Topple
- Brett Stanley Turner
- Frederick Allan Turner
- Barry Whalan

Victoria

- Roger Stewart Chitty
- John Laurence Cowan
- Richard Andrew Cromb
- Alistair Murray Drayton
- James William Dullard
- Debra Michelle Luke
- Philip John Taylor

Queensland

- Mark Doble
- Commissioner Gregory James Leach

Western Australia

- Jonathan McLean Broomhall
- Harold James Moir
- Alan Gordon Pugh
- Michael Teraci

South Australia

- Brendan Patrick McEvoy
- Nathan James Watts

Australian Capital Territory

- Peter Ronald Coble
- Matthew Charles Dutkiewicz
- Gregory Stephen Potts

=== Ambulance Service Medal (ASM) ===
ASM ribbon

New South Wales

- Wayne Robert Cannon
- Mark Roy Gibbs

Queensland

- Grant Richard Gamble

Western Australia

- Wendy Lee-Ann Price
- Ian James Telfer
- Craig Ronald Telford

South Australia

- Julie Margaret Appay
- John Lyndon Noble
- Shaun Andrew Whales
- Catherine Anne Wright

Tasmania

- Glenn John Aslin

Australian Capital Territory

- Peter Andrew Le Lievre

Northern Territory

- Taleaha Jane Dawson
- Craig Garraway
- Andrew David Thomas

=== Emergency Services Medal (ESM) ===
ESM ribbon

New South Wales

- Gregory John Davies
- Assistant Commissioner Nicole Joy Hogan
- Assistant Commissioner Sean Michael Kearns
- Paul Colin McQueen
- Caron Lynette Parfitt
- James Ernest Wright

Victoria

- Neil Raymond Cooper
- Dr Natalie Anne Hood
- Josephine Ann Hunter
- John Takac
- Kylie Michelle Trott

Queensland

- Elliott Dunn

Western Australia

- Christopher Craig Brien
- Patrick William Shinnick
- Kenneth John Summers

South Australia

- Ben Mason Martin
- Andrew Peter Sullivan

Australian Capital Territory

- Tammy Raylene Bennett
- Cameron Beresford
- Stephen Douglas Forbes
- Nathan Daniel Henderson-Smith
- Adrian Gordon Manning
- Philip Lawrence Nolen

=== Australian Corrections Medal (ACM) ===
ACM ribbon

New South Wales

- Walid Adel (Wally) Elguindy
- Kerrie Anne Mosman
- Gregory John Rapley
- Sarah Elizabeth Riley-Marsh
- Governor Adam Christopher Wilkinson

Victoria

- Sibel Bulus
- Michael Norman Link
- Andrea Joy Lynch
- Gary John Taylor

Queensland

- Peter William Coyne
- Nicole Anne Duke
- Antony John Tarlowski
- Robert James Wood

Western Australia

- Carrol Johns

South Australia

- Sky Marie Lambert

Australian Capital Territory

- Jason Bernard Russell

== Distinguished and Conspicuous Service ==
=== Distinguished Service Medal (DSM) ===
Distinguished Service Medal ribbon

Army

- Brigadier Todd Andrew Ashurst – For distinguished leadership in warlike operations as the Commander Task Group Afghanistan and North Atlantic Treaty Organisation Resolute Support Mission Chief of Combined Joint Operations, on Operation HIGHROAD from September 2020 to June 2021.
- Lieutenant Colonel Scott William Holmes – For distinguished leadership in warlike operations as the Commanding Officer of the deployed Ready Battle Group during the Afghanistan Non-Combatant Evacuation Operation in August 2021.
- Captain J – For distinguished leadership in warlike operations as the commander of the Special Operations Planning Team during the evacuation of designated personnel, including Australian Nationals and Approved Foreign Nationals, from Hamid Karzai International Airport, Kabul Afghanistan over the period 17–25 August 2021.
- Major J – For distinguished leadership in warlike operations in supporting Australian and Iraqi Counter Terrorism operations whilst deployed on Operation AUGURY in Iraq from November 2020 to May 2021.

Air Force

- Wing Commander Steven Graham Duffy – For distinguished leadership in warlike operations as the Joint Task Force 633 Forward Liaison Officer during the Afghanistan Non-Combatant Evacuation Operations in August 2021.
- Group Captain John Gordon Young – For distinguished leadership in warlike operations as the Operation RESOLUTE SUPPORT Mission Senior Air Advisor Ministerial Advisory Group and concurrently as the Commander Train, Advise, Assist Command - Air on Operation HIGHROAD from October 2020 to May 2021.

=== Commendation for Distinguished Service ===
Commendation for Distinguished Service ribbon

Army

- Trooper B – For distinguished performance of duties in warlike operations as a member of the Special Operations Planning Team during the evacuation of Australian Nationals and Approved Foreign Nationals, from Hamid Karzai International Airport, Kabul over the period 17–25 August 2021.
- Trooper D – For distinguished performance of duties in warlike operations in enabling Australian and Coalition Counter Terrorism operations whilst deployed on Operation AUGURY in Iraq from November 2020 to May 2021.
- Major Matthew David Hamill – For distinguished performance of duties in warlike operations as National Support Element commander, Operations Officer and Officer Commanding Force Protection Element 15 of Task Group Afghanistan on Operation HIGHROAD from January to June 2021.
- Colonel Andrew George Harrison-Wyatt – For distinguished performance of duties in warlike operations as the Operation RESOLUTE SUPPORT Director of Logistics for the Special Operations Component Command - Afghanistan on Operation HIGHROAD from August 2020 to May 2021.
- Corporal N – For distinguished performance of duties in warlike operations as a Team Commander on operations over the period December 2020 to June 2021.
- Corporal S – For distinguished performance of duties in warlike operations as a member of the Special Operations Planning Team during the evacuation of Australian Nationals and Approved Foreign Nationals, from Hamid Karzai International Airport, Kabul over the period 17–25 August 2021.
- Brigadier Simeon Luke Ward, CSC – For distinguished performance of duties in warlike operations as the Director of Future Operations in Headquarters Combined Joint Task Force - Operation INHERENT RESOLVE, on Operation OKRA from October 2020 to August 2021.

Royal Australian Air Force

- Group Captain Ruth Patricia Elsley, CSC – For distinguished performance of duties in warlike operations as the Senior Gender Advisor, Resolute Support Mission on Operation HIGHROAD from October 2020 to June 2021.

=== Bar to the Conspicuous Service Cross (CSC and Bar) ===
Conspicuous Service Cross and Bar ribbon

Navy

- Commander Mark Raymond Tandy, CSC, RAN – For outstanding devotion to duty as the Officer in Charge Navy Indigenous Development Program.

Army

- Colonel Stuart Nicholas Kenny, CSC, DSM – For outstanding devotion to duty in the areas of Operational planning for the Australian Defence Force, in particular as the Director of Joint Collective Training in Headquarters Joint Operations Command.

=== Conspicuous Service Cross (CSC) ===
Conspicuous Service Cross ribbon

Navy

- Captain Adrian Jude Capner, RAN – For outstanding achievement in organisational reform and aviation capability acquisition for the Australian Defence Force.
- Lieutenant Commander Glen Barry Edwards, RAN – For outstanding achievement in the integration of the E-7A Wedgetail airspace battle management capability into the Joint Force, and E-7A operational planning for the Australian Defence Force.
- Captain Andrew Scott MacAlister, RAN – For outstanding achievement in cyber capability development for the Australian Defence Force.
- Chief Petty Officer Luke Anthony Masterson – For outstanding achievement in the performance of duty as the Deputy Marine Engineering Officer HMAS Waller.
- Rear Admiral Michael James Rothwell, AM RAN – For outstanding devotion to duty as the Commander Joint Task Force 633 on Operations OKRA, HIGHROAD and ACCORDION from November 2020 to August 2021.
- Captain Matthew Martin Shand, RAN – For outstanding devotion to duty as the Commanding Officer of HMAS Kuttabul.
- Captain David Jason Tietzel, CSM, RAN – For outstanding devotion to duty as Deputy Commodore Flotillas from September 2018 until November 2020.

Army

- Lieutenant Colonel Mathew Phillip Brooks – For outstanding devotion to duty as Army's Principal Ammunition Technical Officer.
- Lieutenant Colonel Clarke Morey Brown – For outstanding achievement as the Commanding Officer/Chief Instructor of the Army School of Transport.
- Colonel Stuart Nolan Cree – For outstanding achievement as Director Training Systems - Army, in driving training systems towards a single system that generates joint capability for Australia.
- Lieutenant Colonel Kelly Anne Dunne – For outstanding achievement as the Staff Officer Grade One Health Workforce, Capability and Training in the Directorate of Army Health.
- Private Natasha Ailish Evans – For outstanding achievement in Imagery Analysis in support of the United States Central Command Partner Integration Enterprise on Operation OKRA from 29 December 2020 to 15 July 2021.
- Lieutenant Colonel Fabian Ronald Harrison, DSM – For outstanding achievement as the Brigade Major of the 6th Brigade during 2020–2021.
- Lieutenant Colonel Christopher Bowen Johnston – For outstanding achievement in the application of exceptional skills, judgement, leadership and dedication in the advancement of counter-intelligence and intelligence collection, analysis, assessment and dissemination within the Australian Defence Force.
- Lieutenant Colonel Gerard Ryan Kearns – For outstanding achievement as the Commanding Officer of the 3rd Battalion, the Royal Australian Regiment
- Sergeant L – For outstanding devotion to duty for Joint Terminal Attack Control management across Special Operations Command.
- Lieutenant Colonel Helen Elizabeth Mammino – For outstanding achievement as the Commanding Officer of the 6th Aviation Regiment.
- Lieutenant Colonel Adam Nathanial Reimers – For outstanding achievement in the application of skills and knowledge as the Staff Officer Grade One, Combat Arms Trades and Training.
- Lieutenant Colonel Karl John Reynolds – For outstanding achievement in support of the Australian Government contribution to the Pacific Step-Up Initiative.
- Lieutenant Colonel Josephine Lee Richards – For outstanding achievement as a Commanding Officer of 8th Combat Service Support Battalion force assigned to Operation Bushfire Assist and as the Commanding Officer of Joint Task Unit 629.1.1 on Operation COVID-19 Assist.
- Major Geoffrey Mark Slavin – For outstanding achievement as the Officer Commanding Charlie Company 51st Battalion, Far North Queensland Regiment and Officer Commanding Joint Task Force 639.2.1 during Operation RESOLUTE in the Torres Strait during 2020–2021.
- Lieutenant Colonel Andrew Tristan White – For outstanding achievement as the Staff Officer Grade 1 - Plans of Joint Task Force 1110 during Operation Bushfire Assist 2020, and as the Commanding Officer of Joint Task Unit 629.1.3 during Operation COVID-19 Assist 2020.

Air Force

- Group Captain Daniel Robert Cassilles – For outstanding devotion to duty in training management and organisational development at Officers' Training School, Royal Australian Air Force.
- Squadron Leader Simon William Chittleborough – For outstanding achievement in engineering maintenance management at Number 33 Squadron.
- Group Captain Louise Elizabeth Desjardins – For outstanding achievement in the performance of duty as Director Joint Effects and Targeting in Headquarters Joint Operations Command for the Australian Defence Force.
- Wing Commander Dougal James Dow – For outstanding achievement in the application of skills and judgement as the Air Force lead for the Loyal Wingman project
- Squadron Leader Lauren Guest – For outstanding achievement in enhancing the logistics officer specialisation, and in leadership within Number 17 Squadron and Royal Australian Air Force Base Tindal.
- Wing Commander Garth Rohan Herriot – For outstanding achievement as Commanding Officer Expeditionary Airbase Operations Unit Eight on Operation ACCORDION from October 2020 to April 2021.
- Flight Sergeant Daniel Anthony Hickey – For outstanding devotion to duty in space-based missile warning development and operationalisation for the Australian Defence Force.
- Squadron Leader Justin Wayne Hill – For outstanding devotion to duty in AP-3C Orion and P-8A Poseidon maritime patrol aircraft maintenance and engineering support.
- Corporal Joseph Edward Kelly – For outstanding achievement in establishing centralised aircraft Tow Motor training for Australian Defence Force aviation technicians during Initial Employment Training.
- Wing Commander Adrian James Kiely – For outstanding achievement in securing improved future air combat capability outcomes for F 35A Lightning II as the Future Requirements Officer in the Air Combat Transition Office, Royal Australian Air Force.
- Squadron Leader Robert Peter McMullan – For outstanding achievement in F-35A Lightning II Joint Strike Fighter weapons system engineering certification and component acquisition for the Australian Defence Force.
- Squadron Leader Neale Douglas Thompson – For outstanding achievement in MQ-4C Triton long endurance high-altitude unmanned aerial vehicle capability development for the Royal Australian Air Force.

=== Bar to the Conspicuous Service Medal (CSM and Bar) ===
Conspicuous Service Medal and bar ribbon

Army

- Lieutenant Colonel Paul John Bellas, CSM – For meritorious achievement in the reform of organisation management in the Australian Army.
- Colonel James Robert Burns, CSM – For meritorious achievement as Director Veterans Engagement in Defence People Group.

=== Conspicuous Service Medal (CSM) ===
Conspicuous Service Medal ribbon

Navy

- Chief Petty Officer Andrew Barr – For meritorious devotion to duty as a Royal Australian Navy Clearance Diver within Tactical Assault Group - East, 2nd Commando Regiment, during October 2004 to March 2020.
- Lieutenant David James Edgell, RAN – For meritorious devotion to duty as the Deputy Weapons Engineering Manager at Fleet Support Unit - West.
- Chief Petty Officer Eduardo Andres Espinoza – For meritorious devotion to duty and exceptional leadership as the Senior High Power Marine Technician in HMAS Adelaide.
- Leading Seaman Aaron Graeme Hill – For meritorious devotion to duty as Communications Supervisor at Australian Clearance Diving Team Four.
- Chief Petty Officer Shayne Kessey – For meritorious achievement to the Royal Australian Navy in the fields of personnel and technical seaworthiness management.
- Lieutenant Commander Raymond Francis McErlean, RAN – For meritorious achievement in the performance of duty as a Flight Commander in HMAS Melbourne.
- Chief Petty Officer Clinton Gregory Metcalfe – For meritorious achievement as the Royal Australian Navy Technical Advisor to Kiribati.
- Chief Petty Officer Glen Andrew Smithers – For meritorious achievement as the Royal Australian Navy Technical Advisor to Tuvalu.
- Warrant Officer Danny Taylor – For meritorious achievement in the enhancement of the Technical Secondment program and the development of Technical Mastery in the Royal Australian Navy and nations of the Pacific.

Army

- Sergeant A – For meritorious devotion to duty as a Troop Sergeant, Signals Troop, 1 Commando Regiment.
- Major Benjamin William Angus – For meritorious achievement as the Officer Commanding Administration Company, 7th Battalion, the Royal Australian Regiment.
- Major Andrew Michael Boyd – For meritorious achievement as the Staff Officer Grade Two Land Vehicle Safety Cell within Army Headquarters
- Major Ben Graham Caligari – For meritorious devotion to duty in his role supporting the capability development of the Australian Defence Force joint intelligence, surveillance and reconnaissance warfighting network.
- Major Larissa Maree Cody – For meritorious achievement in leadership and management at the Australian Defence Force Academy.
- Major John Robert Crockett – For meritorious achievement as the Deputy Chief Instructor of the Royal Military College - Duntroon.
- Major Karl Dadds – For meritorious achievement as Officer Commanding, Charlie Company, 1st Military Police Battalion.
- Warrant Officer Class One Christopher Barry McCulloch – For meritorious achievement as the Artificer Sergeant Major of the 3rd Combat Signal Regiment.
- Major Charmian Lynette McKean – For meritorious achievement in the management of Army's Military Employment Category Review Boards
- Lieutenant Colonel Stephen Michael Markham – For meritorious achievement as the Staff Officer Grade 2 leading the sustainment and development of critical information communications networks to meet the Australian Defence Force's joint data exchange needs.
- Warrant Officer Class One Ashley Milne – For meritorious achievement as the Operations Warrant Officer - Land at the Defence Network Operations Centre, Chief Information Officer Group.
- Major Lionel Edward Orreal – For meritorious devotion to duty as the Chaplain of the 6th Battalion, the Royal Australian Regiment, Regional Support Chaplain, Headquarters Forces Command and the Chaplain of the 8th/9th Battalion, the Royal Australian Regiment.
- Sergeant P – For meritorious devotion to duty as a Warrant Officer Static Line, Australian Defence Force Parachute School.
- Major S – For meritorious devotion to duty as the lead Australian Defence Force Liaison Officer to New South Wales during Operation COVID-19 ASSIST.
- Sergeant T – For meritorious devotion to duty in the field of Special Operations Electronic Warfare integration.
- Corporal Marcee Kiwa Thompson – For meritorious achievement as a Patrol Commander in the 2nd Squadron, Pilbara Regiment.

Air Force

- Squadron Leader Emily Grace Carrie – For meritorious devotion to duty in airworthiness certification for the Australian Defence Force.
- Warrant Officer Kane Shannon Evans – For meritorious achievement in airborne intelligence, surveillance, reconnaissance, electronic warfare capability development for the Australian Defence Force.
- Warrant Officer Michael Gaugg – For meritorious achievement in Non Destructive Testing in the Royal Australian Air Force.
- Wing Commander Trent Donald Harris – For meritorious achievement in cultural reform, infrastructure development, and integrated Base security at Royal Australian Air Force Base Richmond.
- Squadron Leader Christopher Michael Loadsman – For meritorious devotion to duty in the provision of deployed air traffic control services during Operation BUSHFIRE ASSIST 2019–2020.
- Wing Commander Michelle Leigh McPhail – For meritorious achievement in the field of language capability reform through capability mapping, skills maintenance re-design and innovations to language capability governance from January 2019 until December 2021.
- Squadron Leader David John Reid – For meritorious achievement in command and control systems support for P-8A Poseidon maritime patrol and response aircraft operations at Number 92 Wing, Royal Australian Air Force.
- Wing Commander Todd Kenneth Yurkowski – For meritorious achievement in aviation safety and maintenance interoperability in the Royal Australian Air Force.
