= Peter K. Smith =

British psychologist (born 1943)

- Born: 23 September 1943 (age 83)

Academic background
- Education: University of Oxford; University of Sheffield
- Thesis: Social and play behaviour of preschool children (1971)

Academic work
- Discipline: Developmental Psychology
- Institutions: Goldsmiths, University of London

Peter K Smith (born 23 September 1943) is a British developmental psychologist with a particular interest in children's social development.

== Career ==
Smith received his BSc at the University of Oxford and his Ph.D. from the University of Sheffield. Following his doctorate he continued at the University of Sheffield, obtaining a Personal Chair in 1991, before moving to Goldsmiths, University of London in 1995. There, he was Head of the Unit for School and Family Studies in the Department of Psychology from 1998 to 2011. He retired as Emeritus Professor of Psychology in 2011.

== Academic work ==
Smith has authored, co-authored or co-edited 28 books, and authored or co-authored 198 journal articles and 124 book chapters.

His general works in children’s development include the book Adolescence: A Very Short Introduction (Oxford University Press, 2016) [2] and successive editions of the textbook (with Helen Cowie and Mark Blades) Understanding Children’s Development (Blackwells, 1988, 1991, 1998, 2002, 2011, 2015). He co-edited collection (with Craig Hart) the Wiley-Blackwell Handbook of Childhood Social Development (Wiley-Blackwell, 2010). In 2015 he was awarded the William Thierry Preyer award for Excellence in Research on Human Development, by the European Society for Developmental Psychology.

He is known for his work on children’s play, and works include the edited collection (with Tony Pellegrini) The nature of play: Great apes and humans (Guilford, 2005), and the book Children and Play (Blackwell, 2010)

His most extensive research has been on bullying and violence in schools, where he has led a number of research projects. He was the chair of the European Cooperation in Science and Technology Cyberbullying Action (COST ACTION IS0801) from 2008 to 2012, and was PI of a project Bullying, Cyberbullying, and Pupil Safety and Wellbeing, financed by the Indian-European Research Networking in the Social sciences initiative (2012-2015). He is currently co-PI of a project Comparative study of cyberbullying in Qatar and the UK: risk factors, impact on health and solutions, financed by the Qatar National Research Fund (2013-2016). Publications include the edited collections (with Debra Pepler and Ken Rigby) Bullying in Schools: How Successful can Interventions be? (Cambridge University Press, 2004); (with Qing Li and Donna Cross) Cyberbullying in the Global Playground: Research from International Perspectives (Wiley-Blackwell, 2012); (with Georges Steffgen) Cyberbullying through the new media: Findings from an international network (Psychology Press, 2013) and (with Keumjoo Kwak and Yuichi Toda) School bullying in different cultures: Eastern and western perspectives (Cambridge University Press, 2016). He is author of Understanding school bullying: Its nature and prevention strategies (Sage, 2014).

== Awards ==
Smith is a Fellow of the British Psychological Society, the Association of Psychological Sciences, and the Academy of Social Sciences.
