= Ben LaHood =

New Zealand-born ophthalmologist

- Born: Benjamin Richard LaHood; 1983 (age 42–43); Dunedin, New Zealand
- Citizenship: New Zealand; Australia
- Education: University of Otago; University of Sydney; University of Adelaide
- Occupation: Ophthalmologist
- Years active: 2007–present
- Known for: Research on posterior corneal astigmatism; Refractive and cataract surgery
- Medical career
- Field: Ophthalmology
- Institutions: The Queen Elizabeth Hospital; Adelaide Eye and Laser Centre; University of Adelaide
- Notable works: Ophthalmology Against The Rule
- Website: drbenlahoodeyesurgeon.com

Benjamin Richard LaHood is a New Zealand-born ophthalmologist and cataract and refractive surgeon based in Adelaide, South Australia. He was a consultant ophthalmologist at The Queen Elizabeth Hospital and a senior clinical lecturer at the University of Adelaide; and is currently a surgeon at the Adelaide Eye and Laser Centre, and Parkview Day Surgery. He was included in The Ophthalmologist magazine's Power List of 100 ophthalmologists in 2023 and 2024.

== Early life and education ==
LaHood was born and raised in Dunedin, New Zealand. He attended Bayfield High School, where he was named dux and received the Prime Minister's Class Act award for academic achievement in 2001.

LaHood was the highest-ranked entrant to the University of Otago Medical School and graduated with an MB ChB with distinction in 2007. During medical school, he received several academic prizes, including the John Parr Prize in Ophthalmology. In 2011, he completed a postgraduate diploma in ophthalmic basic sciences with distinction, jointly awarded by the University of Otago and the University of Sydney. He received the Francis A. Billson Award for Ophthalmic Physiology, the Adam Locket Award for Ophthalmic Anatomy, and the Anthony Molteno Award for Ophthalmic Optics.

From 2018 to 2020, LaHood completed a PhD in ophthalmology and vision science at the University of Adelaide. His research on posterior corneal astigmatism was supervised by Michael Goggin and Robert Casson.

== Career ==
After graduating in medicine, LaHood briefly left clinical practice. Gordon Sanderson of the University of Otago's ophthalmology department later encouraged him to observe eye surgery at a regional hospital, which led him to pursue ophthalmology.

After completing his ophthalmology training, LaHood undertook a fellowship in cataract and refractive surgery at The Queen Elizabeth Hospital and Ashford Advanced Eye Care Centre in Adelaide. Under Michael Goggin, he trained in astigmatism management, intraocular lens implantation, and laser vision correction.

LaHood subsequently returned to New Zealand and practised as an ophthalmic surgeon in Auckland, specialising in cataract and refractive surgery, ocular surface disease, and keratoconus. He relocated to Adelaide in 2020 and took up consultant positions in South Australia.

LaHood works at the Adelaide Eye and Laser Centre and operates at ParkView Day Surgery in Eastwood and The Queen Elizabeth Hospital. He is a senior clinical lecturer at the University of Adelaide and a fellow of the Royal Australian and New Zealand College of Ophthalmologists. He is also a member of the Australasian, European, and American societies of cataract and refractive surgeons.

Since 2019, LaHood has co-hosted the ophthalmology podcast Ophthalmology Against The Rule with ophthalmologist Nick Andrew. The podcast covers topics including cataract surgery, intraocular lens design, glaucoma management, and astigmatism. LaHood also hosts The Second Look, an interview podcast about eye care, and is a rotating host of Rayner's Peer2Peer: The Podcast.

In 2025, LaHood launched Eyelid Defence, an SPF moisturiser formulated for the eyelids and surrounding skin. He developed the product after observing cases of eyelid skin cancer in his surgical practice in New Zealand and Australia.

== Research ==
LaHood's research and teaching focus on astigmatism management in cataract and refractive surgery, including posterior corneal astigmatism, toric intraocular lens implantation, and surgically induced astigmatism. He serves on the editorial board of Cataract and Refractive Surgery Today and has served as a guest medical editor on astigmatism management in cataract surgery. He has also worked as a consultant for Alcon and Carl Zeiss.

== Awards and recognition ==
LaHood was included in The Ophthalmologist magazine's Power List of 100 ophthalmologists in 2023 and 2024. In 2023, he was the only ophthalmologist from South Australia and one of two Australians selected. He was included again in 2024 alongside Australian and New Zealand ophthalmologists Keith Martin, Helen Danesh-Meyer, Robyn Guymer, and Stephanie Watson.
