= Cristina Pieta Cifuentes =

Australian economist

Cristina Cifuentes AM
- Born: Spain
- Education: University of Technology, Sydney, University of Sydney
- Occupations: Economist, director
- Employer: Harrison Riedel Foundation

Christina Cifuentes AM is an Australian expert in energy policy and markets, and was a board member of the Australian Energy Regulator, Australia's national energy market regulator, who was awarded an Order of Australia in the 2022 Queens Birthday Honours list, for her significant service to economic and energy sector regulation, and to consumer protection.

== Early life and career ==
Cifuentes was born in Spain, and spent her childhood and grew up within Sydney. She obtained a first class honours degree in law (Bachelor of Laws at the University of Technology, Sydney), then followed by a Bachelor of Economics at the University of Sydney. She was head of legal policy at ASIC from 1990 – 1993 and has worked in both the private and public sectors, with experience at NSW Treasury, the Reserve Bank of Australia, as well as the Australian Securities Commission.

Cifuentes started a role as a Commissioner of the ACCC (Australian Competition and Consumer commission) in 2013, for five years, and then her term was reappointed, in 2018. She was also a board member of the Australian Energy Regulator, and provided advice on policy on energy regulation,

Cifuentes was director of the Hunter Water Corporation, NSW T Corp as well as First State Super Trustee Corporation. She was also the chair of the ACCC's committee for Communications and Infrastructure. She was employed at the Harrison Riedel Foundation, and is a member of the Finance Committee of the St Patrick's Church within the Rocks area of Sydney CBD. She has given international talks on energy policy and markets.

== Gender Equity ==
Cifuentes's work supporting and advocating for women and people from cultural and linguistically diverse communities was recognised while she was at the ACCC. She was involved in mentoring, within the Women in Energy international program.

Cifuentes has been a mentor for the Women in Law Enforcement Strategies, Law student program, University of Notre Dame, as well as the NSW Premier's Council for Women.

She commented on the need for women to have leadership roles on boards:

“Women are, and should be, considered equally capable as men in terms of being developed as future leaders. This has to happen from their very first job, not 15 to 20 years into their work-life, when companies start to cast around looking for potential female directors. So whilst the commitment to getting more women on boards may be there, organisations need to do a lot more in terms of developing the talent and capabilities of their female staff from the very beginning. They also need to provide opportunities for them to continue to work meaningfully if they decide to take up family obligations.”

== Awards ==
- 2022 – Queens Birthday Honour List – AM
- 2016 – UTS Alumni award for Excellence – law.
