= Anne Green (scientist) =

Australian physicist and astronomer

Anne Josephine Green AC is an Australian physicist and astronomer. She is a professor emeritus at the University of Sydney and was previously head of the university's School of Physics. She was also director of the Molonglo Observatory Synthesis Telescope for a decade.

== Early life ==
Green was awarded a Doctorate of Philosophy (Ph.D.) by the University of Sydney in 1973, writing a thesis titled "Spiral structure of the galaxy from a radio continuum survey" under the supervision of Bernard Mills. She was the first female Ph.D. student to be enrolled in the university's school of physics. She subsequently undertook further research at the Max Planck Institute for Radio Astronomy in Germany.

== Career ==
Green rejoined the University of Sydney's School of Physics in 1991 and "went on to build a prolific career focussed on the ecology and structure of the Milky Way Galaxy". She served as director of the Molonglo Observatory Synthesis Telescope for over a decade and was appointed as the school's first female head in 2007. She retired in 2017.

Green was president of the Astronomical Society of Australia from 2003 to 2005 and served as chair of Astronomy Australia Limited. She was also an inaugural co-chair of the Women in Astronomy Working Group of the International Astronomical Union.

== Honours ==
A portrait of Green by Yvette Coppersmith was installed in the University of Sydney's Physics Foundation Room in 2019, hanging alongside portraits of Harry Messel and Adolph Basser. She was appointed Companion of the Order of Australia (AC) in the 2022 Queen's Birthday Honours, for "eminent service to science, particularly physics and astrophysics, as an educator and researcher, as a mentor to colleagues and students, and a role model to women".

The Anne Green prize was established by the Astronomical Society of Australia upon Green's retirement, to honour her contribution to astronomy. The prize is awarded annually to an Australian Astronomer for mid-career achievement.
