= Jennie Brand-Miller =

Australian scientist (born 1952)

Jennie Brand-Miller AO FAA
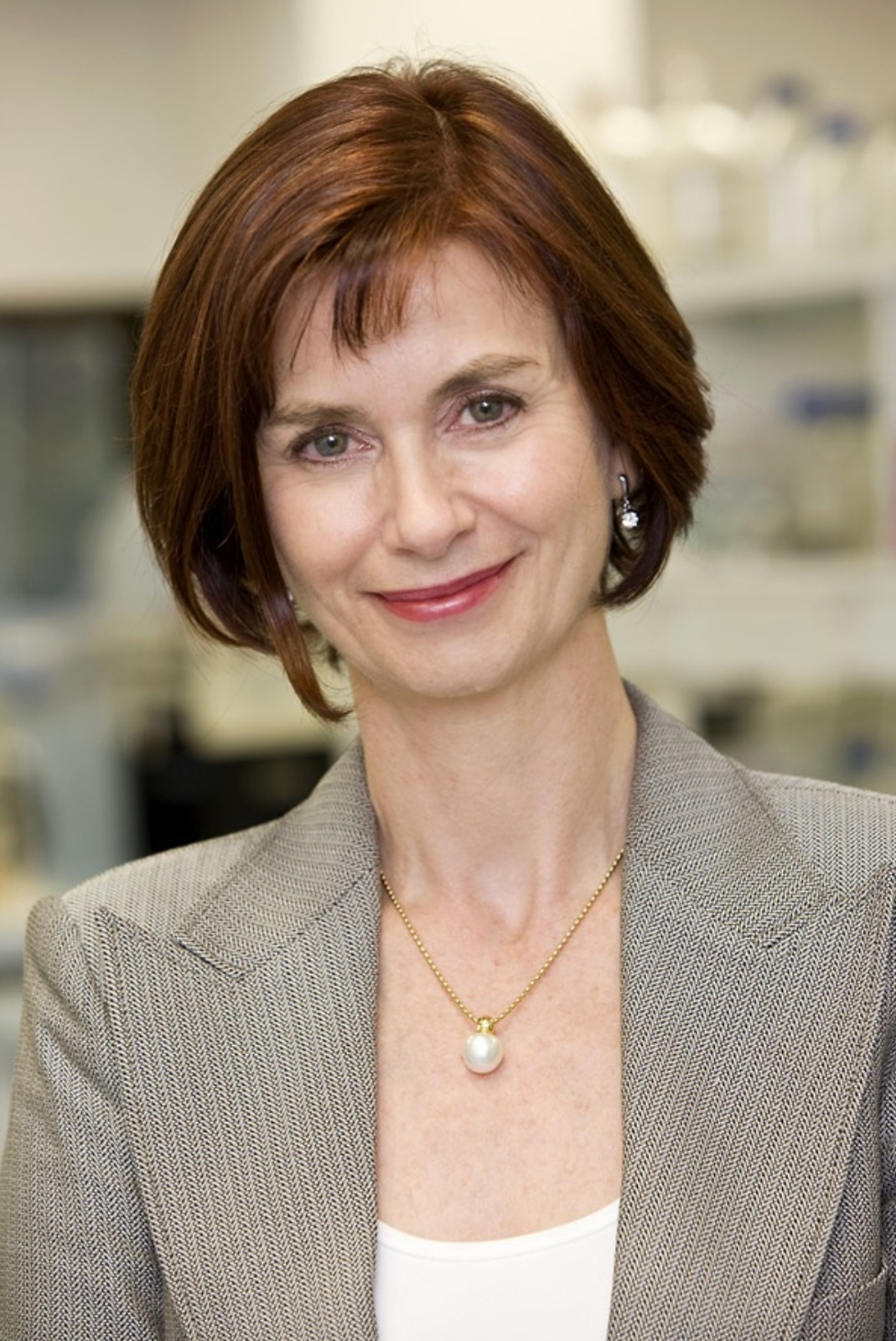
- Born: 1952 (age 73–74)
- Spouse: Dr John James Miller (1)
- Awards: Fellow of the Australian Academy of Science (2018); Officer of the Order of Australia (2022)
- Scientific career
- Fields: Nutrition
- Workplaces: University of Sydney (1978–present)
- Website: sydney.edu.au/science/about/our-people/academic-staff/jennie-brandmiller.html

Janette Cecile Brand-Miller AO FAA (born 1952), also known as Jennie Brand-Miller, Janette Cecile Brand, and GI Jennie, is an Australian academic, now Emeritus Professor in human nutrition in the School of Life and Environmental Sciences and Charles Perkins Centre at the University of Sydney.She is best known for her research and publications on the glycemic index, a term originated by David J. Jenkins of the University of Toronto, and its role in human health.

== Early life and education ==
Brand-Miller was born in 1952. She studied food science and technology before completing a doctorate (PhD) in nutrition at the University of New South Wales. Her early published research included a 1977 trial, reported in the Medical Journal of Australia, of lactose-hydrolysed milk in Aboriginal Australian children, examining lactose intolerance.

== Research ==
Brand-Miller's research focused on carbohydrates and the glycaemic index (GI) of foods, a ranking of carbohydrate-containing foods according to their effect on blood-glucose levels. Her research contributed to the development and application of standardised methods for measuring the glycaemic index of foods, as well as glycaemic index databases and an international glycaemic index testing service used in nutrition research and food regulation. Her work also examined the role of the glycaemic index in pregnancy, the composition of traditional Aboriginal foods, and human variation in the salivary amylase gene AMY1. She also co-founded a food-labelling program that displays a certified low-GI symbol on qualifying products.

== Books ==
Brand-Miller is a co-author, with dietitian Kaye Foster-Powell and others, of the ''New Glucose Revolution'' series of consumer books on low-GI eating, which helped popularise the concept of the glycemic index. The books draw on research carried out in her University of Sydney laboratory and cover topics including diabetes management, weight loss, and cooking.

== Personal life ==
Brand-Miller experienced progressive hearing loss beginning in her teens, wore hearing aids from her twenties, and became profoundly deaf in one ear.She received a cochlear implant and later became a bilateral cochlear-implant recipient, and has been an advocate for people with hearing impairment and disability.

== Awards and recognition ==
- 2003: Received a Clunies Ross Medal for Science and Technology
- 2004: Received the Australian Institute of Food Science and Technology Award of Merit
- 2006: Named a finalist in the Australian of the Year (New South Wales) awards.
- 2009: Received the Sir Kempson Maddox Award for her significant contribution to the diabetes movement and towards helping to improve the lives of people living with diabetes
- 2011: Appointed as a Member of the Order of Australia (AM), for her research into human nutrition and as a supporter of people with a hearing impairment.
- 2018: Elected Fellow of the Australian Academy of Science (FAA).
- 2022: Upgraded to Officer of the Order of Australia in the 2022 Queen's Birthday Honours for "distinguished service to science, notably in the field of human nutrition, and as an advocate for people with disability".

== Selected Publication ==
- Brand-Miller, Jennie; Hardy, Karen; Raubenheimer, David; Copeland, Les (6 August 2026). "A central role for dietary sugars in human evolution". Science. 393 (6811): 574–581. doi:10.1126/science.aed8437.
- Atkinson FS, Brand-Miller JC, Foster-Powell K, Buyken AE, Goletzke J (2021). "International tables of glycemic index and glycemic load values 2021: a systematic review". ''The American Journal of Clinical Nutrition''. 114 (5): 1625–1632.
- Moses RG, Luebcke M, Davis WS, Coleman KJ, Tapsell LC, Petocz P, Brand-Miller JC (2006). "Effect of a low-glycemic-index diet during pregnancy on obstetric outcomes". ''The American Journal of Clinical Nutrition''. 84 (4): 807–812.
- Cordain L, Eaton SB, Sebastian A, Mann N, Lindeberg S, Watkins BA, O'Keefe JH, Brand-Miller J (2005). "Origins and evolution of the Western diet: health implications for the 21st century". ''The American Journal of Clinical Nutrition''. 81 (2): 341–354.
- Brand-Miller JC, Holt SHA, Pawlak DB, McMillan J (2002). "Glycemic index and obesity". ''The American Journal of Clinical Nutrition''. 76 (1): 281S–285S.
- Brand-Miller J, James K, Maggiore P (1993). ''Tables of Composition of Australian Aboriginal Foods''. Canberra: Aboriginal Studies Press.
- Brand JC, Colagiuri S, Crossman S, Allen A, Roberts DCK, Truswell AS (1991). "Low-glycemic index foods improve long-term glycemic control in NIDDM". ''Diabetes Care''. 14 (2): 95–101.
- Brand JC, Nicholson P, Thorburn A, Truswell AS (1985). "Food processing and the glycemic index". ''The American Journal of Clinical Nutrition''. 42 (6): 1192–1196.
