= Catharyn Johanna Stern =

Australian gynaecologist

Catharyn Johanna Stern AO
- Education: University of Melbourne
- Occupation: Gynaecologist
- Employer: Waverley Private Hospital
- Known for: Gynaecology & infertility

Catharyn Johanna Stern AO is a clinical associate professor, and gynaecologist at Waverley Private Hospital in Melbourne, Victoria. She was appointed an Officer of the Order of Australia for distinguished service to gynaecology, reproductive medicine and fertility research. Stern has been a member of the Australian Medical Association (AMA) member for 23 years. Her award was for her services to gynaecology, to reproductive medicine and fertility research, and to the community.

== Career ==
Stern was awarded a Bachelor of Medicine and Bachelor of Surgery at the University of Melbourne in 1987. She is a specialist in gynaecology and obstetrics, and specialises in reproductive fertility. She initially trained at The Women's Hospital, as well at The Mercy hospital, and subsequently obtained experience and training while in the United Kingdom for two years.

Stern next spent three years working and obtaining experience in reproductive endocrinology and infertility. She is the head of the Fertility Preservation Service within the Melbourne IVF and The Women's Hospital. She works at the Melbourne IVF clinical research program, as well as working in clinical practice. Stern is leading a national trial within Australia, with the goal of protecting the fertility of women who are undergoing treatment with chemotherapy, and cancer patients.

Stern started the Australian and New Zealand group in fertility preservation, "Special Interest Group". The group is made up of national and international experts who specialise in the preservation of fertility, and was started in 2009. Stern was also appointed to be the chair of the Clinical Oncological Society of Australia, which is a fertility guidance group. The group has been involved in writing guidelines and practices that provide recommendations, based on evidence, as well as 'good practice' which then helps enable medical practitioners and health professionals to have conversations and discussions about fertility, to efficiently and effectively make informed decisions around the treatment of fertility with patients and their families.

Stern has also worked on an IVF success comparator, which is an online website that allows women and their families to compare the success rates of different IVF clinics within Australia. Stern has also published on the difficulties of young rural women in receiving treatment for their fertility.

== Select publications ==
Stern has published 49 peer-reviewed publications, as at July 2022, with an H-index of 20, and over 1700 citations.

Select publications include:

- Catharyn Stern, Lawrence Chamley, Helen Norris, Lyndon Hale, H.W. Gordon Baker,(2003) A randomized, double-blind, placebo-controlled trial of heparin and aspirin for women with in vitro fertilization implantation failure and antiphospholipid or antinuclear antibodies, Fertility and Sterility, Volume 80, Issue 2, 2003, pages 376–383, doi.org/10.1016/S0015-0282(03)00610-1
- Jennifer Levine, Andrea Canada, and Catharyn J. Stern. (2010) Journal of Clinical Oncology 2010 28:32, 4831-4841
- Meagan Allen, Lyndon Hale, Daniel Lantsberg, Violet Kieu, John Stevens, Catharyn Stern, David K Gardner, Yossi Mizrachi (2022) Post-warming embryo morphology is associated with live birth: a cohort study of single vitrified-warmed blastocyst transfer cycles. Journal of Assisted reproduction and genetics. doi: 10.1007/s10815-021-02390-z

== Awards, honours and fellowships ==
2022 – Officer of the Order of Australia, Queen's Birthday Honours

2004 - FRANZCOG - Fellow of the Royal Australian and New Zealand College of Obstetricians and Gynaecologists
