= Peter Saunders (Australian academic) =

Australian social researcher (born 1948)

Peter Gordon Saunders AO FASSA (born 1948) is an Australian social researcher. He is a professor and Director of the Social Policy Research Centre at the University of New South Wales. He was elected Fellow of the Academy of the Social Sciences in Australia in 1995 and in the 2022 Queen's Birthday Honours he was appointed an Officer of the Order of Australia.

== Bibliography ==
- Saunders, Peter; Walter, James (2005). Ideas and Influence: Social Science and Public Policy in Australia. Sydney: UNSW Press. ISBN 978-0-86840-914-6.
