= Cheryl Dissanayake =

Autism researcher

Professor Cheryl Dissanayake AM, FASSA is Professor Emerita at La Trobe University. She was the inaugural Olga Tennison Endowed Chair in Autism Research and was the founding Director of the Olga Tennison Autism Research Centre based at La Trobe University, Australia. She is a developmental psychologist and behavioural scientist in the field of autism research.

== Early life ==
Dissanayake attended St Bridget's Convent in Colombo from 1966 to 1973, and Bentleigh High School (now Bentleigh Secondary College) in Melbourne from 1974 to 1977. She commenced at Monash University in 1978, taking out an Honours degree in Psychology (1983) and a PhD (1992). Her postdoctoral research was undertaken in the Sigman lab at UCLA in the US from 1993 to 1995 inclusive.

== Research and career ==
Dissanayake's early research focused on the development of attachment in Autistic children which challenged previously held notions that they were not attached to their primary caregivers. She joined the Department of Psychological Science at La Trobe University in 1996 where she established her autism research lab. Her comprehensive studies on the behavioural, cognitive and physical phenotypes of children with diagnoses of 'Autistic Disorder' and 'Asperger's Disorder' (as per DSM 4) contributed a significant body of research regarding the lack of distinction between these conditions which contributed to the single diagnostic label of Autism Spectrum Disorders adopted in DSM 5.

Her research on the early autism phenotype led to the first Australian community-based study to prospectively identify autism in infancy via the Maternal and Child Health Service (MCH). The success of this study and a replication study indicated that Autistic children can be reliably identified and diagnosed by 2-years of age. In 2010, Dissanayake helped establish the Victorian Autism Specific Early learning and Care Centre, adopting the Early Start Denver Model which she had introduced to Australia in 2009. Her related studies on early learning and early therapy outcomes in Autistic pre-schoolers indicated the impact of accessing evidence-based therapy early in life, serving to improve developmental outcomes and facilitate social inclusion into the school years. In addition to detailed behavioural observation studies, she investigated the physiological correlates of behaviour including the cardiac and attentional responses of Autistic children to social and emotional stimuli and undertaking studies of biological markers. Her research on growth in infants later diagnosed as Autistic provided the first evidence that autism is often characterized by generalised growth dysregulation, extending this work to show that growth dysregulation is also common in older Autistic children and adolescents. Dissanayake has investigated autism manifestations in boys with Fragile X Syndrome (FXS) and compared the behavioural and cognitive profiles in Autistic boys with idiopathic autism as such comparisons cast light on the biological mechanisms involved in the origins of autism. More recently, Dissanayake has engaged in studies of Autistic adolescents and adults focused on employment and mental health.

== Awards ==
In 2018, Dissanayake was elected Fellow of the International Society of Autism Research in its inaugural round, and served as vice-president between 2019–2021. In 2021, she was awarded a Lifetime Membership by the Australasian Society for Autism Research, which she helped co-found in 2011, and where she served as vice president for 10 years. Dissanayake has been named the field leader in developmental disabilities by The Australian Research Magazine for 6 consecutive years (2018–2023) and a field leader in Child and Adolescent Psychology for 5 consecutive years (2018–2022). In the 2022 Queen's Birthday Honours, she was awarded a Member of the Order of Australia (AM) for significant service to medical research, to tertiary education, and to professional societies and was elected as a Fellow of the Academy of the Social Sciences in Australia in the same year.
