= Deidre Anderson =

Australian academic

Deidre Karen Anderson AM (born 22 May 1957) is an Australian academic administrator, sports executive, sports transitions specialist and coach. Until May 2017 she was the Deputy Vice-Chancellor (Students and Registrar) at Macquarie University. She is co-founder and Director of the Performance and Transition Institute (PTI) and consults regularly on performance and wellbeing of athletes around the world.

== Sports ==
Anderson is known for advising elite athletes, including Cathy Freeman and swimmer Ian Thorpe on his decisions to take time out in 2006 and his subsequent brief comeback in 2011. She received a Services to Sport award in 2008 from Australian University Sports. She has worked with the Scottish Institute of Sport, Australian Institute of Sport and UK Sport. She has been a Director of Ausrapid. President of the Australian Womensport and Recreation Association Appointed independent Director to the Rugby League Players Association in 2016 and has been the chair since 2018. In 2024 she was elected as the Chair of the Women's Football Council for Football Australia. Deidre is currently a subject matter expert for FIFA Women's Football Health and AIS athlete transition.

== University career ==
Anderson earned her Ph.D.in 2017 graduating from Macquarie University in Sydney. She also obtained a BA (1989) and Master's degree (1999) from the Victoria University of Technology, who awarded her the Distinguished Alumni Award in 2014. She joined Macquarie University as chief executive of sport and recreation in 2003. In 2007 she became CEO of Macquarie's student services, and in August 2011 became a Deputy Vice-Chancellor. She was involved in legal action against the Macquarie University Postgraduate Representatives Association.

Anderson was appointed a Member of the Order of Australia (AM) in the 2022 Queen's Birthday Honours for her contribution to sport and tertiary education.
