= Peter Choong =

Australian orthopaedic surgeon and academic

Peter Choong AO
- Born: Peter Fook Meng Choong; Kuala Lumpur, Malaysia
- Education: University of Melbourne (MBBS, MD)
- Occupations: Orthopaedic surgeon and academic

Peter Fook Meng Choong AO is an Australian orthopaedic surgeon and academic whose clinical and research work concerns musculoskeletal tumours, joint replacement and biofabrication. The University of Melbourne lists him as an honorary enterprise professor in the Melbourne Medical School. He previously served as director of orthopaedics at St Vincent's Hospital, Melbourne from 1996 to 2020, held the Sir Hugh Devine Chair of Surgery, and was president of the Australian Orthopaedic Association in 2013–2014.

In 2014, Choong led the St Vincent's surgical team that implanted a custom 3D-printed titanium heel in a patient with cancer, an operation reported as a world first. He was appointed an Officer of the Order of Australia in 2022 for service to orthopaedic medicine, research, medical education and professional associations.

== Early life and education ==
Choong was born in Kuala Lumpur, Malaysia. He was eight years old during the May 13 riots in Kuala Lumpur in 1969. His family later emigrated to Australia and settled in Noble Park, and he attended Melbourne Grammar School.

Choong studied medicine at the University of Melbourne, graduating in 1984, and completed advanced surgical training at St Vincent's Hospital. After completing an MD, he undertook orthopaedic oncology fellowships at Lund University Hospital in Sweden and the Mayo Clinic in Rochester, Minnesota.

== Career ==
In 1996, Choong became director of orthopaedics at St Vincent's Hospital and established a sarcoma service at the Peter MacCallum Cancer Centre. He later chaired Peter MacCallum's Bone and Soft Tissue Sarcoma Service. He was program director of surgery and surgical services at St Vincent's from 1997 to 2002 and chief medical officer from 2005 to 2008. In 2009, the University of Melbourne and St Vincent's appointed him to the Sir Hugh Devine Chair of Surgery.

Choong served on committees and boards of the Australian Orthopaedic Association and was its president from 2013 to 2014. He also chaired the association's Federal Training Committee and the Royal Australasian College of Surgeons' Board of Orthopaedics. He concluded his tenure as director of orthopaedics at St Vincent's in 2020. That year he was appointed head of the Department of Surgery within the Melbourne Medical School. In August 2022, the university appointed him associate dean for innovation and enterprise in its Faculty of Medicine, Dentistry and Health Sciences. The university now lists him as an honorary enterprise professor.

== Research ==
=== Joint replacement and musculoskeletal oncology ===
Choong's research has covered musculoskeletal tumours, joint replacement and advanced limb reconstruction. At St Vincent's he founded the St Vincent's Melbourne Arthroplasty Outcomes Registry in 1998. The registry has been used to study how patient, prosthetic and treatment factors affect outcomes and implant survival. In 2016, he became principal investigator of the NHMRC-funded Centre for Research Excellence in Total Joint Replacement, known as OPUS, which examined patient safety, outcomes, efficiency and equitable access to joint replacement.

His joint-replacement research has included a prospective randomised trial comparing conventional and computer-assisted total knee arthroplasty, studies of infection risk following hip and knee replacement, and an international consensus project on outcome domains for joint-replacement trials.

In musculoskeletal oncology, he has co-authored reviews of the treatment and molecular biology of osteosarcoma. His clinical research has included a cohort study examining the effect of residual disease after unplanned excision of soft-tissue sarcoma. He edited the 2020 Springer reference work Sarcoma: A Practical Guide to Multidisciplinary Management and contributed chapters on biopsy, surgical margins and limb and pelvic sarcoma surgery.

=== Biofabrication and medical devices ===
Choong collaborated with materials scientist Gordon Wallace and other researchers on the BioPen, a handheld device designed to deposit cell-containing material at a cartilage wound site. The team published its proof-of-concept work in Biofabrication in 2016, followed by an animal study of handheld bioprinting for cartilage repair. The project was also covered by ABC News during preclinical testing.

Choong was involved in establishing BioFab3D, an advanced biofabrication centre opened at St Vincent's in 2016 to bring clinicians together with researchers in biology, materials science, biomedical engineering and robotics. The BioPen team was selected as a finalist in the Australian Museum Eureka Prizes in both 2017 and 2018.

The 2014 titanium heel implant involved Choong's surgical team, the Commonwealth Scientific and Industrial Research Organisation and medical-device company Anatomics. A model derived from the patient's other heel was used to produce the implant after cancer affected the calcaneus. Choong and Jungo Imanishi subsequently published a case report describing the implant and the patient's early recovery.

In 2017, Choong joined the five-year Just in Time Implants collaboration between RMIT University, the University of Technology Sydney, St Vincent's Hospital, Stryker and the Innovative Manufacturing Cooperative Research Centre. The project investigated combining patient-specific additive manufacturing with robot-assisted bone-tumour surgery. In 2023, the group reported an animal study evaluating robotic tumour excision followed by placement of patient-specific implants.

In 2022, Choong became lead investigator of ARISTOCRAT, a Medical Research Future Fund project on cartilage regeneration and tissue-engineered treatments that received approximately A$7 million. In 2025, he led a further A$7 million MRFF project intended to expand the Australian Spine Registry into a national clinical quality registry for monitoring spinal implants and treatments.

== Honours ==
- In 2008, Choong received the John Mitchell Crouch Fellowship from the Royal Australasian College of Surgeons.
- The Mayo Clinic appointed him Ivins Visiting Professor in 2003 and Coventry Visiting Professor in 2014.
- He was elected a fellow of the Australian Academy of Health and Medical Sciences in 2015.
- The Australian Orthopaedic Association gave him its Award for Service to Orthopaedic Research in 2015.
- In 2019, the National Health and Medical Research Council awarded Choong its highest-ranked Practitioner Fellowship for research on the care of end-stage osteoarthritis.
- He was appointed an Officer of the Order of Australia in the 2022 Queen's Birthday Honours.
