= Donna Cross =

Donna Cross OAM FAHMS
- Born: Western Australia, Australia
- Education: Columbia University (EdD, 1992); Curtin University (Graduate Diploma in Health Science, 1987); Western Australian Institute of Technology (Bachelor of Education, 1983)
- Occupations: Academic and researcher in child and adolescent health
- Known for: Bullying and cyberbullying prevention; Friendly Schools programme
- Awards: Medal of the Order of Australia (2022); Western Australian Science Hall of Fame (2023)
- Scientific career
- Workplaces: University of Western Australia; Telethon Kids Institute; Edith Cowan University; Curtin University

Donna Cross OAM FAHMS is an Australian academic, researcher and child health advocate specialising in bullying and cyberbullying prevention among children and young people. She is Emeritus Professor at the University of Western Australia (UWA). She led the research and development of the Friendly Schools programme, a whole-school bullying prevention intervention that has been used in more than 3,000 Australian schools.

Cross was Education Director at the American Health Foundation in New York (1988–1992) and Director of the Western Australian Centre for Health Promotion Research at Curtin University (1993–2003). She was a professor at Edith Cowan University (2004–2014) and later at UWA (2014 until her retirement in 2022), where she headed a health promotion research programme at the Telethon Kids Institute (now The Kids Research Institute Australia). In March 2023, she was appointed the first Chief Behaviour Advisor to the New South Wales Government for an initial two-year term. She received the Medal of the Order of Australia in 2022.

== Education ==
Cross received a PhD from Columbia University, in New York, and a Bachelor of Education from the Western Australia Institute of Technology in 1983.

== Career ==
Cross began in education and moved into public health and health promotion research focused on the health and wellbeing of children and young people. She has worked with the American Health Foundation in New York. Her Friendly Schools research began at Curtin University of Technology in 1999, and was later based at Edith Cowan University (ECU). At ECU she was Professor of Child and Adolescent Health and founding director of the Child Health Promotion Research Centre.

In 2014 Cross moved to UWA as Winthrop Professor, based at the Telethon Institute for Child Health Research. She headed the institute’s Health Promotion and Education research program and led a large multidisciplinary team. From 2020 to 2022 she was the Western Australian node director of the ARC Centre of Excellence for Children and Families over the Life Course, a seven-year, A$32 million research centre. She retired in 2022.

In March 2023 the New South Wales Government announced Cross as its first Chief Behaviour Advisor. Education Minister Sarah Mitchell described the role as a “specialist advisor on student behaviour” and Cross as “a leader in the field of children’s mental health”. The government said she was chosen after a global search and would start on 27 March 2023 for an initial two years. Her work focused on student behaviour and wellbeing, particularly the prevention of and responses to bullying and cyberbullying.

Cross has also advised the Western Australian Minister for Education and the New South Wales and South Australian education departments. In 2020 she joined the Group of Eight’s expert task force on Australia’s COVID-19 recovery. She has been an expert adviser to UNESCO, the World Health Organization and the (Princess) Mary Foundation in Denmark.

== Research ==
Cross has been awarded more than A$74 million in funding to conduct 79 applied research projects investigating ways to improve children's and young people's health and wellbeing. Her research has resulted in more than 200 peer-reviewed papers, books and book chapters. She has supervised more than 40 PhD and master's students to completion.

=== Friendly Schools ===
Friendly Schools began in 1999, when Cross led a review of the evidence on reducing school bullying. The first trial ran from 2000 to 2002 with 1,968 students aged 8 to 9 in 29 schools. Students in the program schools were less likely to be bullied after 12 and 36 months, and more likely to tell someone about bullying after 12 months. Self-reported bullying of others did not differ between the groups. By 2021 the research team had tested the program in 18 studies, seven of them randomised controlled trials. The program is designed to align with the National Safe Schools Framework.

The resources were commercialized in 2005 and have been used in more than 3,000 Australian schools.

=== Cyberbullying ===
In 2011 the Australian Human Rights Commission worked with Cross's centre at Edith Cowan University (ECU) on a campaign to help young people act safely when they see cyberbullying. The same report said her research on covert bullying fed into the cyberbullying parts of the revised National Safe Schools Framework.

Cross's team also developed Cyber Friendly Schools, an online whole-school program designed with young people. In a randomised trial reported in 2016, 35 non-government secondary schools in Perth took part, with more than 3,000 students. Nineteen schools used the program and sixteen formed the comparison group. Students in the program schools showed significant declines in cyber-victimisation and cyber-perpetration at the first follow-up. The researchers found no other differences between the groups. Teachers delivered only about a third of the program. Her team also helped develop ImageUp, a free app that prompts young people to pause before sharing images online, and Beacon, a free cyber safety app to support parents and carers.

=== Public commentary ===
Cross is the patron of the Australian Psychologists and Counsellors in Schools (APACS) and an Ambassador for Children and Young People appointed by the Western Australian Commissioner for Children and Young People. She is also an ambassador for Ngala and The Fathering Project, organisations that support child wellbeing, parenting and family relationships.

Cross has argued that schools should teach students to use social media safely rather than only ban it. In 2011 she said that encouraging witnesses to support someone being targeted can stop bullying between peers faster than adult intervention alone. In 2016 she said that banning technology may unintentionally increase the extent to which some young people conceal their online behaviours, placing them at greater risk.

In 2023 Cross and Leanne Lester published Leading Improvement in School Community Wellbeing (ACER Press), a guide for school leaders on assessing and improving wellbeing in their schools.

== Selected publications ==
- Dooley, J. J.; Pyżalski, J.; Cross, D. (2009). “Cyberbullying versus face-to-face bullying: A theoretical and conceptual review”. Zeitschrift für Psychologie / Journal of Psychology. 217 (4): 182–188. doi:10.1027/0044-3409.217.4.182.
- Perren, S.; Dooley, J.; Shaw, T.; Cross, D. (2010). “Bullying in school and cyberspace: Associations with depressive symptoms in Swiss and Australian adolescents”. Child and Adolescent Psychiatry and Mental Health. 4: 28. doi:10.1186/1753-2000-4-28.
- Cross, D.; Monks, H.; Hall, M.; Shaw, T.; Pintabona, Y.; Erceg, E.; Hamilton, G.; Roberts, C.; Waters, S.; Lester, L. (2011). “Three-year results of the Friendly Schools whole-of-school intervention on children’s bullying behaviour”. British Educational Research Journal. 37 (1): 105–129. doi:10.1080/01411920903420024.
- Cross, D.; Epstein, M.; Hearn, L.; Slee, P.; Shaw, T.; Monks, H. (2011). “National Safe Schools Framework: Policy and practice to reduce bullying in Australian schools”. International Journal of Behavioural Development. 35 (5): 398–404. doi:10.1177/0165025411407456.
- Li, Q.; Cross, D.; Smith, P. K., eds. (2012). Cyberbullying in the Global Playground: Research from International Perspectives. Wiley-Blackwell. ISBN 978-1-4443-3376-3.
- Bauman, S.; Cross, D.; Walker, J., eds. (2012). Principles of Cyberbullying Research: Definitions, Measures, and Methodology. Routledge. ISBN 978-0-415-89749-5.
- Cross, D.; Lester, L.; Barnes, A. (2015). “A longitudinal study of the social and emotional predictors and consequences of cyber and traditional bullying victimisation”. International Journal of Public Health. 60 (2): 207–217. doi:10.1007/s00038-015-0655-1.
- Cross, D.; Barnes, A.; Papageorgiou, A.; Hadwen, K.; Hearn, L.; Lester, L. (2015). “A social-ecological framework for understanding and reducing cyberbullying behaviours”. Aggression and Violent Behaviour. 23: 109–117. doi:10.1016/j.avb.2015.05.016.
- Cross, D.; Shaw, T.; Hadwen, K.; Cardoso, P.; Slee, P.; et al. (2016). “Longitudinal impact of the Cyber Friendly Schools program on adolescents’ cyberbullying Behaviour”. Aggressive Behaviour. 42 (2): 166–180. doi:10.1002/ab.21609.
- Cross, D.; Shaw, T.; Epstein, M.; Pearce, N.; Barnes, A.; Burns, S.; Waters, S.; Lester, L.; Runions, K. (2018). “Impact of the Friendly Schools whole-school intervention on transition to secondary school and adolescent bullying Behaviour”. European Journal of Education. 53 (4): 495–513. doi:10.1111/ejed.12307.
- Cross, D.; Runions, K. C.; Shaw, T.; Wong, J. W. Y.; Campbell, M.; Pearce, N.; Burns, S.; Lester, L.; Barnes, A.; Resnicow, K. (2019). “Friendly Schools universal bullying prevention intervention: Effectiveness with secondary school students”. International Journal of Bullying Prevention. 1 (1): 45–57. doi:10.1007/s42380-018-0004-z.
- Cross, D.; Runions, K. C.; Pearce, N. (2021). “Friendly Schools’ bullying prevention research: Implications for school counsellors”. Journal of Psychologists and Counsellors in Schools. 31 (2): 146–158. doi:10.1017/jgc.2021.19.
- Cross, D.; Lester, L. (2023). Leading Improvement in School Community Wellbeing. ACER Press. ISBN 978-1-74286-537-9.

== Honours and awards ==
- 2023 – Inducted into the Western Australian Science Hall of Fame.
- 2022 – Medal of the Order of Australia, “for significant service to youth mental health and wellbeing”.
- 2022 – Inducted into the Western Australian Women’s Hall of Fame.
- 2022 – Leadership in Health Promotion Award.
- 2016 – Churchill Fellowship, for a project on young children’s development in online environments.
- 2015 – Fellow, Australian Academy of Health and Medical Sciences.
- 2012 – Western Australian winner, Australian of the Year Awards.
- 2012 – Future Justice Prize.
