= Stephanie Watson (ophthalmologist) =

Australian ophthalmic surgeon

Stephanie Louise Watson OAM FRANZCO is an ophthalmic surgeon. She was awarded a Medal of the Order of Australia in 2022.

== Education ==
Watson earned a Bachelor of Medicine / Bachelor of Surgery degree in at the University of Sydney, Australia in 1994.

Her scholarships at Kikuyu Eye clinic in Kenya and Oxford University with Newsom-Davis highlighted the impact that research had on medicine. This led her to choose a career as a clinician scientist working in the field of cornea and external disease.

She completed sub-specialty training in the UK at Moorfields Eye Hospital in London and Manchester Royal Eye Hospital.

== Career and achievements ==
Watson has appointments at the Save Sight Institute, University of Sydney, Sydney Surgical Centre, Sydney Children's Hospital, Prince of Wales Hospital and is the Head of the Corneal Unit at the Sydney Eye Hospital.

In 2021, she made the Power List of the Top 100 Women in Ophthalmology as one of the world’s top 100 female ophthalmologists.

== Select publications ==
Watson has published numerous articles and holds international patents.

Year	Article	Journal
2004	Comparison of deep lamellar keratoplasty and penetrating keratoplasty in patients with keratoconus	Ophthalmology
2014	A comparison of lamellar and penetrating keratoplasty outcomes: A registry study	Ophthalmology
2019	Keratoconus natural progression: a systematic review and meta-analysis of 11 529 eyes	Ophthalmology
2004	A randomized trial of topical cyclosporin 0.05% in topical steroid–resistant atopic keratoconjunctivitis	Ophthalmology
2009	A contact lens-based technique for expansion and transplantation of autologous epithelial progenitors for ocular surface reconstruction	Transplantation
2006	Patterns of rejection after deep lamellar keratoplasty	Ophthalmology
