= Cross City Tunnel =

Motorway tunnel in Sydney, New South Wales, Australia

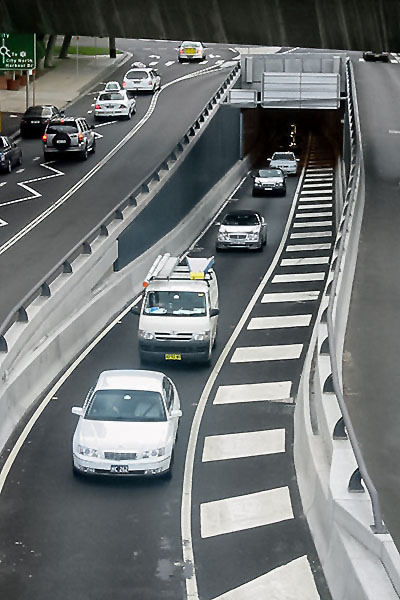
- Cross City Tunnel exit at Sir John Young Crescent, Woolloomooloo
- Interactive map of Cross City Tunnel

Overview
- Location: Sydney
- Coordinates: 33°52′23″S 151°12′13″E
- Start: Western Distributor; Darling Harbour
- End: New South Head Road; Bayswater Road; Rushcutters Bay

Operation
- Work began: January 2003
- Opened: August 2005
- Owner: Transport for NSW
- Operator: Transurban
- Toll: See Tolls section below

Technical
- Length: 2.2 km (1.4 mi)
- No. of lanes: 4
- Operating speed: 80 km/h (variable)
- Tunnel clearance: 4.4 m (14 ft)

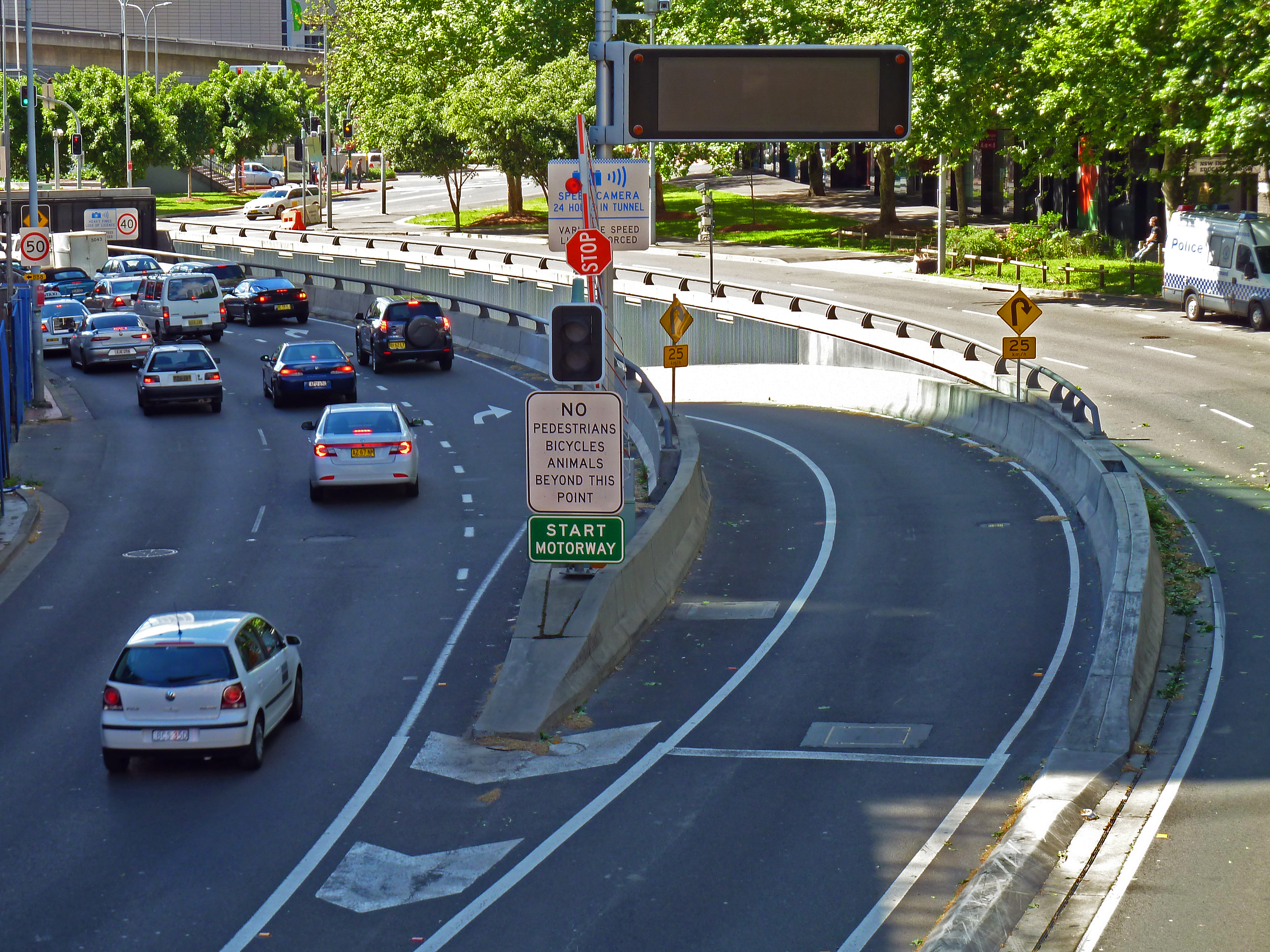
Cross City Tunnel entrance, Harbour Street, Sydney

The Cross City Tunnel is a 2.2-kilometre-long (1.4 mi) twin-road tunnel tollway located in Sydney, New South Wales, Australia. The tunnel links Darling Harbour on the western fringe of the central business district to Rushcutters Bay in the Eastern Suburbs. Each of the twin tunnels has a different alignment, with the westbound tunnel running underneath William and Park streets and the eastbound tunnel running underneath Bathurst Street.

The tunnel is owned by the Government of New South Wales and is operated by Transurban under a toll concession until 2035.

In early 2002, a year before construction began, transport planner Michelle Zeibots was quoted in local newspapers saying the tunnel would not reach its traffic targets.

== Design ==
The tunnel comprises two road tunnels – one eastbound and one westbound – each with two traffic lanes, in addition to a third small ventilation tunnel. The Cross City Tunnel also links with the Eastern Distributor, enabling vehicles travelling from the West to travel to the Airport and Southern Suburbs. From the Eastern Distributor, northbound motorists can connect to the Cross City Tunnel Westbound, avoiding the CBD once again.

The tunnel was Sydney's first completely electronic tollway requiring the driver to have an electronic tolling tag installed in their car or register for an electronic pass (for casual or less frequent users).

== History ==
Sydney's Cross City Tunnel was predicted to fail before construction even began. In February 2002, a year before tunnelling commenced and four years before it ultimately fell into receivership due to low traffic volumes, Sydney traffic planner Michelle Zeibots told local media that the tunnel was incapable of carrying the volume of cars that the Transport Minister, Carl Scully had predicted. She said it was "physically impossible" for the tunnel to carry the predicted 95,000 cars each day. While the NRMA was enthusiastic about building the new motorway, Dr Zeibots was scathing. "It's not a serious transport project," she said at the time. "The inputs and outputs just don't add up."

Despite the warnings of a traffic shortfall, in 2002, the government of Bob Carr awarded Cross City Motorways the contract to build, own and operate an east–west tunnel underneath the Sydney CBD.

The passing of the Roads Act of 1993 updated road classifications and the way they could be declared within New South Wales. Under this act, the Roads & Traffic Authority declared the Cross City Tunnel as Tollway 6010, from its interchange with Western Distributor in Darling Harbour to Rushcutters Bay, on 16 December 2002, nearly three years before it had officially opened; the tollway still retains this declaration today.

Construction work for the Cross City Tunnel commenced in January 2003, and the tunnel was originally scheduled to open in October 2005. In April 2005 the NSW government announced that the tunnel would open four months early on 12 June 2005. The opening day was subsequently postponed due to detailed commissioning works, with the official opening going ahead on 28 August 2005. The tunnel was opened by the Premier of New South Wales, Morris Iemma, using the same pair of scissors used to open the Sydney Harbour Bridge in 1932, the Sydney Harbour Tunnel in 1992 and the Anzac Bridge in 1995. Prior to the vehicular opening there was a charity walk-through, as is customary for new roadways in Sydney, which attracted a large number of public visitors. The first traffic passed through the tunnel late on 28 August.

Later a three-week toll-free period was announced by the operators. At the same time, the operators announced a freeze on toll increases for twelve months and the fee for casual (non-electronic tag) users was waived.

In February 2006, media speculation of a "buy-out" by the New South Wales government began. The rumoured price would exceed AUD$1 billion while the tunnel only cost AUD$680 million to build. The government stated no discussions had taken place, and the Cross City Tunnel Consortium stated that they were not considering selling the tunnel and were "in for the long haul". At the time the average trips per day was approximately 30,000.

This was shortly followed by a report from the NSW Upper House committee headed by MP Fred Nile recommending that the toll be reduced, and surface road closures reversed. While the recommendations could not be enforced, the Cross City Tunnel Consortium did consult with the government before announcing a discount to the toll, as well as other changes on 3 March 2006. Specifically, the Consortium announced that the toll would be halved to $1.78 for three months, that some planned road closures would not be pursued, and that some existing road closures would be reversed. Two days prior to the end of the half-price toll period, the Premier of NSW, Morris Iemma, ended negotiations with the Cross City Tunnel Consortium without an agreement, announcing the immediate reversal of some road closures, contrary to the contract.

In April 2006, a Reclaim the Streets protest was held at the Cross City Tunnel. Attendees called for greater investment in public transport and cycle paths, with partygoers occupying the tarmac and enjoying performances by the ShittyRail Transit Cop dance troupe.

In November 2006, it was reported that the motorway was in financial difficulties, and that additional equity would be required from the tunnel's investors in order to avoid placing the tunnel in administration. At the same time, it was suggested that traffic volumes of between 60,000 and 90,000 per day were needed in order for the consortium to meet the tunnel interest payments. The NSW government responded to the reports by indicating that it would not buy out the tunnel, nor assist in its financing.

=== Financing and ownership ===
The A$680 million tunnel was originally financed by a combination of international equity and both locally and internationally sourced debt.

Equity of $220 million was provided by three international companies, Cheung Kong Infrastructure (50%), DB Capital Partners (30%) and Bilfinger Berger (20%). The remaining $580 million was financed through a syndicate of Australian and international banks led by Westpac and Deutsche Bank. It was built by a Baulderstone Hornibrook / Bilfinger Berger joint venture.

In December 2006, the tollway became insolvent due to low traffic volumes, accumulating debts of over A$500 million. On 27 December 2006, a syndicate of 16 Australian and International banks appointed the insolvency firm KordaMentha as receivers and managers for Cross City Motorway Limited after the project accrued debts exceeding A$560 million.

On 20 June 2007, ABN AMRO (94%) and Leighton Contractors (6%) were chosen as preferred purchasers of the Cross City Tunnel Group for $700 million.

On 13 September 2013, the new owners placed itself in voluntary administration, saying that it was unable to refinance its debt due to action by the New South Wales government to claim $64 million in stamp duty on the original sale. In June 2014, the tunnel was sold to Transurban.

== Usage ==
There has been some controversy over the expected and actual usage of the tunnel during its initial operation. The number of vehicles travelling through the tunnel has been debated in the media, along with alleged discrepancies between the actual number of trips and the anticipated number of trips in the tunnel's financial projections.

Tunnel operators indicated that they expected initial uptake of the tunnel to reach approximately 35,000 vehicles per day, increasing over its first year of operation to a projected 90,000 vehicles per day. Once documentation of the official projections was released, it was found that the operators projected daily traffic after six months at 85,352.

Approximately one month after opening it was reported in the media that only 20,000 vehicles a day were using the tunnel, although the government and toll operators maintained that the average number of daily trips since opening was approximately 25,000.

At the completion of the initial three-week toll-free period, the tunnel operators announced that the daily tunnel usage had increased to 53,000 during that time.

A few weeks after the toll had been reinstated, it was reported in the media that usage had dropped back to approximately 27,000, an improvement of 7,000 cars per day compared with usage prior to the toll free period.

Following the toll-free period, the tunnel operator indicated that it would likely be two to three years before the tunnel reached its full potential.

In May 2006, in the first two months after the tunnel operators announced a temporary halving of the toll, media reports indicated that usage had increased to approximately 34,000 per day.

In fiscal year 2025, average daily traffic through the tunnel was approximately 38,500 per day.

== Tolls ==
The tunnel is tolled for its entire length, with a lower charge when exiting westbound to Sir John Young Crescent northbound. Truck and heavy vehicle prices are double the price for cars.

Toll prices as of 1 July 2025
Toll road	Class A toll prices (Note: Class A vehicles are typically cars and motorcycles; Class B vehicles are all other vehicles including trucks and heavy vehicles.)	Class B toll prices	Toll increase	Toll concessionaire	Expiry of toll concession
Cross City Tunnel	$3.36 (Sir John Young Crescent exit) $7.12 (otherwise)	$6.72 (Sir John Young Crescent exit) $14.24 (otherwise)	Quarterly on 1 January, 1 April, 1 July, and 1 October by positive quarterly CPI	Transurban	December 2035

== Exits and Interchanges ==
The Cross City Tunnel is entirely contained within the City of Sydney local government area.

Location	km	mi	Destinations	Notes
Darling Harbour	0.0	0.0	Western Distributor (A4 west) - Rozelle, Parramatta, Penrith	Western terminus of Cross City Tunnel; Eastbound tunnel entrance is underneath Bathurst Street; Westbound tunnel exit is underneath Druitt Street
Darling Harbour	0.0	0.0	Harbour Street – Haymarket, Sydney CBD	
Darling Harbour	0.0	0.0	Tunnel western terminus and toll western terminus	
Woolloomooloo	1.4	0.87	Eastern Distributor (M1 south) – Mascot, Sydney Airport	Westbound entrance and eastbound exit only
Woolloomooloo	1.5	0.93	Cahill Expressway (M1 north) – North Sydney; Macquarie Street – Sydney CBD	Westbound exit only
Rushcutters Bay	2.2	1.4	Tunnel eastern terminus and toll eastern terminus	
Rushcutters Bay	2.2	1.4	Bayswater Road (e/bound)/New South Head Road (w/bound) - Edgecliff, Dover Heights, Watsons Bay	Cross City Tunnel eastern terminus
Incomplete access; Tolled; Route transition

== Criticisms ==
There are a number of criticisms that have been made about the Cross City Tunnel (CCT), more so than for similar large capital works programs in Sydney, including the following:

- Disruption to traffic in the CBD not using the tunnel: The CCT attracted significant media attention, as many of the diversions put in place on the streets above caused increased traffic congestion and motorist confusion. Some resentment regarding surface road changes was expressed in the media. The disruption that generated the most complaints was the reduction of William Street to one general lane, and one bus lane in each direction, that exacerbated traffic flow. The bus lanes were converted to T2 transit lanes. On 6 December 2005 the head of the CCT said under oath that the company would not seek compensation if some of the controversial road changes were undone; but on 7 December that decision was reversed.
- Undisclosed contract conditions: It is generally thought that the NSW Government agreed to the lane reductions in William Street as part of the negotiations for the CCT contract. However, the government repeatedly refused to publicly table the contract, much to the dismay of the media and the NSW Auditor-General. A summary of the CCT contract was released, that contained details of additional possible road disruptions, with resultant increased traffic congestion for motorists not using the CCT. It was also revealed that 50 cents of the toll price is due to a $105 million payment that the operators had to make to the NSW Government for permission to build the tunnel. In late October 2005 after ongoing criticism, some contract terms were released to the public, but the government refused to release 3,000 pages of material. A few days after this, the head of the Roads & Traffic Authority was dismissed for failing to disclose an amendment to the contract, which allowed the toll to be increased by 15 cents. In November 2005, the Independent Commission Against Corruption (ICAC) was asked to investigate allegations that sensitive Cabinet documents were leaked to the CCT operator during negotiations. The ICAC found that the allegation was unsubstantiated.
- Misleading signage: There were complaints in the media after the opening of the CCT about deceptive signage indicating the tunnel was the only route from Sydney eastern suburbs to cross Sydney Harbour (in particular, via the Sydney Harbour Tunnel). In response, the NRMA motoring group published a route outlining how to reach the harbour crossings while avoiding the CCT.
- Toll applies in both directions: the toll for the CCT is charged in both directions, unlike other toll roads near the city centre, such as the Sydney Harbour Bridge, the Sydney Harbour Tunnel, and the Eastern Distributor, all of which only charge for travel in one direction.
- Price of the toll: The initial price of the toll for a one-way trip was $6.62 and $3.12 with a tag when exiting on Sir John Young Crescent/Eastern Distributor, and $5.35 without. Some would say this is a high price for a short 2.1 km (1.3 mi) journey when a slightly slower but free alternative is available. Joe Tripodi, at the time Minister for Roads, pressured the CCT operators to reduce the toll, but admitted he cannot force them to do this. The CCT operators had previously ruled out a toll reduction. Additionally, the price of the toll is automatically increased by the CPI each quarter, whereas other tolls are usually increased less frequently, but in neat increments of 50 cents.
- No cash payment, and higher price for drivers without an E-Tag: The CCT was the first cashless motorway in Sydney. Drivers who did not have an E-Tag and who used the tunnel had to phone the CCT operators or go the CCT website after their journey, and pay the toll, plus an additional $2.50 administration fee. Those who didn't do this received two warning letters, then a $130 fine. All other tolled roads/bridges in Sydney have subsequently adopted this model of operation.

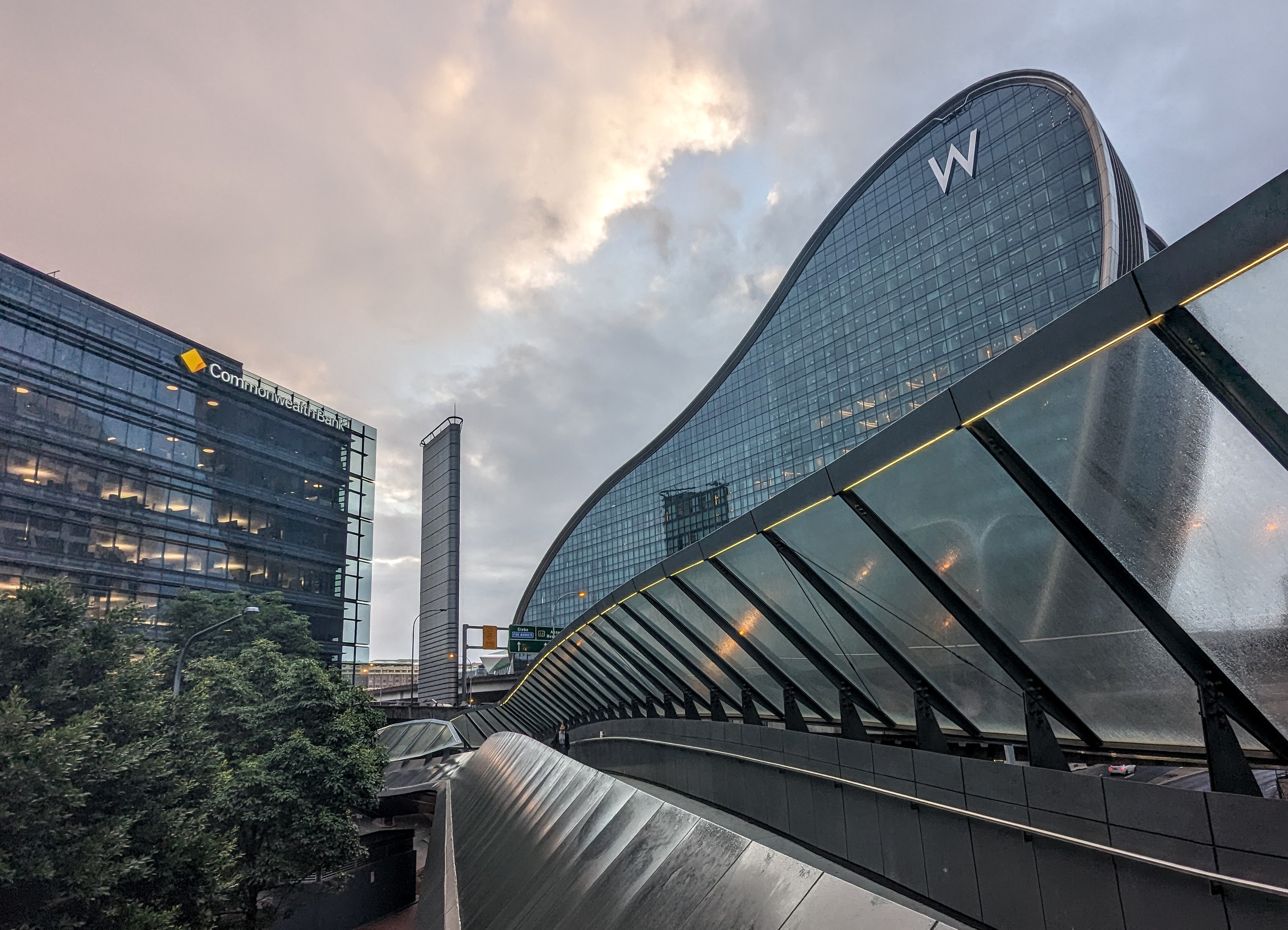
The W hotel (under construction in 2023) and the nearby Cross City Tunnel ventilation stack

- Concerns about exhaust fumes from the tunnel: After opening, the CCT proved to be quite poorly ventilated for the expected number of vehicles, and even for the much lower number of vehicles using it. Currently air is released from the CCT via the single 65-metre-high (213 ft) ventilation stack located between the existing Western Distributor viaducts above the eastern side of Darling Harbour. There is general unease in Sydney about exhaust stacks from any motorway, after reports in the media about people living near motorway exhaust stacks experiencing health problems. However, since the opening of the CCT there was almost no discussion of this topic, with most of the focus directed towards the issues listed above, together with general concerns regarding Public Private Partnerships (or PPPs).

One of the tunnel's major shortcomings is the fact that traffic is forced straight onto suburban roads at both ends, creating additional traffic congestion at these locations. This is likely to be rectified at the Western end when construction of the M4 East Tunnels and the Rozelle Interchange are completed in 2023.

In September 2005, as part of the media attention surrounding these criticisms, a local newspaper commissioned an audit of the usage of the tollway by independent surveyors who found that on a single day, around 21,000 vehicles had used the tunnel. This was countered by a spokesman for the tunnel operator, who said about 550,000 vehicles had used the tunnel in its initial operation, at an average of approximately 25,000 cars per day.

In October 2005, a call centre handling calls related to the Cross City Tunnel halved its staff due to the low number of calls.

In September 2006 the Sydney Morning Herald reported that the operator had not pursued for 12 months motorists who had not paid the toll (along with the M2 Hills Motorway) due to a lack of agreement on a system for passing of the details to the RTA. The Cross City Motorway subsequently promised that toll evaders will be pursued.

== See also ==
- Freeways in Australia
- Freeways in Sydney
