= Bayswater Road, Sydney =

Street in Sydney, Australia

Bayswater Road, Sydney New South Wales
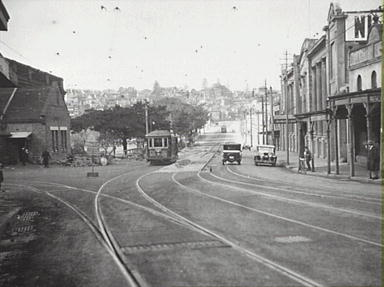
- Bayswater Road in Kings Cross in 1929
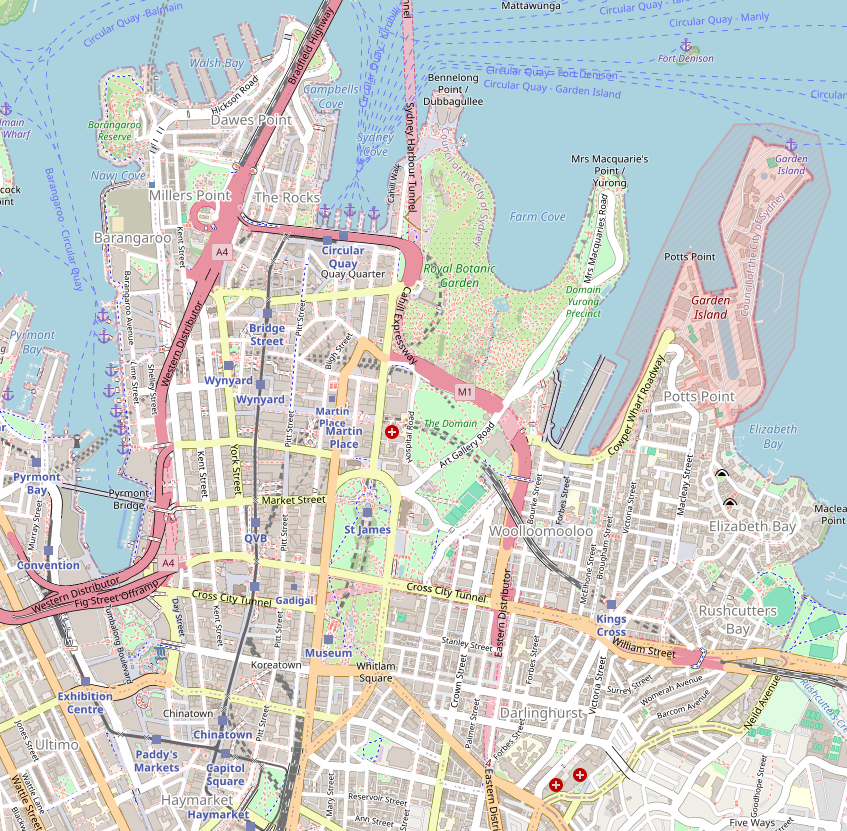
- Coordinates: 33.874768°S 151.222531°E (West end); 33.876215°S 151.226860°E (East end)

General information
- Type: Street
- Length: 700 m (0.4 mi)
- Gazetted: December 1964
- Former route number: State Route 76 (1976–2004) (through Rushcutters Bay)

Major junctions
- West end: Darlinghurst Road; Potts Point, Sydney
- William Street
- East end: New South Head Road; Rushcutters Bay, Sydney

Bayswater Road is a 700-metre-long (2,300 ft) minor street in the Kings Cross district of Sydney, New South Wales, Australia.

== Route ==
Bayswater Road commences at the intersection with Darlinghurst Road in Potts Point and heads east over a short rise and down a hill towards Rushcutters Bay where, east of Ward Avenue and west of Roslyn Street, vehicular traffic in the street able to head in one way direction, from west to east only. At Roslyn Street, through traffic is not permitted, with all traffic directed north on Roslyn Street. East of the junction of Roslyn Street and Bayswater Road, southbound traffic on Roslyn Street is also directed one way, east, on Bayswater Road. From this point Bayswater Road merges with William Street and, adjacent to Rushcutters Bay Park, the street continues as New South Head Road.

The western end of the street is lined with nightspots, eateries, adult venues, dance clubs hotels, and is a popular destination for both Sydneysiders and tourists. It is considered to be a more upmarket precinct of Kings Cross, when compared with Darlingurst Road.

== History ==
The passing of the Main Roads Act of 1924 through the Parliament of New South Wales provided for the declaration of Main Roads, roads partially funded by the State government through the Main Roads Board (MRB). With the subsequent passing of the Main Roads (Amendment) Act of 1929 to provide for additional declarations of State Highways and Trunk Roads, the Department of Main Roads (having succeeded the MRB in 1932) extended the western end of Main Road 173 from New South Head Road further west along Bayswater Road to William Street (and continuing west along William Street towards Woolloomooloo) on 2 December 1964.

The passing of the Roads Act of 1993 updated road classifications and the way they could be declared within New South Wales. Under this act, William Street retains its declaration as part of Main Road 173.

The route was allocated State Route 76 through Rushcutters Bay in 1976, after the opening of the Kings Cross Tunnel, but was completely decommissioned in 2004.

A busy electric tramway to Watsons Bay once ran down the thoroughfare, this was closed in 1960, replaced by buses.

== Major intersections ==
LGA	Location	km	mi	Destinations	Notes
Sydney	Potts Point	0.0	0.0	Darlinghurst Road - Kings Cross, Darlinghurst	Western terminus of road
Sydney	Rushcutters Bay	0.3	0.19	Roslyn Street (one-way southbound) – Kings Cross	
Sydney	Rushcutters Bay–Darlinghurst boundary	0.4	0.25	William Street (one-way eastbound) - Rushcutters Bay	Eastbound traffic from Kings Cross Tunnel only
Sydney	Rushcutters Bay–Darlinghurst boundary	0.6	0.37	MacLachlan Avenue (one-way northbound) - Darlinghurst	
Sydney–Woollahra boundary	Rushcutters Bay–Darling Point–Edgecliff tripoint	0.7	0.43	Neild Avenue (one-way southbound) - Darlinghurst	
Sydney–Woollahra boundary	Rushcutters Bay–Darling Point–Edgecliff tripoint	0.7	0.43	New South Head Road - Double Bay, Vaucluse, Watsons Bay	Eastern terminus of road
Incomplete access; Route transition

== See also ==
- City of Sydney
