= William Street, Sydney =

Road in Sydney, New South Wales, Australia

William Street, Sydney New South Wales
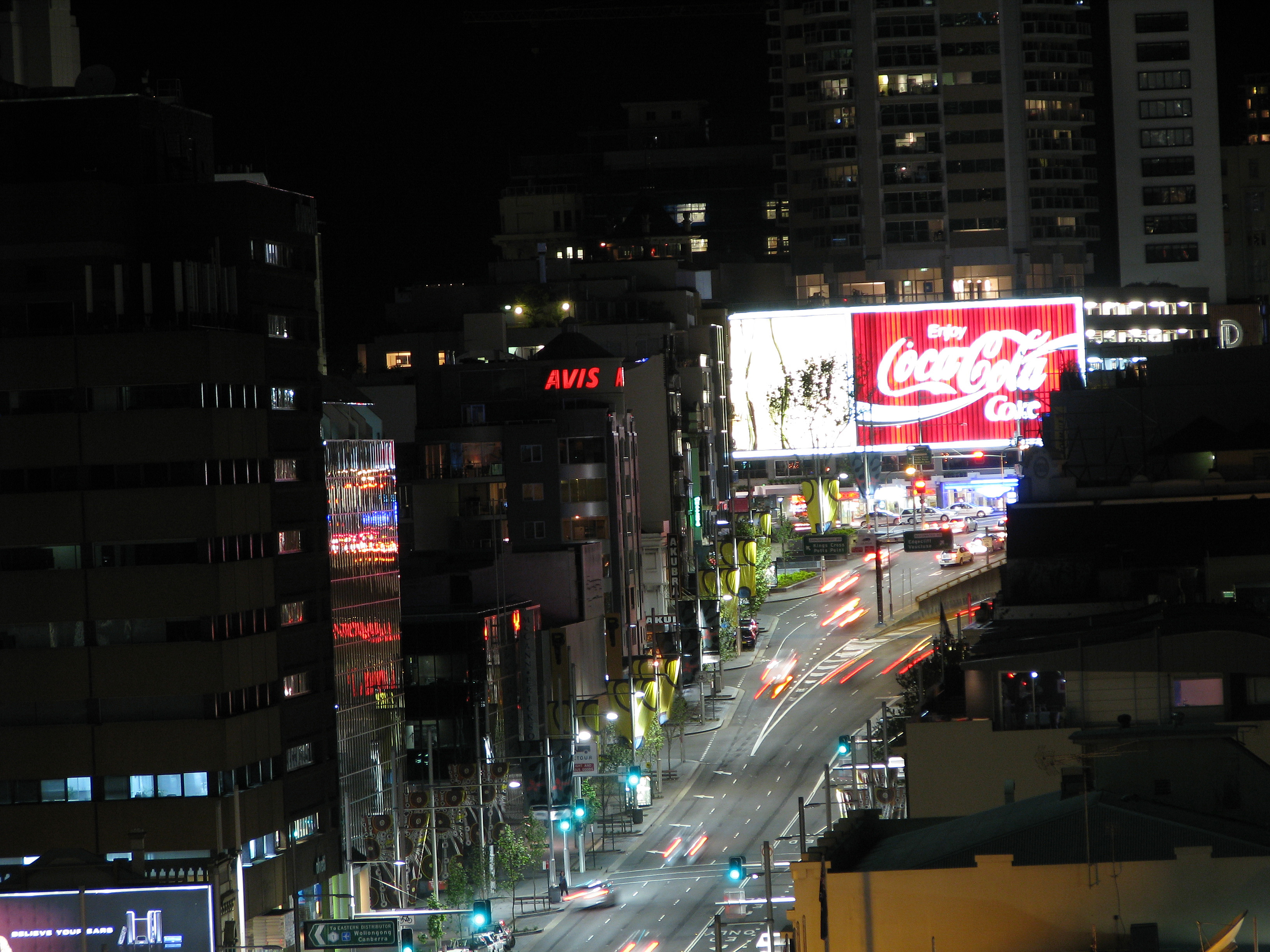
- William Street with the Coca-Cola billboard in 2008
- Coordinates: 33.873683°S 151.212588°E (West end); 33.876670°S 151.227222°E (East end)

General information
- Type: Street
- Length: 1.4 km (0.9 mi)
- Opened: 1834
- Gazetted: December 1964
- Former route number: State Route 76 (1976–2004)

Major junctions
- West end: Park Street; Sydney CBD
- College Street; Crown Street; Victoria Street; Cross City Tunnel
- East end: New South Head Road; Bayswater Road; Rushcutters Bay, Sydney

William Street is a 1.4-kilometre-long (0.87 mi) major thoroughfare in Sydney, New South Wales, Australia. The street was named in honour of king William IV of the United Kingdom of Great Britain and Ireland upon its opening in 1834.

== Route ==
William Street commences at the intersection of Park and College Streets on the eastern edge of Hyde Park in the Sydney central business district and heads in an easterly direction as a four-lane, single carriageway road, widening into a dual-carriageway road just before it enters the Kings Cross Tunnel, before ending at the junction with Barcom Avenue, Waratah Street, Bayswater Road and New South Head Road in Rushcutters Bay. The street runs along the border for between the two suburbs of Woolloomooloo and Darlinghurst for most of its length.

The Cross City Tunnel, a tolled motorway, follows much of the route of William Street and extends further west to the Western Distributor. The tunnel was constructed in an attempt to ease traffic congestion for through traffic across the east-west of the CBD.

William Street is closed to vehicular traffic for the City2Surf fun run and race, held in August annually.

== History ==
William Street was built through the farm land of the valley between the city centre and Potts Point in the 1830s to allow traffic to and from the fashionable and expensive Eastern suburbs around Elizabeth Bay. Originally the NSW Surveyor-General Thomas Mitchell wanted the street to be further to the south, but whilst he was away exploring the interior of Australia, the street was constructed in its present location.

In the 1880s notable Australian poet Henry Lawson lived in a boarding house along William Street before he became famous for his poetry and also wrote a poem titled William Street. In 1909 it was decided to resume the south side of the street to widen the street into a larger boulevard style. The resuming was conducted between 1910 and 1914.

In the 1930s, William Street was the location of a number of pubs and nightclubs, including the Strand Hotel, the Prince Albert Hotel and the infamous Fifty-Fifty Club, where sex workers were provided by Tilly Devine.

During the period between World War I and World War II, William Street was the bustling centre of Sydney's automotive trade, with Yorks Motors in William House set up as the sole New South Wales distributor of Plymouth and Chrysler cars in 1932. William Street also once housed recording studios for the Australian Broadcasting Commission. The Watsons Bay tram service was opened in 1894 travelling along William Street and operated until circa 1901. Tram services were electrified in 1905. Motor buses were introduced after World War I. During the 1930s, the tram service from William Street through Kings Cross ran as frequently as one tram per minute during weekdays. With the combination of trams, buses and cars, the William Street, Darlinghurst Road and Victoria Street junction (Kings Cross) became one of Sydney's busiest intersections and worst bottlenecks. The tram line on William Street and through Kings Cross was closed on 10 July 1960, superseded by buses and later, the Eastern Suburbs railway line.

The passing of the Main Roads Act of 1924 through the Parliament of New South Wales provided for the declaration of Main Roads, roads partially funded by the State government through the Main Roads Board (MRB). With the subsequent passing of the Main Roads (Amendment) Act of 1929 to provide for additional declarations of State Highways and Trunk Roads, the Department of Main Roads (having succeeded the MRB in 1932) extended the western end of Main Road 173 from its old terminus at the intersection of William Street and New South Head Road further west along William Street to its intersection with Palmer Street in Woolloomooloo on 2 December 1964, and eventually again further to the intersection with Crown Street on 22 January 1993.

The Kings Cross Tunnel sits at the eastern end of William Street extending the carriageway to Rushcutters Bay. The cut and cover tunnel was constructed as part of the Eastern Suburbs railway line and required the resumption and demolition of 118 properties. It was opened on 15 December 1975. In November 1987, a tunnel opened beneath William Street to carry traffic coming off the Cahill Expressway towards Taylor Square, as part of the Stage 1 of the Eastern Distributor.

The passing of the Roads Act of 1993 updated road classifications and the way they could be declared within New South Wales. Under this act, William Street retains its declaration as part of Main Road 173.

The route was allocated State Route 76 in 1976, after the opening of the Kings Cross Tunnel, but was completely decommissioned in 2004.

== Major intersections ==
William Street is entirely contained within the City of Sydney local government area.

Location	km	mi	Destinations	Notes
Sydney CBD–Darlinghurst boundary	0.0	0.0	Park Street – Sydney CBD	Western terminus of street
Sydney CBD–Darlinghurst boundary	0.0	0.0	College Street – Sydney CBD, Haymarket, Redfern	
Woolloomooloo–Darlinghurst boundary	0.3	0.19	Crown Street - Woolloomooloo, Surry Hills	No right turn eastbound or westbound into Crown Street
Woolloomooloo–Darlinghurst boundary	0.4	0.25	Palmer Street - Woolloomooloo, Potts Point to Eastern Distributor (M1 north) - North Sydney	No right turn eastbound into Palmer Street
Woolloomooloo–Darlinghurst boundary	0.5	0.31	Bourke Street - Woolloomooloo. Darlinghurst to Eastern Distributor (M1 south) – Botany, Sydney Airport	No right turn eastbound into Bourke Street; No right turn northbound or southbound from Bourke Street
Darlinghurst–Potts Point boundary	0.9	0.56	Darlinghurst Road - Kings Cross, Darlinghurst]] Victoria Street (one-way southbound) - Darlinghurst, St Vincent's Hospital; Kings Cross Road (one-way eastbound) – Kings Cross; Craigend Street (one-way westbound) - Darlinghurst	Western portal of Kings Cross Tunnel
Darlinghurst–Rushcutters Bay boundary	1.3	0.81	Cross City Tunnel – Haymarket	Western entrance and eastern exit only
Darlinghurst–Rushcutters Bay boundary	1.3	0.81	Kings Cross Road (one-way eastbound) – Kings Cross; Craigend Street (one-way westbound) - Darlinghurst	
Darlinghurst–Rushcutters Bay boundary	1.4	0.87	Waratah Street (one-way northbound) - Rushcutters Bay; Barcom Street (one-way southbound) - Darlinghurst	
Darlinghurst–Rushcutters Bay boundary	1.4	0.87	Bayswater Road (one-way eastbound) – Kings Cross; New South Head Road (one-way westbound) - Double Bay, Vaucluse, Watsons Bay	Eastern terminus of street
Incomplete access; Tolled; Route transition

== Gallery ==
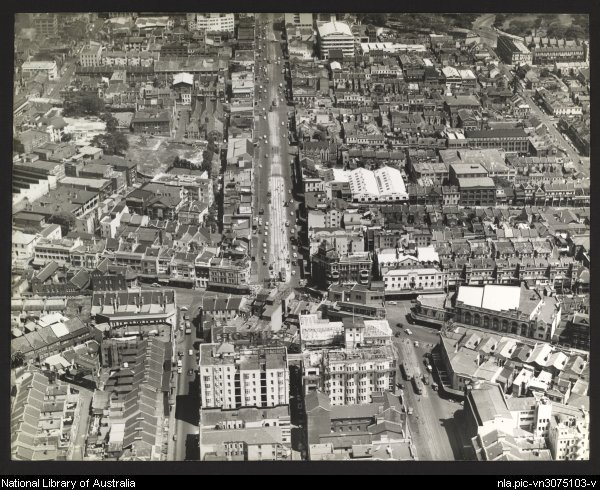
William Street from the air in the 1950s

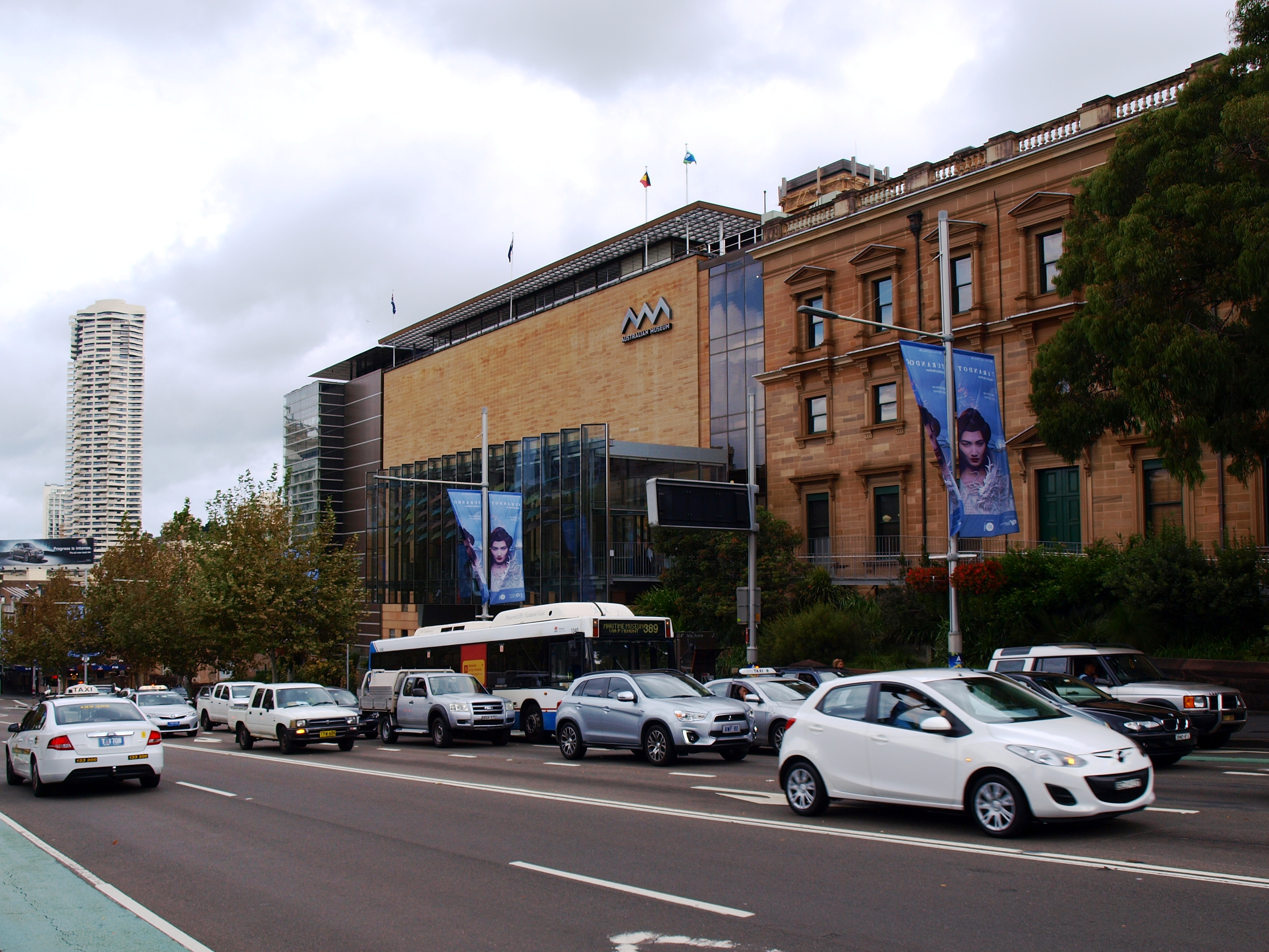
William Street near Australian Museum

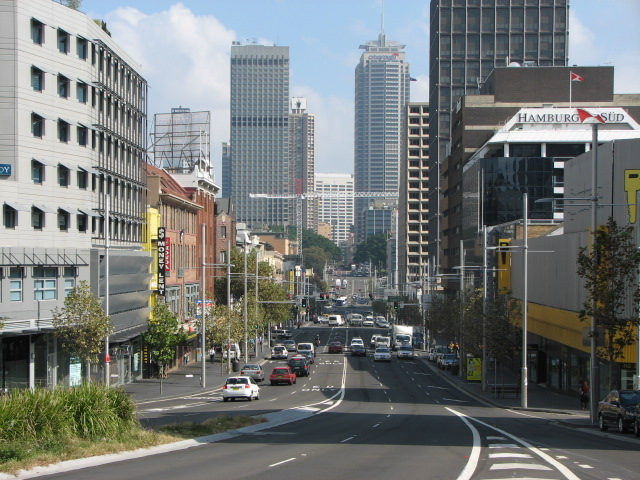
William Street as seen from Kings Cross

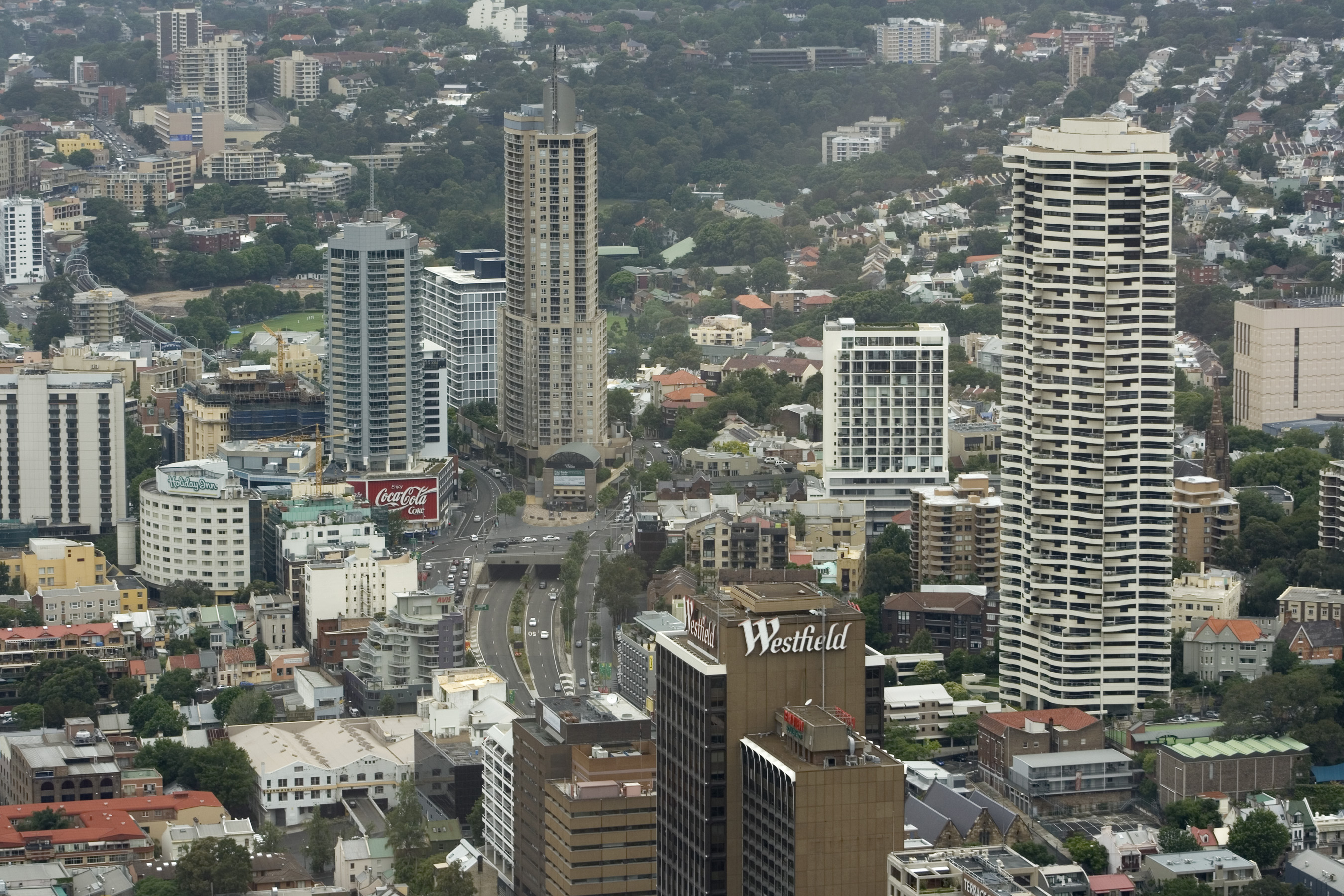
William Street from Sydney Tower with the Victoria Street, Darlinghurst Road and Bayswater Road diamond interchange
