= William House =

William House may refer to:

== People ==
- William John House, British soldier, VC recipient
- William F. House, American doctor, pioneer of cochlear implants
- Bill House, American rock climber, first technical ascent of Devil's Tower National Monument
- Will House (cricketer), English cricketer
- William House (trade unionist), British miners' leader

== Places ==
- H. B. William House, Sarasota, Florida, listed on the U.S. National Register of Historic Places
- The William Forst House, an historic building in Russellville, Kentucky
- William House (building), a heritage building in Darlinghurst, New South Wales, Australia

== See also ==
- Williams House (disambiguation)
