= Rushcutters Bay Sewage Pumping Station =

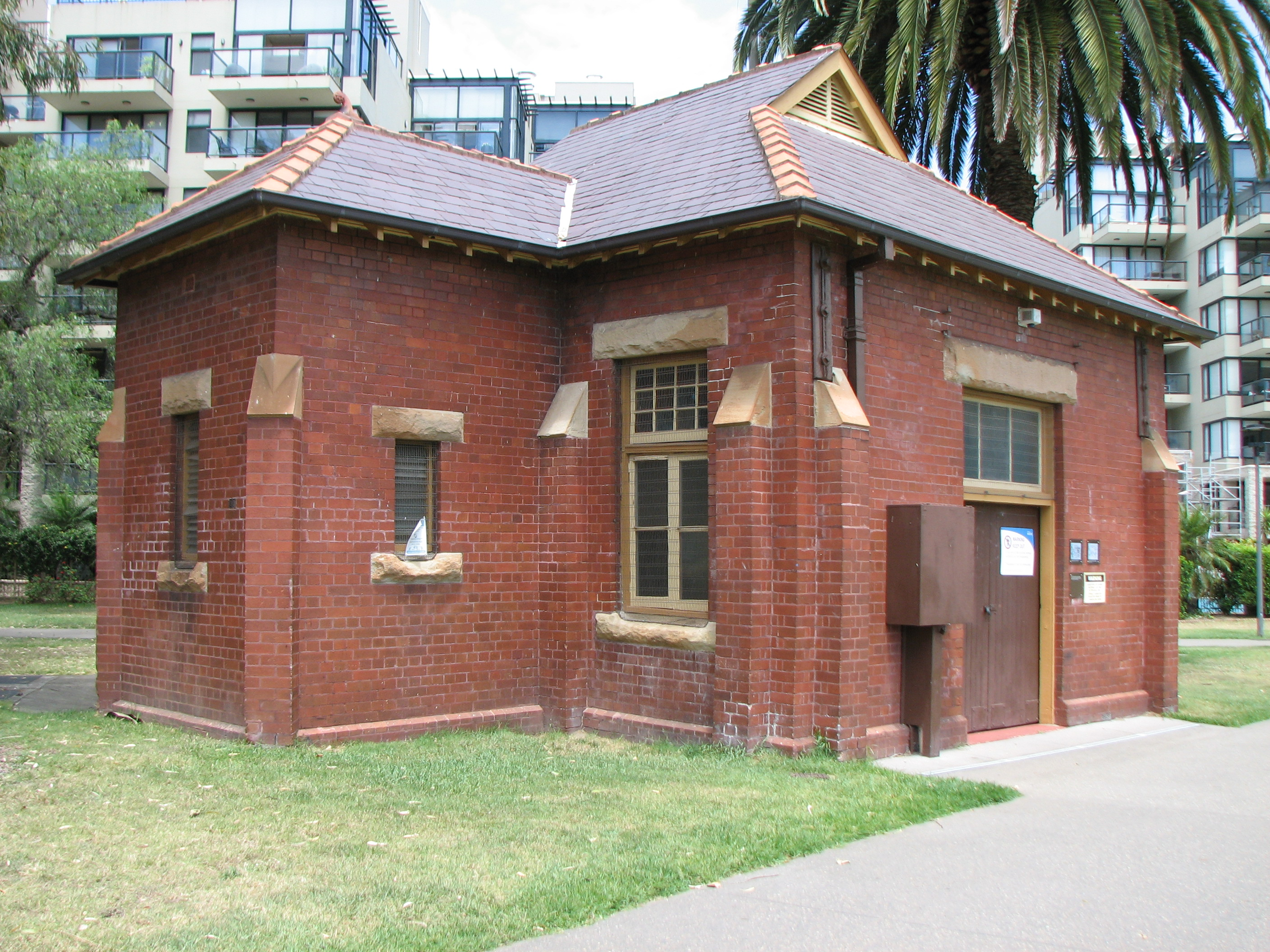
- Rushcutters Bay sewage pumping station 18

- Location within Sydney Location within Australia
- 33°52′31″S 151°13′46″E
- Location: Rushcutters Bay Park, Rushcutters Bay, Sydney, New South Wales, Australia

History
- Built: 1902–1904

Site notes
- Architect: New South Wales Public Works Department
- Architectural style: Federation Queen Anne
- Owner: Sydney Water

New South Wales Heritage Register
- Official name: Sewage Pumping Station 18; SPS 18
- Type: State heritage (built)
- Designated: 18 November 1999
- Reference no.: 1339
- Type: Sewage Pump House/Pumping Station
- Category: Utilities – Sewerage
- Builders: New South Wales Public Works Department

The Rushcutters Bay Sewage Pumping Station is a heritage-listed sewerage pumping station located at Rushcutters Bay Park in the inner city Sydney suburb of Rushcutters Bay in the City of Sydney local government area of New South Wales, Australia. It was designed and built by the New South Wales Public Works Department from 1902 to 1904. It is also known as Sewage Pumping Station 18 and SPS 18. The property is owned by Sydney Water. It was added to the New South Wales State Heritage Register on 18 November 1999.

== History ==
=== Rushcutters' Bay ===
Local William Thomas was granted 16 hectares (40 acres) at the head of the bay in 1818 by Governor Macquarie, after one of his children was injured by Macquarie's carriage. Much of this land was reclaimed in 1878 to form a park.

Rushcutters' Bay gets its name from the rushes that were cut from nearby swamps to thatch the early houses of the Sydney settlement. In the 19th century this process was called rush cutting at the bay.

These major reed swamps were located near where White City tennis courts are today. This area of land has had a number of uses. After being drained and cleared the swamp land was replaced with extensive Chinese market gardens. Then, in 1913 the gardens were removed and the land transformed into an open air amusement park. In 1908 Sydney Stadium had been built on the corner of New South Head Road and Nield Avenue for the World Heavyweight title bout between Tommy Burns and Jack Johnson. This became known as the fight of the century and was won by Johnson, the first African-American world champion. The Beatles performed at Sydney Stadium in 1964. The stadium was demolished in 1970 to make way for the Eastern Suburbs railway line.

White City Tennis courts were built in 1922 as the venue for the NSW Championships, now known as the Sydney International. It hosted this competition until moving to Homebush Bay ahead of the 2000 Sydney Olympic Games.

Reg Bartley Oval is named after a Lord Mayor of Sydney, who served from 1943–44 and 1946–48.

=== Sydney's sewerage system ===
In 1859 Sydney's sewerage system consisted of five outfall sewers which drained to Sydney Harbour. By the 1870s, the harbour had become grossly polluted (especially with the nearby abattoir at Glebe Island) and three outbreaks of enteric fever (typhoid) throughout the period 1870s to 1890s. As a result, the NSW Government created the Sydney City and Suburban Health Board to investigate an alternative means of disposing of the City's sewage. This led to the construction of two gravitation sewers in 1889 by the Public Works Department: a northern sewer being the Bondi Ocean Outfall Sewer and a southern sewer draining to a sewerage farm at Botany Bay. Low-lying areas around the harbour which could not gravitate to the new outfall sewers continued to drain to the old City Council Harbour sewers. Low-level pumping stations were therefore needed to collect the sewage from such areas and pump it by means of additional sewers known as rising mains, to the main gravitation system. The first comprehensive low-level sewerage system began at the end of the 19th century when the Public Works Department built a network of twenty low-level pumping stations around the foreshores of the inner harbour and handed them over to the Metropolitan Board of Water Supply and Sewerage in 1904. Overall, greater Sydney now has over 600 low-level sewage pumping stations. At least two of the early stations received their DC power from the Rushcutters Bay Tramway Powerhouse, near SP0018. Although called SPS No 1 the first SPS was the 1894 emergency Shone Ejector at St Peters (coal-fired electricity) followed by the Double Bay Compressed Air Ejector Station (electricity from Rushcutters Bay) and the coal-fired steam-driven Marrickville Pumping Station (later SPS 271).

== Description ==
SP0018, Rushcutters Bay is a low-level sewage pumping station located adjacent to Rushcutters Bay Park. It consists of two distinct parts: a superstructure comprising a rectangular single-storey loadbearing brick building; and a substructure constructed of concrete which houses machinery and sewage chambers. Architecturally, the building was designed in a utilitarian version of the Federation Queen Anne style. Externally there is a slate gambrel roof with terracotta hip and ridge cappings with timber louvre gable vents and exposed eaves; double casement timber windows with multi paned fanlights; timber framed, ledged and sheeted double doors; dark red-brown tuck pointed brickwork laid in English bond with splayed brick plinth and engaged brick piers capped with rubbed sandstone; and rocked faced sandstone sills and lintels. Internally, the ceiling is lined with tongue and grooved boarding and walls are rendered and lined out to simulate ashlar coursing.

=== Modifications and dates ===
Substantially intact. Most of the mechanical and electrical components were upgraded during the 1970s.

== Heritage listing ==
As at 7 June 2005, SP0018 Rushcutters Bay is of historic, aesthetic and technical/research significance. Historically it was one of an original group of twenty low-level sewage pumping stations constructed at the end of the 19th century to serve Sydney. The station along with the construction of the Bondi Ocean Outfall Sewer (ten years earlier) formed a part of the major advance in the protection of the public health of Sydney by ending the discharge of sewage into the harbour. They were built as a direct response to the outbreaks of Enteric Fever (Typhoid) which plagued Sydney from the 1870s to 1890s and the recommendations of the Sydney City and Suburban Health Board (which was established by the NSW government in 1875 to report on the best means of sewage disposal) which proposed the establishment of outfall sewers. Aesthetically, it is an excellent example of a small scale industrial building designed in the Federation Queen Anne style. In its surviving fabric SP0018 reflects the importance of Federation Period public utilities, which is evident in the technical excellence of the overall design, traditional construction techniques and craftsmanship such as the stone dressings and tuckpointed brickwork. Due to its prominent location in Rushcutters Bay Park, the station makes a valuable contribution to the local cultural landscape. The pumping station still fulfils its role nearly a century after its introduction as a low-level sewage pumping station as originally designed and constructed, albeit with mechanical upgrading. It has educational and interpretation potential to reveal information about sewage pumping engineering and in architectural taste in a period when utilitarian buildings were given as much careful attention as public buildings. The station is a prominent feature of Rushcutters Bay Park and makes a valuable contribution to the townscape and cultural landscape of Rushcutters Bay.

Sewage Pumping Station 18 was listed on the New South Wales State Heritage Register on 18 November 1999 having satisfied the following criteria.

The place is important in demonstrating the course, or pattern, of cultural or natural history in New South Wales.

SP0018, Rushcutters Bay was built in 1902 and was among the original group of 20 low-level sewage pumping stations constructed to serve Sydney. The pumping stations along with the construction of the Bondi and Southern Outfall Sewers, formed a part of the major advance in the protection of the public health of Sydney buy ending the discharge of sewage into the harbour. The construction of SP0018 evidences the growth of Sydney and expansion of municipal services during the early part of the 20th century.

The place is important in demonstrating aesthetic characteristics and/or a high degree of creative or technical achievement in New South Wales.

SP0018 is an excellent example of a robust and well proportioned small scale industrial Federation Queen Anne style building which displays in its fabric a combination of superior utilitarian design, construction and craftsmanship. The scale, colour, texture and detail of the building makes an effective contribution to cultural landscape of Rushcutters Bay.

The place has a strong or special association with a particular community or cultural group in New South Wales for social, cultural or spiritual reasons.

Item is listed on the National Trust (NSW) register and is thus recognised by an identifiable group, and as such has importance to the broader community. The excellent design of the superstructure by the Department of Public Works reflects the body of work emanating from the then Government Architect, Walter Liberty Vernon.

The place has potential to yield information that will contribute to an understanding of the cultural or natural history of New South Wales.

SP0018 has the potential to reveal information about early 20th century construction techniques and design of the concrete substructure. The pumping station still fulfills its role nearly a century after its introduction as a low-level sewage pumping station as originally designed and constructed albeit with some mechanical upgrading.

The place possesses uncommon, rare or endangered aspects of the cultural or natural history of New South Wales.

SP0018 is unique as part of the group of first generation low-level sewage pumping stations built to serve the historically significant Bondi Ocean Outfall Sewer.

The place is important in demonstrating the principal characteristics of a class of cultural or natural places/environments in New South Wales.

The superstructure is a representative example of a small scale Federation Queen Anne style public utility building. SP0018 is a representative example of a low-level sewage pumping station on the Bondi Ocean Outfall Sewer.

== See also ==
- Sydney Water
