= Watsons Bay =

- Suburb
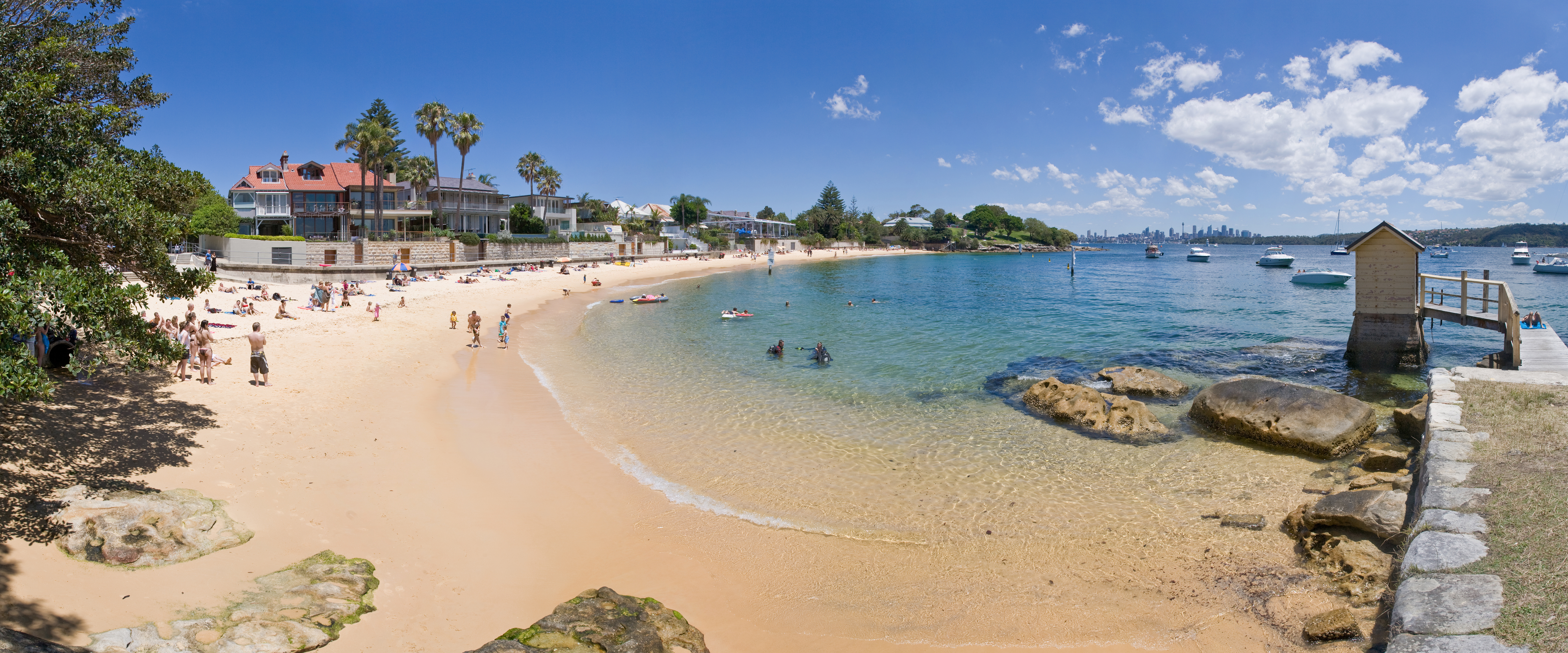
- Camp Cove beach in Watsons Bay

- Interactive map of Watsons Bay
- Country: Australia
- State: New South Wales
- City: Sydney
- LGA: Municipality of Woollahra
- Location: 11 km (6.8 mi) north-east of Sydney CBD
- Established: 1801

Government
  - State electorate: Vaucluse
  - Federal division: Wentworth

Area
  - Total: 0.6 km^{2} (0.23 sq mi)
- Elevation: 6 m (20 ft)

Population
  - Total: 883 (SAL 2021)
- Postcode: 2030
Suburbs around Watsons Bay
Clifton Gardens	Manly	Tasman Sea
Mosman	Watsons Bay	Tasman Sea
Vaucluse	Vaucluse	Tasman Sea

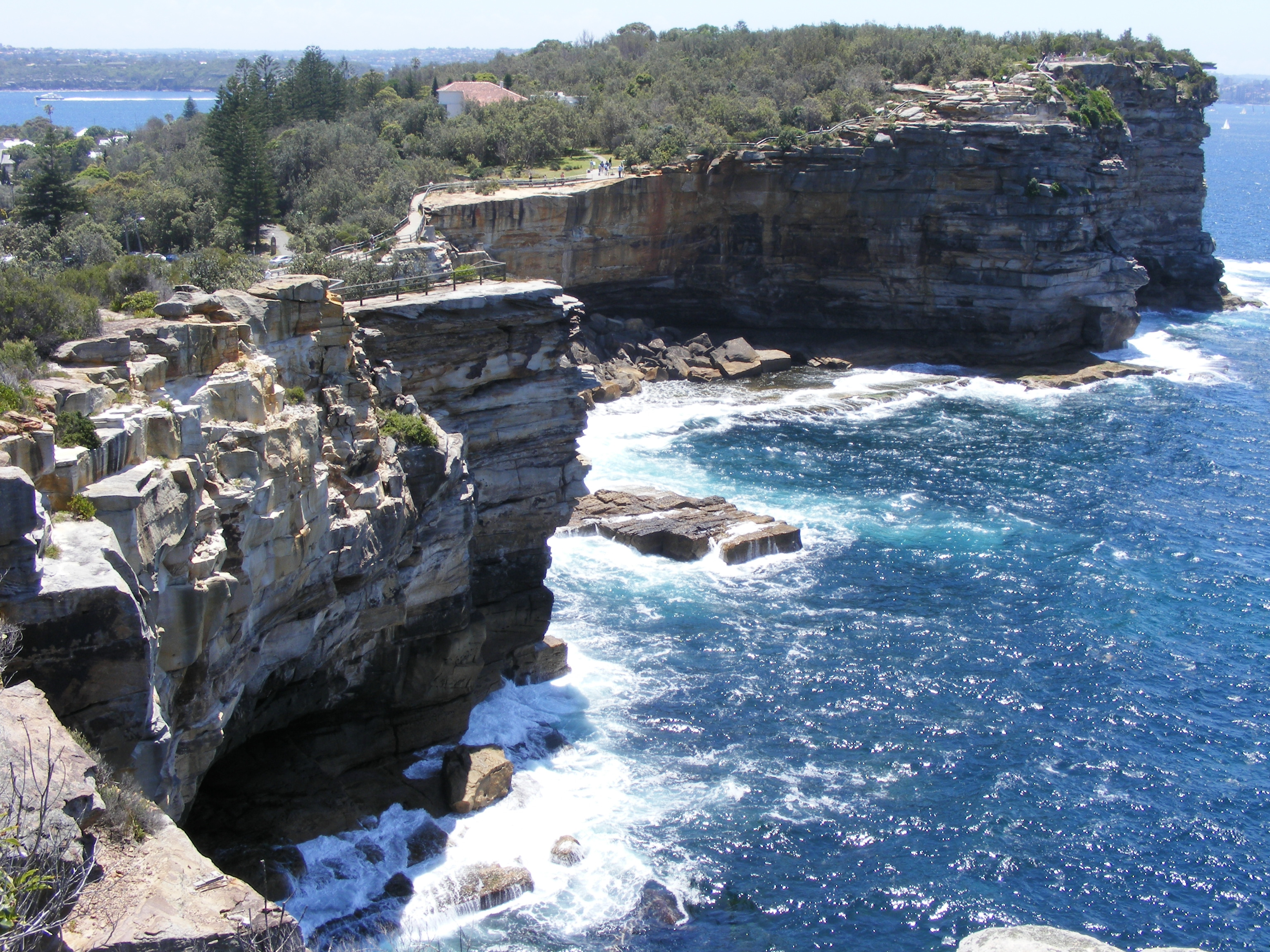
View of (The Gap), Watsons Bay, looking north

Watsons Bay is a harbourside, eastern suburb of Sydney, in the state of New South Wales, Australia. Watsons Bay is located 11 km north-east of the Sydney central business district, in the local government area of the Municipality of Woollahra.

Watsons Bay sits on the end of the South Head peninsula and takes its name from the sheltered bay and anchorage on its western side, in Port Jackson (Sydney Harbour). It provides views across the harbour to the Sydney Harbour Bridge. The Gap is an ocean cliff on the eastern side with views to Manly at North Head and the Pacific Ocean. Vaucluse is the only adjacent suburb, to the south.

== History ==
=== Aboriginal history ===
The original inhabitants of the area that is now known as Watsons Bay, were the Cadigal people. The Cadigal referred to the area as Kutti. This indigenous group of people fished and collected shellfish in the waters and bays off South Head. They acquired their resources from Camp Cove and carved rock engravings there, which have since eroded from the cliff faces and rock surfaces that line the coastline.

=== European settlement ===
The first Europeans arrived at the location on 21 January 1788 as the First Fleet landed and stayed overnight on Camp Cove. A lookout was later built on the cliffs in 1790. The first grant of 20 acres (81,000 m^{2}) was made to Edward Laing in 1793 in the Camp Cove Area. Early homes were built for government and military officials working at the local installations.

Watson's Bay was named after Robert Watson (1756–1819), formerly of HMS Sirius, when he had to beach his three vessels at Camp Cove for many years because of their being potentially sold by the Provost Marshal. Watson was appointed harbour pilot and harbourmaster of the port of Sydney in 1811 and the first superintendent of Macquarie Lighthouse in 1816.

Watsons Bay remained an isolated fishing village until development began in the 1860s. The population grew from three dozen in 1828 to 122 in 1841. Subdivision started in the 1850s. After a ferry service opened in the 1870's, a number of hotels were opened.

Today, The Gap is known as a notorious suicide spot.

=== Dunbar ===
The Dunbar was wrecked near the entrance to Sydney Harbour, Australia in 1857 with the loss of 121 lives. The wreck of the Dunbar ranks as one of Australia's worst maritime disasters, with the event still retained in the social history of Sydney and NSW. The Dunbar had mistaken the bay of The Gap for the harbour entrance. This led to the construction of the Hornby Lighthouse. In 1910, at Jacob’s Ladder, the anchor from the ship was recovered along with other relics and were placed in a museum behind the old Town Hall in Military Road by Vaucluse Council. The anchor was transferred to the cliffs of Gap Park by Ald. Coombes and a memorial was unveiled in August 1930.

=== Trams ===
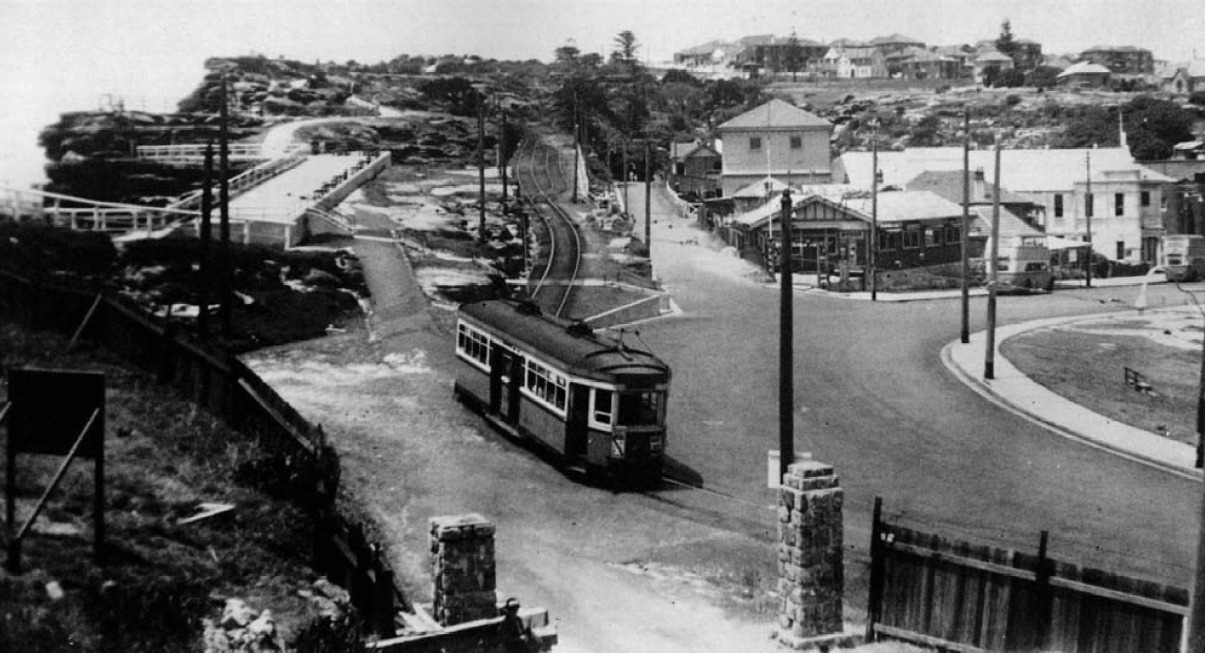
Former tram terminus, Gap Park, c1949

The City to Watson's Bay tram line was extended from Edgecliff to Signal Hill Station, Watson's Bay in 1903 with further extensions to Gap Park in 1909. The latter extension included a new tram terminus adjacent to The Gap and a tram cutting cut into the rock face in Gap Park that ran above and parallel to Gap Road that gradually descended to street level before terminating.

The line from the city commenced with a loop at the corner of Erskine and Day Streets near Wynyard station. It then proceeded south down Day Street before turning left into King Street passing through Queen's Square at St James station. It then made a right hand turn into College Street, and headed south before turning left into Boomerang Street. The line then continued left into William Street, through King's Cross and then along Bayswater Road and into New South Head Road at Rushcutters Bay. The line then followed the course of New and Old South Head Roads before turning right into Gap Park. After turning right into Gap Park a single track passed through narrow rock cuttings, low cliffs and rugged back-drops, turning its way down to the terminus at Watsons Bay.

The line had its own depot and city terminus and operated independently, although it was connected to the main Sydney tram network. In 1949, the line from Rose Bay to Watson's Bay closed, but reopened in 1950 due to public protest. In 1950, the line down King Street to Erskine Street closed and a new terminus constructed at Queens Square. The remainder of the line closed in 1960, the tracks were removed and in 1964 the Council re-vegetated the area around the former tramway cutting in gap park with the object of restoring the area.

When walking up the steps to The Gap at Watsons Bay, there is flat ground in between two sets of steps. This continues for a fair way in both directions, and is the old tram right of way.

The present-day Transdev John Holland route 324 follows the route of the former tram line as far as the point where the tramway turned off Old South Head Road into Gap Park. The bus and tram routes meet again near the terminus in Military Road.

=== Sydney Harbour defences during WWII ===
In 1942, during World War II, the Sydney Harbour anti-submarine boom net was constructed on Georges Head to prevent enemy submarines from entering Sydney Harbour. The boom net spanned the entire width of Port Jackson and a boom net winch house was located on Laings Point, Watsons Bay.

On the night of 31 May 1942, three Japanese midget submarines attempted to enter Sydney Harbour in what became known as the attack on Sydney Harbour. One of the Japanese midget submarines became entangled in the boom net; and, after unsuccessful attempts to free the submarine, the crew detonated charges within the sub, killing themselves and destroying their sub in the process.

During this period, Nielsen Park was used as an anti-aircraft base. The base had its own interim wooden barracks, searchlights and anti-aircraft guns.

In Gap Park, a gun emplacement for a small calibre gun, which was never installed was also intended for use during World War II.

=== Christina Stead ===
The novelist Christina Stead lived in 14 Pacific Street from 1911 to 1928, after which she went overseas. The house is marked with a plaque mounted in the footpath. Stead was the first writer chosen for the Woollahra Council Plaque Scheme, which was inaugurated in 2014.

The house, known as Boongarre or Boongaree was built in the 1870s. It was owned by the Stead family from 1918 to 1980 and is sometimes known as Stead House. It was later acquired by the soccer player Mark Schwarzer. In 2011, Woollahra Council voted to confirm the heritage status of the house. It is now listed on the council's heritage list.

== Population ==
At the 2021 census, 883 people were recorded in Watsons Bay. 62.6% of people were born in Australia and 80.0% of people only spoke English at home. The most common responses for religion were No Religion 33.5% and Catholic 19.8%.

In the 2016 census, there were 850 people in Watsons Bay. 64.6% of people were born in Australia and 78.0% of people only spoke English at home. The most common responses for religion were No Religion 33.8% and Catholic 19.2%.

== Landmarks ==
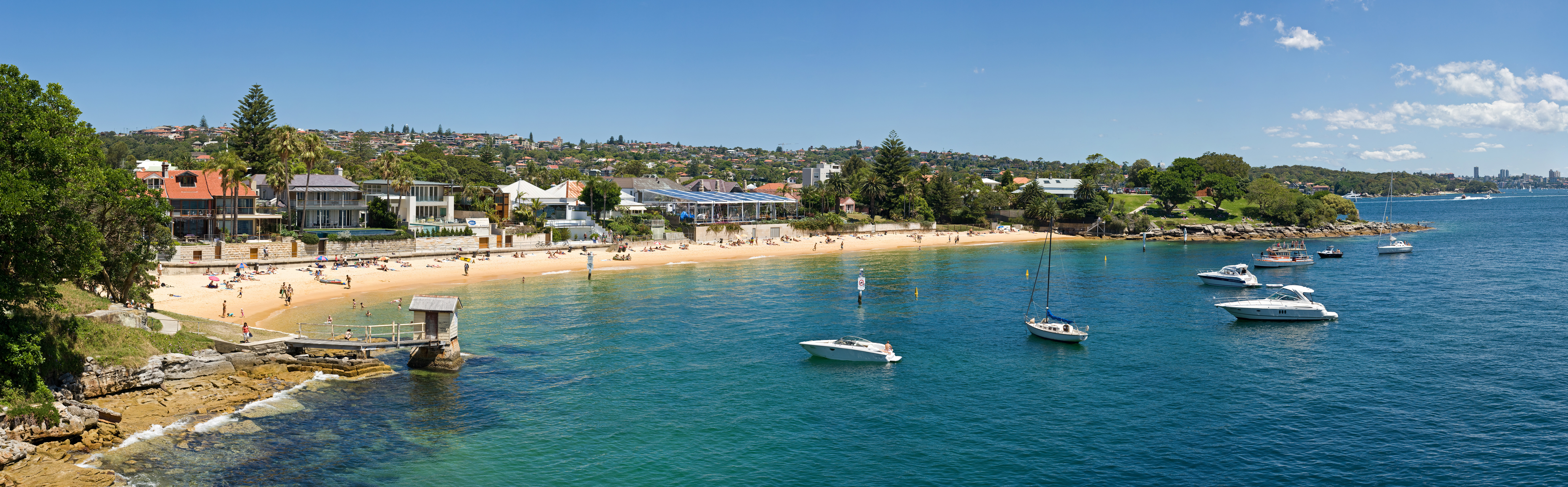
Camp Cove, Watsons Bay

Watsons Bay is a mostly residential area with some recreational areas and beaches, including Camp Cove and a legal nude beach located at Lady Bay. Some restaurants, cafes and a hotel are located here. The coastal walk with ocean views of the Gap along South Head make Watsons Bay a popular tourist attraction in Sydney. The Sydney Harbour Pilot Boat Station was located on the bay, and the naval training base HMAS Watson is located nearby at South Head.

== Heritage listings ==
Watsons Bay has a number of heritage-listed sites, including:

- Dunbar, a ship
- Old South Head Road: Hornby Lighthouse

Watsons Bay has a large number of heritage buildings, with the following buildings listed on the (now defunct) Register of the National Estate: Many buildings and structures are also listed as heritage items by Woollahra Council.

- Buildings 28–31, HMAS Watson
- Hornby Lighthouse and two cottages, South Head
- St Peter's Church, Old South Head Road, designed by Edmund Blacket (1864)
- Our Lady Star of the Sea Church, Old South Head Road (1909–1910)
- Scout hall, 335 Old South Head Road, former school designed by George Allen Mansfield (1876)
- A former school residence designed by George Allen Mansfield, Old South Head Road, (1876)
- Former marine station, Pacific Street and Laings Point, built and used by Nicholas Miklouho-Maclay (1885)
- Sandstone obelisk, Robertson Park, commemorating the construction of Old South Head Road (1811)
- Boongarre, Pacific Street, has a local government heritage listing
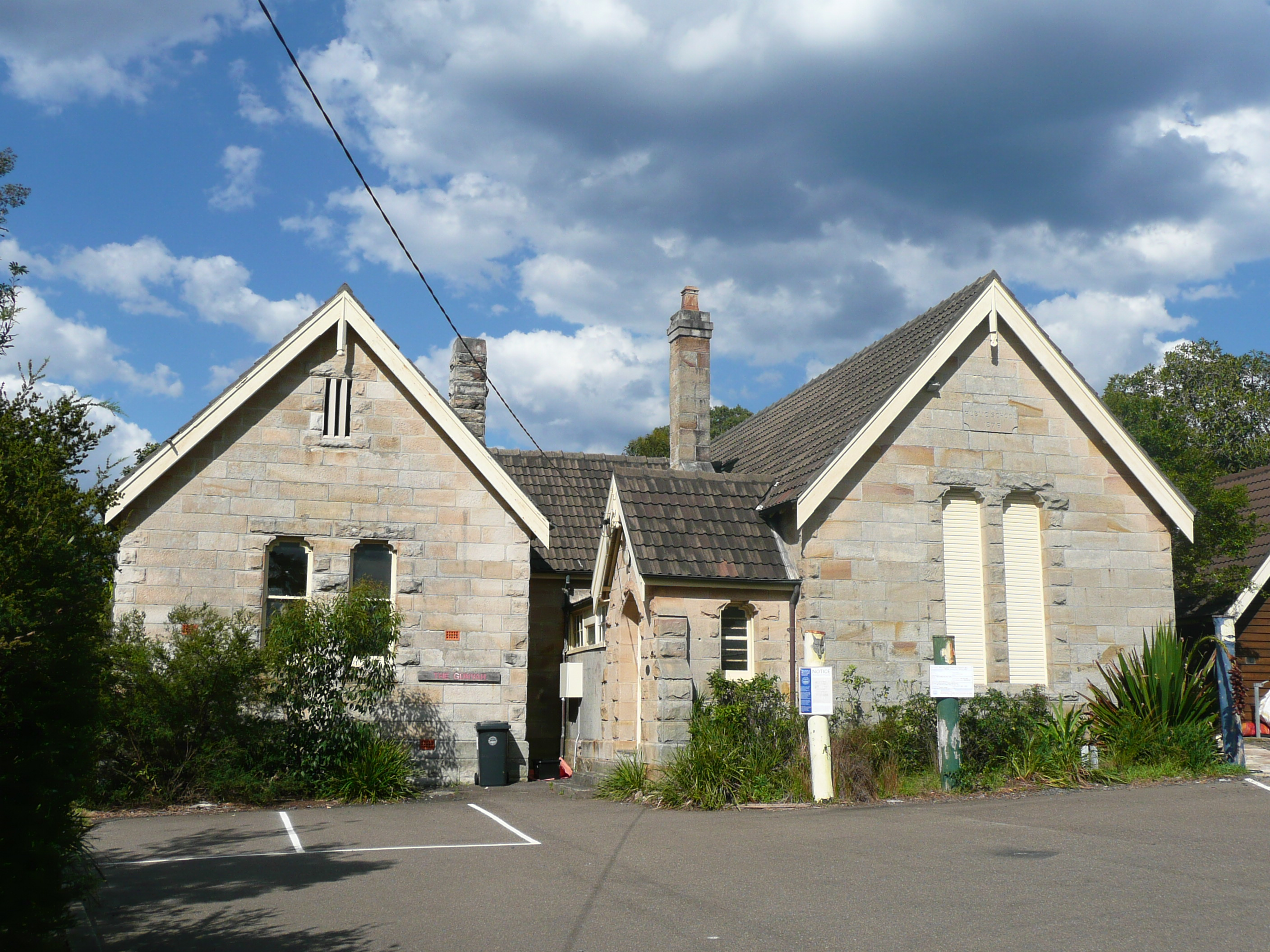
Former school, Old South Head Road (1876)

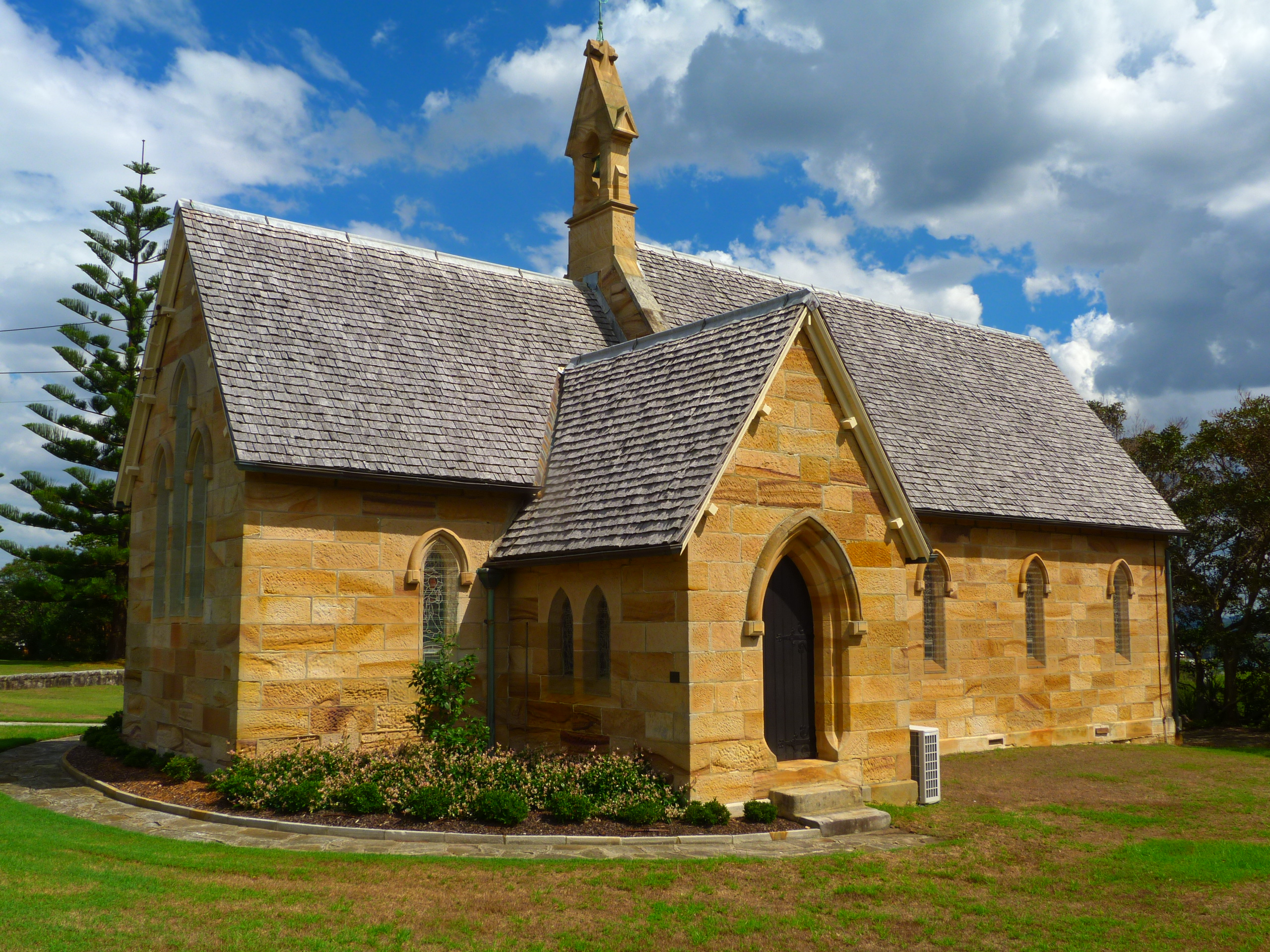
St Peter's Anglican Church (1864)

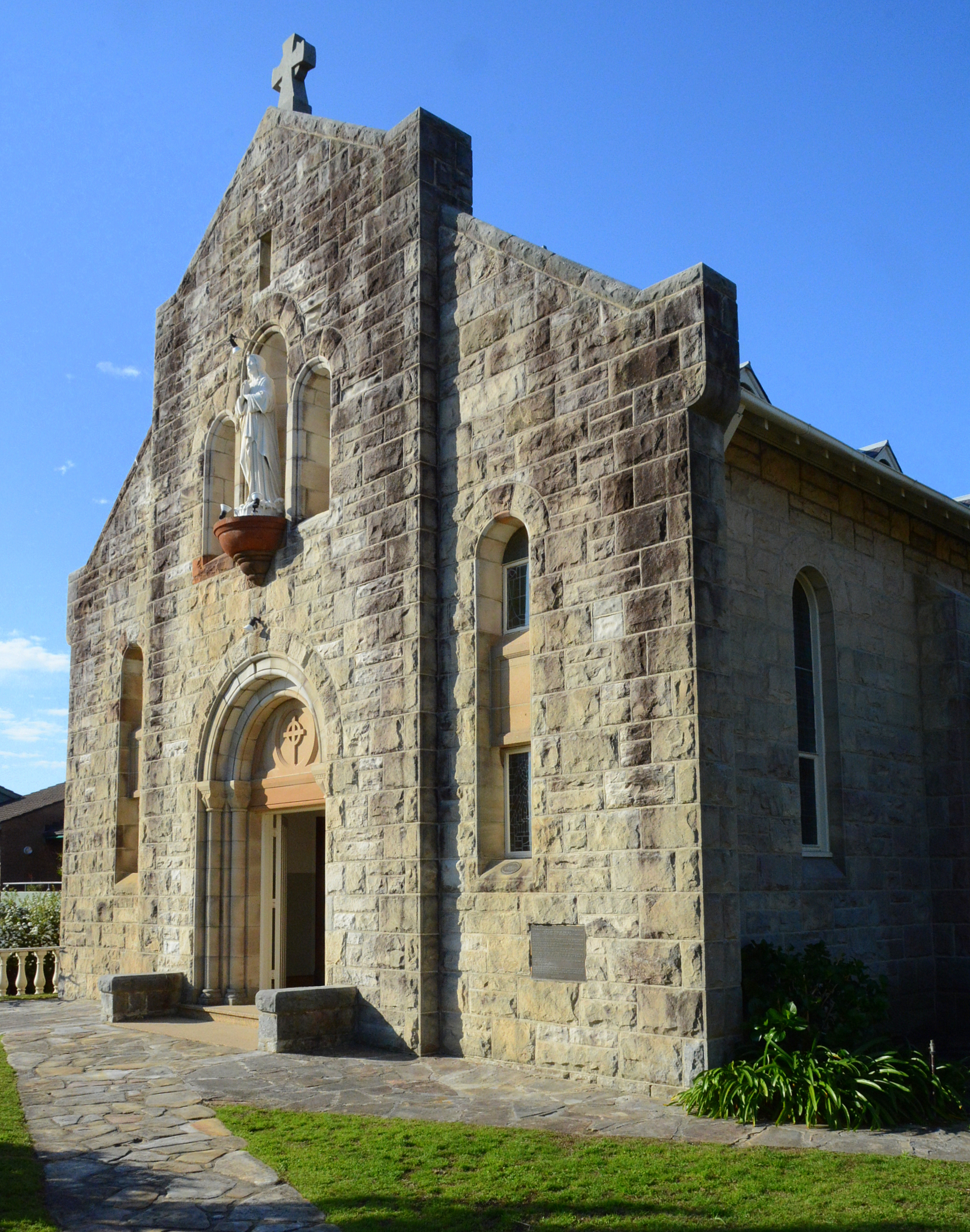
Our Lady Star of the Sea Catholic Church

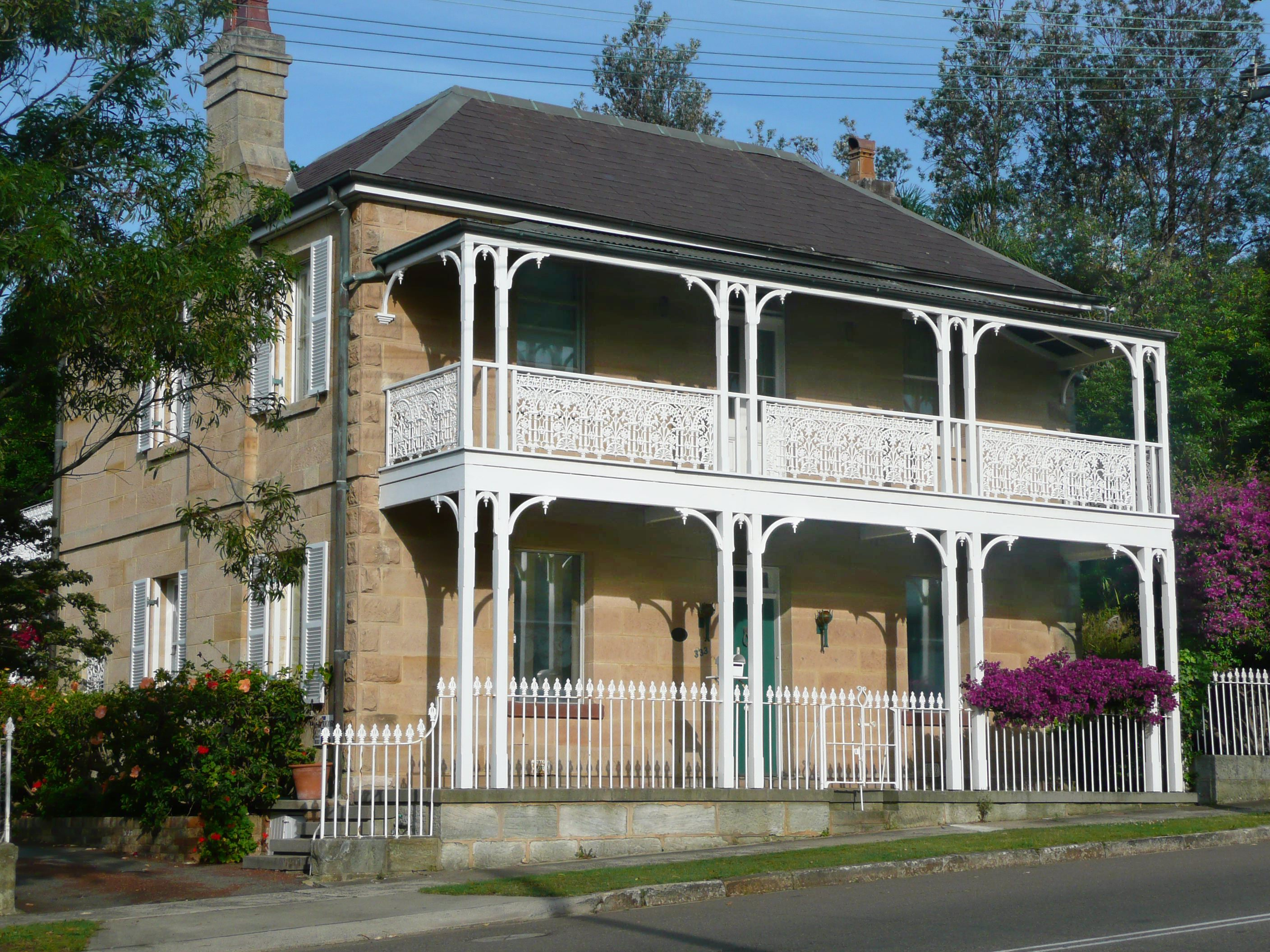
Former school residence, Old South Head Road (1876)

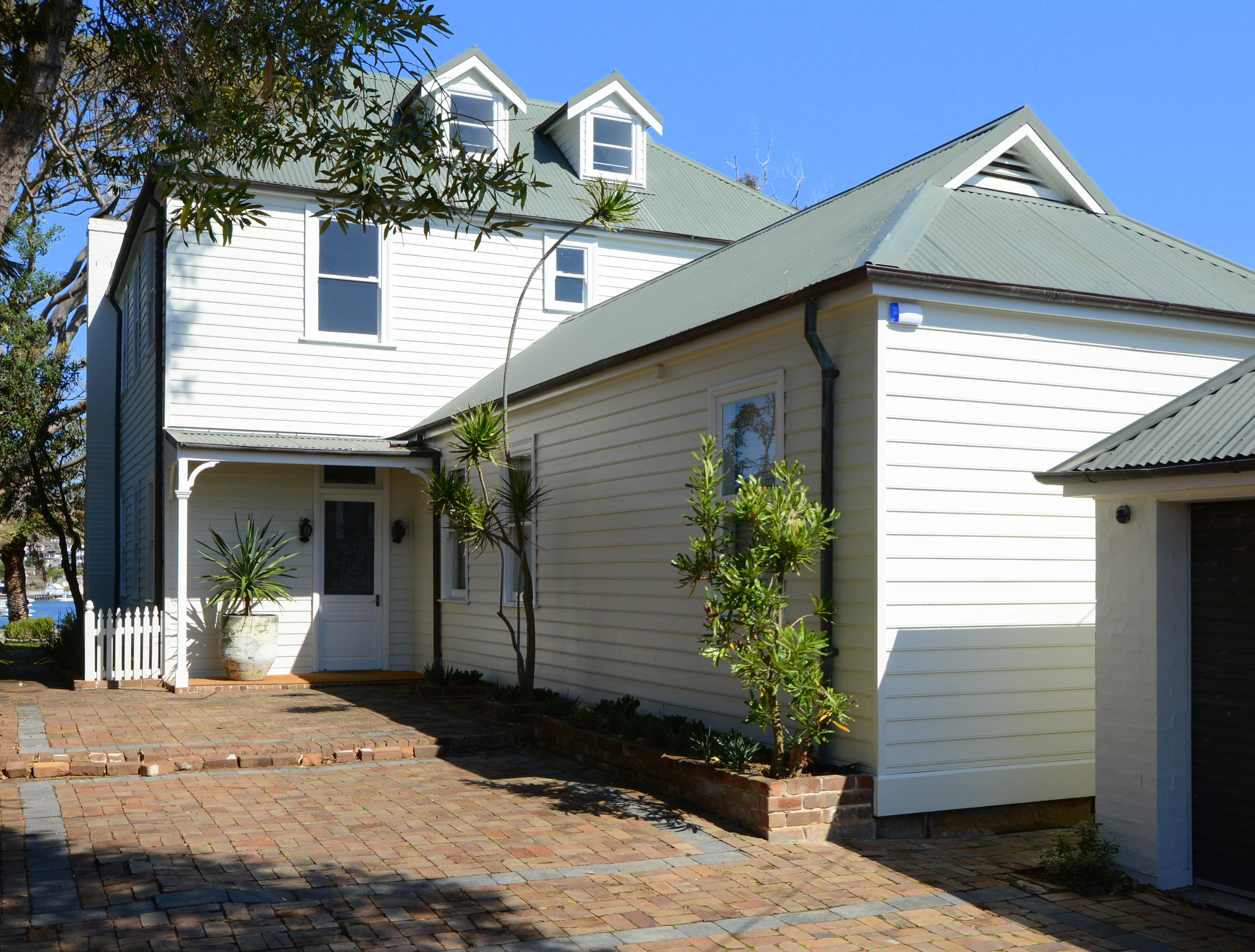
Former home of Christina Stead, Pacific Street

=== Events ===
Every Man and His Dog is an annual event held in Watsons Bay on Australia Day (January 26), where men and their dogs team up on the same stand-up paddle board and race other dog lovers. Many of the participants dress up in matching dog and owner costumes.

=== Attractions ===
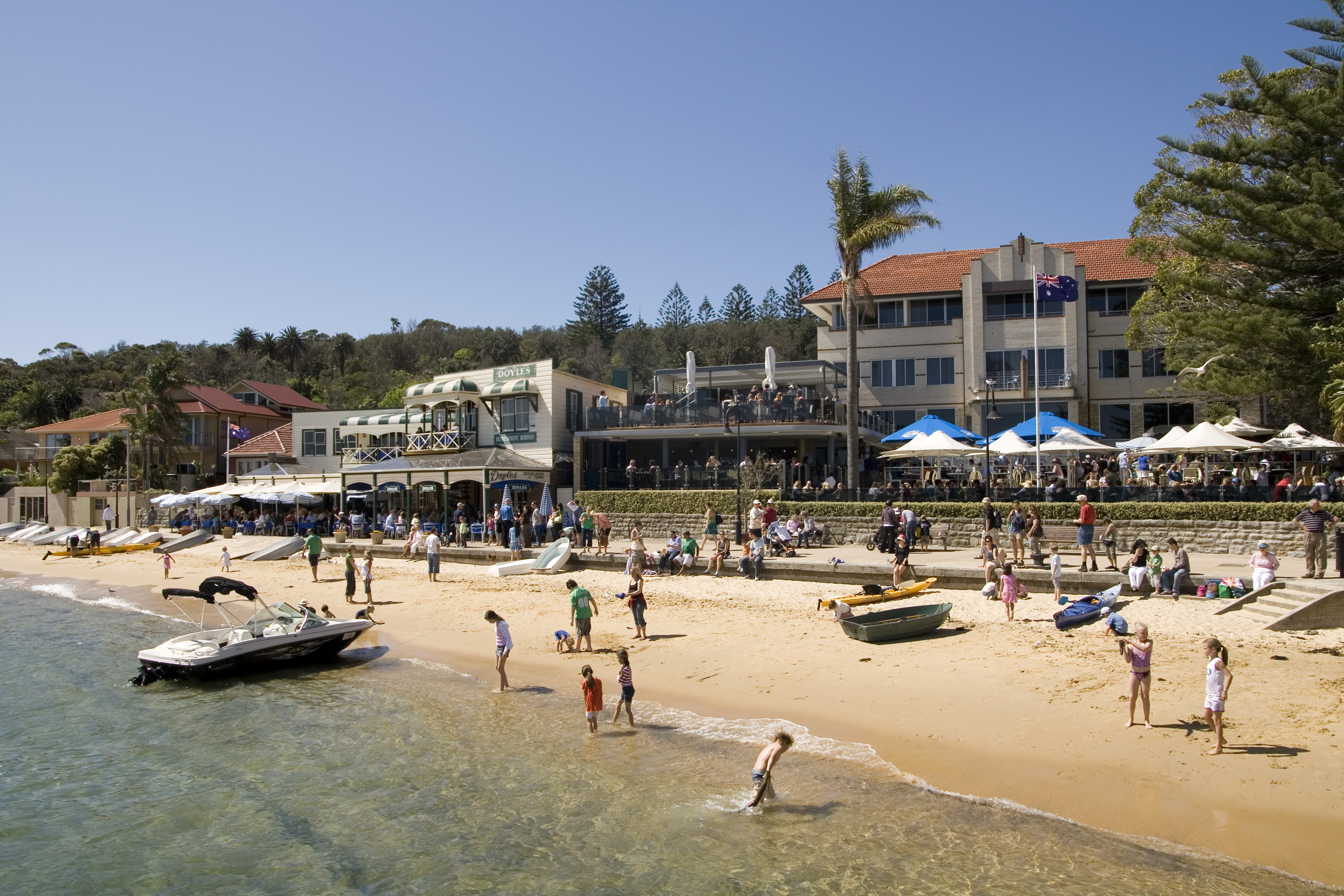
Watsons Bay, NSW

- Bottle and Glass Point
- Doyles on the Beach
- Hermitage Foreshore Track
- Macquarie Lighthouse
- Milk Beach Vaucluse
- Nielson Park
- The Federation Cliff Walk
- Shakespeares Point
- Vaucluse House

== Notable people ==
Notable people from or who have lived in Watsons Bay include:

- Herbert Badham (1899–1961), an Australian realist painter
