= Herbert Badham =

Australian realist painter and art teacher

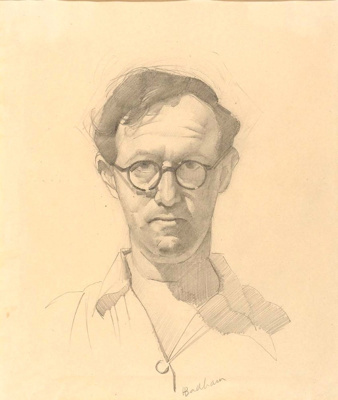
- Self portrait sketch
- Born: 1899; Watsons Bay, New South Wales, Australia
- Died: 24 September 1961 (aged 61–62); Zetland, New South Wales, Australia
- Education: Julian Ashton Art School
- Occupations: Painter; art teacher
- Spouse: Enid Wilson
- Children: 1 daughter

Herbert Edward Badham (1899–1961) was an Australian realist painter and art teacher.

== Biography ==
=== Early life ===
Herbert Badham was born in 1899 in Watsons Bay, a suburb of Sydney, Australia to Herbert Lewis Badham (c. 1870 – 1937) and his wife Mary. He was one of five children in the family. He enlisted in the Australian Royal Navy in 1917 to serve in World War I. From 1925 to 1938, he studied painting at the Julian Ashton Art School, where he was tutored by Julian Ashton, George Washington Lambert and Henry Gibbons.

=== Career ===
He was a realist painter, and focused on painting scenes of everyday life. "People in crowds, in the streets, in pubs, waiting, playing, watching others, travelling to and from work." His work was exhibited at the Society of Artists from 1927 to his death. Later, in 1939, his first solo exhibition took place at the Grosvenor Gallery, Sydney. A review of the exhibition described a collection of portraits in pencil and a series of oils. Of particular note, the work Travellers was described as "bustling plebian." In a similar vein, another review praised Badham's ability to paint "aspects of Sydney life which few painters have the courage to tackle."

Badham taught painting at the East Sydney Technical College from 1938 to 1961. He published two books about Australian art, A Study of Australian Art, 1949, and A Gallery of Australian Art, 1954.

By April 1950 he was living at Darling Point Road, Darling Point. He married dressmaker Enid Wilson in Sydney in 1927. Their daughter, Chebi Badham, became an artist and animator.

Currently, two of his paintings are exhibited at the Art Gallery of New South Wales in Sydney. Another painting is found at the Art Gallery of Ballarat in Ballarat. Another painting is exhibited at the Canadian War Museum in Ottawa.

=== Death ===
He died on 24 September 1961. His obituary reported Badham died in Royal South Sydney Hospital on Sunday, aged 62. "Mr Badham, of Macleay Street Potts Point, was head teacher at the National Art School, East Sydney.

== Works ==
Paintings by Badham include:

- Self-portrait (early 1920s).
- Travellers (1933).
- Breakfast piece (1936).
- The fairground, Sydney (1944).
- The vegetable shop (1950).
- Domesticity (1959).

== Gallery holdings ==
National, State, and regional galleries across Australia holds works by Herbert Badham.

- The National Gallery of Australia holds two works including The ferry 1943.
- The Art Gallery of N.S.W. holds two works including Self portrait, (early 1920s)
- The State Library of N.S.W. holds nine works including Hazy morning 1944.
- The National Gallery of Victoria holds two works including The night bus 1943.
- The National Portrait Gallery hold Self portrait with glove 1939.
- The New England Regional Art Museum hold Hyde Park 1933.
- The Australian War Memorial hold The fair ground, Sydney 1944.

== Bibliography ==
- Herbert Badham (1949), A Study of Australian Art (Sydney: Currawong Press).
- Herbert Badham (ed.) (1954), A Gallery of Australian Art (Sydney: Currawong Press).
