= Park Street, Sydney =

Street in Sydney, Australia

Park Street, Sydney New South Wales
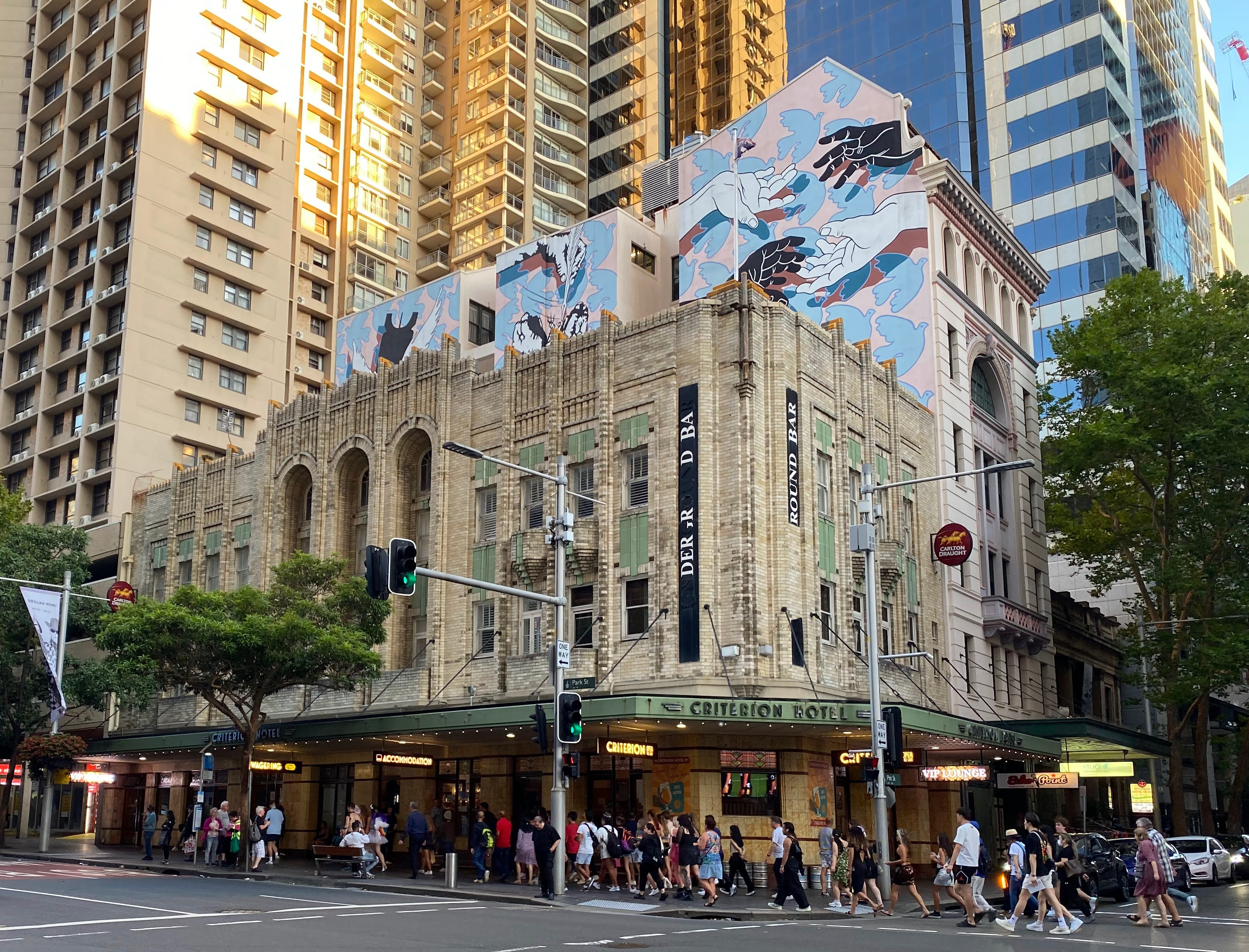
- Criterion Hotel, Park Street
- Coordinates: 33.872969°S 151.207046°E (Western end); 33.873682°S 151.212594°E (Eastern end)

General information
- Type: Street
- Length: 500 m (0.3 mi)

Major junctions
- Western end: Druitt Street; Sydney CBD
- George Street; Pitt Street; Castlereagh Street; Elizabeth Street; College Street
- Eastern end: William Street; Sydney CBD

Location(s)
- LGA(s): City of Sydney
- Major suburbs: Sydney CBD

Park Street is a street in the central business district of Sydney in New South Wales, Australia. It runs from George Street in the west to College Street in the east, where it becomes William Street.

== Description ==
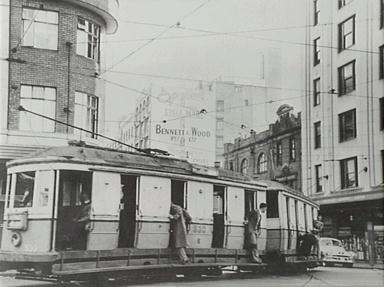
Tram on the corner of Pitt and Park Streets, 1950

Park Street bisects Hyde Park, (Note: Hyde park, the oldest in Australia, was created in 1810 by Governor Macquarie and has a state heritage listing.) hence its name. Publishing and Broadcasting Limited and its successor, Consolidated Media Holdings, had their corporate headquarters at 54 Park Street.

An electric tramway once ran down Park Street between Elizabeth and College Streets. It was removed in 1960.

== Improvements ==
In 1988, the Urban Design Unit of the NSW Department of Planning suggested if a tunnel was completed, north and south Hyde Park could be joined with a pedestrianised space.

== See also ==
- Cross City Tunnel
