= Robert Watson (harbourmaster) =

British sailor

Robert Watson (c. 1756–November 1, 1819) was a British sailor who arrived in Australia with the First Fleet as quartermaster of the ship Sirius.

Robert Watson was born in Northumberland.

In 1801 Watson was granted land at South Head in Sydney Harbour, in what is now known as Watsons Bay. In 1929, a seat to commemorate Watson was erected in Robertson Park with an inaccurate inscription, reading "To commemorate Robert Watson after whom this Bay is named Quartermaster of H.M.S. Sirius 1786-1790 Signal-Man South Head 1791-1811 Pilot and Harbour Master 1811-1816 Superintendent of Macquarie Lighthouse 1818 Died 1st November 1819".

There is no record of Watson's wife, but while in Sydney, Watson had two sons and a daughter with her. Watson requested leave due to an illness in October 1819, and died on November 1, 1819, at his home. He was buried in the Sandhills Cemetery, but his remains were later moved to La Perouse in 1901.
