= Object: Australian Design Centre =

Non-profit organisation promoting contemporary design

Object: Australian Design Centre is a non-profit organisation for the promotion of contemporary design. The organisation previously occupied office and gallery space on the redeveloped St. Margaret's Hospital site at Surry Hills, Sydney and is now located in William House, in Darlinghurst, New South Wales. It is a member of the peak organisation, Australian Craft and Design Centres (ACDC), which represents the professional design and craft sector in all states and territories in Australia.

== History ==
The organisation was established in 1964 as Australia's first Craft Association with architect Neville Gruzman as the first Board President. It took on the name Crafts Council of NSW soon afterwards. From 1995 to 2000 the organisation was known as the Centre for Contemporary Craft. The name ‘Object’ was introduced in 1998 and in 2000 it was officially renamed Object: Australian Centre for Craft and Design. In 2015, the organisation changed its name from Object to Australian Design Centre.

Since its inception the organisation has placed significant focus on exhibition and retail galleries, and from 1981 occupied the Mariners' Church, an historic building at the Rocks, Sydney. During the 1990s, a period of rapid growth for the organisation, Object's core business expanded to include the Object Magazine, Object Gallery and highly regarded retail outlets located in the Rocks and in Circular Quay, Sydney. In 1996, under the name Centre for Contemporary Craft, the organisation joined the City West Development Corporation and the Federal Government of Employment Education and Youth Affairs in redeveloping five derelict terraces houses in Pyrmont. The refurbishment of the properties was intended to provide a craft precinct of six studios, a communal workshop, office, shop and meeting room. The initiative was funded as a Business Incubator for three years by the Federal Government.

At the same time the organisation was negotiating for space within the soon-to-be redeveloped Customs House at Circular Quay, hoping to expand Object's exhibition space and retail outlet. The move to Customs house was supported by Australia Council, the NSW Ministry for Arts and the City of Sydney with an offer of subsidised rent.

Since 2000 Object has become more focused on human-centred design to examine social issues related to health, education, and the environment. It committed itself to working with designers such as F!nk, Marc Newson, Koskela, architects and urban designers as well as community audiences to explore the potential of design in Australian modern life.

Object currently occupies the St Margaret's Chapel building in Surry Hills, originally designed by Ken Woolley in 1958. The 16 metre diameter building is an early example of Woolley's architecture when he worked for the NSW Government Architect's Office. The curved and elevated chapel is constructed of precast concrete with steel windows and was originally linked to the Sisters' Home by way of a walkway. In 2004 Sam Marshall Architects adapted the interior as a contemporary exhibition space for artists and designers.

== Object Magazine ==
The first issue of Object Magazine was published in 1992 and evolved from the Crafts NSW Newsletter originally circulated in 1967. The organisation continued to produce 59 issues of Object Magazine in a printed format until 2009.

In 2011 Object: Australian Design Centre released Issue 60 in a digital version as an iPad app. Since then Issues 61, 62 and 63 have all been released electronically and have been nominated for Pixel Awards, Mapda Awards, Webby Awards, and Aimia awards. Issue 63 won the People's Champ Pixel Award in the Magazines category, was recognised by Favourite Website Awards (FWA) as Mobile of the Day for February 12, 2013. It was designated an Official Honoree in the Mobile & Apps Best Visual Design category of the 2013 Webby Awards.

== Key historical exhibitions ==
Major shows in the Object Gallery which focused on increasing the profile of Australian Designers include:

- Dinosaur Designs Retrospective (2001, 2002, 2007)
- Akira Isogawa (2001)
- Living Treasures program (launched 2005)
- Menagerie: Contemporary Indigenous Sculpture (2009)
- Hyperclay: Contemporary Ceramics (2011)

== Education ==
The Australian Design Centre's flagship education program is Design Emergency which takes 'design thinking' to students in K-12 classrooms using online resources and live workshops facilitated by a designer. Students work collaboratively with a designer and explore design-led problem solving methodology using an example from their own lives.

== Management ==
The organisation receives funding from State Government, through Arts NSW and the Federal Government through the Australia Council. They are also assisted by the Visual Arts and Crafts Strategy, an initiative of the Australian State and Territory Governments. As a not-for-profit organisation Object:Australian Design Centre relies on contributions from individual donors, private sector companies and a number of philanthropic trusts and foundations.

The Board of Directors include representatives from finance, government, education, legal and arts sectors including KPMG, Deloitte Australia, NSW Government Architect’s Office, UTS, SCA and COFA.

== The Future ==
In April 2013 Lend Lease announced that it had signed a Memorandum of Understanding with Object: Australian Design Centre to develop a permanent home for the organisation in Barangaroo's $6 billion Sydney harbourfront project.

Object 2015: Australian Design Centre statement for the future includes consolidating its position as ’a visible leader to resource and encourage people to transform complex problems through design’. This represents a fundamental shift in the organisation from curating and hosting design-focused artists and craftspeople to one that actively engages with the process of technological, digital and sustainable design. Object continues to showcase modern designers across a range of fields.

In 2023 the Australian Design Centre introduced the MAKE Award: a biennial prize for innovation in Australian Craft and Design. The winner of the MAKE Award receives a cash prize of $35,000 with a second prize of $10,000. In 2023 the finalists entries were exhibited at the Australian Design Centre at William Street, Darlinghurst NSW, and then exhibited at the JAM Factory in South Australia, and Geelong Art Gallery in Victoria in 2024.

The Australian Design Centre also produces ‘Object: stories of design and craft’ podcast, which features interviews with artists, curators and designers from around Australia, and was a finalist for the Australian Podcast Awards in 2022 and 2023.
