= William House (building) =

General information
- Architectural style: Inter-War Commercial; Inter-War Chicagoesque
- Address: 101–115 William Street
- Town or city: Darlinghurst, New South Wales
- Country: Australia
- Coordinates: 33.87462°S 151.21680°E
- Completed: 1928

Design and construction
- Architect(s): Percy Gordon Craig

William House is a mixed residential and commercial heritage building, located on William Street in Darlinghurst, New South Wales.

The property is located on the former site of George Farm, a 70-acre (28 ha) grant made to John Palmer in 1794. William House was designed by architect Percy Gordon Craig, and constructed circa 1928, following the demolition of existing buildings on the southern side of William Street for road widening. The first major tenant was a branch of Cheney's Australia, a company founded by Sydney Albert Cheney, seller of Austin and Morris cars and an associate of William Morris, 1st Viscount Nuffield. In 1927, Morris established Morris (NSW) Pty Ltd to coordinate the sale of Morris cars in Australia; and by 1930 the company had become the principle tenant in William House. Yorks Motors was set up in Williams House as the sole New South Wales distributor of Plymouth and Chrysler cars in 1932.

A public artwork, entitled Gadigal Mural, reaches over 25 metres (82 ft) long and 17 metres (56 ft) high across the back of William House on Barnett Lane. The mural was initiated by the Australian Design Centre, designed by Sydney artist Jason Wing, and produced in consultation with the Metropolitan Local Aboriginal Land Council.
