= Kings Cross Tunnel =

Road tunnel in Sydney, Australia

Overview
- Location: Kings Cross, Sydney, Australia
- Start: William Street
- End: New South Head Road

Operation
- Opened: 15 December 1975
- Owner: Transport for NSW
- Traffic: Automotive

Technical
- Length: 274 m (899 ft)
- No. of lanes: 4
- Operating speed: 60 km/h (37 mph)

The Kings Cross Tunnel is a twin-tube road tunnel in Sydney, Australia. It runs beneath Kings Cross from William Street to New South Head Road. It was built in conjunction with the Eastern Suburbs railway line that has a tunnel immediately below the road tunnel at its eastern end.

Work commenced in 1970. Two bridges were constructed at Victoria Street and Ward Avenue forming the portals. A foot bridge was built near the eastern approach. Built using the cut and cover method, it was opened on 15 December 1975 by Premier Tom Lewis. The air rights were sold in the 1980s and developed as apartments by Walker Corporation.
