= New South Head Road =

Road in Sydney, Australia

New South Head Road New South Wales
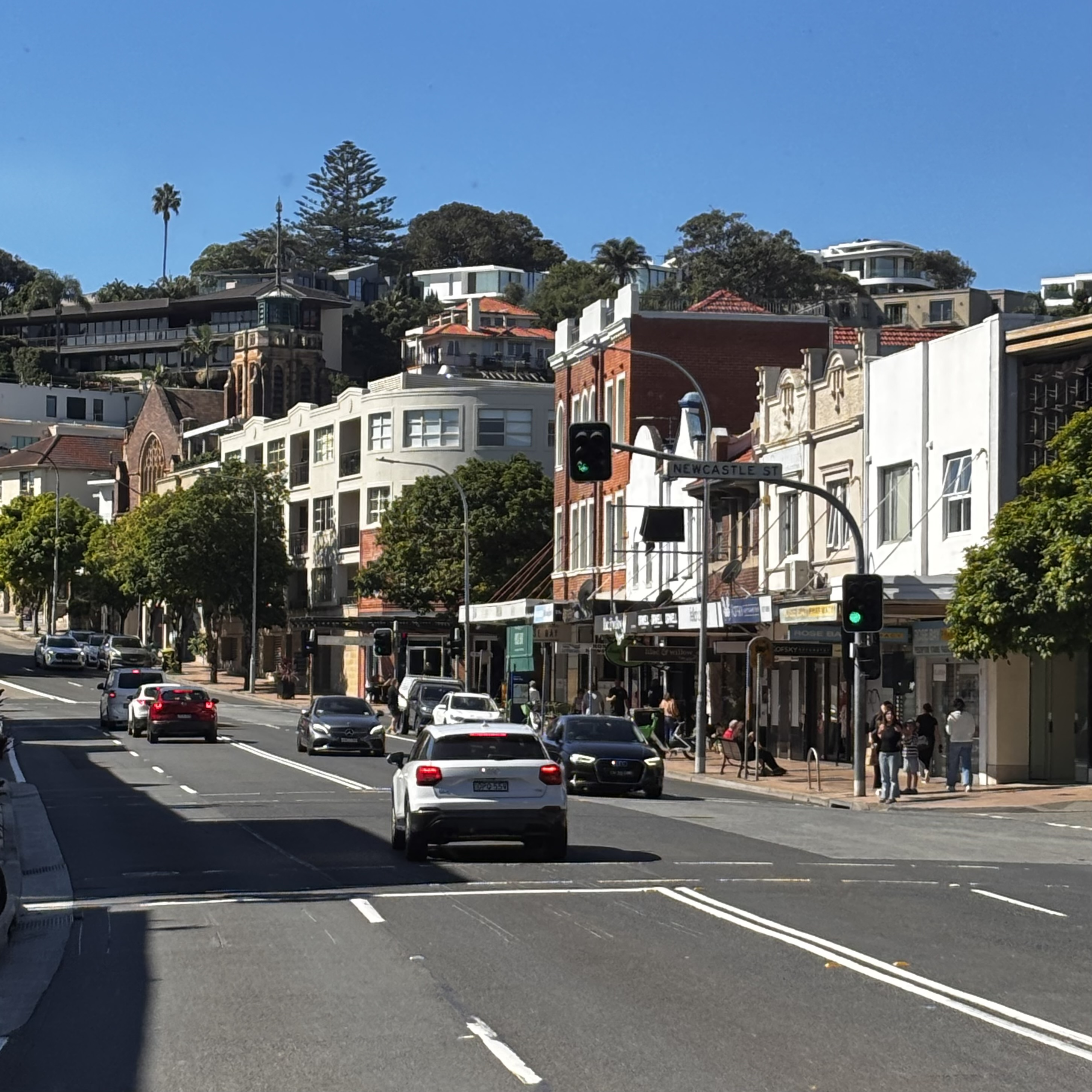
- New South Head Road, Rose Bay
- Coordinates: 33.876717°S 151.227279°E (Southwest end); 33.857067°S 151.282570°E (Northeast end)

General information
- Type: Road
- Length: 7.0 km (4.3 mi)
- Gazetted: August 1928
- Former route number: State Route 76 (1976–2004)

Major junctions
- Southwest end: William Street; Bayswater Road; Rushcutters Bay, Sydney
- Ocean Street; Hopetoun Avenue
- Northeast end: Old South Head Road; Vaucluse, Sydney

Location(s)
- Major suburbs: Edgecliff, Double Bay, Point Piper, Rose Bay

New South Head Road (NSHR) is a major road in the Eastern Suburbs of Sydney, linking the inner-eastern suburb of Rushcutters Bay to the southern reaches of the South Head peninsula.

== Route ==
New South Head Road commences from the intersection with Bayswater Road (eastbound)/William Street (westbound) and heads in a north-easterly direction as a six-lane dual-carriageway road from Rushcutters Bay through Edgecliff, before narrowing down to a four-lane, single carriageway road through Double Bay, Point Piper and Rose Bay where it eventually terminates at the intersection with Old South Head Road at Vaucluse.

== History ==
=== Maroo track ===
Prior to the road's construction the main route to the southern headland was South Head Road, which led to the signal station following the route of modern-day Old South Head Road and Oxford Street. In 1831, construction began on New South Head Road. The road was to follow the route of the Aboriginal foot track Maroo, which contoured between south head and Sydney. Before construction began on New South Head Road, only Aboriginal people, and those stationed at the South Head Lookout Post used the track.

=== Initial completion ===
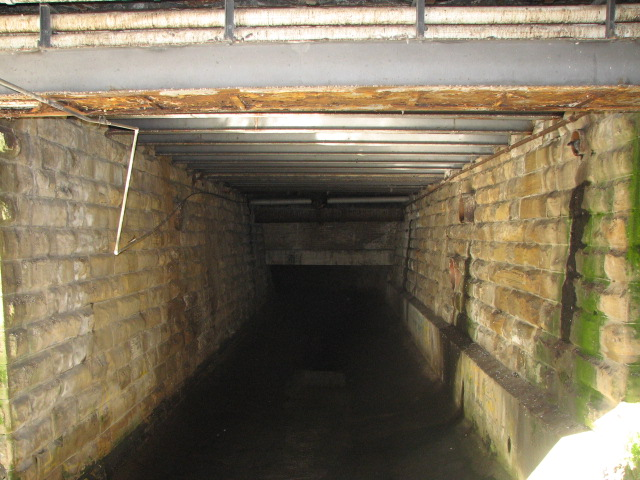
The Remains of Bentley's Bridge today

For the first few years of construction progress was slow and only parts of the road began to develop, as work was treacherous with the route offering a range of harsh environments such as the low lying swamplands of Rushcutters Bay, Double Bay and Rose Bay, to the steep cliff faces of Vaucluse and Watsons Bay; in addition, the bush lands surrounding the Maroo Track were reportedly infested with snakes. However, by 1834 efforts had increased, and the road began to take shape. Where the road crosses Rushcutters Creek, a succession of bridges were built, starting with a timber bridge around 1834, followed by a stone bridge erected between 1837 and 1839. Bentley's Bridge, as it came to be known, was built by convicts under supervision of Lieutenant ACD Bentley. By the late 1830s, the road was able to cater for carts and stretched from Rushcutters Bay to Vaucluse, finally providing Sydneysiders a coastal thoroughfare along the southern banks of the harbour.

=== South Head Road's Trust ===
Due to the poor condition of the New South Head Road and its southern predecessor Old South Head Road a trust was set up by a government act in May 1848. The trust had the responsibility of maintaining the twenty four kilometres of road under its control. To raise the funds to maintain the roads the Trust set up tolls, one of which was located on New South Head Road in the form of a turnpike gate that extracted tolls from the road users. Unfortunately for the occupants of newly developed suburbs on South Head such as Vaucluse, the trust failed to adequately delegate funds and maintenance of the road remained poor until the trust was disbanded in 1904.

=== Growing importance ===
After the completion of New South Head Road, suburbs quickly formed around the road creating a demand for public and private services. In the late nineteenth century a number of schools were established on the road including the Sacred Heart Convent, now Kincoppal School (1882), Kambala School (1884), Ascham School (1886) and Cranbrook School established twenty years later in Rose Bay. As well as this a Roman Catholic church, St. Mary Magdalene, was built in Rose Bay in 1920. Official Government buildings were also established on the road including the Rose Bay Police Station (1930) and the Woollahra Council Chambers in Double Bay (1947). Also a number of recreational facilities were installed along the route including parks, yacht clubs and the Royal Sydney Golf Club (1896).

=== Expansion ===
By the early 1930s New South Head Road had become a major route as it linked the wealthy suburbs on the harbour foreshore to Sydney's centre. The road had developed little since its initial completion and its condition had severely worsened since the disbanding of the Old South Head Road's Trust in 1904, so in 1932 a major redevelopment of the road began which included widening the road to cater for modern day motor vehicles. The widening of the road required the creation of seawalls in Rose Bay and Rushcutters Bay, whilst the Rose Bay sea wall had been mainly developed in 1928, the Rushcutters Bay sea wall wasn't completed until later in 1932. The road was again widened in the late 1970s and early 1980s to four lanes (two each way).

=== Trams ===
In the late nineteenth century a tram line was added to New South Head Road. The Watson's Bay line began at Wynyard and reached New South Head Road at its starting point in Rushcutters Bay, where a tram depot serving the line was located on the north side of the road. The line was expanded along New South Head Road to Edgecliff in 1894 and reached Watsons Bay in 1909. The line left New South Head Road in Vaucluse as it became a single track down to Watson's Bay. The track was centralized in the late 1920s and early 1930s with the widening of New South Head Road. In 1949, the line from Rose Bay to Watson's Bay was closed, but reopened due to public protest in 1950, though was later along with the rest of the line permanently closed in 1960.

=== Present day ===
Today the road serves as a major link to the city from the predominantly upper and middle class suburbs of the Woollahra municipality. The road is often heavily congested with cars especially during peak hours. The road is serviced by a number of bus routes connecting the Sydney CBD to Vaucluse, Watsons Bay and Dover Heights. There is a major bus interchange and railway station located on the road at Edgecliff. The Watsons Bay ferry service has stops off the road in Rose Bay and Double Bay, providing a popular and quicker option for businesspersons in the area to commute to the city. The road also serves as the major leg of the Sydney City to Surf running event, and is famous for the steep ascent from Rose Bay to Vaucluse known as Heartbreak Hill.

=== Road classification ===
The passing of the Main Roads Act of 1924 through the Parliament of New South Wales provided for the declaration of Main Roads, roads partially funded by the State government through the Main Roads Board. Main Road No. 173 was declared along this road on 8 August 1928, from Rushcutters Bay, via Rose Bay to the intersection with Hopetoun Avenue in Vaucluse (and continuing north along Hopetoun Avenue to the intersection with Old South Head Road in Watsons Bay); with the passing of the Main Roads (Amendment) Act of 1929 to provide for additional declarations of State Highways and Trunk Roads, this was amended to Main Road 173 on 8 April 1929.

The north-eastern end of Main Road 173 was re-aligned from Hopetoun Avenue to run along the complete length of New South Head Road and terminate with Old South Head Road at Vaucluse on 22 January 1993.

The passing of the Roads Act of 1993 updated road classifications and the way they could be declared within New South Wales. Under this act, New South Head Road retains its declaration as part of Main Road 173.

The route was allocated State Route 76, just after the opening of the Kings Cross Tunnel, in 1976, along New South Head Road and Hopetoun Avenue; the north-eastern end was re-aligned in 1993 to run along the complete length of New South Head Road and end in Vaucluse. It was completely decommissioned in 2004.

== Major intersections ==
LGA	Location	km	mi	Destinations	Notes
Sydney	Rushcutters Bay–Darlinghurst boundary	0.0	0.0	William Street (one-way westbound) – Woolloomooloo	Southwestern terminus of road
Sydney	Rushcutters Bay–Darlinghurst boundary	0.0	0.0	Barcom Avenue (one-way southbound) – Darlinghurst	
Sydney	Rushcutters Bay–Darlinghurst boundary	0.2	0.12	MacLachlan Avenue (one-way northbound) – Darlinghurst	
Sydney–Woollahra boundary	Rushcutters Bay–Darling Point–Edgecliff tripoint	0.3	0.19	Neild Avenue (one-way southbound) – Darlinghurst	
Woollahra	Edgecliff	1.0	0.62	Ocean Avenue (north) – Double Bay; Ocean Street (south) – Woollahra	
Woollahra	Double Bay–Bellevue Hill boundary	2.4	1.5	Victoria Road – Bondi Junction	
Woollahra	Rose Bay	3.7	2.3	O'Sullivan Road – Bondi Beach	
Woollahra	Rose Bay–Vaucluse boundary	5.5	3.4	Vaucluse Road – Vaucluse	
Woollahra	Vaucluse	6.1	3.8	Hopetoun Avenue – Watsons Bay	
Woollahra	Vaucluse	7.0	4.3	Old South Head Road – Watsons Bay, Bondi Beach	Northeastern terminus of road at roundabout
Incomplete access; Route transition
