= Rushcutters Bay =

- Suburb
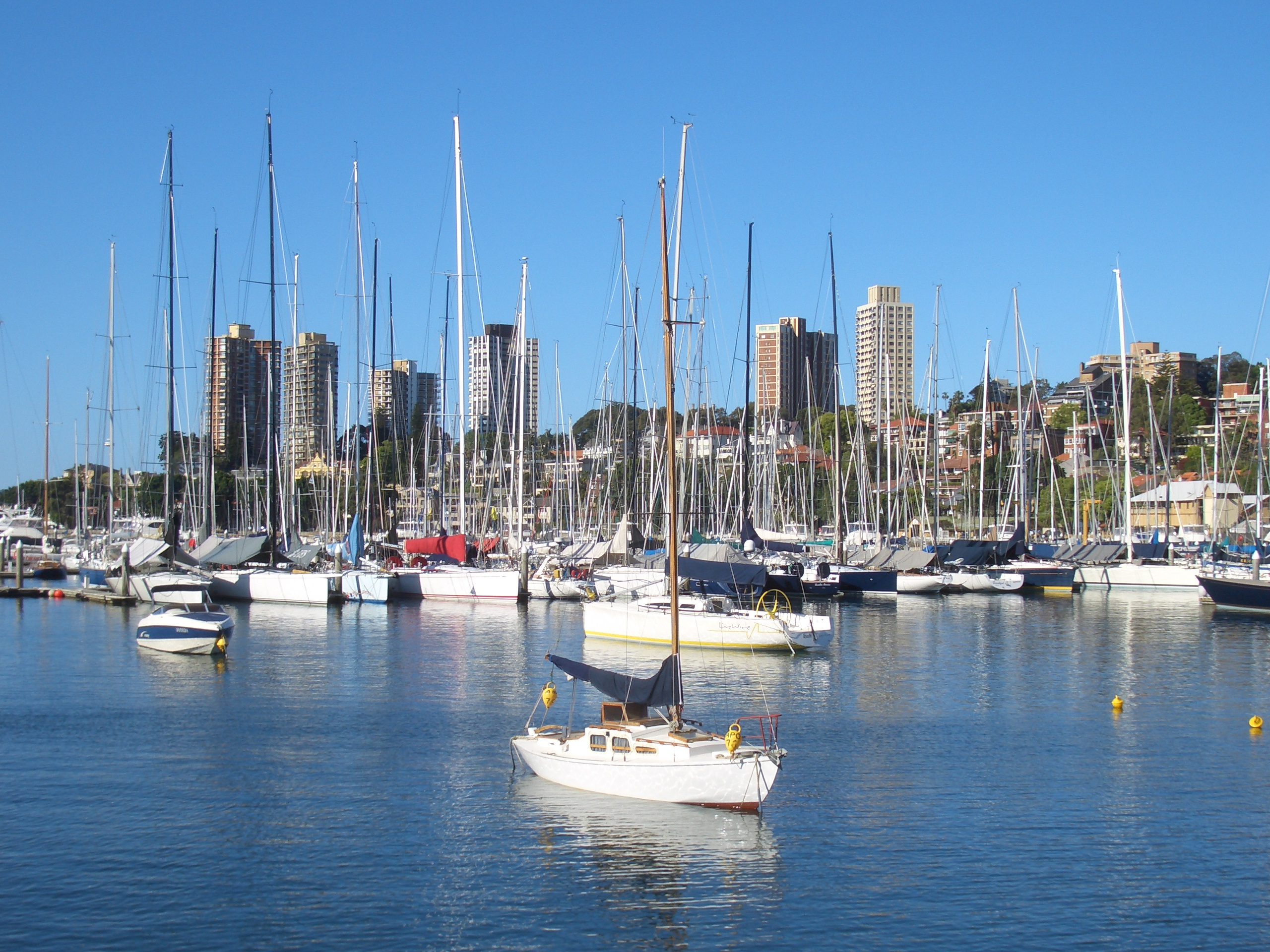
- Rushcutters Bay

- Interactive map of Rushcutters Bay
- Country: Australia
- State: New South Wales
- City: Sydney
- LGA: City of Sydney
- Location: 3 km (1.9 mi) east of Sydney CBD

Government
  - State electorates: Sydney; Vaucluse
  - Federal division: Wentworth

Area
  - Total: 0.16 km^{2} (0.062 sq mi)
- Elevation: 28 m (92 ft)

Population
  - Total: 2,335 (SAL 2021)
  - Density: 14,594/km^{2} (37,800/sq mi)
- Postcode: 2011
Suburbs around Rushcutters Bay
Potts Point	Elizabeth Bay	Port Jackson
Potts Point	Rushcutters Bay	Darling Point
Darlinghurst	Paddington	Edgecliff

Rushcutters Bay is a harbourside inner-east suburb of Sydney, in the state of New South Wales, Australia, 3 kilometres east of the Sydney central business district in the local government area of the City of Sydney.

The suburb of Rushcutters Bay sits beside the bay it takes its name from, on Sydney Harbour. It is surrounded by the suburbs of Elizabeth Bay, Darlinghurst, Paddington and Darling Point. Kings Cross is a locality on the western border.

== History ==
After British settlement, the area was first known as 'Rush Cutting Bay' because the swampy land was covered in tall rushes used by early settlers for thatching houses. In 1878, 2 hectares (6 acres) were reserved for recreation; and, after reclamation work was completed, Rushcutters Bay Park was created, bounded by New South Head Road and the bay at Sydney Harbour.

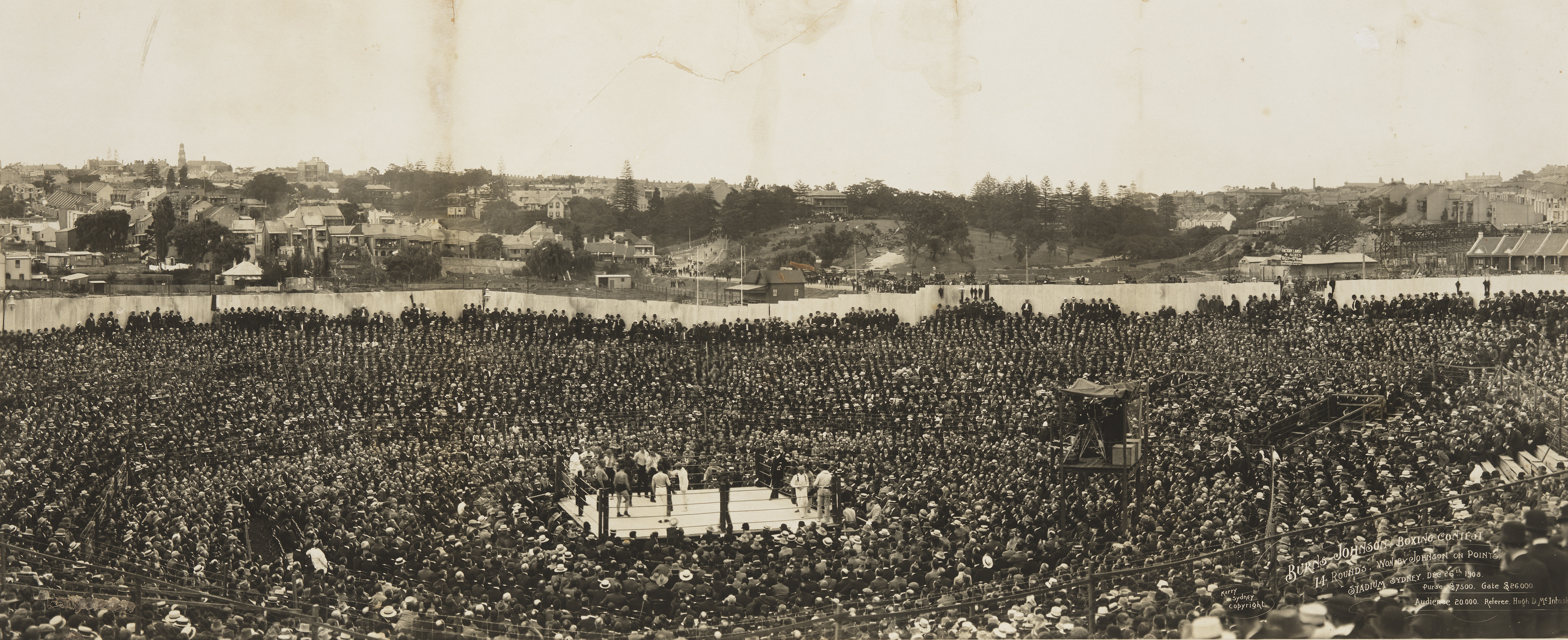
Jack Johnson-Tommy Burns boxing match at Sydney, 1908

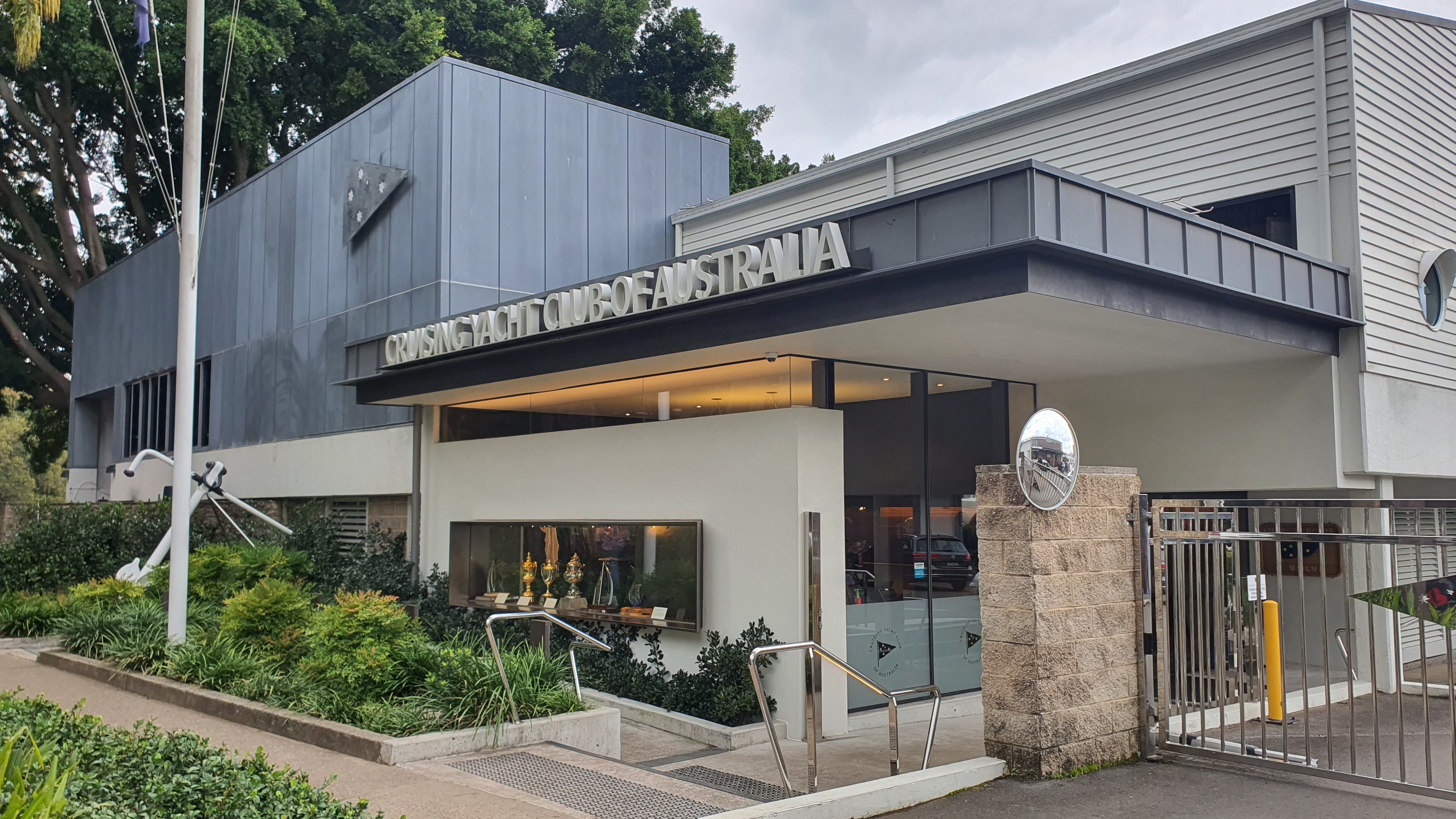
Cruising Yacht Club of Australia-Right view

Rushcutters Bay was once the site of the famous Sydney Stadium. On Boxing Day 1908 at the Stadium, Tommy Burns lost his heavyweight title to the legendary Jack Johnson, famously the first African-American to win a world title. For many years Rushcutters Bay was home to White City Stadium for major tennis tournaments, prior to the establishment of tennis facilities at Sydney Olympic Park.

On 6 April 1927 Herbert Pratten, Federal Minister for Trade, appeared in a Lee DeForest film to celebrate the opening of a Phonofilm studio in Rushcutters Bay.

In the 20th century, when neighbouring Darlinghurst was seen as down-at-heel, some businesses and residents abutting that boundary would, for appearance's sake, list their addresses as being in Rushcutters Bay. This phenomenon persists despite Darlinghurst's gentrification; for example, a BMW dealership on Craigend Street, Darlinghurst, provides customers with an incorrect address.

Rushcutters Bay Viaduct completed in 1974, after five years of phased construction. The viaduct was connected to the Eastern Suburbs railway line in Rushcutters Bay at its official opening on 23 June 1979.

The bay at Sydney Harbour served as host for the sailing events during the 2000 Summer Olympics.

== Heritage listings ==
Rushcutters Bay has a number of heritage-listed sites, including:

- Rushcutters Bay Park: Rushcutters Bay Sewage Pumping Station

== Demographics ==
According to the 2021 census, there were 2,335 people living in Rushcutters Bay. Of these:

- Age distribution: Residents had a similar range of ages to the country overall, except for notably fewer children. The median age was 38 years, the same as the national median. Children aged under 15 years made up 5.7% of the population (national average is 18.2%) and people aged 65 years and over made up 18.4% of the population (national average is 17.2%).
- Ethnic diversity : Just over half (56.5%) were born in Australia, compared to the national average of 66.9%; the next most common countries of birth were England 6.6%, New Zealand 3.8%, Brazil 1.4%, United States of America 1.3% and South Africa 1.3%. At home, 72.3% of residents only spoke English; other languages spoken at home included Spanish 1.9%, French 1.6%, Mandarin 1.5%, Italian 1.2% and Portuguese 1.2%.

At the 2016 census, the suburb of Rushcutters Bay recorded a population of 2,547 people.
