= Edgecliff, New South Wales =

Edgecliff
- Suburb
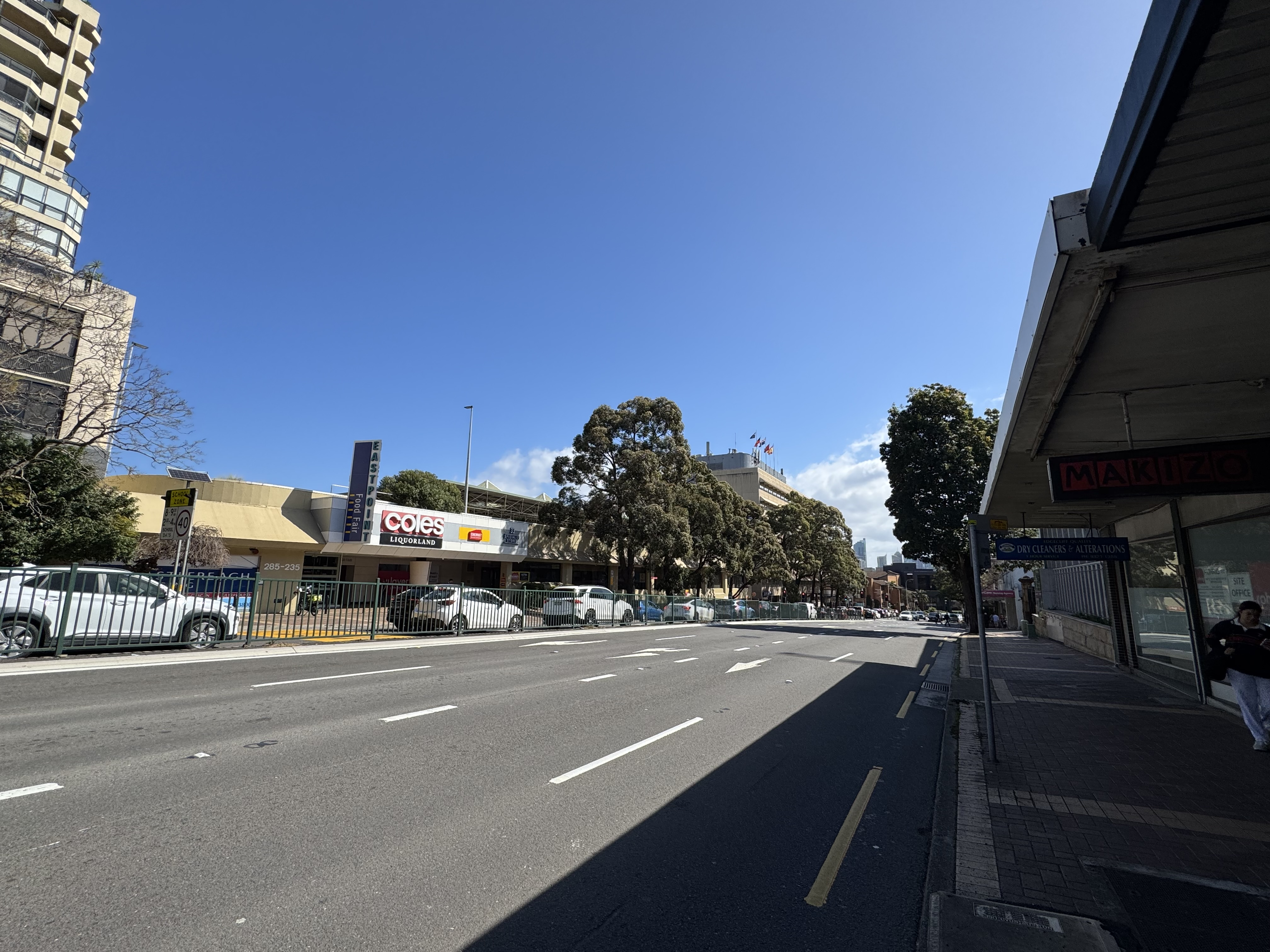
- New South Head Road

- Interactive map of Edgecliff
- Country: Australia
- State: New South Wales
- City: Sydney
- LGA: Municipality of Woollahra
- Location: 4 km (2.5 mi) E of Sydney CBD

Government
  - State electorates: Sydney; Vaucluse
  - Federal division: Wentworth

Area
  - Total: 0.32 km^{2} (0.12 sq mi)
- Elevation: 39 m (128 ft)

Population
  - Total: 2,499 (SAL 2021)
- Postcode: 2027
Suburbs around Edgecliff
Rushcutters Bay	Darling Point	Double Bay
Darlinghurst	Edgecliff	Double Bay
Paddington	Woollahra	Bellevue Hill

Edgecliff is a small suburb in the Eastern Suburbs of Sydney, in the state of New South Wales, Australia. Edgecliff is located 4 kilometres east of the Sydney central business district, in the local government area of the Municipality of Woollahra. The postcode is 2027.

Edgecliff is surrounded by the suburbs of Double Bay, Woollahra, Paddington, Rushcutters Bay and Darling Point. The property prices are very high because it is close to the city and many homes provide views of Port Jackson (Sydney Harbour).

== History ==
Edgecliff takes its name from its geographic siting. The rocky cliff of the suburb was extensively quarried in the early day of European settlement.

The area was dominated for some time by the Glenrock property, on the north side of New South Head Road. Sir Edward Knox built Fiona in 1864 after having it designed by J. F. Hilly. It has been described as "a Classical Revival two-storey mansion" and was made of sandstone. Other elements of the estate included Glenrock, an Italianate residence designed by David MacBeath and built by John Marks circa 1870. There were also substantial gates of wrought iron and sandstone. The building was demolished when New South Head Road was widened, but the gates survived. Also on the estate was the Dower House, a Victorian Gothic Revival house of sandstone, built some time after 1842 by Whistler Smith. The estate is now the site of Ascham School, and the above items are on the National Estate.

In September 1894, a cable tram service opened, which operated from King Street in the city to Ocean Street in Edgecliff. The powerhouse driving it was located at Rushcutters Bay. Unlike other trams of the era which were driven by steam, the cable ran in a gutter between the tracks. The cars gripped the moving cable to advance and released it to stop. It operated until 1905 when the tram line was electrified. Edgecliff railway station opened in 1979, when the Eastern Suburbs railway line was opened from Central to Bondi Junction.

== Heritage listings ==
Edgecliff has a number of heritage-listed sites, including:

- 8 Albert Street: Fenton and surrounds

== Demographics ==
At the 2021 census, the population of Edgecliff was 2,499. Most people in Edgecliff came from Anglo-Celtic backgrounds with the most common ancestries being English 33.8%, Australian 24.2%, Irish 14.5% and Scottish 10.4%. 58.1% of people were born in Australia. The next most common country of birth was England at 6.9%. 77.6% of people only spoke English at home. The most common responses for religion were No Religion 42.5% and Catholic 18.5%. Housing in Edgecliff is high density and most occupied private dwellings were apartments (69.9%). Most of the remaining dwellings were semi-detached (23.6%).

== Commercial area ==
Commercial developments are located on New South Head Road. The Edgecliff Centre is a commercial building with retail space close to the transport services and office space above. Edgecliff Eastpoint is a shopping centre above Edgecliff railway station and below the bus interchange.

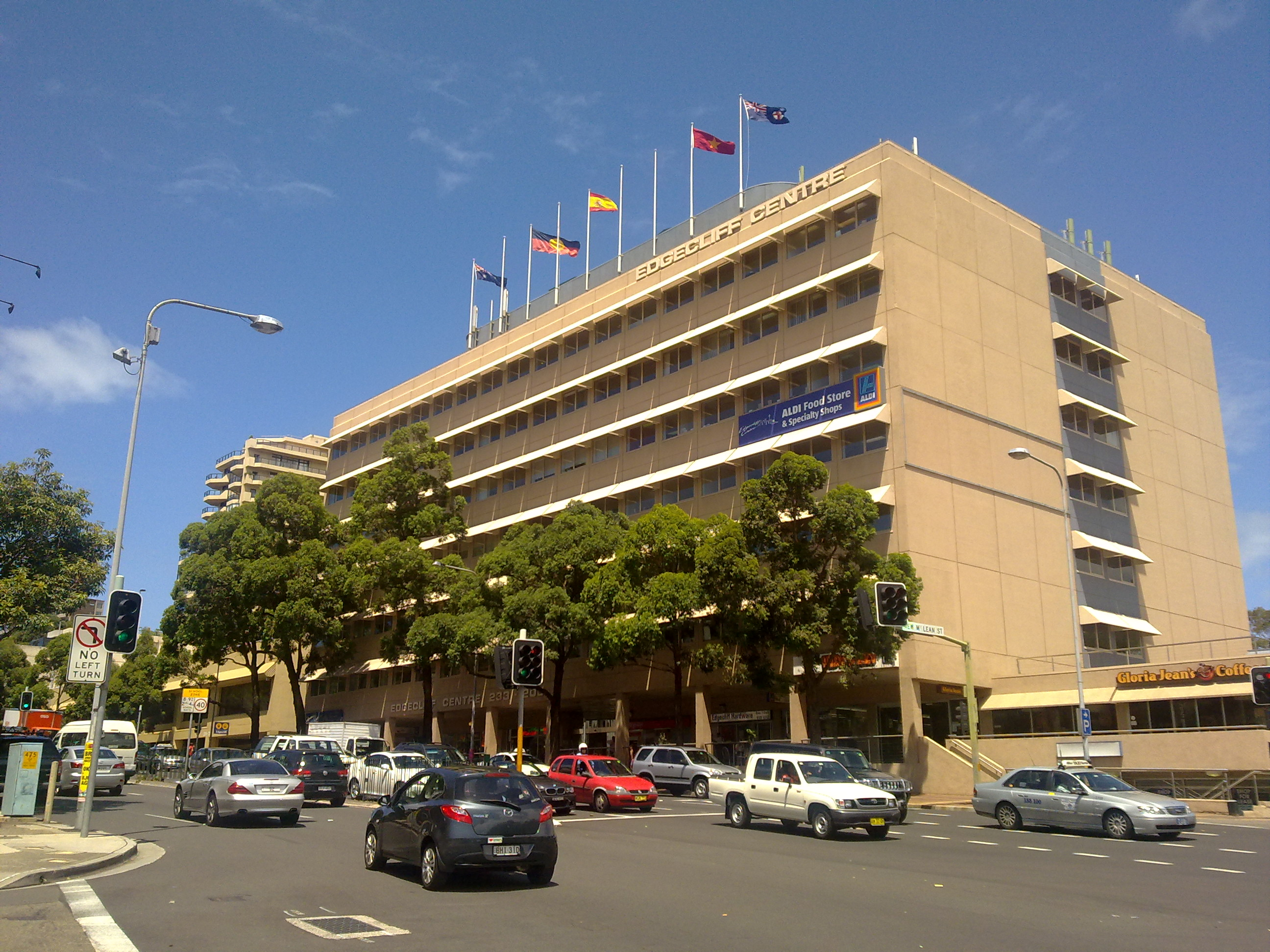
Edgecliff Centre

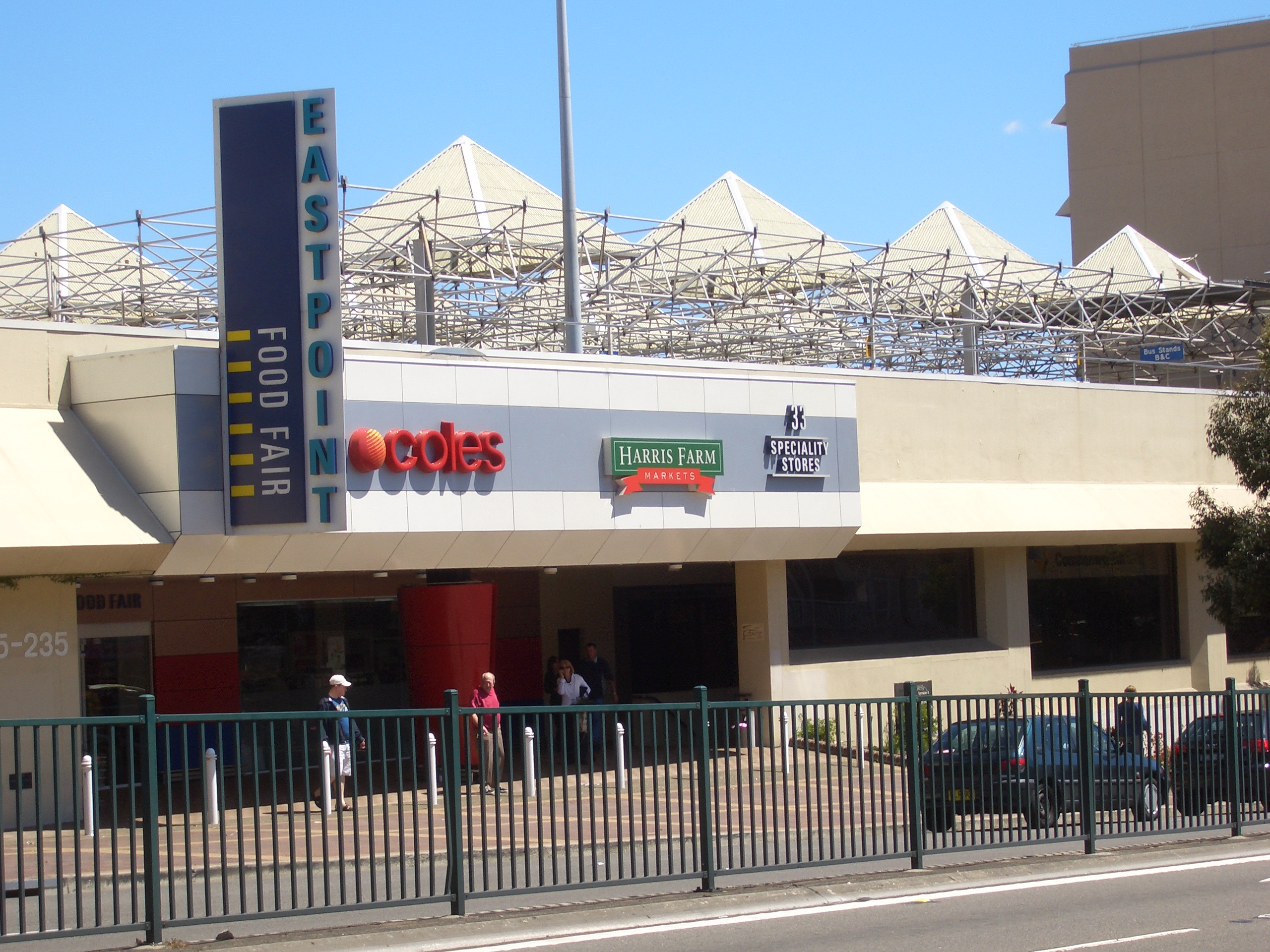
Edgecliff Eastpoint, bus interchange on roof

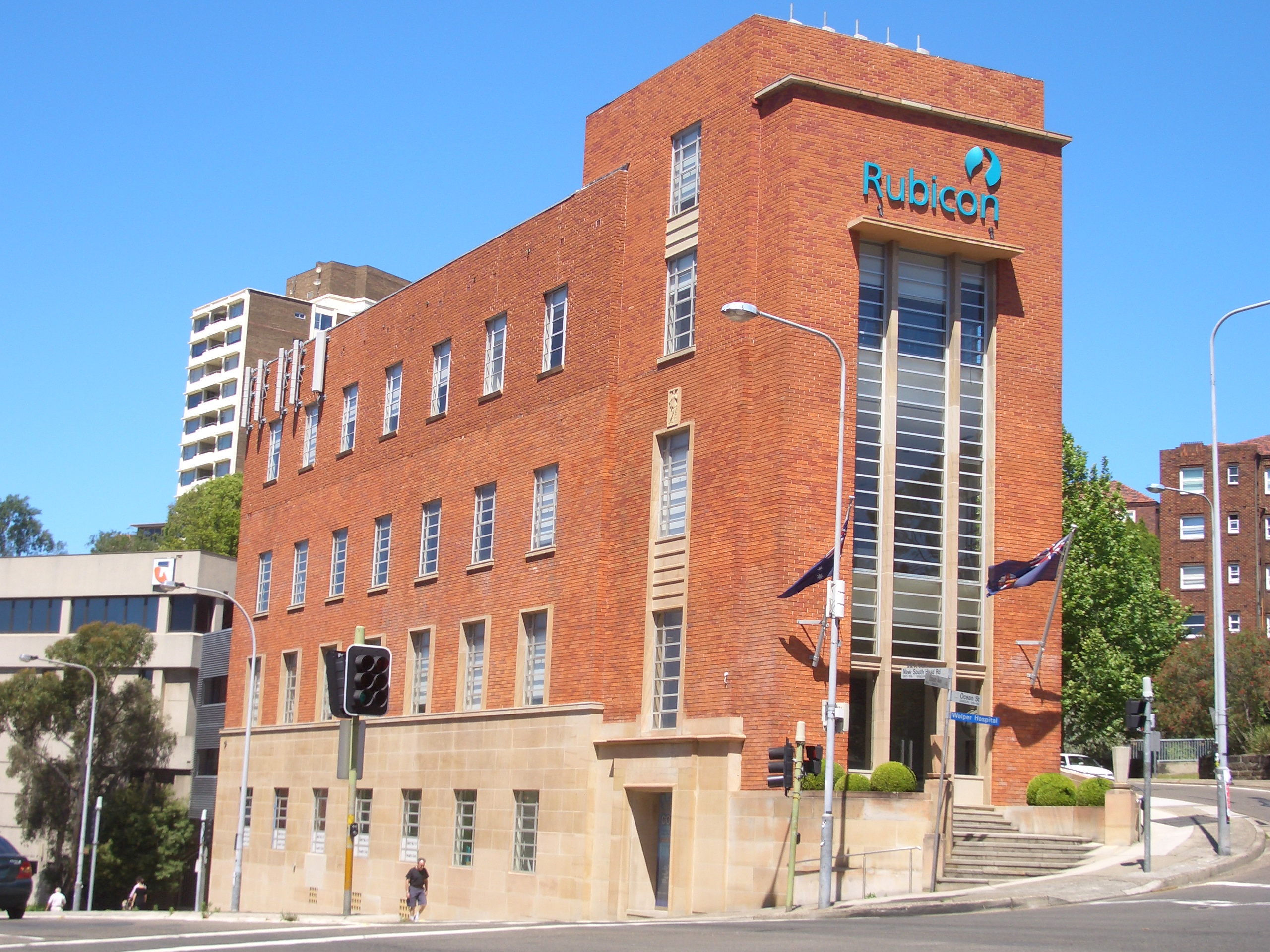
Former post office and telephone exchange

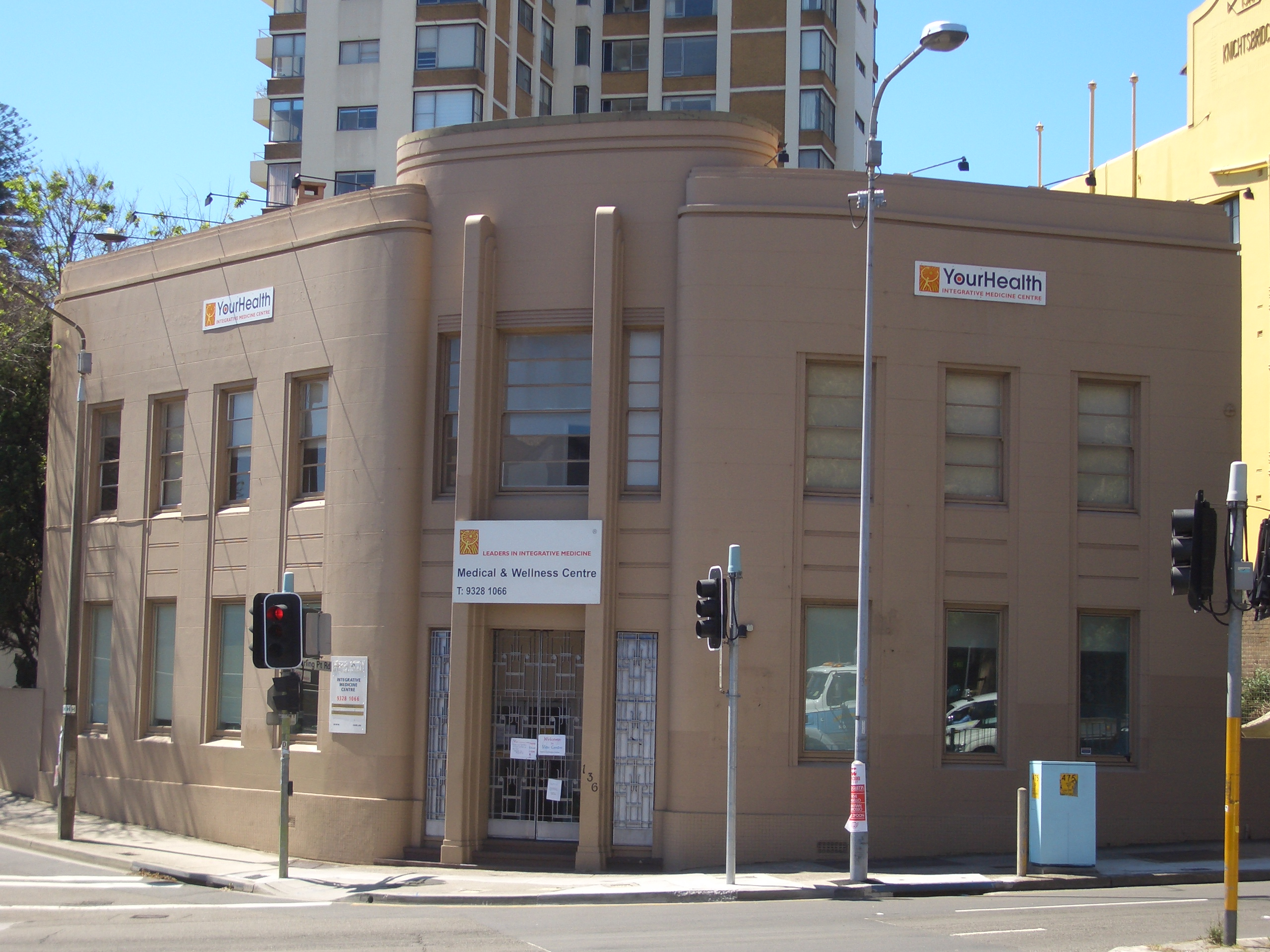
Former bank

== Transport ==
Edgecliff railway station is an underground railway station on the Eastern Suburbs Line of the Sydney Trains network serving Edgecliff. During peak times the station sees trains every 3 to 5 minutes, during off peak times trains arrive around every 8–10 minutes. A bus interchange is located above the railway station.

== Schools ==
Ascham School and one of Sydney Grammar's preparatory schools are on the Edgecliff borders. The Weigall Sports Field and White City, which both belong to Sydney Grammar School, are also located nearby.

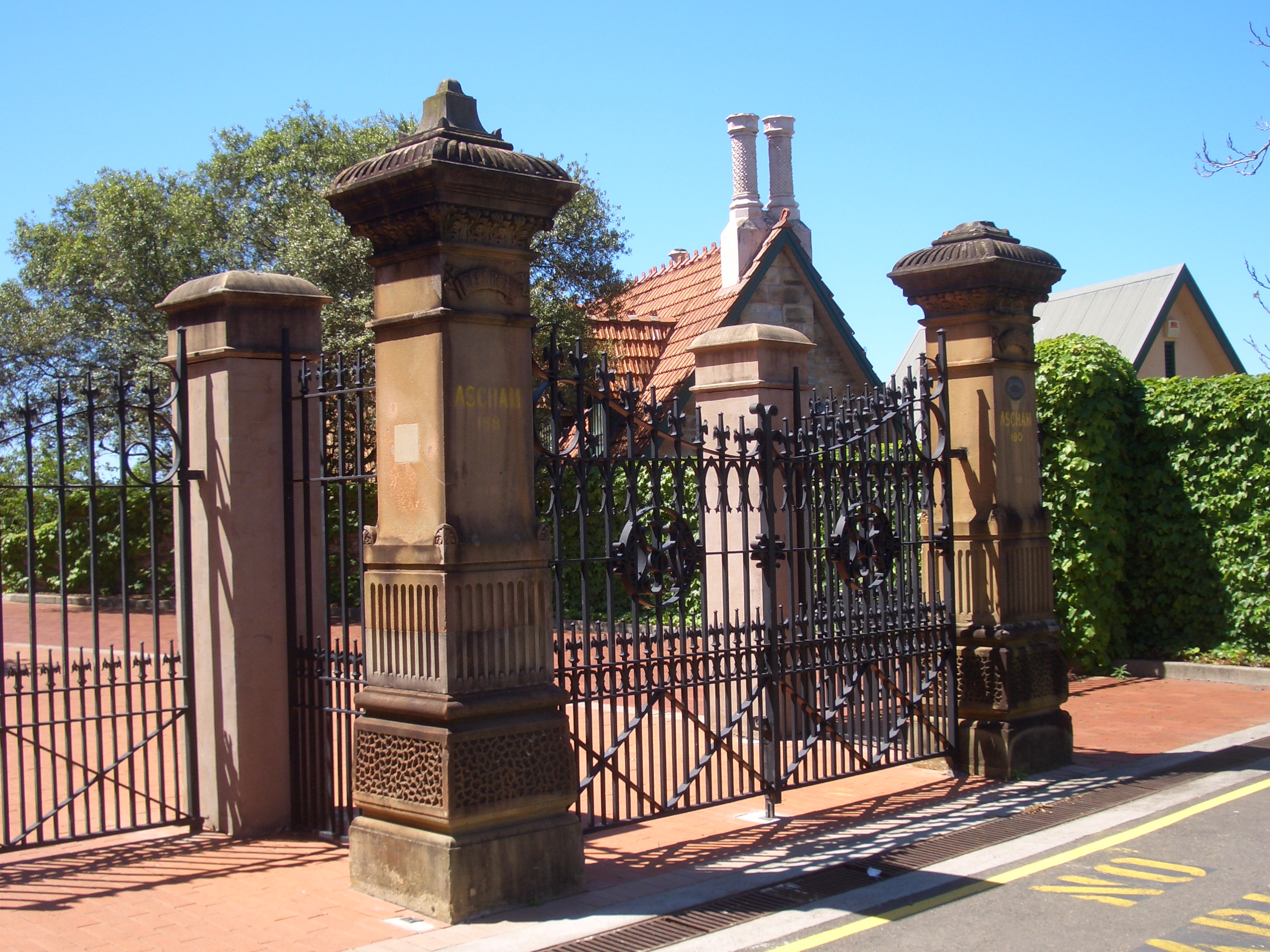
Ascham Girls' School gates

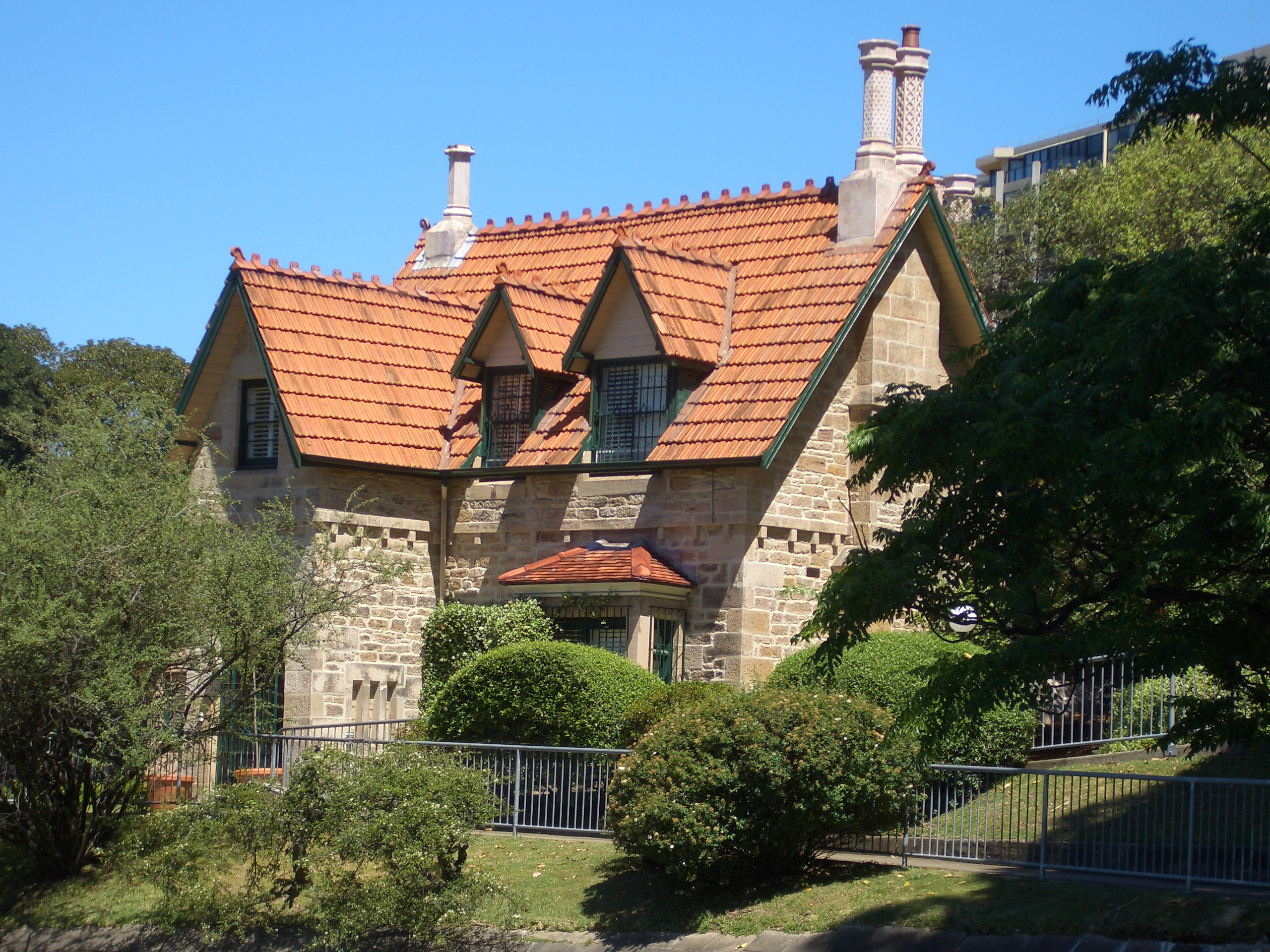
Glenrock, Ascham Girls' School (on the National Estate)

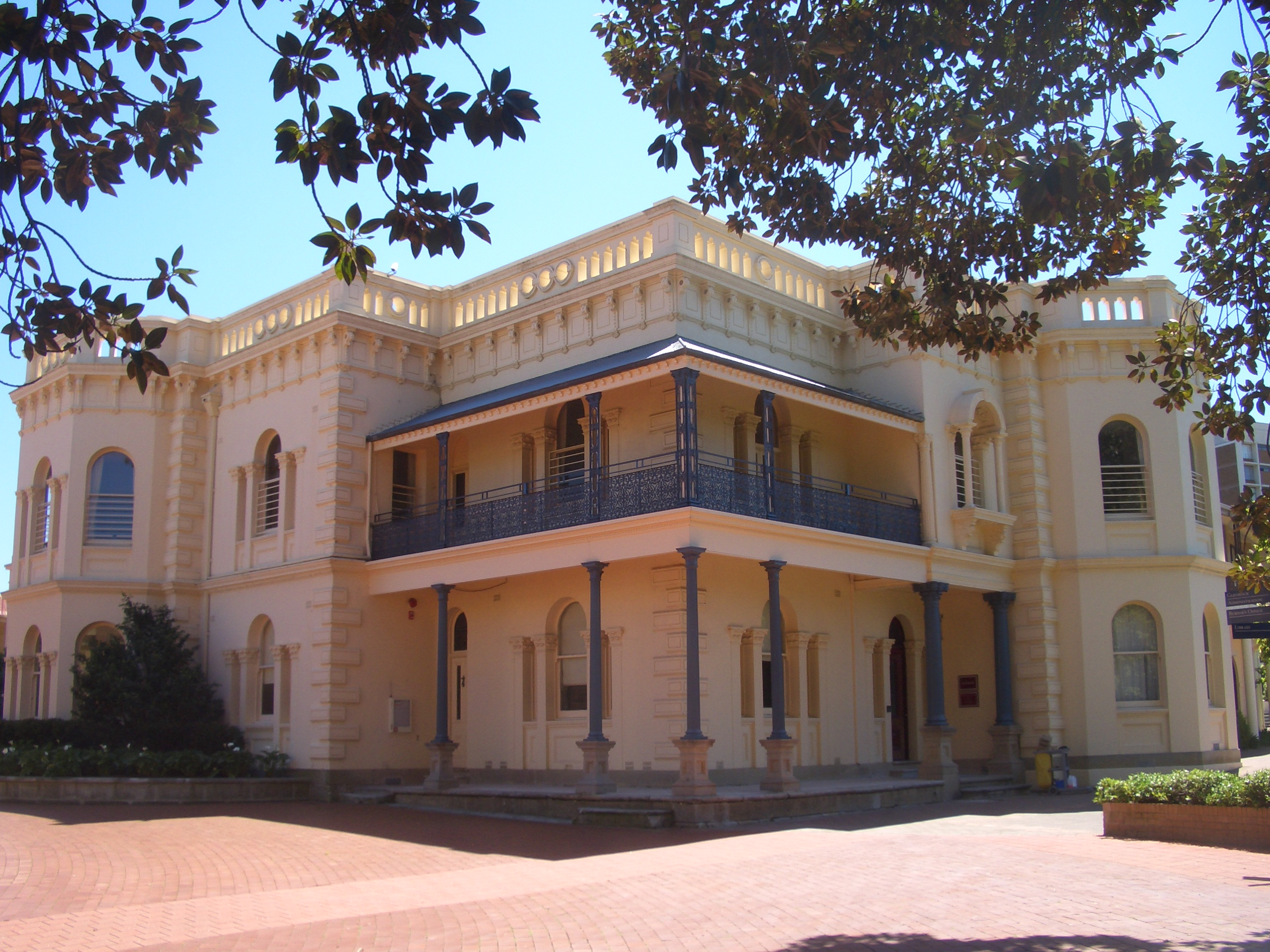
Ascham Girls' School

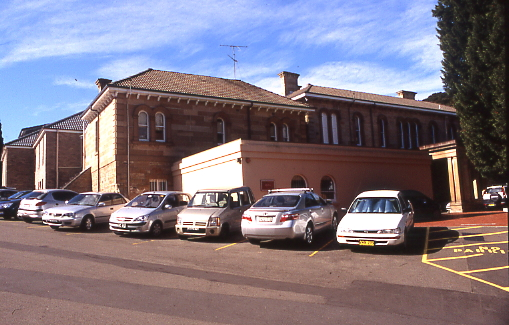
Ascham Girls' School; the sandstone building in the centre is Fiona, built in 1864 (on the National Estate)

== Sport and recreation ==
Since 1908, Edgecliff has been represented in one of Australia's most popular sporting competitions, the National Rugby League, by the Sydney Roosters, officially known as the Eastern Suburbs District Rugby League Football Club.
