= Kings Cross railway station, Sydney =

Railway station in Sydney, New South Wales, Australia

Kings Cross
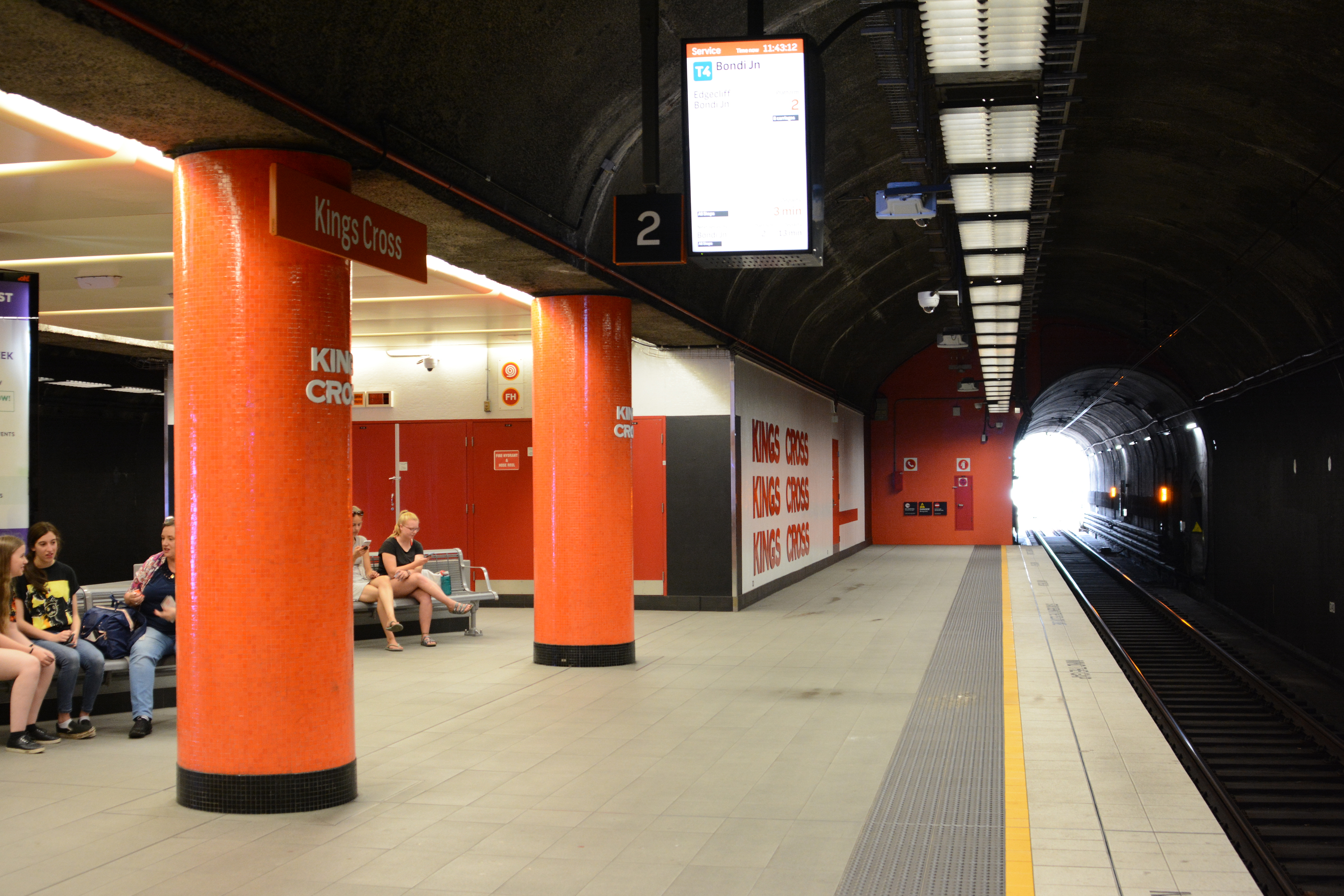
- Westbound view from platform 2, March 2019

General information
- Location: Darlinghurst Road, Kings Cross; Australia
- Coordinates: 33°52′29″S 151°13′21″E
- Owner: Transport Asset Manager of New South Wales
- Operator: Sydney Trains
- Line: Eastern Suburbs
- Distance: 3.41 kilometres (2.12 mi) from Central
- Platforms: 2 (1 island)
- Tracks: 2
- Connections: Bus

Construction
- Structure type: Underground
- Accessible: Yes

Other information
- Status: Staffed
- Station code: KSX
- Website: Transport for NSW

History
- Opened: 23 June 1979

Passengers
- 2025: 7,975,598 (year); 21,851 (daily) (Sydney Trains)
- Rank: 21

Services
Preceding station	Sydney Trains	Following station
Martin Place towards Waterfall or Cronulla	Eastern Suburbs & Illawarra Line	Edgecliff towards Bondi Junction
Preceding station	Intercity Trains	Following station
Martin Place towards Kiama	South Coast Line (morning and evening services)	Edgecliff towards Bondi Junction
Location

Kings Cross railway station is a heritage-listed railway station located on the Eastern Suburbs line, serving the Sydney suburb of Kings Cross. It is served by Sydney Trains T4 Eastern Suburbs & Illawarra Line services and Sydney Trains South Coast Line services.

== History ==
Kings Cross station opened on 23 June 1979 when the Eastern Suburbs line opened from Central to Bondi Junction.

The station was upgraded in 2004 and received a lift and tactile indicators. In 2016, Kings Cross was refurbished with new tiling, tactile indicators and the platform walls repainted.

== Platforms and services ==
Platform	Line	Stopping pattern	Notes
1	T4	services to Cronulla, Waterfall & Helensburgh	
1	SCO	services to Wollongong, Dapto & Kiama	only during peak hours and weekends
2	T4	services to Bondi Junction	
2	SCO	services to Bondi Junction	only during peak hours and weekends

== Transport links ==
Transdev John Holland operates three bus routes via Kings Cross station, under contract to Transport for NSW:

- 311: Millers Point to Eddy Avenue
- 324: Walsh Bay to Watsons Bay via Old South Head Road
- 325: Walsh Bay to Watsons Bay via Vaucluse

== Gallery ==
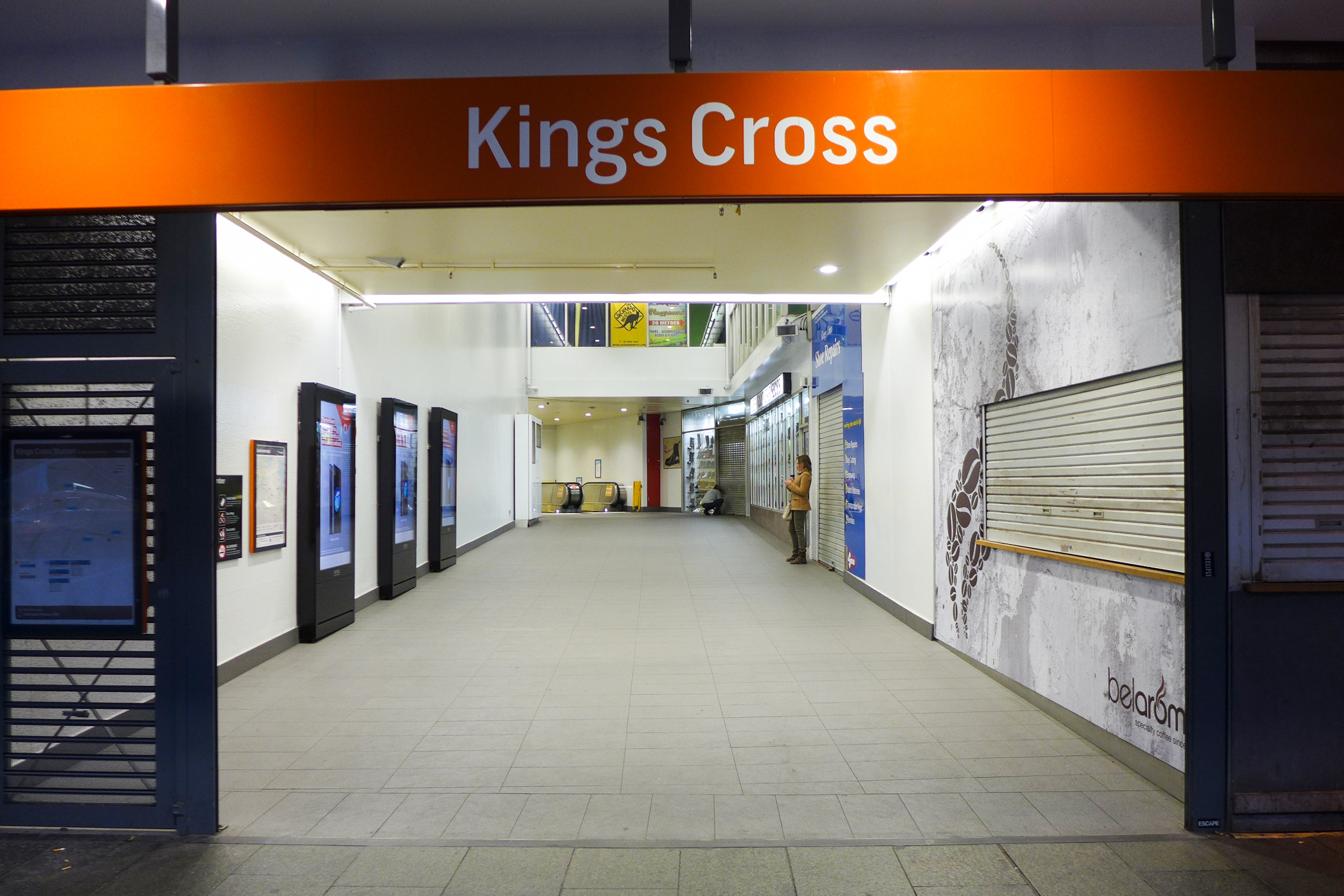
Station entrance, August 2017

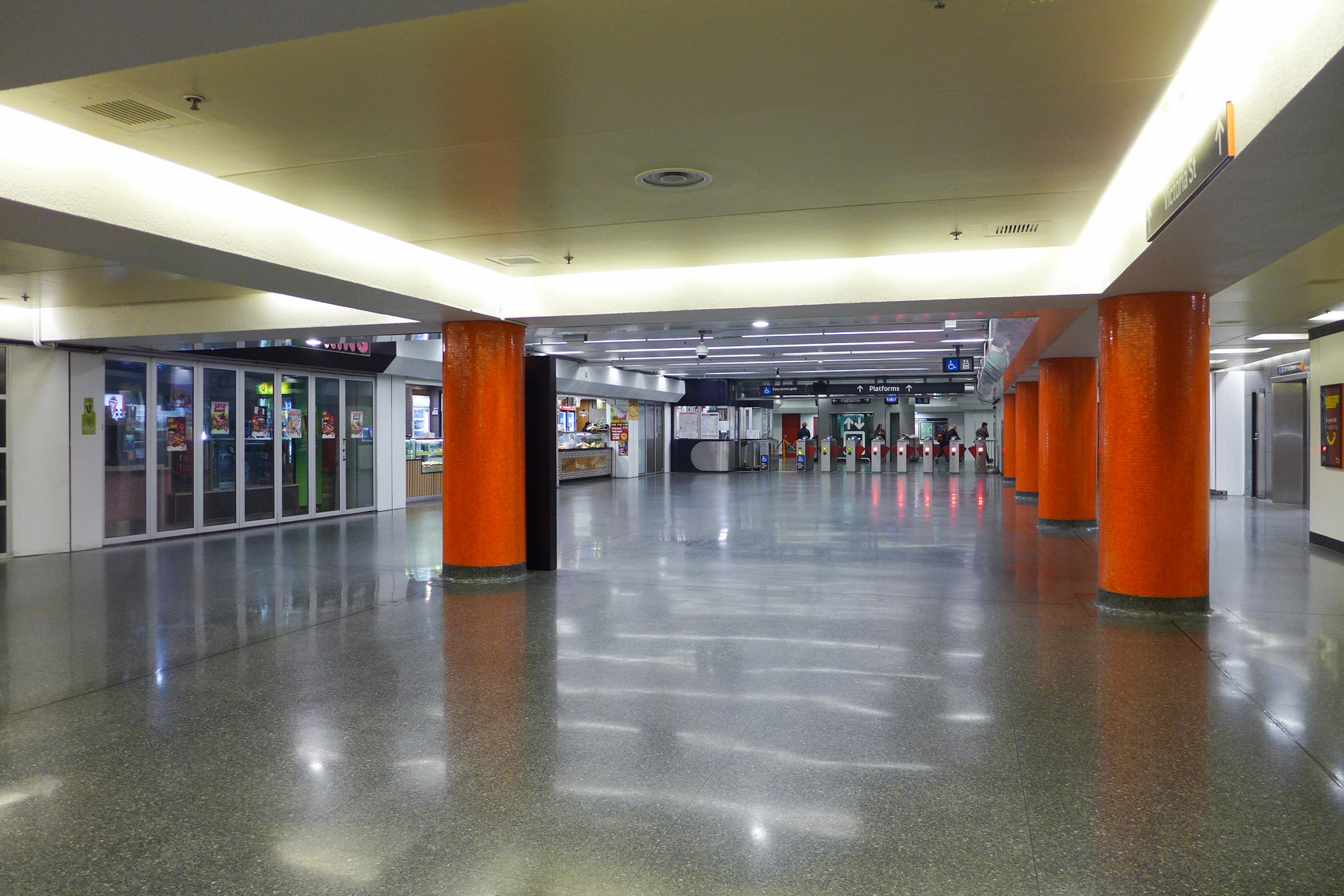
Station concourse, August 2017

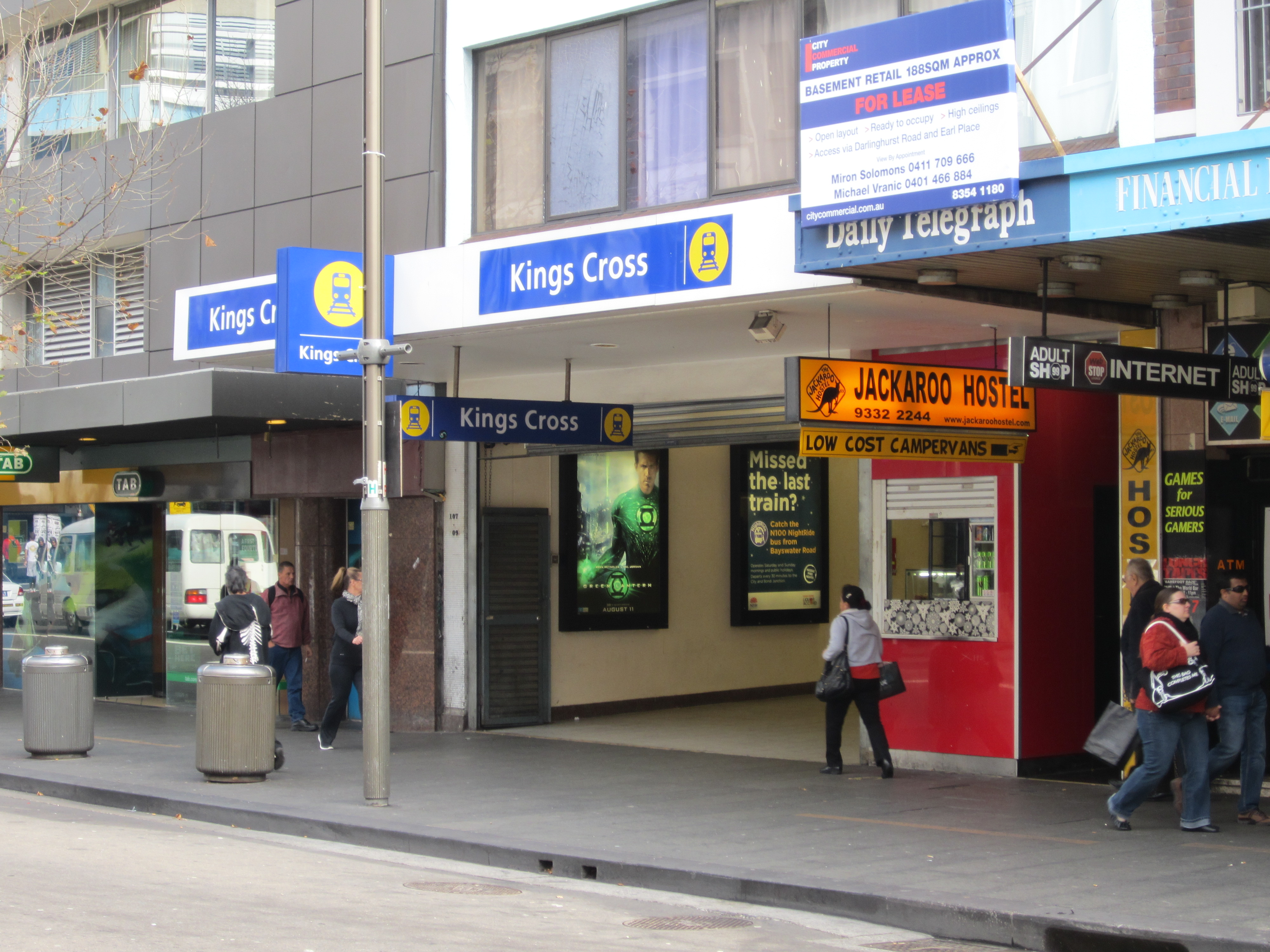
Station front, August 2011
