= Fenton and surrounds =

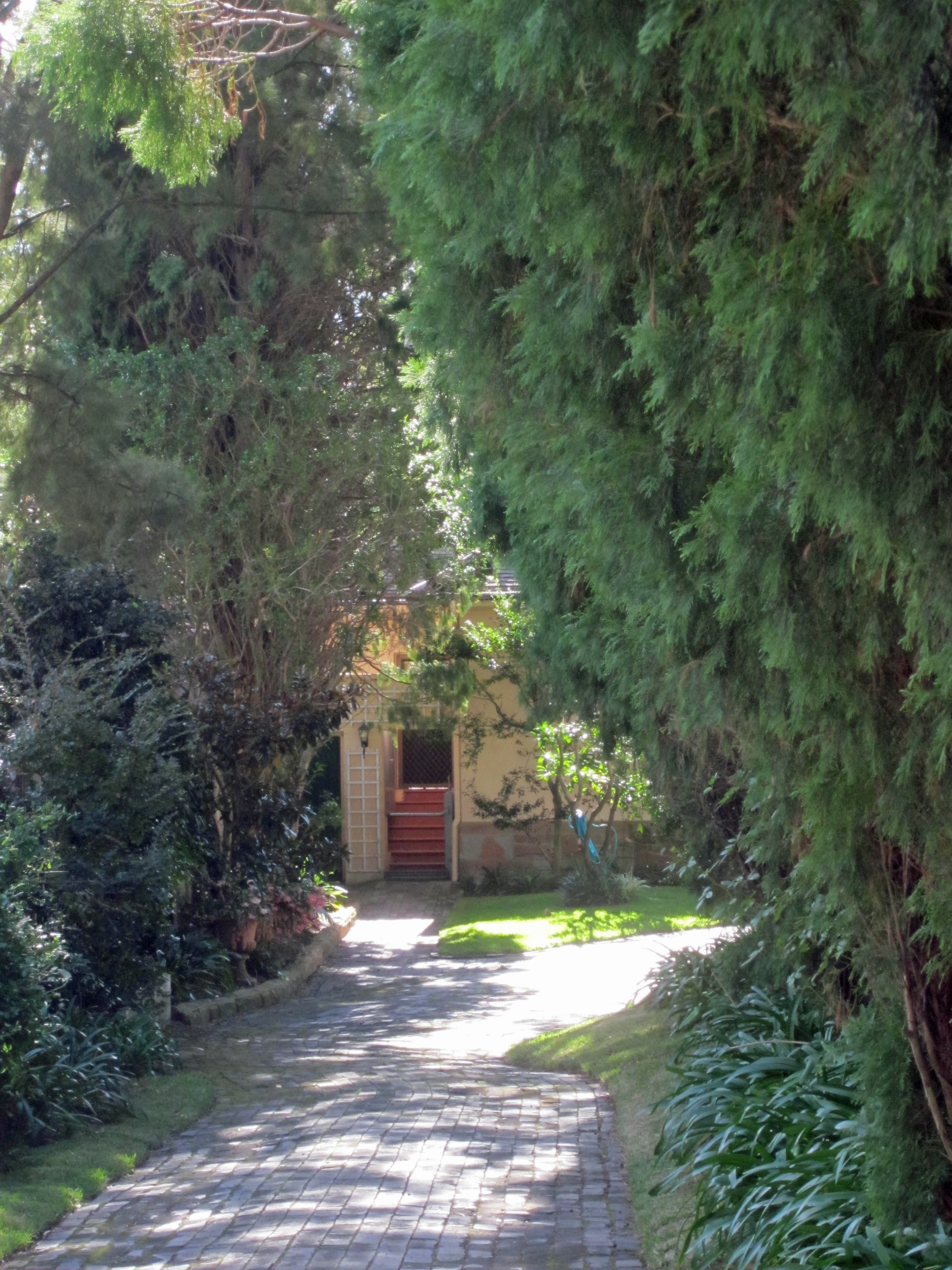
- Entrance to Fenton and surrounds, 8 Albert Street, Edgecliff, NSW

- Location within Sydney Location within Australia
- 33°52′50″S 151°14′19″E
- Location: 8 Albert Street, Edgecliff, Municipality of Woollahra, New South Wales, Australia

New South Wales Heritage Register
- Official name: Fenton and surrounds
- Type: State heritage (built)
- Designated: 2 April 1999
- Reference no.: 249
- Type: House
- Category: Residential buildings (private)

Fenton and surrounds is a heritage-listed house at 8 Albert Street, Edgecliff, New South Wales, an eastern suburb of Sydney, Australia. The house was designed by Robin Dods in 1919. It was added to the New South Wales State Heritage Register on 2 April 1999. The property is privately owned.

== History ==
The site was originally part of the Orielton Estate, which had been built in Edgecliff in the 1860s. Following subdivision in 1918, Dods purchased the largest of the 4 allotments and built his most important house. It drew on his years of practice and, as his own house, it was presumably an opportunity to realise much more of his vision. Whether Dods knew Fenton would be his last house is uncertain, but during its construction he became progressively weaker and eventually, around the time of its completion, had ceased work altogether. The home was passed down to Dod's son and pioneering Australian pediatrician, Sir Lorimer Fenton Dods.

== Heritage listing ==
Fenton and surrounds was listed on the New South Wales State Heritage Register on 2 April 1999.

== Description ==
Fenton is set on 1,410 square metres (15,177 sq ft). Situated down a long brick paved driveway planted with tall Cypress pines, the drive opens into a walled garden. The home sits modestly elevated on sandstone dressings, with a recessed entrance porch framed by simple columns. The main entrance door sits between elegant carved jambs with sidelights and an elaborate leaded fanlight of Georgian derivation above.
