= Edgecliff railway station =

Railway station in Sydney, New South Wales, Australia

Edgecliff
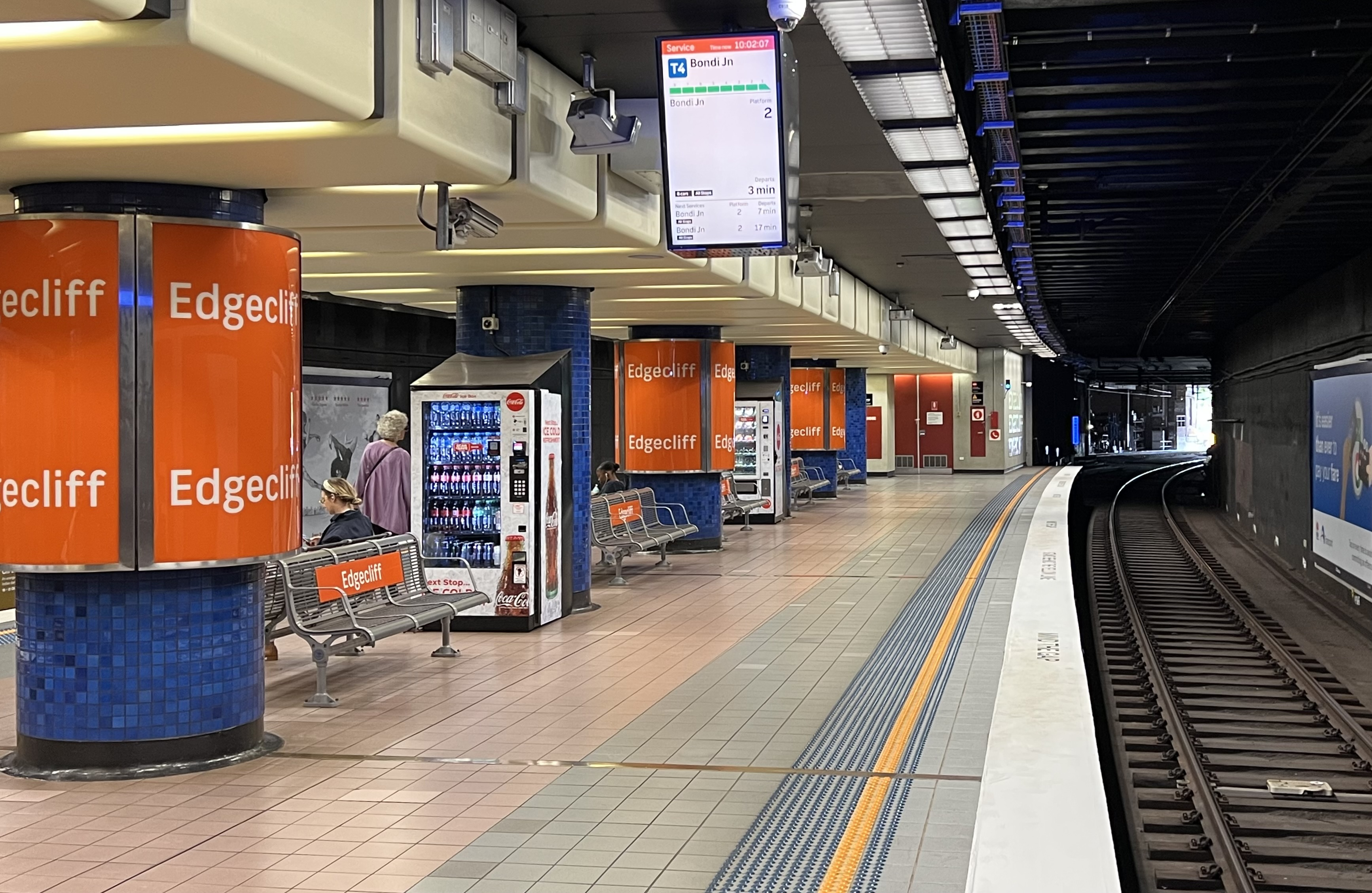
- South-east bound view from Platform 2, November 2023

General information
- Location: New South Head Road, Edgecliff; Sydney, New South Wales; Australia
- Coordinates: 33°52′45″S 151°14′10″E
- Owner: Transport Asset Manager of NSW
- Operator: Sydney Trains
- Line: Eastern Suburbs
- Distance: 4.82 km (3.00 mi) from Central
- Platforms: 2 (1 island)
- Tracks: 2
- Connections: Bus

Construction
- Structure type: Underground
- Accessible: Yes

Other information
- Status: Staffed
- Station code: ECL
- Website: Transport for NSW

History
- Opened: 23 June 1979 (47 years ago)
- Electrified: Yes (from opening)

Passengers
- 2025: 4,416,684 (year); 12,101 (daily) (Sydney Trains)
- Rank: 40

Services
Preceding station	Sydney Trains	Following station
Kings Cross towards Waterfall or Cronulla	Eastern Suburbs & Illawarra Line	Bondi Junction Terminus
Preceding station	Intercity Trains	Following station
Kings Cross towards Kiama	South Coast Line (morning and evening services)	Bondi Junction Terminus
Planned services
Preceding station	Sydney Trains	Following station
Kings Cross towards Waterfall or Cronulla	Eastern Suburbs & Illawarra Line	Woollahra towards Bondi Junction
Location

Edgecliff railway station is a suburban railway station located on the Eastern Suburbs line, serving the Sydney suburb of Edgecliff. It is served by Sydney Trains T4 Eastern Suburbs & Illawarra Line services and intercity South Coast Line services.

== History ==
Whilst the Eastern Suburbs Railway was not originally intended to travel via Edgecliff, the first proposal for an Edgecliff station was in 1947. In 1963 it was suggested that Edgecliff be the terminus of the first stage of the railway, but by 1967 it was decided Bondi Junction was a better terminus location.

Edgecliff station opened on 23 June 1979 when the Eastern Suburbs line opened from Central to Bondi Junction.

Although not directly mentioned in projects associated with the Rail Clearways Program, work was taken out at Edgecliff as a part of the Bondi Junction Turnback project. This involved the motorisation and signalling of an emergency crossover located at the western end of the station. Previously it had not been possible to ordinarily terminate trains at Edgecliff. When completed in September 2004 it permitted trains to terminate at Edgecliff and return towards the city. This was necessary to allow the closing of Bondi Junction station while major work was carried out there but allowing the line to otherwise remain open.

On 15 January 2014, a Tangara derailed just past Edgecliff. It was found that an incorrect repair had been done to one of the axles of the train in 1998–1999, leading to the axle eventually breaking. During the derailment, a piece of metal, used for the edge of a concrete slab on the track, was lifted and pierced into the passenger cabin, almost injuring several passengers.

An accessibility upgrade for the station was announced in September 2015. In June 2019, the new access ramp on New McLean Street was opened and the bus canopy extension completed. The upgrade is now complete.

== Services ==
=== Platforms ===
Platform	Line	Stopping pattern	Notes
1	Eastern Suburbs & Illawarra Line	services to Cronulla, Waterfall & Helensburgh	
1	South Coast Line	services to Wollongong, Dapto & Kiama	only during peak hours and weekends
2	Eastern Suburbs & Illawarra Line	services to Bondi Junction	
2	South Coast Line	services to Bondi Junction	only during peak hours and weekends

=== Transport links ===
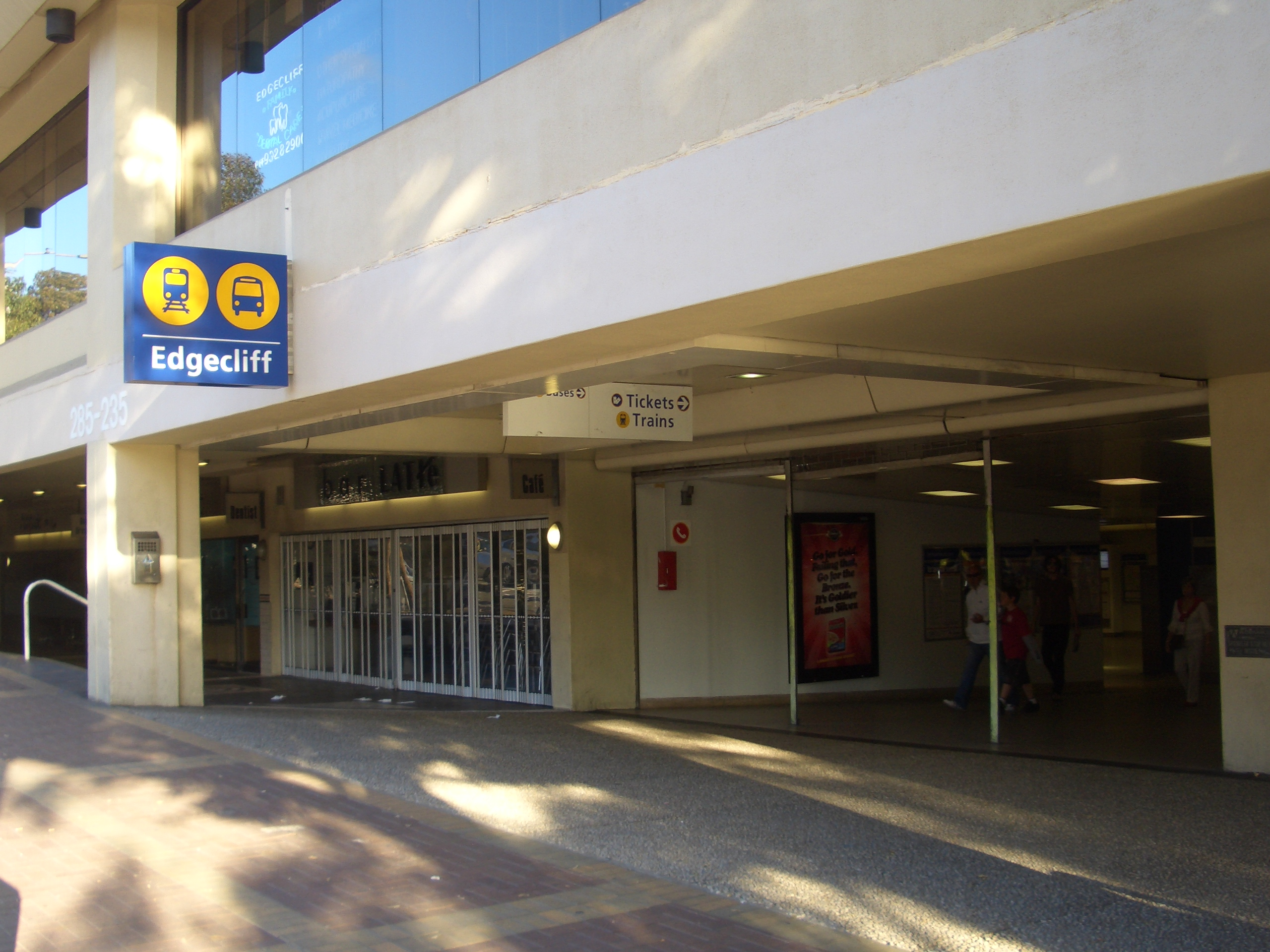
Entrance on New South Head Road in August 2007

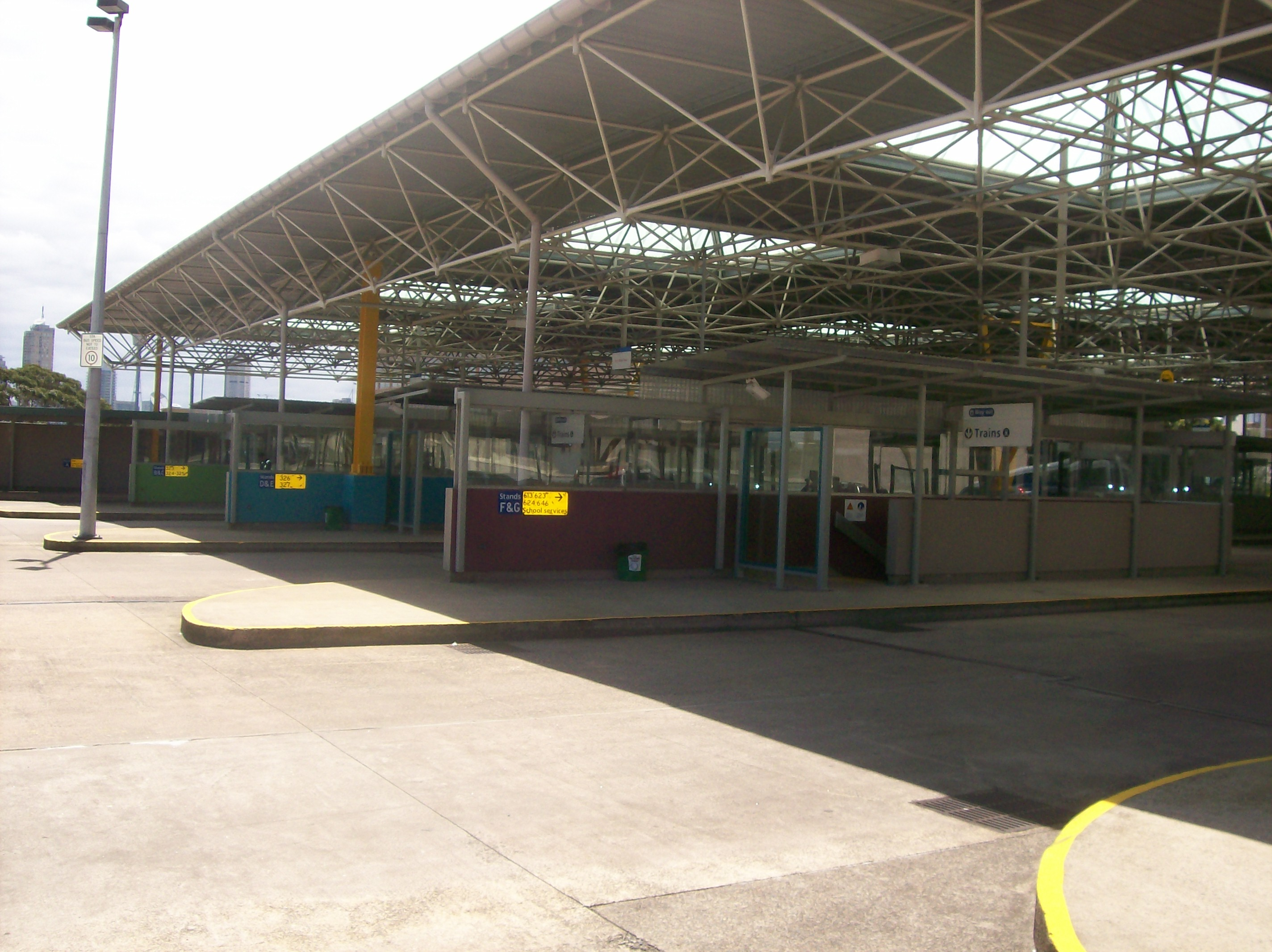
Bus Interchange in December 2011

Upon opening most bus services travelling past the station towards the city were curtailed to terminate at the station. Despite the 1976 review that caused the design of the bus interchanges at Edgecliff and Bondi Junction to be scaled back, significant work was completed at Edgecliff to better facilitate these bus route changes: a tunnel had been dug under Ocean Street and Edgecliff Road, around the Edgecliff Post Office to New South Head Road.

However, because the time savings of the train over the bus from Edgecliff were minimal and integrated ticketing was not available, fewer passengers than anticipated opted to change modes at the interchange. As initially configured, the westernmost platform was reserved for arrivals, with 11 stands spread across four platforms for departures with a stabling facility at the eastern end.

In June 2002, the status of the interchange declined with a number of the routes that terminated at Edgecliff either cancelled or extended through to the city, operating directly via New South Head Road. It is now used only by services to the city from Bondi Junction (and vice versa) plus those from the city to the Eastern Suburbs continuing east along New South Head Road.

The former control room has been leased to non government organisation Holdsworth Community along with the former bus stabling area.

The following routes operate from Edgecliff Interchange. All routes operated by the Transdev John Holland.

Stand A:

- Not in use

Stand B:

- Not in use

Stand C:

- 323: to Dover Heights
- 328: to Bondi Junction station

Stand D:

- 324: to Watsons Bay via Old South Head Road
- 325: to Watsons Bay via Vaucluse

Stand E:

- Arrivals only

Stand F:

- 326: to Bondi Junction station via Bellevue Hill
- 327: to Bondi Junction station via Manning Road

Stand G:

- 328: to Darling Point

Stand H:

- Arrivals only

Stand J:

- 328: to Darling Point

Stand K:

- School services only

Stand L:

- Arrivals only

Stand M:

- School services only

Stand N: (New South Head Rd)

- 324: to Walsh Bay
- 325: to Walsh Bay
- 328: to Darling Point

== Trackplan ==
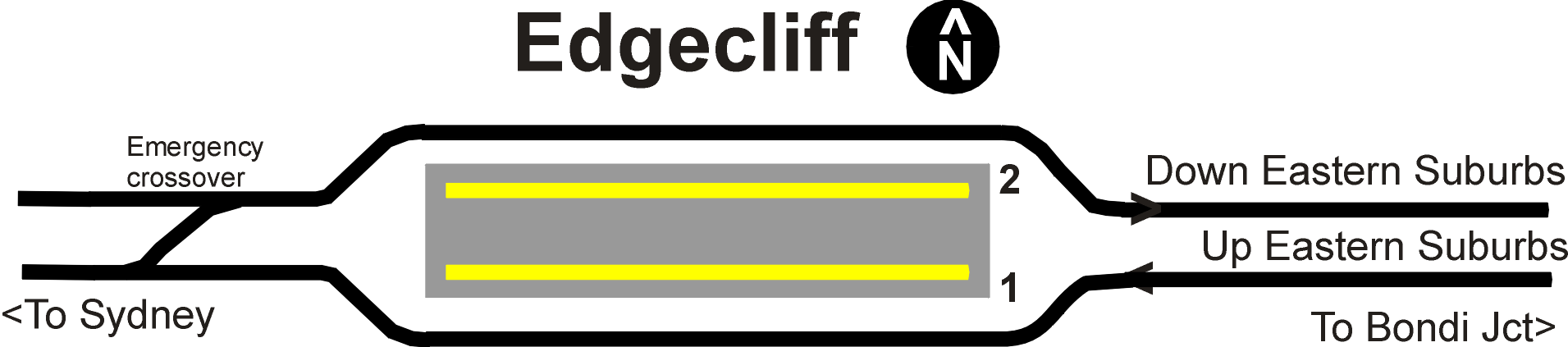
Track arrangement at Edgecliff
