= Woollahra railway station =

Uncompleted railway station in Sydney, New South Wales, Australia

Woollahra
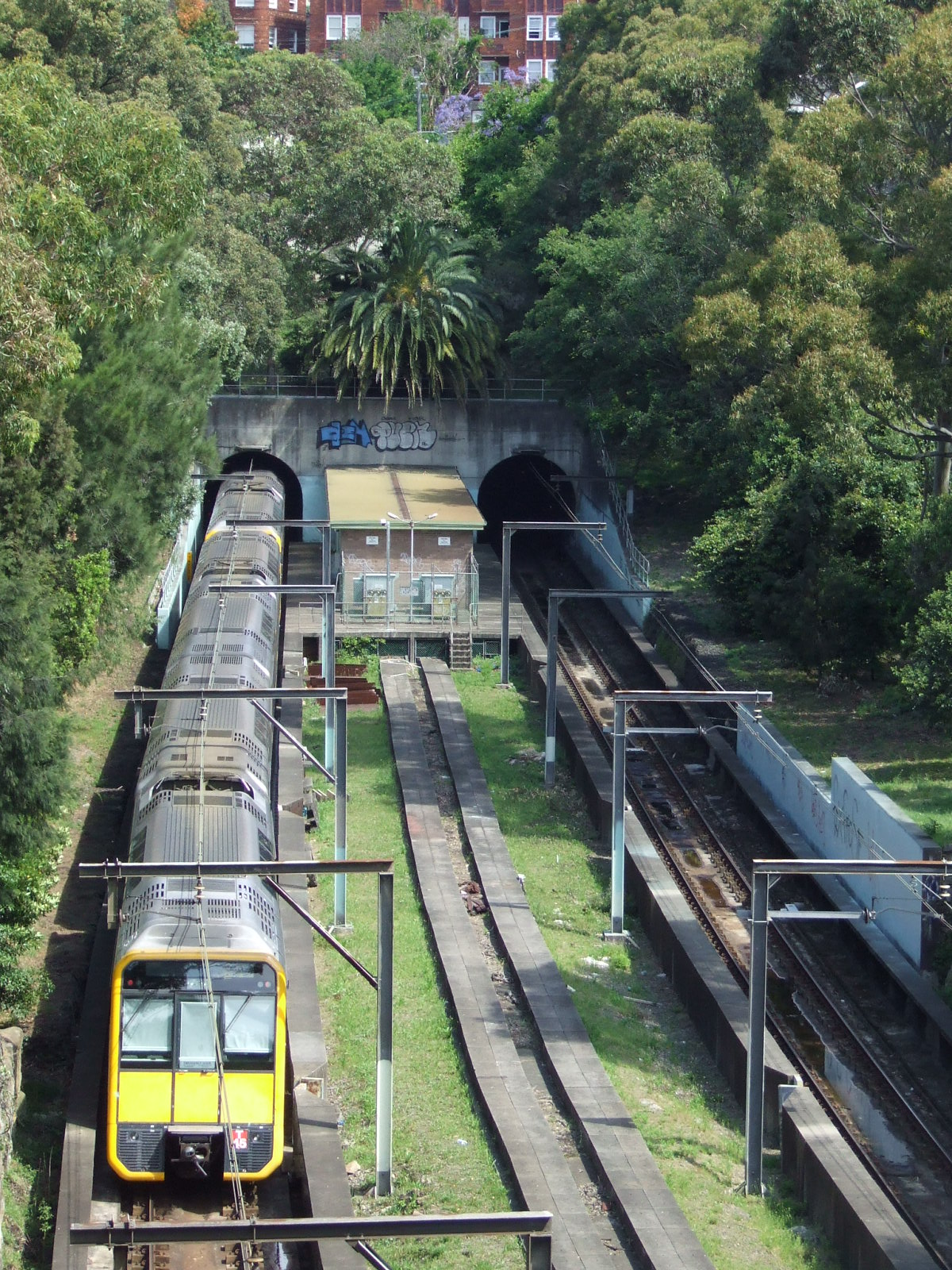
- A Tangara passes through the incomplete station site in October 2007

General information
- Location: Edgecliff Road, Woollahra; Sydney, New South Wales; Australia
- Coordinates: 33°53′07″S 151°14′35″E
- Line: Eastern Suburbs
- Platforms: 2 (1 island)
- Tracks: 2

Construction
- Structure type: Ground

Other information
- Status: Planned

History
- Opened: 2029 (planned)

Planned services
Preceding station	Sydney Trains	Following station
Edgecliff towards Waterfall or Cronulla	T4 Eastern Suburbs & Illawarra Line	Bondi Junction Terminus
Location

Woollahra railway station is an uncompleted railway station on the Eastern Suburbs line, built to serve the Sydney suburb of Woollahra. First planned in 1915 and partly constructed in the 1970s between Edgecliff and Bondi Junction, the station site is in a cutting off Edgecliff Road. Opposition from local residents and the costs associated with the construction of the Eastern Suburbs railway as a whole prevented the station from being opened with the line in 1979.

In August 2025, the New South Wales state government announced that it would complete Woollahra station and rezone nearby land for new homes. Construction is proposed to begin in 2027 and be completed by 2029.

== History ==
The construction of the Eastern Suburbs Railway was notoriously mired by lengthy delays and cuts. Plans for a station in Woollahra date back to 1915, when state parliament approved plans drawn up by John Bradfield to build the Eastern Suburbs Railway. Construction of the line did not commence at the time due to a lack of funds.

When the Eastern Suburbs Line was under construction in the 1960s and 1970s, the plan was to locate a station in a closed off grass cutting backing onto the backyards of properties on four surrounding streets. It is believed that the cutting had, for many years, been owned and preserved by the then NSW Department of Railways, as a future railway site. Unaware of that, local residents had been using the enclosed grassy cutting as a park. The area, surrounded by the high rocky escarpment that is Edgecliff Road, Woollahra, contained many trees and was a sanctuary for bird life.

In the 1960s, local residents were upset to learn that the cutting would become a railway station, and the only above-ground station on the line. They lobbied the Government of New South Wales vigorously in opposition to the station. In the meantime, construction work on the Eastern Suburbs line was slowing down due to various factors, including the cost blow-out of the project. With the Edgecliff railway station buildings and tunnels built by 1969, and the line to Bondi Junction railway station not scheduled to open until 1979, the residents of Woollahra had plenty of time to organise their opposition to the station.

Despite the basic station infrastructure being constructed, the community campaign, as well as the cost factors surrounding the project, eventually led the Government to abandon the completion of the station. Furthermore, the Government and Railways Department (and then RailCorp), taking into account that the rail lines were within about five metres of suburban backyards, went as far as to install silencing structures around the tracks, which created what is the quietest section of railway track in Australia, with trains gliding on by day and night, emitting only an eerie low hum as they pass through the cutting.

On 24 August 2025, it was announced by the New South Wales government that Woollahra station would be completed and opened to the public in 2029. After premier Chris Minns' plan to redevelop Rosehill Racecourse fell through, he stated the Woollahra development would "rebalance" the development of new housing in Sydney and reorient the focus from West to East. Construction was expected to start in 2027 and to be completed in 2029, at a cost of $200 million. The Liberal Party-controlled Woollahra Council announced its opposition to the development plan and expressed intent to take legal action to block it.

== Current station infrastructure ==
The station itself consists of the concrete foundations of an island platform, which is eight cars long. Only at one end of the site, where electricity substations are housed, does the central platform resemble the other operational stations on the line. The tracks emerge from twin tunnels in a high sandstone wall at the "Edgecliff end" of the abandoned station, indicating that the former grassy park area had been cut out of the natural topography. At the Bondi Junction end, the tracks run beneath a grassy hill sloping down from an adjacent street. At that point, the tunnels are not far beneath the road and residential properties, as they negotiate a slight south-easterly curve.

The abandoned station is surrounded on one side by backyard fences. On the other side, the station is bordered by a large, empty park-like area.

On that side, there is a long, steep, narrow block of vacant land, rising up to Edgecliff Road. The land is between two private properties and is not accessible to the public. Records from the former Department of Railways indicate that was intended to be the location of a lift to the grassy park-like area, which would have been completely landscaped, and would have housed the ticket office, station entry barriers, one or two small retail outlets, and an overhead bridge with stairs down to the platforms. The platforms themselves would have been sheltered, but would not be completely enclosed. Other entry points to the station would have been via an escalator from Edgecliff Road and from Wallaroy Road at the Bondi Junction end.

== Station visibility ==
It is not known if there were plans to resume any of the properties directly adjacent to the tracks for other infrastructure. The abandoned station is fully visible from a small grassy lookout off Edgecliff Road, from which the station and passing trains can be viewed. The mini-CBD skyline of Bondi Junction to the south-east can be seen, and the line's terminus building is also visible from that point.
