= Martin Place railway station =

Railway station in Sydney, New South Wales, Australia

Martin Place
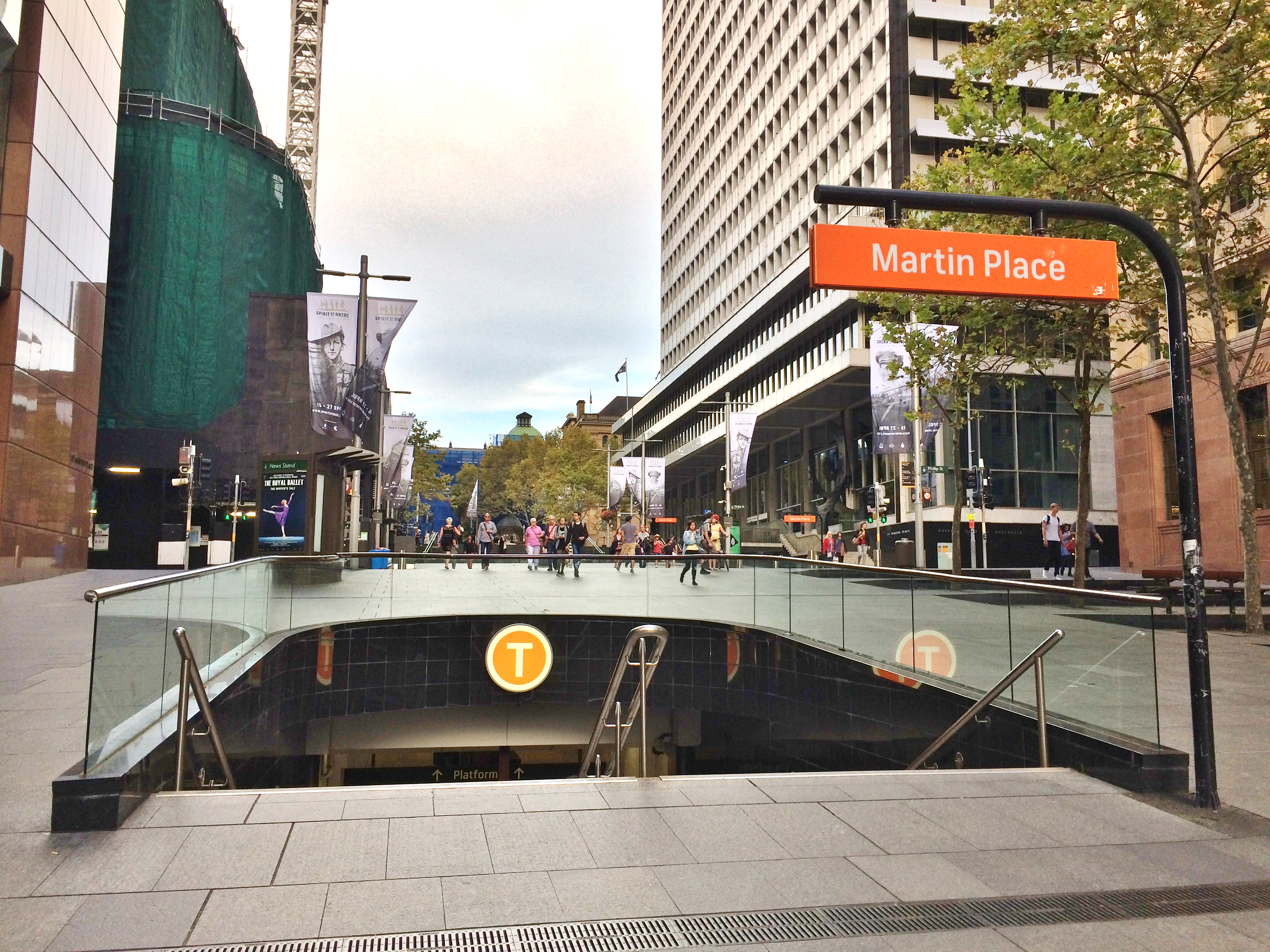
- Elizabeth Street entrance, April 2017

General information
- Location: Martin Place, Sydney central business district, City of Sydney, New South Wales, Australia
- Coordinates: 33°52′04″S 151°12′37″E
- Owner: Transport Asset Manager of New South Wales
- Operator: Sydney Trains; Metro Trains Sydney
- Lines: Eastern Suburbs; Metro North West & Bankstown
- Distance: 2.1 kilometres (1.3 mi) from Central
- Platforms: 4
- Tracks: 4
- Connections: Bus

Construction
- Structure type: Underground
- Platform levels: 2
- Accessible: Yes

Other information
- Status: Staffed
- Station code: MPC
- Website: Transport for NSW

History
- Opened: 23 June 1979 (Eastern Suburbs line); 19 August 2024 (Metro North West & Bankstown Line)

Passengers
- 2025: 21,620,481 (year); 59,234 (daily) (Sydney Trains, Sydney Metro)
- Rank: 5

Services
Preceding station	Sydney Trains	Following station
Town Hall towards Waterfall or Cronulla	T4 Eastern Suburbs & Illawarra Line	Kings Cross towards Bondi Junction
Preceding station	Intercity Trains	Following station
Town Hall towards Kiama	South Coast Line (morning and evening services)	Kings Cross towards Bondi Junction
Preceding station	Sydney Metro	Following station
Barangaroo towards Tallawong	M1 Metro North West & Bankstown Line	Gadigal towards Bankstown

New South Wales Heritage Register
- Official name: Martin Place Railway Station
- Type: State heritage (built)
- Designated: 2 April 1999
- Reference no.: 1187
- Type: Railway Platform / Station
- Category: Transport – Rail
Location

Martin Place railway station is a heritage-listed underground rapid transit and suburban railway station located on the Eastern Suburbs line and the Metro North West & Bankstown Line, serving the Sydney central business district in New South Wales, Australia. Named after Martin Place, it is served by Sydney Trains' T4 Eastern Suburbs & Illawarra Line, NSW TrainLink's South Coast Line and Sydney Metro's M1 Metro North West & Bankstown Line. It was designed by Fowell, Mansfield Jarvis and McLurcan and built from 1973 to 1979. It was added to the New South Wales State Heritage Register on 2 April 1999.

== History ==
Martin Place Station was opened on 23 June 1979 as part of the inauguration of the Eastern Suburbs Railway (ESR) line. The station had been constructed using an open-cut excavation.

=== Eastern Suburbs Railway ===
A line to the eastern suburbs had been part of the wider rail plan for Sydney since the late 1890s, with provisions made for the eventuality during the construction of the City Circle underground stations in the 1920s, although work never proceeded past the planning phase at this time. The City and Suburban Electric Railways (Amendment) Act, Act No. 13 of 1947, made provision for the construction of further electric railways in the City of Sydney, serving the eastern, southern and south-eastern suburbs. This Act amended an earlier scheme proposed by John Bradfield in 1916 which had provided for an eastern suburbs line (via St James Station) and a south-eastern railway. The Act made provision for the construction of 44 miles of new suburban electric railways.

Since the late 1940s the ESR had been under construction on and off, with meaningful progress made from the early 1970s. The construction of the line was a contentious political issue, not only because of the extended period over which it was undertaken, but also because of the resumptions and demolitions throughout Woolloomooloo that were required to build it. The alignment and profile for the ESR was set in 1926 and construction on the railway was started by the NSW Department of Railways. In 1952, the project was abandoned until the mid 1960s. In 1967 the NSW Department of Railways engaged the Snowy Mountains Authority (SMA) to prepare and develop documents for the city tunnels and stations, Kings Cross tunnel and stations, and Rushcutters Bay viaduct and various other associated works.

=== Martin Place Station ===
Martin Place was created in stages between 1860 and 1935 and transformed into a pedestrian area between 1968 and 1978. The final form of the area was determined by prolonged argument and, ultimately, compromise between the City Council, State Government and authorities and private landowners.

By the late 1960s, the conversion of Martin Place into a pedestrian plaza had reached as far east as Pitt Street. In mid 1971, a new plan for the long-term development of the city, known as the Strategic Plan, was published. The second of four principles in this plan involved the improvement of 'access and movement within the city', including pedestrian movement. Included among the 'actions', was the extension of Martin Place as a pedestrian plaza through to Macquarie Street. This extension of the closure to Macquarie Street had long been proposed and objected to by various parties, not the least of whom were the affected property owners. The design of Martin Place Railway Station played an important role in promoting the extension of Martin Place to Macquarie Street and in determining the design of the easternmost end of the plaza.

In 1967, the State Government awarded the contract for the civil and structural design of the line to the Snowy Mountains Hydro-Electric Authority. The section of the line near Macquarie Street was 30 metres below ground level; the main concourse for the proposed Martin Place Station were thus below street level and extended from under Phillip Street as far as Macquarie Street. It was proposed to construct entrances, with escalator access, down to the concourse from both streets. Concurrent to the development of the station, there were proposals to provide underground access from the railway concourse, under Elizabeth Street, to connect with a retail arcade within the Prudential Building on the southern side of Martin Place. The area beneath the roadway between Elizabeth and Castlereagh Streets consisted of basements, owned by the council, which had been constructed for an aborted State Savings Bank building.

Above ground, the design of the Pitt Street-Castlereagh Street block of Martin Place took shape. Taking advantage of the six-metre height difference between the two streets, a raised terrace, overlooking the existing plaza area of Martin Place to the west, was proposed for the Pitt Street end of the block. At the Castlereagh Street end, it was proposed to build a sunken amphitheatre for civic and public performances, from which access under Castlereagh Street would lead via a shopping arcade into the City owned basements to the railway concourse. This vital link was opposed for sometime and would be the last element in the overall plan to be constructed (see below). Varied uses for the plaza above were proposed. The short block between Castlereagh and Elizabeth Street was considered suitable for markets and the area between Elizabeth and Phillip Street was to be a quiet landscaped haven. The final section, between Phillip and Macquarie Streets, was to be an important place of arrival in the city centre. A large fountain was proposed to provide a focal point for the vista towards Sydney Hospital and it was envisaged that outdoor café seating would make this area a good waiting area near the railway entrance.

The Minister for Lands gave notice of the closure of Martin Place from the eastern side of Pitt Street to the western side of Macquarie Street, exclusive of cross streets, on 24 November 1972. Almost every Government Agency and owner objected, resulting in prolonged negotiations. The objector who could not be satisfied was the Chairman of the Rural Bank, who used his high level contacts to ensure that the plaza, as first gazetted, extended only as far as Elizabeth Street, stopping short of the Rural Bank (1973). In reality, the upper two blocks were closed for a number of years to through traffic to allow railway construction, ultimately paving the way for permanent closure. The objections of the Rural Bank were finally overcome in 1974. It had always been the Railway's intention to build an entrance to the station in the corner of the Rural Bank Building because there was no room on the footpath. This entrance could be moved into the plaza, if created, a clear incentive for the Rural Bank's co-operation. The design of for the upper two blocks of Martin Place were finalised during 1975.

The design of the middle block between Castlereagh and Elizabeth Streets had, meanwhile, been held up by a number of considerations, partially connected to the railway. It was not clear if the concourse of the railway station would extend beyond the eastern side of Elizabeth Street. Secondly, it was a condition of consent for the MLC Centre, then under construction, that a subway be built under Castlereagh Street to connect the building to the station. Thirdly, the lessee of the old basements of the aborted State Savings Building, Prudential Insurance Company, were reluctant to surrender their lease to Council "The architects were trying to bring all these issues together so that the MLC tunnel under Castlereagh Street would connect into a naturally lit shopping arcade in the basements and then join under Elizabeth Street to the railway concourse. If this was realised there would be an undercover connection from the amphitheatre on the western side of Castlereagh Street to the railway concourse".

These issues took years to resolve; this section of Martin Place would be the last to be built. The Eastern Suburbs Railway line officially opened in 1979. Although originally proposed to extend southwards into Randwick, the line was only built to Bondi Junction. The shopping arcade and connection to the railway station was not made until 1982.

The design by Fowell Mansfield Jarvis & Maclurcan Pty Ltd was awarded a public buildings merit award by the Royal Australian Institute of Architects in 1979. Each station on the Eastern Suburbs Railway had a different colour to identify it. Bright red was used throughout Martin Place in both glazed tiles for walls and columns and painted cement surfaces. The red was chosen to reflect the banking and finance associations of the area. The design of the ESR underground stations continued the design ideas of the city underground stations of the 1920s, with individual station colours and features.

In 2010, work commenced on an upgrade to the station, consisting of two lifts and an accessible toilet. The upgrade was completed in April 2011.

As part of the Sydney Metro City & Southwest project, a further two platforms opened in August 2024, as well as the Muru Giligu walkway ("path of light") to the Hunter Street exit.

== Station configuration ==
The station is entirely below ground. A concourse serving Sydney Trains services opened in 1979 is accessed via stairs from Martin Place and then banks of three escalators to the concourse level. Pedestrian access is via arcades constructed at the same time as the station and leading to adjacent office and retail plazas. The ceiling of the public concourse above the platforms is raked following the topography of the street above and the supporting concrete beams are painted red to match the feature ceramic wall tiling, also in red.

Two new entrances were opened in 2024 to serve Sydney Metro, located on Hunter Street and Castlereigh Street. The Castlereigh Street entrance contains a retail plaza, and a pedestrian tunnel under Elizabeth Street towards the existing Sydney Trains concourse.

The station consists of four platforms. Platforms 1 and 2 are an island platform with two faces serving the T4 Eastern Suburbs & Illawarra Line and South Coast Line. The platform is accessed via two sets of three escalators. The station and platforms are constructed of reinforced concrete finished with pre-cast white terrazzo panels, and red glazed ceramic wall tiles. A turnback siding is located east of the station. Platforms 3 and 4 were opened in August 2024 as part of the Sydney Metro City & Southwest project as two single-faced island platforms on either side of a large concourse, serving the Northwest & Bankstown Line. A pedestrian tunnel links platforms 1 & 2 to the concourse between platforms 3 & 4.

A service tunnel extends from Martin Place railway station under Sydney Hospital into The Domain. The tunnel carries air conditioning services from an underground room, which is located beneath two ventilation towers in The Domain, by the side of the road behind Sydney Hospital.

== Platforms and services ==
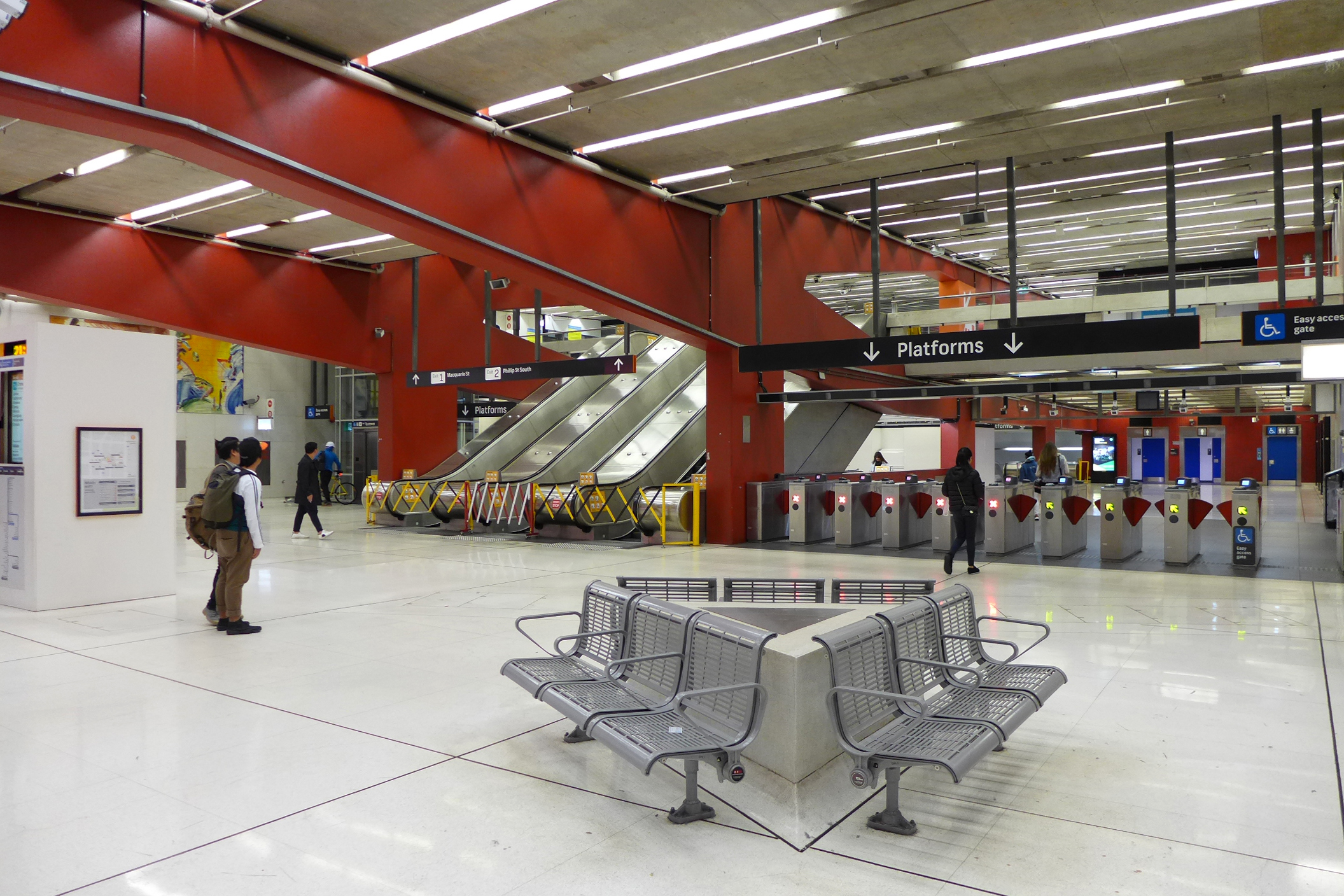
Sydney Trains concourse, August 2017

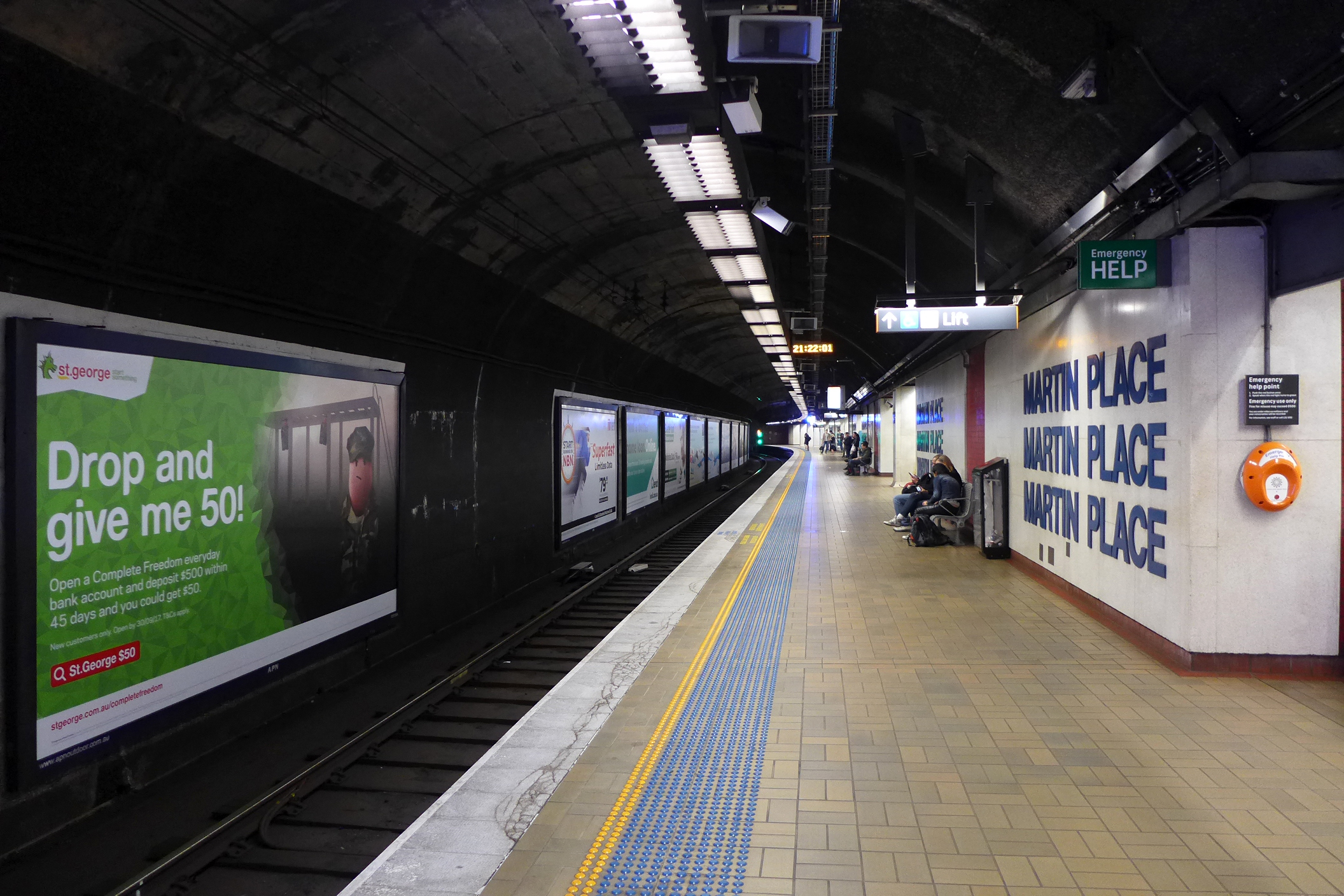
Platform 1 (Sydney Trains), August 2017

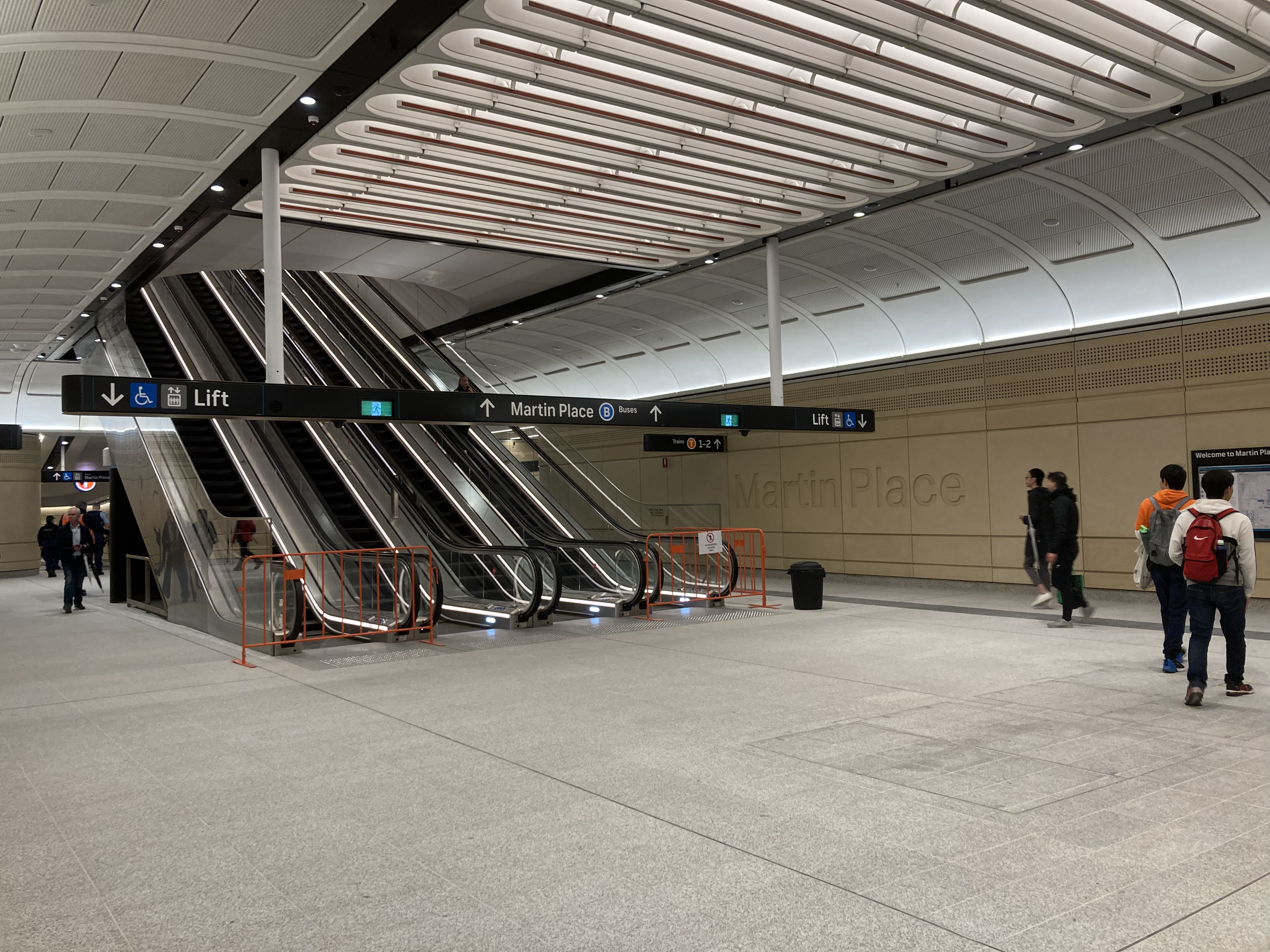
Sydney Metro concourse, May 2024

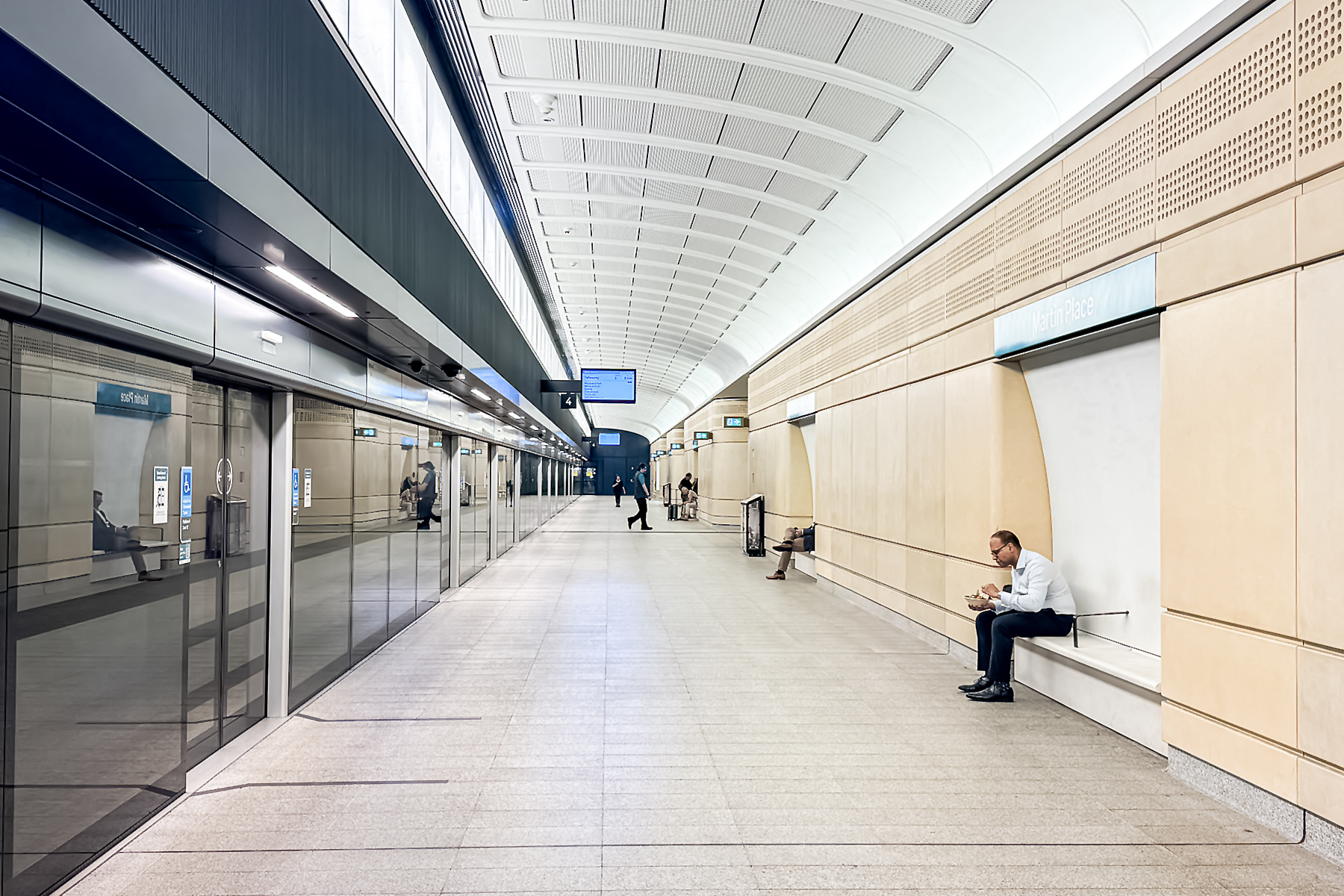
Platform 4 (Sydney Metro), March 2025

Platform	Line	Stopping pattern	Notes
1	T4 Eastern Suburbs & Illawarra Line	services to Cronulla, Waterfall & Helensburgh	
1	South Coast Line	services to Wollongong, Dapto & Kiama	3 weekday early morning services to Kiama commence here
2	T4 Eastern Suburbs & Illawarra Line	services to Bondi Junction	
2	South Coast Line	services to Bondi Junction	3 weekday early morning services from Kiama terminate here
3	M1 Metro North West & Bankstown Line	Metro services to Bankstown	
4	M1 Metro North West & Bankstown Line	Metro services to Tallawong	

== Heritage listing ==
As at 6 October 2015, Martin Place underground railway station is significant as a representative of the latest major railway construction undertaken in the State in the eastern suburbs railway line. The whole of the structure being underground is a development of the structures built in the city in the 1930s and represents the latest in technology at the time. Martin Place Railway Station is significant as the only underground railway station constructed in the centre of the city within the last fifty years. It is a good example of a Late Twentieth-Century International style structure which is highly intact with many of its original materials and finishes still in place. Its design by architects Fowell Mansfield Jarvis & Maclurcan Pty Ltd was awarded a public buildings merit award by the Royal Australian Institute of Architects in 1979.

Martin Place railway station was listed on the New South Wales State Heritage Register on 2 April 1999 having satisfied the following criteria.

== Trackplan ==
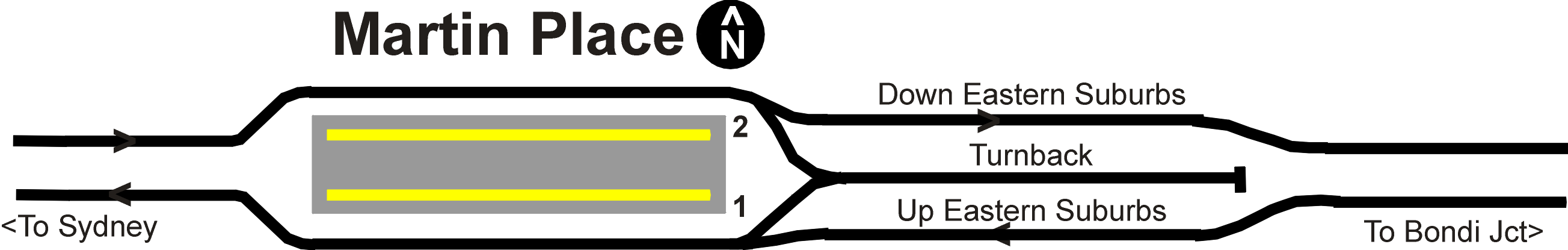
Track layout (Eastern Suburbs line)

== See also ==
- Architecture of Sydney
- List of Sydney Trains railway stations
- Railways in Sydney
- Rail transport in New South Wales
- Sydney underground railways
