= Eastern Suburbs railway line =

Railway line in Sydney, New South Wales

Eastern Suburbs Line
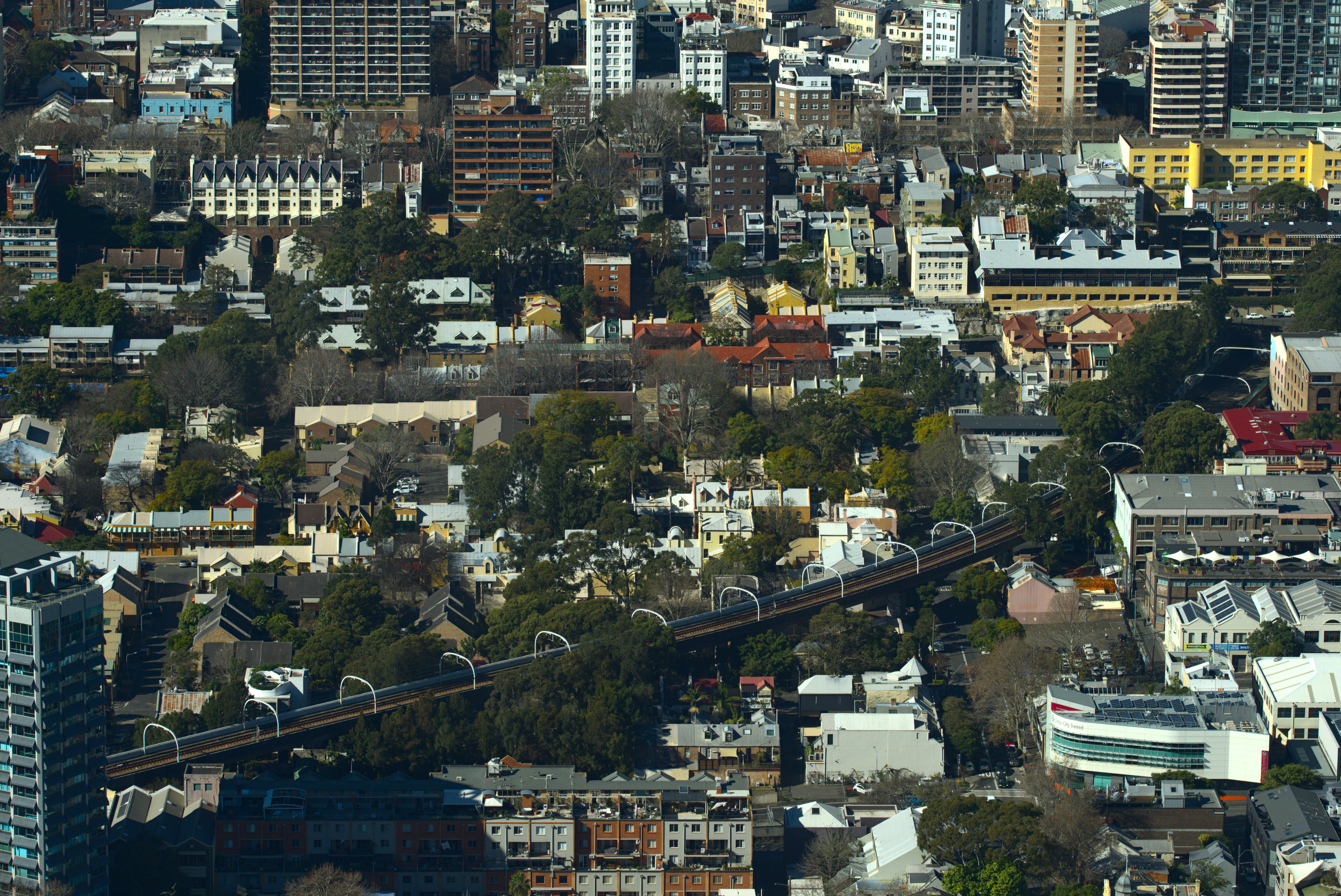
- Aerial view of the viaduct across Woolloomooloo

Overview
- Owner: Transport Asset Manager of New South Wales
- Termini: Redfern; Bondi Junction
- Stations: 7

Service
- Services: Eastern Suburbs & Illawarra Line; South Coast Line
- Operator: Sydney Trains

History
- Opened: 23 June 1979

Technical
- Track length: 7 km
- Track gauge: 1,435 mm (4 ft 8 1/2 in) standard gauge

The Eastern Suburbs Railway (ESR) is a commuter railway line in Sydney constructed in the 1970s. It is operated by Sydney Trains and has stations at Martin Place, Kings Cross, Edgecliff and Bondi Junction. In addition, it has dedicated platforms at Town Hall, Central and Redfern stations. All of these stations are underground. The Eastern Suburbs railway connects with the Illawarra line at Erskineville, forming the Eastern Suburbs & Illawarra Line. The line features turnbacks at Central, Martin Place and Bondi Junction. There was also previously a rarely used cross-over at Edgecliff. It operates a service every 3 to 5 minutes during weekday peak hours and 8 to 10 minutes at all other times.

== Design ==
The Eastern Suburbs line is shown in blue. Proposed extensions are shown as dotted lines. Unbuilt or incomplete stations are shown in brackets.

The twin-track Eastern Suburbs line consists of eight stations connected mainly by viaduct and tunnel. The stations are finished in terrazzo and colourful tiles.

=== Alignment ===
From a tunnel portal north of Erskineville, the Eastern Suburbs line runs north to Redfern, then Central. The line then heads north-west to Town Hall, then east to Martin Place before emerging near the Art Gallery of New South Wales onto a viaduct across the suburb of Woolloomooloo. The line goes back underground at Kings Cross, before emerging onto a viaduct across Rushcutters Bay. The line goes back underground at Edgecliff, then heads south-east through tunnel to emerge at a cutting in Woollahra, the site of a vestigial station. The lines go back underground at Bondi Junction.

== History ==
Proposals for a line to the Eastern Suburbs of Sydney had first been associated with demands in the 1860s that the railway be extended into Sydney's city, rather than terminating at the original Sydney station on the south of city. However, priorities in connecting country areas, and the high cost of a city railway meant that such plans were put aside. In the 1880s, the population of the Eastern Suburbs was small, and a railway would not have been viable. Successive Royal Commissions in 1890 & 1896 recommended a railway be built into the city, with the provision for an Eastern Suburbs extension, but both requests were ignored. Preference at the time, however, was for tramway construction: The Tramways Extension Bill 1880 was passed in 1880 and the tramway network in the Eastern Suburbs spread rapidly, reaching Bondi Beach in 1894, Rose Bay in 1898 and Watsons Bay in 1909. Two other tram lines were also built to Randwick.

=== Bradfield's plans ===
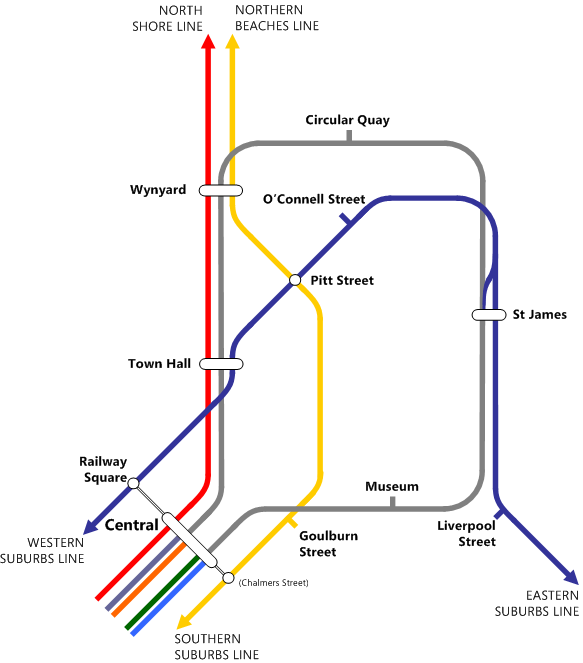
The original railway network for the Sydney CBD planned by John Bradfield. The Eastern Suburbs line is drawn in blue.

The Eastern Suburbs Railway was a part of engineer Dr John Bradfield's scheme for Sydney's railways (the Bradfield Scheme). The alignment and profile for the line was set in 1926 and construction on the railway was started by the NSW Department of Railways. Construction commenced with the building of stub tunnels at St James station. These tunnels ran southward from St James rising to clear the City Circle lines and turned east towards the Eastern Suburbs. They then halted pending further construction after the completion of the railway from Central to St James and Wynyard.

The railway was planned to continue approximately parallel to Oxford Street to Bondi Junction. However, the intervention of the Great Depression and World War II halted construction on all Bradfield's plans including the Eastern Suburbs Railway causing its abandonment.

=== The 1947 plan ===
Post War, the construction of the railway returned to government agenda. Two lines would be built: one proceeding on a viaduct out to Kings Cross, then eventually to Bondi Beach. Another line would head from St James via Taylor Square and the Sydney Cricket Ground, extending to Kingsford, with a proposal to extend from Taylor Square to Coogee.

The City and Suburban Electric Railways (Amendment) Act, Act No. 13 of 1947, made provision for the construction of further electric railways in the City of Sydney, serving the eastern, southern and south eastern suburbs. This Act amended the earlier scheme proposed by Bradfield in 1916, which had provided for the previous construction work. The City and Suburban Electric Railways (Amendment) Act of 1947 made provision for the construction of 44 miles (71 km) of new suburban electric railways. New construction was carried out including the construction of four underground platforms beside Central Station at Chalmers Street (only two would be used for the Eastern Suburbs line, the other two would be used for the Southern Suburbs line). These works were a diversion from Bradfield's plan which had trains emanating from St James not Central. Further, instead of running parallel to Oxford Street, the line would run via Kings Cross to Bondi Junction. The second stage of works would extend the line through North Bondi (Muriverie Road Station) and Rose Bay (Dover Road Station).

Construction commenced in late 1951 on sites around Central and Redfern stations with preliminary railway tunnels blasted 27 metres (90 ft) below Martin Place but ceased in 1952 due to a recession. Works on the four platforms at Central was approximately 30% completed when the project was abandoned again. The project was not revived until the mid-1960s.

=== The 1967 plan ===
In 1967, the New South Wales Government awarded the contract for the civil and structural design of the entire line to the Snowy Mountains Hydro-electric Authority (SMA), the federal government agency responsible for the design and construction of the Snowy Mountains Scheme in south-eastern Australia. The line was planned to run to Bondi Junction via Kings Cross, as planned in 1947, but then continue to Kingsford via Randwick and the University of New South Wales. Various station options were considered including a station at Rushcutters Bay, but the final conclusion was the line would run Central (by finishing the incomplete platforms), Town Hall (making use of two hitherto unutilised platforms), Martin Place, Kings Cross, Edgecliff, Woollahra, Bondi Junction, Charing Cross, Frenchmans Road, Randwick Junction, University of New South Wales and Kingsford (Nine Ways).

Terrain factors caused the line to be composed of dual single-bore tunnels and have two significant twin track concrete viaduct structures at Woolloomooloo and Rushcutters Bay. The route from Bondi Junction to Kingsford was selected, primarily because of the ease of tunneling through sandstone along the high topological ridgeline that runs from the existing terminus at the Junction, via Waverley, northern Randwick, Randwick Junction and to the eastern side of the University of New South Wales. The intended terminus at Kingsford, where the terrain drops closer to sea level, may have been an above ground station with potential for stabling yards on then government-owned land near the suburb of Daceyville.

To reduce costs and more effectively stage the project, the line was curtailed to Bondi Junction (original plans suggested Edgecliff, but Bondi Junction provided a better option for patronage and road congestion relief reasons). Further, only a single-track connection would be made to the existing Sydney network at Erskineville, with provision for double-tracking at a later stage (along with a new underground platforms at Redfern).

The final contract for the line involved approximately 10 kilometres (6.2 mi) of single track tunnel structures and crossovers, four underground stations (Martin Place, Kings Cross, Edgecliff and Bondi Junction; Town Hall already existed and Central was partially complete) and one surface station (Woollahra, in a cutting), two 772-metre (2,533 ft) concrete viaducts and a further 800 metres (2,600 ft) of surface works. At Kings Cross a road tunnel bypass of the commercial centre would be constructed coincidentally.

=== 1976 review ===
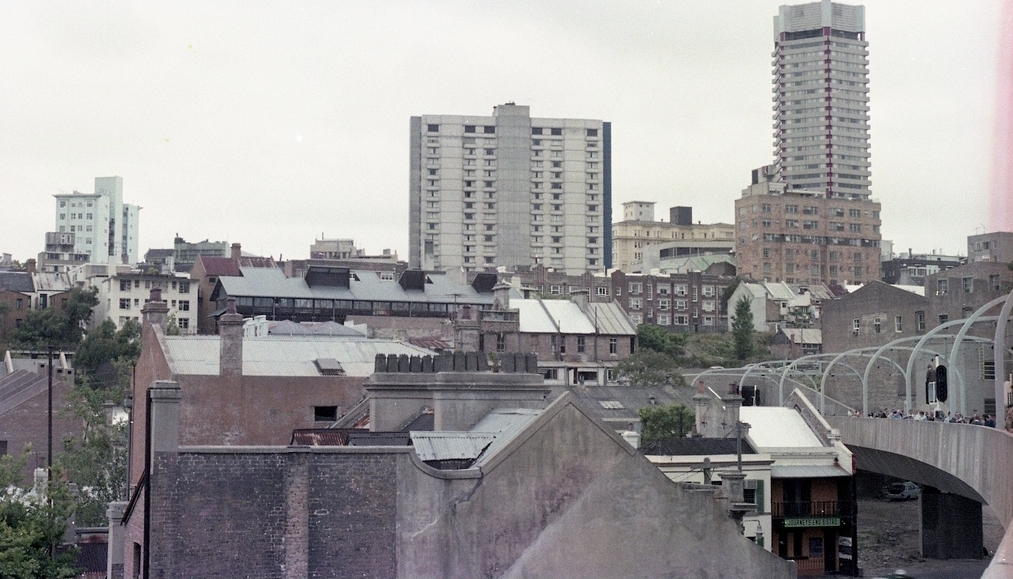
Eastern suburbs railway, 1978

Work progressed slowly and at significant expense. Industrial action spurred by ethnic tensions delayed the works, as did an injunction taken out by residents of the exclusive suburb of Woollahra to prevent round-the-clock tunnelling works, spawning a chain of legal action that culminated in the High Court of Australia three years after construction finished in 1979. When the Wran government came to power in May 1976, a Board of Review of the Legislative Assembly was set up to examine the merits and feasibility of the Eastern Suburbs Railway project. All tunnelling works had been completed to Bondi Junction and much of the track was laid, but the stations were mostly incomplete. The Board was asked primarily whether the project continue or be abandoned yet again. The Board made the following recommendations:

- The line be completed and opened to Bondi Junction
- The line be abandoned beyond Bondi Junction
- Stations be scaled back: the report suggested inter alia no shopping plaza be constructed at Bondi Junction as planned (Martin Place, being further advanced, should retain its shopping plaza), the number of escalators be reduced, platforms be tiled only four carriage lengths as only four carriage trains would be used at opening, and that the size, scale and finish of bus-rail interchanges at Bondi Junction and Edgecliff be reduced
- New work be commissioned to integrate the line to the existing Illawarra line, including: constructing a second track from Central to Erskineville, underground platforms at Redfern station and a turnback tunnel (for trains coming from the Illawarra Line) at Martin Place

The recommendations were almost entirely accepted: the line would be truncated to Bondi Junction (but platforms would be tiled their full length). Further, due to residents' demands, costs and poor patronage expectations, Woollahra station would not be completed (there remains a vestigial station on site, with platform walls in place). Lastly, it was decided to build the Bondi Junction Bypass section of the Eastern Suburbs Freeway (a road otherwise unbuilt), now Syd Einfeld Drive.

=== Opening ===
The Eastern Suburbs line was finally opened on 23 June 1979 by then-New South Wales premier Neville Wran around 50 years after it was first planned and 31 years after construction began – construction had taken place at a rate of approximately 250 metres per year on average. Only double-deck rolling stock was used on the line – the first line in Sydney to become all double-deck. When opened, the integration with the rest of the Sydney network (announced as a result of the 1976 report) had not been completed, so the line operated as a short-lived self-contained shuttle service between Central and Bondi Junction at five-minute frequencies during the day and peak. The additional works were completed for the 1980 timetable change integrating the line into the Illawarra line, thus helping to relieve congestion by removing Illawarra line services from the City Circle.

The new stations on the line were equipped with magnetic stripe ticketing and turnstiles, but that technology was not extended to the remainder of the network, leaving the majority of stations within the suburban network issuing Edmondson tickets. This situation did not change until both ticketing systems were replaced by the Automated Ticketing System in 1992–1993.

Bondi Junction had originally been intended only as an intermediate turnback station before the extension to Kingsford was abandoned. In 1990, the land set aside for this extension in Randwick and Kingsford was sold.

As part of the Rail Clearways Program, the $77 million Bondi Junction Turnback project saw a new rail crossover built between the single-track tunnels, enabling 20 trains an hour, up from 14, to use the station. The small number of services which ran from the Illawarra Line onto the City Circle were also transferred onto the Eastern Suburbs Line at this time. The work was completed in time for the introduction of a new timetable on 28 May 2006.

=== Bondi Beach railway ===
In 1999, a private proposal to extend the railway to Bondi Beach at a cost of $197 million received backing from the Federal Government but the scheme did not go ahead. The project proposed to extend the Eastern Suburbs Railway from its current terminus at Bondi Junction to a new underground station at Bondi Beach. The Bondi Beach Railway Company, owned by Lendlease and Macquarie Bank, proposed to build and maintain the railway and to operate it for a 30-year term. The physical works involved the extension eastwards of the existing tunnels at Bondi Junction with the construction of a new 2.6-kilometre (1.6 mi) single-track tunnel to the proposed Bondi Beach station site under South Bondi Park.

Local residents opposed several aspects of the project, including the site chosen for the station, the impact on bus services and the proposed station use fare surcharge. When the Airport Link Company, the operator of the Airport line, went into receivership due to low patronage in 2000, interest in constructing the Bondi Beach extension collapsed. In 2001, the government rejected the proposed extension to Bondi Beach as a public-private partnership.

=== Woollahra Station Plans ===
In July 2025, after the state government failed to acquire Rosehill Racecourse to build apartments and a metro station, a report commissioned by Premier Chris Minns found the site around Woollahra station feasible for rezoning and new housing developments. On 24 August 2025, the state government announced plans to complete and open Woollahra station and redevelop the surrounding area to create 10,000 new homes. The station is expected to be open by 2029.

== Engineering heritage ==
The railway line received an Engineering Heritage Plaque award from Engineers Australia as part of its Engineering Heritage Recognition Program.
