= Bondi Junction railway station =

Railway station in Sydney, New South Wales, Australia

Bondi Junction
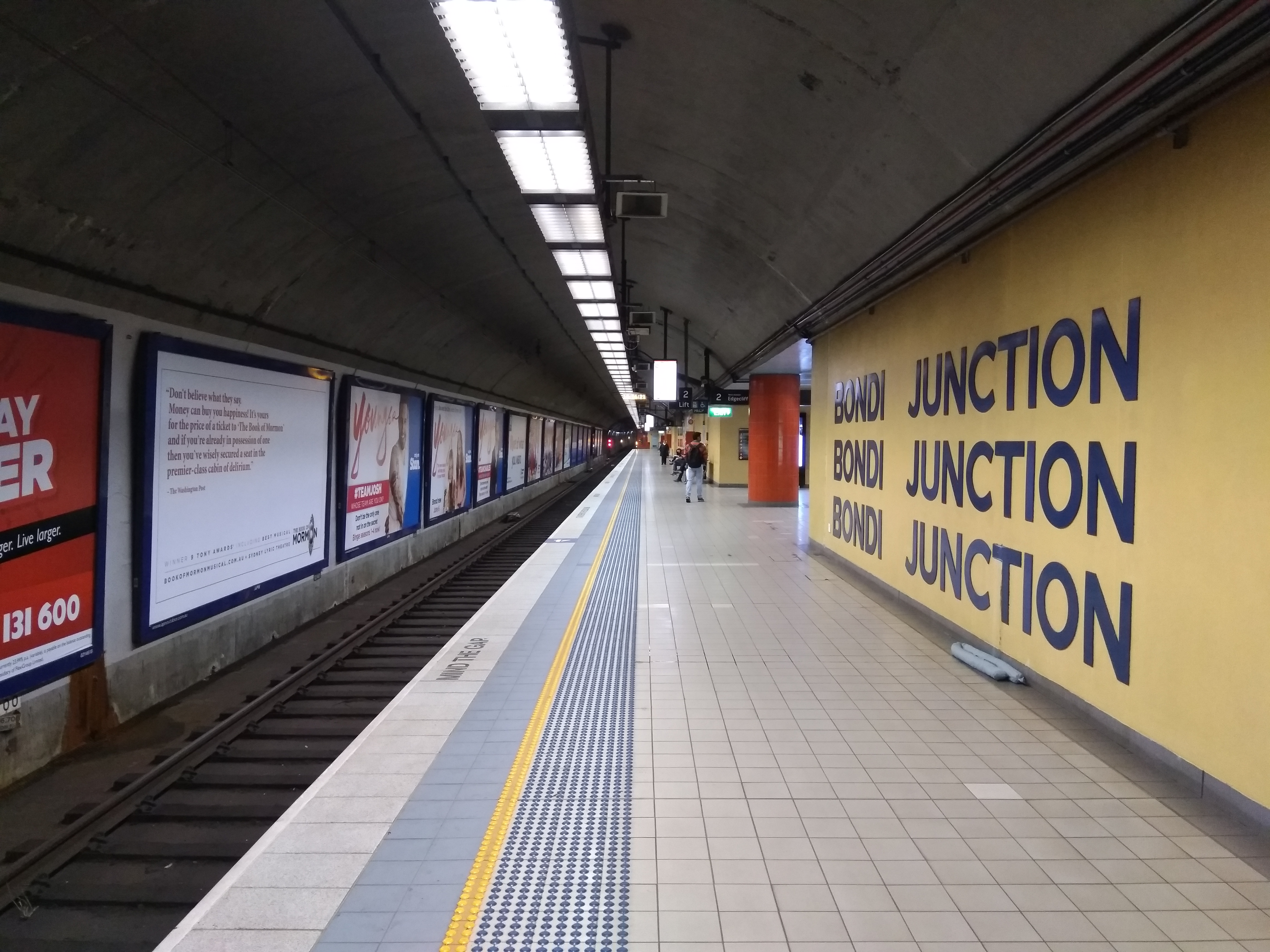
- Bondi Junction platform terminus, June 2018

General information
- Location: Grafton Street, Bondi Junction; Sydney, New South Wales; Australia
- Coordinates: 33°53′28″S 151°14′50″E
- Elevation: 64 metres (210 ft)
- Owner: Transport Asset Manager of NSW
- Operator: Sydney Trains
- Line: Eastern Suburbs
- Distance: 6.76 km (4.20 mi) from Central
- Platforms: 2 (1 island)
- Tracks: 2
- Connections: Bus

Construction
- Structure type: Underground
- Accessible: Yes

Other information
- Status: Weekdays: Staffed: 24/7: Weekends and public holidays: Staffed: 24/7
- Station code: BJN
- Website: Transport for NSW

History
- Opened: 23 June 1979 (47 years ago)
- Electrified: Yes (from opening)

Passengers
- 2025: 12,945,691 (year); 35,468 (daily) (Sydney Trains)
- Rank: 10

Services
Preceding station	Sydney Trains	Following station
Edgecliff towards Waterfall or Cronulla	Eastern Suburbs & Illawarra Line	Terminus
Preceding station	Intercity Trains	Following station
Edgecliff towards Kiama	South Coast Line (morning and evening services)	Terminus
Proposed services
Preceding station	Sydney Trains	Following station
Woollahra towards Waterfall or Cronulla	Eastern Suburbs & Illawarra Line	Terminus
Location

Bondi Junction railway station is a suburban railway station located on the Eastern Suburbs line, serving the Sydney suburb of Bondi Junction. It is served by Sydney Trains T4 Eastern Suburbs & Illawarra Line services and intercity South Coast Line services.

== History ==
Bondi Junction track layout

As a long-standing major commercial area in Sydney's east, a railway line had long been considered to Bondi Junction. The suburb was variously proposed to have been the intermediate or the ultimate terminus of an Eastern Suburbs Railway since 1916. In 1967, tenders were awarded for the construction of the Eastern Suburbs line as far as Bondi Junction. Construction began shortly thereafter.

=== Construction plans ===
Although a subway station, construction required the demolition of a block of mixed commercial-residential buildings to permit staging of the project, the construction of a works compound and, once the railway was completed, to be the location of the bus interchange facility.

The line was to be eventually constructed to Kingsford, but the first stage would run only so far as Bondi Junction. As the planned interim terminus of the line, terminus facilities were provided at the station. These consisted of a turnback tunnel between the main running tunnels and a trailing crossover.

An underground shopping complex was proposed to be constructed at the concourse level of the station (similar to that which exists at Martin Place). Additionally, an underground walkway would be provided to the then proposed (later constructed) Bondi Junction Plaza shopping centre.

=== Construction realities ===
Construction of the Eastern Suburbs Railway generally proceeded from the Erskineville tunnel portals to Bondi Junction. As such Bondi Junction was the last developed station site.

In 1976, the Wran Government sought to reduce costs on the railway's construction. As a result of an inquiry by an Eastern Suburbs Railway Board of Review, a number of recommendations were made and accepted by the government. Relevantly these included:

- Eastern Suburbs Railway not be constructed beyond Bondi Junction and the route to Kingsford be abandoned
- Line be fully integrated with the Illawarra line (not be run independently)
- Shopping centre on the station concourse not be constructed
- Tunnel to the Bondi Junction Plaza not be constructed
- Level of finish at the station be reduced and only four escalators be provided from the concourse level to the platform level
- Scale of the bus interchange be reduced

As a result of these changes, Bondi Junction became the permanent terminus of the Eastern Suburbs and Illawarra railway lines. However no provision was made for an upgraded turnback facility.

=== Opening ===
The Eastern Suburbs Railway was opened on 23 June 1979 by the Premier, Neville Wran.

=== Rebuilding the bus interchange ===
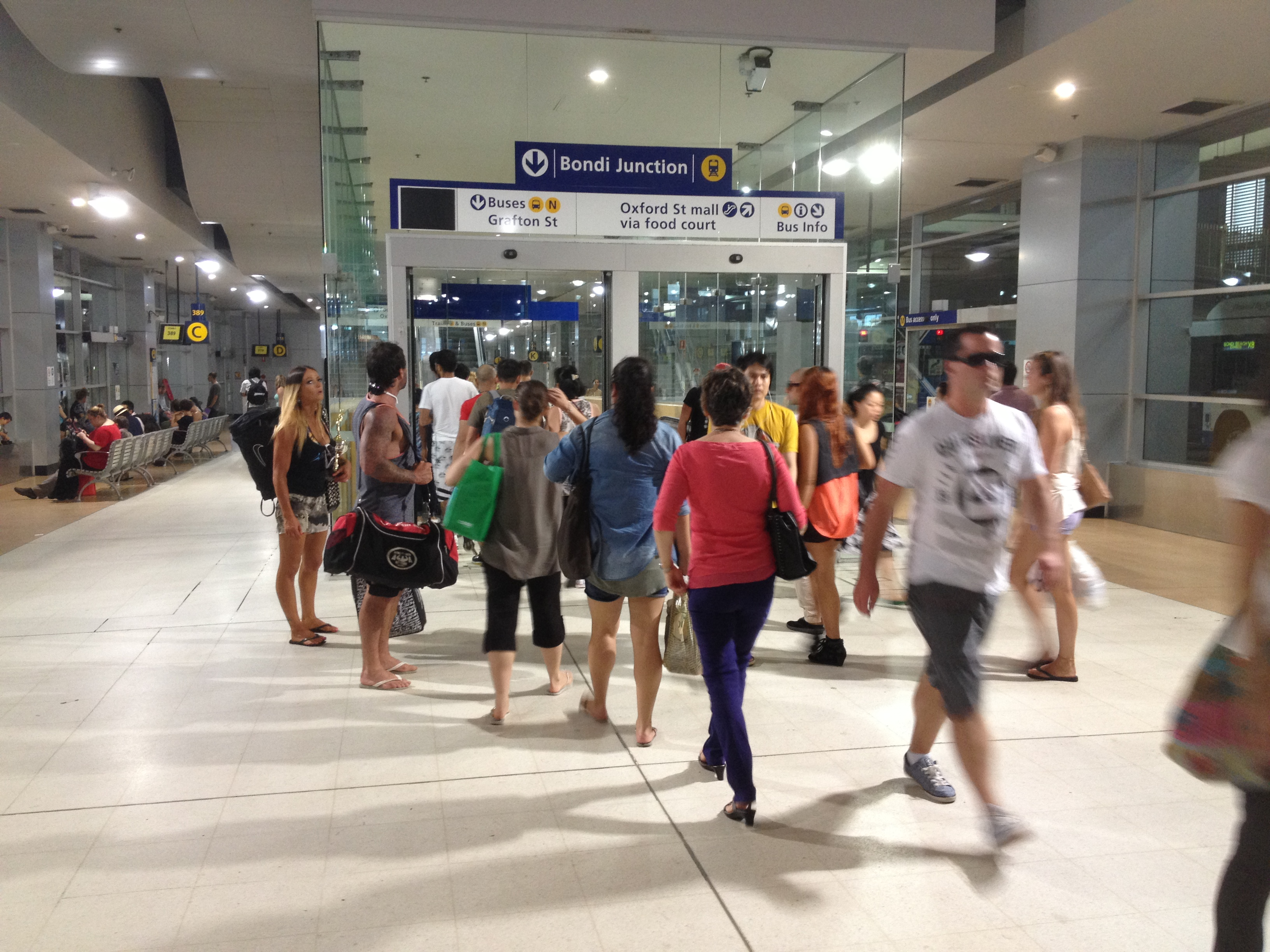
Entrance to the station concourse from the bus interchange

The bus interchange facility opened in 1979 was basic. The location of the station meant the land and airspace on which it was located was highly valuable. This in turn led to various proposal throughout the 1990s to sell the airspace and redevelop the interchange. In 1998, Woollahra Council, then controlling the site of the bus interchange, finalised an agreement to sell the airspace above the site to Meriton who commenced construction of a new bus interchange together with two residential apartment towers and a small shopping centre in April 1999. The new interchange was temporarily opened in September 2000 for the Sydney Olympics but subsequently closed for further work. The new bus interchange, two apartment towers and the shopping centre opened in July 2001. The shopping centre known as Tiffany Plaza (renamed to Meriton Retail Precinct Bondi Junction in 2018) featured a McDonald's outlet, a gym, a child care centre and seven other retailers.

Reconstruction of the bus terminal altered the locations of commuter access to the station concourse. As such, alterations were required to the station concourse. The resulting renovation of Bondi Junction station primarily involved upgrading station staff facilities, the installation of toilets and the general updating of the station, hitherto a time capsule to the 1970s.

The renovation was conducted coincidentally with the Easy Access upgrade to the station and the replacement of the original incandescent lamp platform indicators with plasma display indicators.

=== Clearways Project upgrade ===
Constructed as a part of the Rail Clearways Program, a second turnback facility was built. The major work consisted of the construction of a new crossover tunnel on the city side of the station. This created an X-shaped or diamond junction allowing terminating trains to arrive at either platform. The changes allowed the full line capacity of 20 trains per hour to be turned at Bondi Junction, the prior limit being 14.

In addition, extra stabling facilities were provided by utilitising unused sections of tunnels beyond the station. These tunnels were constructed on anticipation of continued tunnelling towards Kingsford. They have had track laid and overhead wire installed for a length of two eight-car trains in each tunnel. This gives a total stabling capacity of five eight-car trains (two in each siding and one in the turnback tunnel).

Complementing the stabling capacity at the station is the erection of a staff meal and waiting room on the platform level.

Construction began on the site in October 2004 while the station was closed and trains terminated at Edgecliff. Commissioning took place in April 2006.

== Services ==
=== Platforms ===
Platform	Line	Stopping pattern	Notes
1	Eastern Suburbs & Illawarra Line	terminating services to & from Cronulla, Waterfall & Helensburgh	
1	South Coast Line	terminating services to & from Wollongong, Port Kembla, Dapto & Kiama	only during peak hours and weekends
2	Eastern Suburbs & Illawarra Line	starting services to & from Cronulla, Waterfall & Helensburgh	
2	South Coast Line	starting services to & from Wollongong, Port Kembla, Dapto & Kiama	only during peak hours and weekends

=== Transport links ===
Bondi Junction Interchange: All bus routes are operated by Transdev John Holland except routes 389 and 440 which are operated by Transit Systems.

Stand A:
- 333: North Bondi

Stand B:

- 380: Watsons Bay
- 381: Tamarama

Stand C:

- 386: Vaucluse
- 387: South Head Cemetery

Stand D:

- 379: North Bondi

Stand E:

- Arrivals only

Stand F:

- 313: Coogee via Randwick
- 350: Sydney Airport via Clovelly, Coogee, Maroubra, Eastgardens and Mascot

Stand G:

- Arrivals only

Stand H:

- 326: Edgecliff station
- 327: Edgecliff station
- 328: Darling Point

Stand J:

- 356: Westfield Eastgardens via Maroubra Junction
- 360: North Clovelly

Stand K:

- 379: Bronte Beach

Stand L:

- 390X: La Perouse via Randwick Junction

Stand M:

- School services only

Stand N:

- Arrivals only

Stand P:

- Arrivals only

Stand Q:

- Arrivals only

Stand R (Grafton Street):

- 333: Circular Quay
- 352: Marrickville Metro via Taylor Square
- 355: Marrickville Metro via Waterloo
- 389: Australian National Maritime Museum

Stand S (Grafton Street):

- Arrivals only

Stand T (Grafton Street):

- 440: Rozelle
