= Overthorpe =

Overthorpe may refer to:

- Overthorpe, Northamptonshire, England, a village and civil parish
- Overthorpe, West Yorkshire, England, an area of Thornhill
- Overthorpe, Double Bay, New South Wales, Australia, a residential complex
