= Municipality of Woollahra =

Woollahra Municipal Council
- Local government area
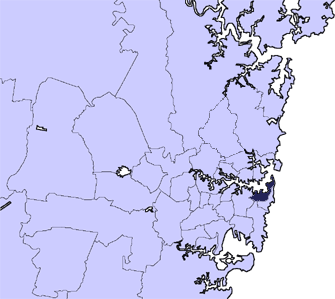
- Location in Metropolitan Sydney

- Interactive map of Woollahra Municipal Council
- Coordinates: 33°53′S 151°15′E
- Country: Australia
- State: New South Wales
- Region: Metropolitan Sydney
- Established: April 1860
- Council seat: Redleaf

Government
  - Mayor: Sarah Dixson
  - State electorates: Vaucluse; Sydney
  - Federal division: Wentworth

Area
  - Total: 12 km^{2} (4.6 sq mi)

Population
  - Total: 53,496 (2021 census)
  - Density: 4,460/km^{2} (11,500/sq mi)
- Website: Woollahra Municipal Council
LGAs around Woollahra Municipal Council
| Sydney Harbour | Sydney Harbour | Tasman Sea |
| Sydney | Woollahra Municipal Council | Waverley |
| Sydney | Randwick | Waverley |

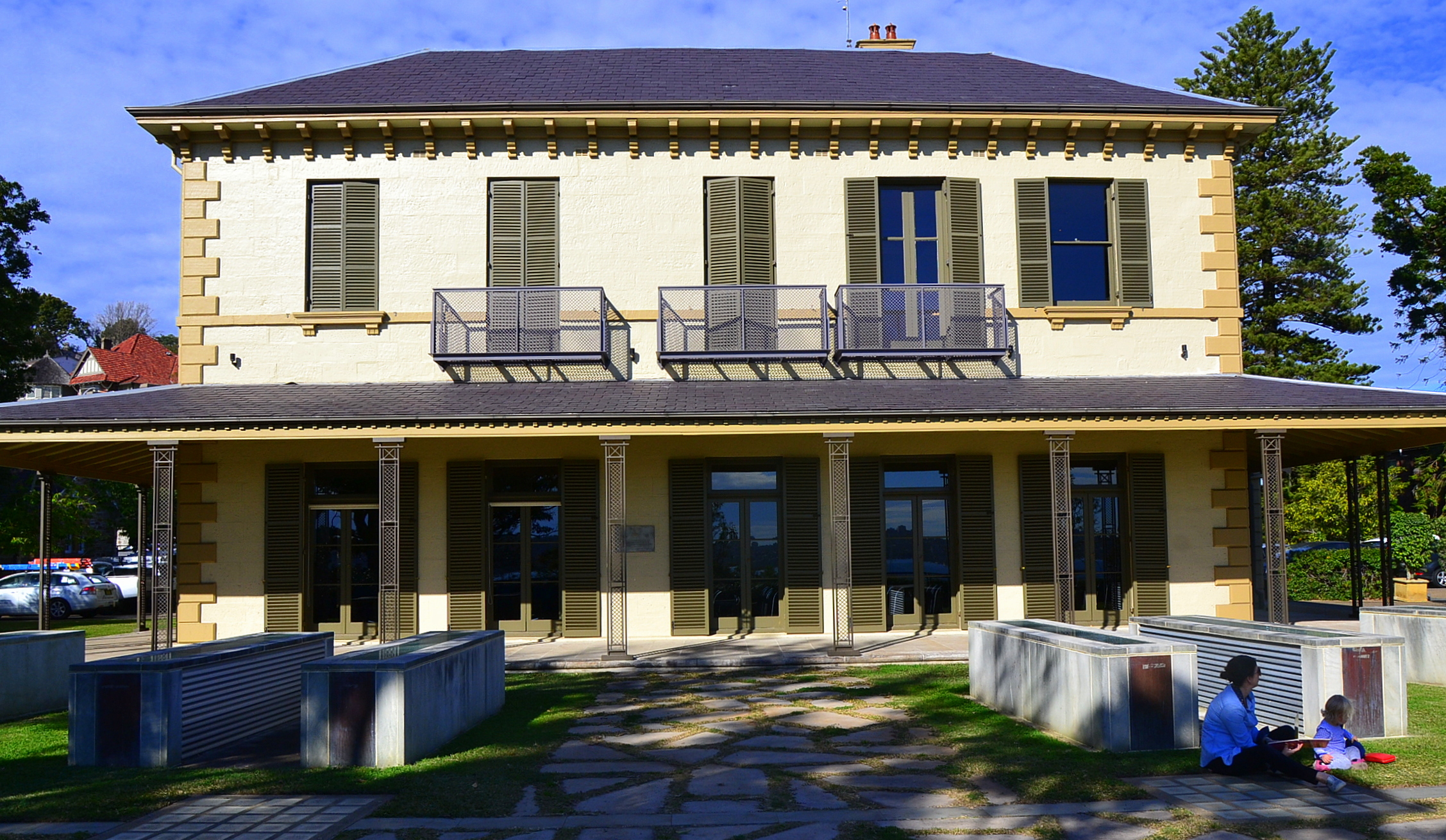
Woollahra Council Chambers in Double Bay

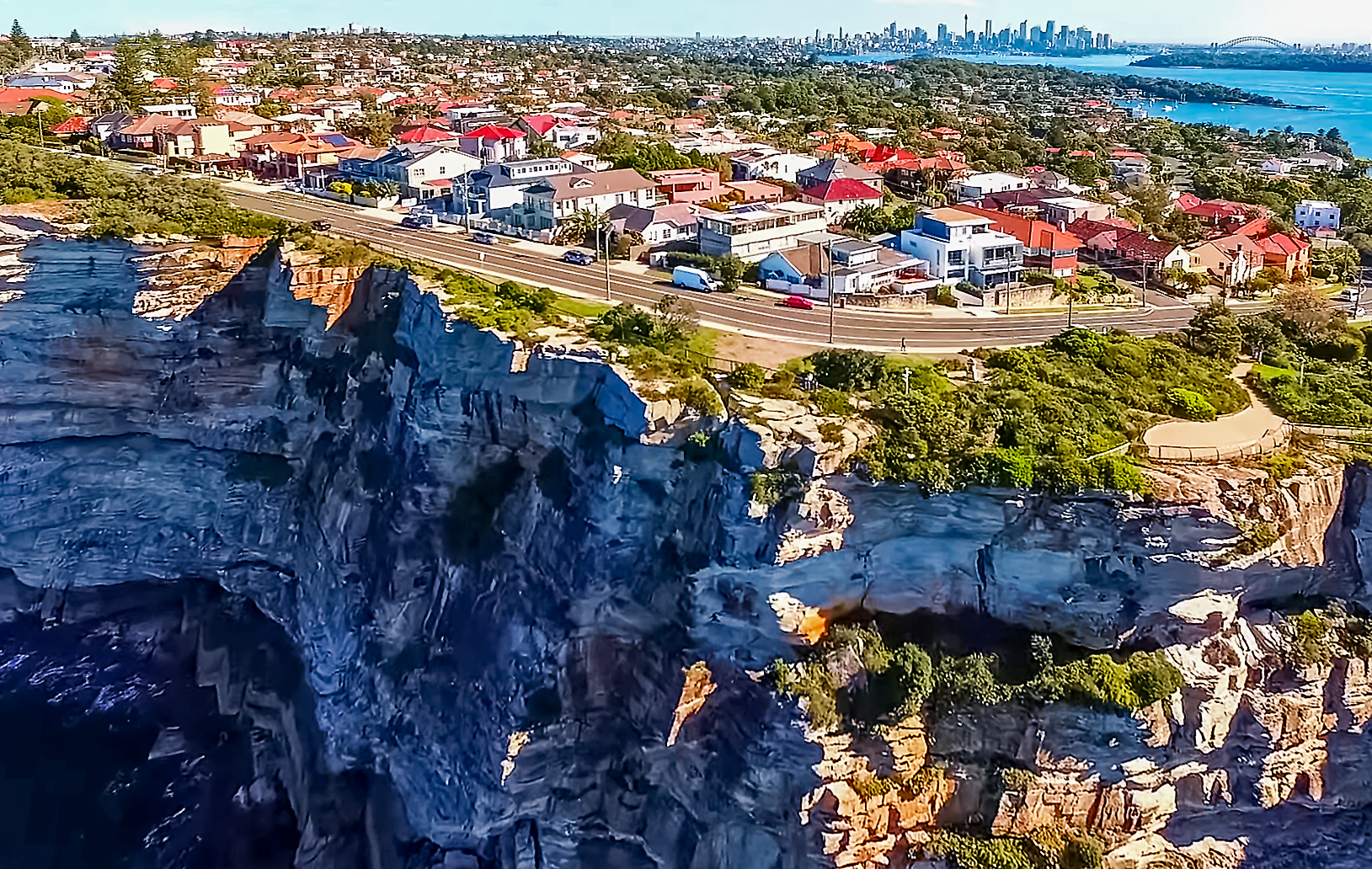
Vaucluse clifftop homes

Woollahra Municipal Council (or Woollahra Council) is a local government area in the eastern suburbs of Sydney, in the state of New South Wales, Australia. Woollahra is bounded by Sydney Harbour in the north, Waverley Council in the east, Randwick City in the south and the City of Sydney in the west.

The administrative centre of Woollahra Municipal Council is located at Redleaf in Double Bay. The mayor of Woollahra Municipal Council is Sarah Dixson.

== Suburbs in the local government area ==
Suburbs in the area include:

- Bellevue Hill
- Darling Point
- Double Bay
- Edgecliff
- Paddington (parts are located within City of Sydney Council)
- Point Piper
- Rose Bay (the east side of Old South Head Road is located within Waverley Council)
- Vaucluse (parts are located within Waverley Council)
- Watsons Bay
- Woollahra

== Demographics ==
In the 2021 Census, there were 53,496 people in the Woollahra Local Government Area. 46.6% were male and 53.4% were female. Aboriginal and Torres Strait Islander people made up 0.3% of the population, compared to 3.4% in NSW. The median age of people in the area was 41 years, older than the NSW or Australian median.

Population growth in the Municipality of Woollahra between the 2001 Census and the 2006 Census was 0.70%; and in the subsequent five years to the 2011 Census, population growth was 3.98%. When compared with total population growth of Australia for the same periods, being 5.78% and 8.32% respectively, population growth in Woollahra local government area was significantly lower than the national average. The median weekly income for residents within the Municipality of Woollahra was double the national average.

At the 2016 Census, the proportion of residents who stated a religious affiliation with Judaism was in excess of thirty–two times the state and national averages.

Selected historical census data for Woollahra local government area
| Census year | | 2001 | 2006 | 2011 | 2016 |
|---|---|---|---|---|---|
| Population | Estimated residents on census night | 49,814 | ▲50,161 | ▲52,158 | ▲54,240 |
| Population | LGA rank in terms of size within New South Wales | | 19th | ▼42nd | ▼43rd |
| Population | % of New South Wales population | | 1.90% | ▼0.75% | ▼0.73% |
| Population | % of Australian population | 0.26% | ▼0.25% | ▼0.24% | ▼0.23% |
| Cultural and language diversity | | | | | |
| Ancestry, top responses | English | | | 23.6% | ▲23.7% |
| Ancestry, top responses | Australian | | | 17.7% | ▼16.8% |
| Ancestry, top responses | Irish | | | 9.0% | ▲9.5% |
| Ancestry, top responses | Scottish | | | 6.9% | ▲7.2% |
| Ancestry, top responses | Chinese | | | n/c | ▲3.1% |
| Language, top responses (other than English) | Mandarin | n/c | n/c | ▲0.8% | ▲1.6% |
| Language, top responses (other than English) | French | 1.0% | 1.0% | ▲1.1% | ▲1.3% |
| Language, top responses (other than English) | Greek | 1.4% | ▼1.3% | 1.3% | 1.3% |
| Language, top responses (other than English) | Spanish | n/c | n/c | n/c | ▲1.1% |
| Language, top responses (other than English) | Italian | 1.2% | ▼1.1% | ▼1.0% | 1.0% |
| Religious affiliation | | | | | |
| Religious affiliation, top responses | No religion | 15.1% | ▲16.7% | ▲21.7% | ▲30.2% |
| Religious affiliation, top responses | Catholic | 19.9% | ▼19.7% | ▲20.2% | ▼19.1% |
| Religious affiliation, top responses | Anglican | 21.2% | ▼19.8% | ▼17.9% | ▼13.8% |
| Religious affiliation, top responses | Judaism | 13.4% | ▲14.1% | ▲14.2% | ▼13.0% |
| Religious affiliation, top responses | Not stated | n/c | n/c | n/c | ▲12.8% |
| Median weekly incomes | | | | | |
| Personal income | Median weekly personal income | | A$976 | A$1,145 | A$1,365 |
| Personal income | % of Australian median income | | 209.4% | ▼198.4% | ▲206.2% |
| Family income | Median weekly family income | | A$1,917 | A$2,832 | A$3,626 |
| Family income | % of Australian median income | | 186.7% | ▲191.2% | ▲209.1% |
| Household income | Median weekly household income | | A$2,654 | A$2,398 | A$2,687 |
| Household income | % of Australian median income | | 226.6% | ▼194.3% | ▼186.7% |

== Council ==
Woollahra Municipal Council is composed of fifteen councillors elected proportionally as five separate wards, each electing three Councillors. Councillors are usually elected for a fixed four-year term of office. The Mayor is elected by the Councillors at the first meeting of the council. The Council election of 14 September 2024 resulted in the following makeup:

=== Current composition and election method ===

| Party | Councillors |
|---|---|
| Liberal Party | 9 |
| Residents First Woollahra | 5 |
| The Greens | 1 |
| Total | 15 |

The council as elected in 2024, in order of election by ward, was:

| Ward | Councillor | Party | Notes |
|---|---|---|---|
| Bellevue Hill Ward | Sean Carmichael | Liberal | Deputy Mayor, (2024–28 September 2026) |
| Bellevue Hill Ward | Lucinda Regan | Residents First Woollahra | |
| Bellevue Hill Ward | Hugh Woodgate | Liberal | Deputy Mayor, (28 September 2026–present) |
| Cooper Ward | Sarah Dixson | Liberal | Mayor (2024–present) Deputy Mayor, (2023–2024) |
| Cooper Ward | Jeanette Mitchell | Liberal | |
| Cooper Ward | Torsten Blackwood | Residents First Woollahra | |
| Double Bay Ward | Toni Zeltzer | Liberal | Deputy Mayor, (2011–2012) and Mayor, (2013–2017) |
| Double Bay Ward | Mark Silcocks | Residents First | |
| Double Bay Ward | James Ardouin | Liberal | |
| Paddington Ward | Alexander Andruska | Liberal | |
| Paddington Ward | Harriet Price | Residents First | |
| Paddington Ward | Matthew Robertson | The Greens | |
| Vaucluse Ward | Mary-Lou Jarvis OAM | Liberal | Deputy Mayor, (2018–2019) |
| Vaucluse Ward | Merrill Halkerston Witt | Residents First | |
| Vaucluse Ward | Julian Parmegiani | Liberal | |

== Election results ==
=== 2024 ===
2024 New South Wales local elections: Woollahra
| Party | Votes | Seats | Change | % | Swing |
|---|---|---|---|---|---|
| Liberal | 16,143 | 9 | ▲1 | 57.03 | ▲6.33 |
| Residents First Woollahra | 9,393 | 5 | Steady | 33.18 | ▼4.62 |
| Greens | 2,769 | 1 | ▼1 | 9.78 | ▼1.72 |
| Formal votes | 28,305 | | | 96.46 | |
| Informal votes | 1,039 | | | 3.54 | |
| Total | 29,344 | 15 | | 100.00 | |

== History ==
The name 'Woollahra' is thought to be derived from an Aboriginal word meaning 'camp' or 'meeting ground'.

A petition was submitted in 1859 with 144 signatures of local residents from Darling Point, Paddington and Watsons Bay for the formation of the Municipality. With no petition against formation of the Municipality, Woollahra was proclaimed to be named so on 17 April 1860, and gazetted on 20 April 1860. At the first meeting, The Hon. George Thornton was elected as the first Chairman of Woollahra. The municipality was expanded in 1949 by uniting with the Municipality of Vaucluse under the Local Government (Areas) Act 1948.

In 1947, after previously acquiring 'Iron House' on Ocean Street, in the 1860s, Council transferred to the current site at Redleaf.

Woollahra largely developed as a residential locality. A few small local industries were established in Woollahra, Double Bay and Paddington; but with the residential gentrification of Paddington and Woollahra in the 1960s, most of these cottage industries had vanished by the end of the 20th century.

In 2002, 14 square kilometres were transferred from the Area of Woollahra to the Area of Waverley.

Woollahra's cultural heritage has been enriched by the influx of people from many different cultural backgrounds. Some of the influential immigrants to Woollahra have been the Chinese market gardeners, who began leasing land in Double Bay gully and Rose Bay in the 1880s; the Portuguese whalers who settled at Watsons Bay in the 19th century, building a church and becoming a part of the village life, and the many Europeans who migrated after World War II and helped change the face of commercial centres such as Double Bay.

A 2015 review of local government boundaries recommended that the Municipality of Woollahra merge with the Waverley and Randwick councils to form a new council with an area of 58 square kilometres (22 sq mi) and support a population of approximately 274,000. Following an independent review, in May 2016 the NSW Government sought to dismiss the council and force its amalgamation with Waverley and Randwick councils. Woollahra Council instigated legal action claiming that there was procedural unfairness and that a KPMG report at the centre of merger proposals had been "misleading". The matter was heard before the NSW Court of Appeal who, in December 2016, unanimously dismissed the council's appeal, finding no merit in its arguments that the proposed merger with its neighbouring councils was invalid. In July 2017, the Berejiklian government decided to abandon the forced merger of the Woollahra, Waverley and Randwick local government areas, along with several other proposed forced mergers.

Woollahra's population history from the 1960s to 2021 has been stable and slowly risen since the late 1960s to present, rising from 47,326 in 1966 to 53,295 in 1976. It is noted that the area is not comparable between these periods due to a boundary adjustment in the Paddington area in 1968 of approximately 330 acres (1.33 square kilometres) of land. This change removed a portion of land from the City of Sydney, which had been part of an addition made to it twenty years earlier when the entirety of the former Municipality of Paddington had been added to the City of Sydney under the Local Government (Areas) Act 1948, adding it to Woollahra. The population of Woollahra had fallen to 51,659 by 1986. The population was relatively stable between 1991 and 2006, at around 50,000. In 2003 there was a significant land transfer of 0.14 square kilometres of land to Waverley Council. The population then increased slightly, rising to 53,910 in 2021. Most new development in the area is redevelopment (mixed used developments) and infill (medium/high density housing).

In 2026, the Municipality of Woollahra opposed the State-led Rezoning Proposal.

In October 2026, Woollahra councillor Sean Carmichael contested incumbent Mayor Sarah Dixson for the Liberal Party caucus vote. An agreement was believed to hand the mayoralty to councillor Mary Lou Jarvis after one year.

In October 2026, the Mayor of Woollahra Sarah Dickson looked up the value of a pro-housing advocate's home in preparation for a council meeting. The advocate criticised the Mayor for accessing his private address through a form he submitted to the council. and claimed it would have a chilling effect on community consultation. Sarah Dickson stated she does not own a house, but she owns three apartments.

== Heritage listings ==
The Municipality of Woollahra has a number of heritage-listed sites, including:

- Bellevue Hill, 24 Victoria Road: Leura
- Darling Point, 1a Carthona Avenue: Lindesay
- Darling Point, 68 Darling Point Road: The Swifts
- Darling Point, 103 Darling Point Road: Babworth House
- Darling Point, 11–21 Greenoaks Avenue: Bishopscourt
- Double Bay, Cross Street: Double Bay Compressed Air Ejector Station
- Double Bay, 11 Gladswood Gardens: Gladswood House
- Double Bay, 337–347 New South Head Road: Overthorpe
- Double Bay, 560 New South Head Road: Fairwater
- Double Bay, 4 and 6 Wiston Gardens: Houses
- Edgecliff, 8 Albert Street: Fenton and surrounds
- Paddington, 1 Ormond Street: Juniper Hall, Paddington
- Paddington, 56a Ormond Street: Engehurst
- Paddington, 246 Oxford Street: Paddington Post Office
- Paddington, 1 Young Street: Paddington Substation
- Point Piper, 10 Dunara Gardens: Dunara
- Rose Bay, 3–4 Fernleigh Gardens: Site of Ficus superba var. henneana tree
- Rose Bay, 1–7 Salisbury Road: Salisbury Court (Rose Bay)
- Vaucluse, 32b Fitzwilliam Road: Wentworth Memorial Church
- Vaucluse, Chapel Road: Wentworth Mausoleum
- Vaucluse, Greycliffe Avenue: Nielsen Park
- Vaucluse, Old South Head Road: Macquarie Lighthouse
- Vaucluse, 52 Vaucluse Road: Strickland House, Vaucluse
- Vaucluse, 69a Wentworth Road: Vaucluse House
- Watsons Bay, Dunbar (ship)
- Watsons Bay, Old South Head Road: Hornby Lighthouse
- Woollahra, 14 Rosemont Avenue: Rosemont
- Woollahra, Waimea Avenue: Waimea House

== Coat of arms ==
Coat of arms of the Municipality of Woollahra

Adopted
Granted by the Kings of Arms, 10 May 1964.
Crest
On a Wreath of the Colours in front of a Demi-Sun in splendour Or two Cornucopias in a saltire proper.
Helm
A closed Helmet, mantling Azure, doubled Argent.
Escutcheon
Argent, on a Pile issuant in base Azure between two threemasted Sailing Ships sails furled proper pennants flying Gules a representation of the constellation of the Southern Cross Argent, on a chief of the Second a Garb Or.
Supporters
On the dexter side an Emu and on the sinister side a Kangaroo each supporting a Staff proper flying therefrom a Banner barry wavy of six Argent and Azure.
Compartment
A field of Grass Vert.
Motto
Peace, Plenty, Progress
Symbolism
Many of the features of the Arms, including the supporters and motto, come from the Council Seal adopted in 1907. The two sailing ships in the escutcheon allude to both the position of the Municipality on the southern shore of Port Jackson, but also Captain Arthur Phillip's landing with the First Fleet at Camp Cove in 1788. The Southern Cross, and the kangaroo and emu supporters, are common additions for Australian arms. The rising sun in the crest symbolises the position of Woollahra on the east coast of Australia, as well as the promise of the future, while the Cornucopias in front signify the prosperity and position of Woollahra. The gold sheaf of wheat in the escutcheon is also included as a symbol of plenty and prosperity. The banners held by the supporters refer to the expansive water frontages of Woollahra, being bounded by the Tasman Sea to the east and Port Jackson to the north.

== See also ==
- Local government areas of New South Wales
- Woollahra#2025 Woollahra rezoning proposal
