= Clements Frederick Vivian Jackson =

Australian mining engineer

Clements Frederick Jackson
- Born: Clements Frederick Vivian Jackson; 24 April 1873; Double Bay, Sydney, Australia
- Died: 27 February 1955 (aged 81); Brisbane, Queensland, Australia

Clements Frederick Jackson (24 April 1873, in Double Bay, Sydney, Australia – 27 February 1955, in Brisbane, Queensland, Australia) was an Australian mining engineer.
