= Paddington Substation =

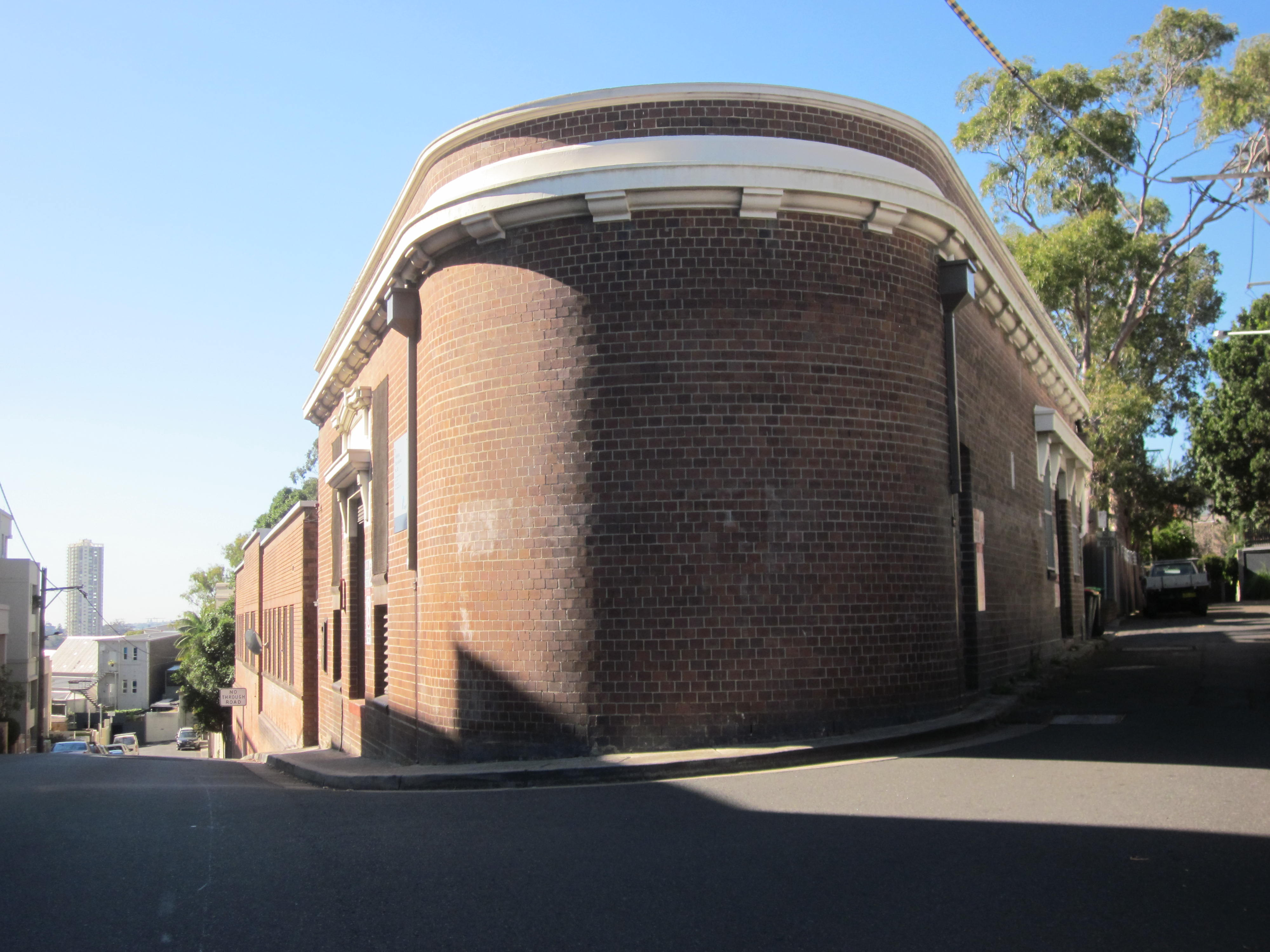
- Paddington Substation, 1 Young Street, Paddington New South Wales

- Location within Sydney Location within Australia
- 33°53′03″S 151°13′31″E
- Location: 1 Young Street, Paddington, Municipality of Woollahra, New South Wales, Australia

History
- Built: 1926

Site notes
- Architectural style: Interwar Free Classical
- Owner: Ausgrid

New South Wales Heritage Register
- Official name: Paddington Substation; Substation #342 Paddington 33 kV Zone
- Type: State heritage (built)
- Designated: 2 April 1999
- Reference no.: 939
- Type: Electricity transformer/substation
- Category: Utilities – Electricity

Paddington Substation is a heritage-listed electrical substation built in 1926 and located at 1 Young Street, Paddington in the Municipality of Woollahra local government area of New South Wales, Australia. It is also known as Substation #342 Paddington 33 kV Zone. The property is owned by Ausgrid, an agency of the Government of New South Wales. It was added to the New South Wales State Heritage Register on 2 April 1999.

== History ==
The Paddington Zone substation is a purpose designed and built structure dating from 1926.

== Description ==
The Paddington Zone substation is a fine and excellent example of an unusual tuck pointed face brick building with a curved wall following its corner position. Designed in the Interwar Free Classical style it features a dominant classical rendered cornice below the parapet, a pediment above the central entrance doorway flanked by multi paned windows. It makes a considerable contribution to the character of the Paddington Streetscape. It is located in the Paddington Urban Conservation Araea as listed by the National Trust of Australia. The Paddington Zone substation is constructed using tuck pointed face brick work and features a bold rendered cornice below the parapet. External materials include face brick, cement render, and steel roller shutter.

=== Condition ===
As at 10 November 2000, the condition was good.

== Heritage listing ==
The Paddington Zone substation is a fine rare and representative example of an externally intact Interwar Functionalist building located within Paddington Urban Conservation Area as listed by the National Trust. It makes a substantial contribution to the character of the streetscape in the Paddington area. It has considerable architectural significance on a state level, as the only known example of its kind in the Sydney area.

Paddington Substation was listed on the New South Wales State Heritage Register on 2 April 1999.

== See also ==
- Australian non-residential architectural styles
