= Engehurst =

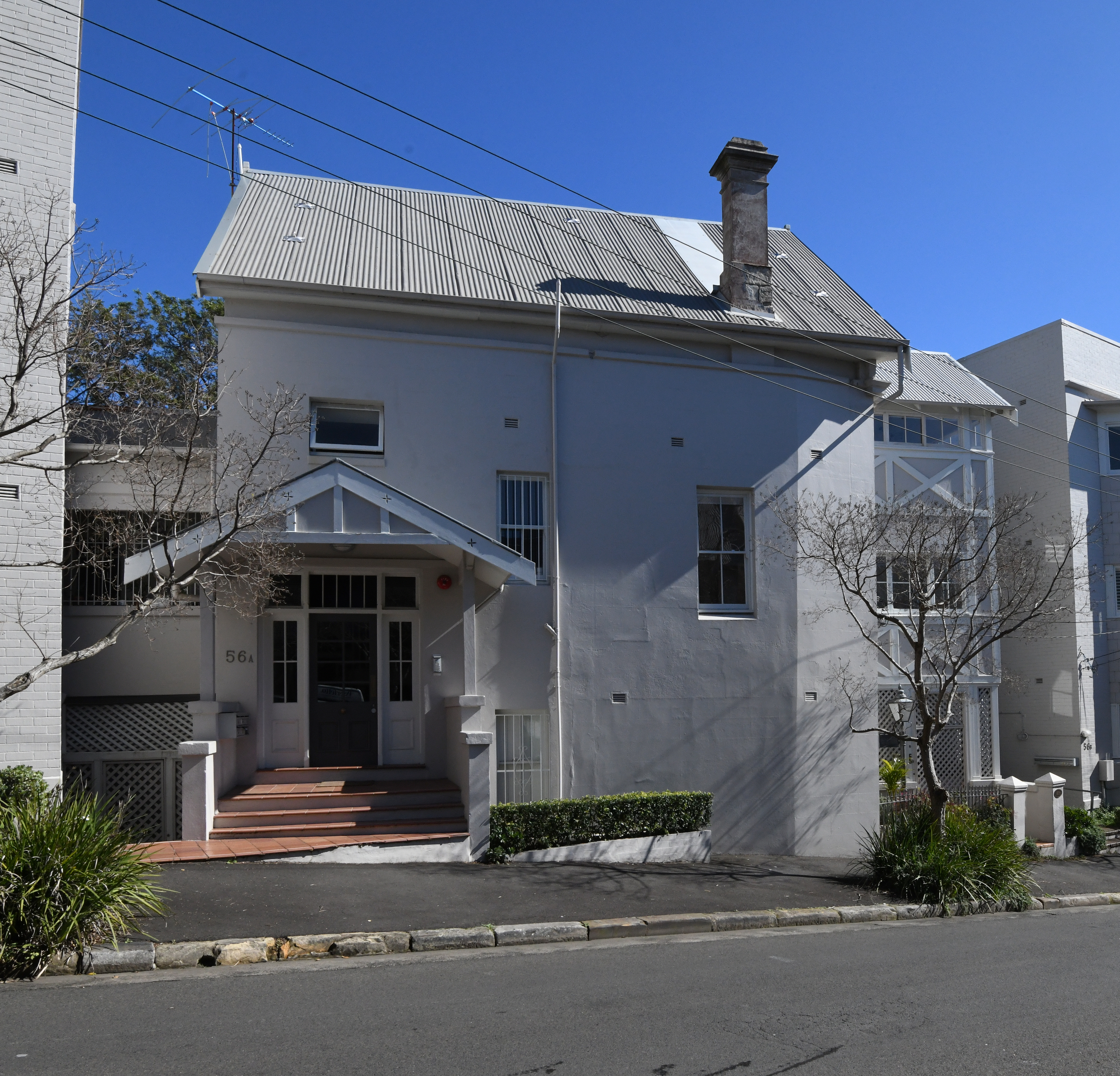
- Engehurst

- Location within Sydney Location within Australia
- 33°52′50″S 151°13′33″E
- Location: Paddington, New South Wales, Australia

History
- Built: 1834–1835

Site notes
- Architect: John Verge
- Architectural style: Victorian Georgian

New South Wales Heritage Register
- Official name: Engehurst
- Type: State heritage (built)
- Designated: 2 April 1999
- Reference no.: 575
- Type: Villa
- Category: Residential buildings (private)

Engehurst is a heritage-listed residence located in Paddington, New South Wales, Australia. It was designed by John Verge and built from 1834 to 1835. It was added to the New South Wales State Heritage Register on 2 April 1999.

== History ==
=== Paddington ===
This suburb, which took its name from the London borough, lies in what were once paddocks adjacent to Victoria Barracks. It was the first of the early Sydney suburbs that was not self-sufficient – its inhabitants, unlike those of Balmain or Newtown, where work was available in local industries, had to go away each day to their places of employment. Development of the Eastern Suburbs (Edgecliff, Double Bay, Point Piper and Woollahra) surrounded this area with wealthy people's homes so this small hilly suburb lost all hope of harbour views.

The area developed after a road was constructed to link up with a pilot station that was to be built at Watsons Bay (South Head Road). John Palmer, the settlement's commissary, refused to allow people to cross his land grant ('Woolloomooloo'), so the road had to follow a roundabout way through Paddington to bypass his 40 hectares (100 acres). Only a handful of workers lived in the area, and it was not until 1838, when it was decided to build a new military barracks in Paddington, that life came to the area. From 1848 when Victoria Barracks had been opened (designed by Lt.-Col. George Barney) and homes for the soldiers and their families had been erected, Paddington began to assume a real identity...The (barracks site) land was sandy - in fact a huge sandhill was located on the western side of the Greens Road area, and the foundation trenches had to be dug very deep, to locate firm stone for the foundations. Stone was mostly quarried in the area: the stonemasons were free settlers who had worked on erection of the Customs House at what was then Semi-Circular Quay.

Once the soldiers and their families moved here, shopkeepers followed. Builders moved into the area and put up 3,800 houses between 1860 and 1890. These terraces give today's Paddington its air of individuality...The first school in the area was opened in the Presbyterian manse in Oxford Street, built in 1845. It is hard to imagine that in 1822 the mansion Juniper Hall (the opposite southern corner of Oxford Street from the Reservoir site) stood alone, without the many neighbours it has today. Set in a flagged garden, it had attic windows that gave panoramic views to Rushcutters Bay and Botany Bay. Juniper Hall was built for Robert Cooper, distiller and emancipist merchant, who with partners James Underwood and Francis Ewen Forbes, had received 40 hectares (100 acres) from Governor Brisbane in c. 1818, covering the whole of north Paddington, and they agreed to erect three mansions and a distillery there. A distillery was built at the foot of Cascade Street near Taylor Square and Cooper bought out his partners, and only Juniper Hall was erected. The Coopers were part of the social scene of their day and entertained many notables of that time.

Today few of the area's original working class residents remain, as the suburb's proximity to the city has made it popular with business and professional people who prefer inner-city living in this historic area. The shopping centre, concentrated on the north side of Oxford Street, has also changed from one serving local needs to one of cafes, speciality shops and boutiques. Much of this is related to the changing population and the Village Bazaar, or Paddington Markets. The bazaar, which has operated since the mid-1970s, draws visitors from all over the city and has contributed to Paddington's development as one of Sydney's favourite tourist spots, along with Bondi Beach and The Rocks.

=== Engehurst ===
The site is located in the Rushcutters Bay Valley, bounded by the Old South Head, New South Head, Point Piper and Boundary Roads, and characterised in the mid-nineteenth century by architect-designed "mansion villas" situated in cultivated grounds for the 'Paddington Gentry.' The site of Engehurst was part of the original seven acre grant to Frederick Augustus Hely and Francis Nicholas Rossi. Engehurst was designed by architect John Verge and built for Frederick Augustus Hely, Principal Superintendent of Convicts, in 1834–1835, located on the original two-point-eight-hectare (seven-acre) grant to Hely and Francis Nicholas Rossi. The house was built using convict labour.

Hely was Principal Superintendent of Convicts from 1823 until his death in 1836. After receiving a Crown grant of 1 acre, 2 roods and 2 perches, he purchased 6 acres and 2 roods from Captain Nicholas Rossi, Superintendent of Police, in September 1833 with frontage to new road in the Valley of Rushcutter (subsequently Glenmore Road). Wyoming at Gosford was also designed by Verge for Hely, though it was not built until after Hely's death.

The kitchen and servant's wings, built roughly to an H-shaped plan, were under construction in 1834 and were occupied by Hely in 1835. The original wings of servant's offices. Kitchen and stables were connected to each other by a trellis screen and to the main house by a tunnel. Plans were made for screen and to the main house by a tunnel. Plans were made for a two storeyed house facing the service wings across a two storeyed house facing the service wings across a courtyard. By June 1836, it appears Hely had doubts about so grand a scheme, for Verge then designed a decorative pavilion with a pediment and balustrade roof line to site forward of the wings. Hely died in September 1836 and it is uncertain if Engehurst was ever completed to Verge's plans.

Hely died in 1836 prior to Engehurst's completion. The Sydney District Council Assessment Book D66 1843–46 describes Engehurst as '....a good large stone cottage with stables, gardener's house, out officers, garden, etc.'. The Hely family advertised the property in 1868 as including 'thirty-one splendid allotments, fourteen fronting Glenmore Road and seventeen from Hely Street. Engehurst was purchased by Ebenezer Vickery and immediately sold to John Elly Begg in 1868.

Begg, a Paddington alderman, built the nearby mansion Olive Bank on the grounds of Engehurst in 1869 and the amassed land around the Engehurst property during the following decade. Begg's son purchased the mansion Juniper Hall in 1872. In 1878, John Begg subdivided his property and demolished most of Engehurst in order to create Begg Street (later Ormonde Street). This street crossed the stables, kitchen and main residence. It is thought that stone from demolished wings was used to build part of the first floor (i.e., above the former kitchen wing, source D). The servants' quarters were not affected by the street but were soon engulfed by new development in the late nineteenth century. The surviving portion of Engehurst, on a half acre property, remained as a single residence until, in the 1920s, the flanking apartment buildings were built and the original part divided into flats. Max Kelly, in "A Paddock Full of Houses", writes that there is some doubt if Engehurst was completed, however the description in the For Sale notice 18 March 1886 is much the same as Verge intended and dimensions of rooms similar to those in Verge's drawings. Begg was responsible for the subdivision of the three estates in 1878. Engehurst, with significantly reduced grounds, passed to Robert H. Reynolds, J.P.

Reynolds resided here until 1914, at which time the property passed to accountant Phinechas Bear Selig. It appears Engehurst was converted to flats c. 1922, initially named Silsoe Flats, and later Craigieburn Flats. The building has associations with a number of prominent local identities in both social and political circles and as a reflection of the type of development which was common to the area in the early nineteenth century.

== Description ==
The site of Engehurst was part of the original two-point-eight-hectare (seven-acre) grant to Hely and Francis Nicholas Rossi.

=== House ===
The building has a simple facade treatment which follows the form and detailing of the original design: a two- to three-storey rendered-stone residence in the Victorian Georgian style. A three-storey gabled section fronting onto Ormond Street has galvanised iron roof and boxed eaves, decorative timber bargeboards and gable screen. Walls are rendered masonry, ashlar lined, and feature stucco string course below eaves. Windows to eastern facade are randomly placed, and are timber multi-paned double hung or casement. An entrance at the southern end has multi-paned door, top and side lights. A small gabled porch supported by timber posts on a rendered masonry base, has decorative timber barge board, gable end, and plasterboard lining to the underside.

The northern facade is a parapet wall, and features Classical detailing, including stone pilasters supporting entablatures at both ground and first-floor level. Bare sandstone at ground level, rendered and lined at first-floor level. Tall narrow timber double-hung windows at ground level, stone sills, and internal security grilles. Windows at first-floor level have segmental arched heads and stucco architraves.

A three-storey timber-framed addition to the north eastern corner has gable roof with galvanised iron sheeting, similar barge board and gable screen. Exposed timber frame, timber lattice infill at ground level, fibre cement infill to upper floors. Windows are multi-paned casement, unframed sliding glass windows at second-floor level have internal concertina style shutters. Terra cotta tiled courts behind stone and cast-iron fence to Ormond Street.

A plaque erected by the Lions Club of Paddington for the bicentenary reads 'Engehurst 1835 Facade of John Verge's Georgian Mansion built for Augustus Hely.' Style: Victorian Georgian External Materials: Sandstone walls, sections rendered and ashlar lined. Galvanised iron sheeting to roof, timber bargeboards and gable screens. Timber-framed addition, fibre cement panels. Timber double hung or casement windows, multi-paned door. Internal Materials: Unseen.

=== Condition ===
As at 25 January 2013, the building's simple facade treatment follows the form and detailing of the original design. The building has some research potential and would have some archaeological potential due to the time it has been in place.

=== Modifications and dates ===
There are two three-storey brick apartment buildings to the north and south. Alterations include, the replacement of a paling fence and concrete retaining wall to the rear alignment with a new concrete block wall in 1972, and the renovation of existing external metal stairs in 1983. In 1987 alterations included bathroom and kitchen renovations, the restoration of the rear balcony, construction of new laundries into existing hallways, and new internal stairs. Conservation work to existing fabric was also undertaken at this time, and included repairs to existing joinery, surfaces and finishes, and some repainting.

== Heritage listing ==
Engehurst was listed on the New South Wales State Heritage Register on 2 April 1999.

== See also ==
- Australian residential architectural styles
