= List of mayors of Woollahra =

Mayor of Woollahra
- Incumbent; Sarah Swan since 9 October 2024
- Style: His/Her Worship the Mayor Councillor
- Appointer: Woollahra Municipal Council
- Term length: Two years, renewable indefinitely
- Inaugural holder: George Thornton (Chairman); Montagu Stephen (Mayor)
- Formation: 6 June 1860
- Deputy: Hugh Woodgate
- Salary: $20,370–46,010 (2022)
- Website: www.woollahra.nsw.gov.au

The mayor of Woollahra is the head of Woollahra Municipal Council, which is a local government area covering part of the Eastern Suburbs of Sydney in the State of New South Wales, Australia. First incorporated on 20 April 1860 as the Municipality of Woollahra, under the terms of the Municipalities Act of 1858, the first leaders of the Council were titled "Chairman" until the 1858 act was replaced by the Municipalities Act of 1867, which introduced the title of "Mayor". On 1 July 1993 following the enactment of a new Local Government Act, elected representatives of the council were to be known as "Councillor", replacing the former title of "Alderman".

The Mayor is internally-elected by the Councillors, and nominally serves a two-year term since 2017, which replaced the previous system of annual mayoral elections. The current mayor of Woollahra is Councillor Sarah Swan (Liberal), first elected on 9 October 2024. The mayor is assisted in their work by a Deputy Mayor, who is elected for a two-year term by the elected Councillors.

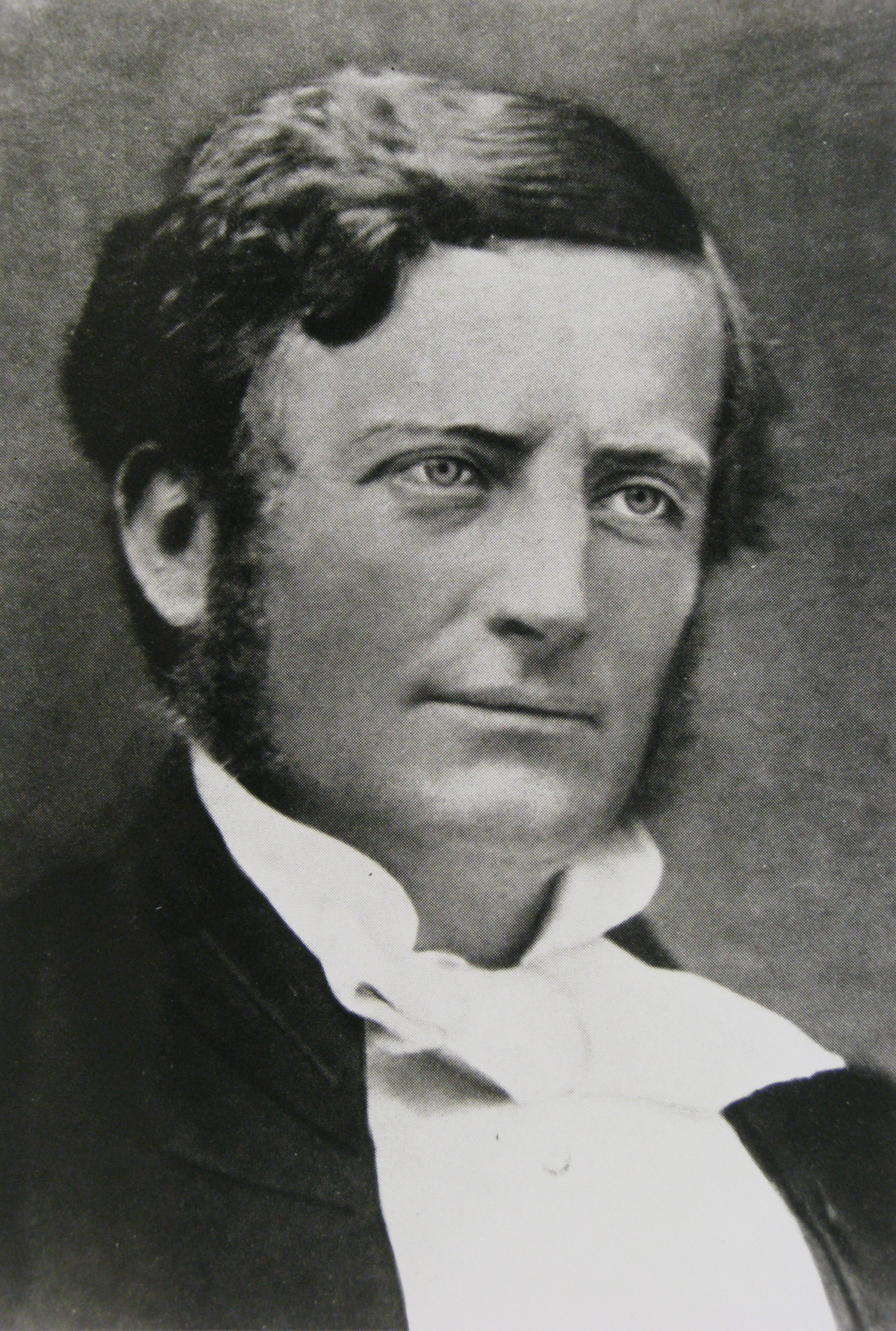
George Thornton, the first chairman.

== List of incumbents ==
#	Chairman	Party	Term start	Term end	Time in office	Notes
1	George Thornton	No party	6 June 1860	19 February 1861	258 days	
2	Samuel Thompson	No party	19 February 1861	11 February 1862	357 days	
3	Richard Holdsworth	No party	11 February 1862	10 February 1863	364 days	
4	John Valentine Gorman	No party	10 February 1863	9 February 1864	364 days	
5	Joseph Trickett	No party	9 February 1864	2 February 1865	359 days	
6	Charles Martyn	No party	February 1865	20 February 1866	1 year, 18 days	
7	Daniel Bulman	No party	20 February 1866	February 1867	346 days	
8	Randolph Nott	No party	February 1867	11 February 1868	1 year, 10 days	
#	Mayor	Party	Term start	Term end	Time in office	Notes
9	Montagu Stephen	No party	11 February 1868	22 February 1871	3 years, 11 days	
–	Daniel Bulman	No party	22 February 1871	13 February 1872	356 days	
10	Walter Friend	No party	13 February 1872	18 February 1873	1 year, 5 days	
11	William Teale	No party	18 February 1873	February 1874	348 days	
12	Benjamin Cocks	No party	February 1874	21 June 1875	1 year, 140 days	
13	John Vincent Barnard	No party	21 June 1875	27 November 1877	2 years, 159 days	
14	James Sutherland Mitchell	No party	27 November 1877	8 February 1878	73 days	
15	William Adams Brodribb	No party	8 February 1878	11 February 1879	1 year, 3 days	
16	William Trickett	No party	11 February 1879	7 February 1881	1 year, 362 days	
17	Robert Butcher	No party	7 February 1881	9 February 1886	5 years, 2 days	
–	William Trickett	No party	9 February 1886	11 June 1888	2 years, 123 days	
18	John Neild	Independent	15 June 1888	18 February 1890	1 year, 248 days	
19	Thomas Magney	Independent	18 February 1890	14 February 1899	8 years, 361 days	
20	David Davis	Independent	14 February 1899	13 February 1900	364 days	
21	William Latimer	Independent	13 February 1900	7 February 1910	9 years, 359 days	
22	Thomas Christie Fairweather	Independent	7 February 1910	6 February 1911	364 days	
–	Thomas Magney	Independent	6 February 1911	5 February 1914	2 years, 364 days	
23	Leo Whitby Robinson	Independent	5 February 1914	September 1916	2 years, 209 days	
24	George Dyson	Independent	September 1916	12 February 1918	1 year, 164 days	
–	William Latimer	Independent	12 February 1918	20 December 1920	2 years, 312 days	
25	James Polidore Bradley	Independent	20 December 1920	8 December 1922	1 year, 353 days	
26	William Foster	Independent	8 December 1922	10 December 1925	3 years, 2 days	
–	Thomas Christie Fairweather (acting)	Independent	26 March 1923	26 November 1923	245 days	
–	Leo Whitby Robinson	Independent	10 December 1925	6 December 1929	3 years, 361 days	
27	George Slater Grimley	Independent	6 December 1929	8 January 1932	2 years, 33 days	
28	Hugh Latimer	Independent	8 January 1932	10 December 1935	3 years, 336 days	
29	Keith Denis Manion	Independent	10 December 1935	15 December 1936	1 year, 5 days	
30	Arthur Griffith	Independent	15 December 1936	14 December 1937	364 days	
–	George Slater Grimley	Independent	14 December 1937	11 December 1939	1 year, 362 days	
31	John Douglas Lesingham Gaden	Independent	11 December 1939	10 December 1940	365 days	
32	Lyle Howard Marshall Moore	Independent	10 December 1940	16 December 1941	1 year, 6 days	
–	Keith Denis Manion	Independent	16 December 1941	7 December 1942	356 days	
33	Aubrey Erskine Smith	Independent	7 December 1942	7 December 1943	1 year, 0 days	
34	Leon Snider	Independent	7 December 1943	11 December 1944	1 year, 4 days	
–	George Slater Grimley	Independent	11 December 1944	9 December 1946	1 year, 363 days	
35	Reginald Rosborough Thornton	Independent	9 December 1946	8 December 1947	364 days	
36	Leslie Edye Duff	Independent	8 December 1947	31 December 1948	1 year, 23 days	
–	Hugh Latimer	Independent	1 January 1949	11 December 1951	2 years, 344 days	
37	William Frederick Arthur Harvey	Independent	11 December 1951	9 December 1952	364 days	
38	Chester William Davies	Independent	9 December 1952	15 December 1953	1 year, 6 days	
–	Leslie Edye Duff	Independent	15 December 1953	December 1954	351 days	
39	John Esler Calwell	Independent	December 1954	December 1955		
40	Hugh Carlyle Foster	Independent	December 1955	December 1956		
41	Norman Ernest Mills	Independent	December 1956	December 1957		
–	William Frederick Arthur Harvey	Independent	December 1957	December 1958		
42	A. D. Frost	Independent	December 1958	December 1959		
–	John Esler Calwell	Independent	December 1959	December 1960		
43	Allan Charles Murchison	Independent	December 1960	December 1961		
–	Maxwell Elliott Lawrence	Independent	December 1961	December 1962		
–	Allan Charles Murchison	Independent	December 1962	December 1963		
–	Maxwell Elliott Lawrence	Independent	December 1963	December 1964		
44	Graham John Crouch	Independent	December 1964	December 1965		
–	Maxwell Elliott Lawrence	Independent	December 1965	December 1966		
–	Allan Charles Murchison	Independent	December 1966	December 1967		
–	Graham John Crouch	Independent	December 1967	December 1968		
45	Andrew Midwood Clayton	Independent	December 1968	December 1969		
46	Grosvenor Charles Thomas Burfitt-Williams	Independent	December 1969	December 1970		
47	David L. Parker	Independent	December 1970	September 1971		
48	John William O'Brien	Independent	September 1971	September 1972		
49	Thomas O'Loghlen Reynolds	Independent	September 1972	September 1973		
50	Michael Keith Fosbery Bray	Independent	September 1973	September 1974		
51	Graham John O'Neill	Independent	September 1974	September 1975		
–	John William O'Brien	Independent	September 1975	September 1976		
–	Michael Keith Fosbery Bray	Independent	September 1976	September 1977		
52	Anthony Wentworth Perry	Independent	September 1977	September 1978		
53	Brenda Somerville Backhouse	Independent	September 1978	September 1979		
54	Francis Patrick Donohoe	Independent	September 1979	September 1980		
55	Charles Bernard Alexander Widdy	Independent	September 1980	September 1981		
56	David Fulton Rofe	Independent	September 1981	September 1982		
57	Judith Ann May	Independent	September 1982	September 1983		
58	John Mungo MacCallum	Independent	September 1983	September 1985		
59	Hylda Ann Rolfe	Independent	September 1985	September 1986		
–	Charles Bernard Alexander Widdy	Independent	September 1986	September 1987		
60	Susan Margaret Collett	Independent	September 1987	September 1988		
61	Elaine Cassidy	Independent	September 1988	September 1989		
–	Hylda Ann Rolfe	Independent	September 1989	September 1990		
62	Peter King	Independent	September 1990	September 1991		
63	Catherine Elizabeth Lemech	Independent	September 1991	September 1992		
64	Andrew Briger	Independent	September 1992	September 1994		
65	David Leach	Independent	September 1994	September 1995		
66	Neville Gruzman	Independent	September 1995	4 September 1996		
67	Greg James Medcraft	Independent	4 September 1996	September 1998		
68	Mairaed Bilmon	Woollahra Action Committee	September 1998	21 September 1999	1 year, 20 days	
69	Andrew Petrie	Liberal	21 September 1999	September 2000	346 days	
70	Christopher J. Dawson	Independent	September 2000	19 September 2001	1 year, 18 days	
71	John Comino	Liberal	19 September 2001	15 April 2004	2 years, 209 days	
72	Geoffrey Rundle	Residents First	15 April 2004	7 September 2005	1 year, 145 days	
–	Andrew Petrie	Liberal	7 September 2005	20 September 2006	1 year, 13 days	
73	Keri Huxley	Liberal	20 September 2006	17 September 2007	362 days	
–	Geoffrey Rundle	Residents First	17 September 2007	13 September 2008	362 days	
–	Andrew Petrie	Liberal	1 October 2008	21 September 2010	1 year, 355 days	
74	Isabelle Shapiro	Independent	21 September 2010	13 September 2011	357 days	
75	Susan Wynne	Residents First	13 September 2011	27 September 2012	1 year, 14 days	
–	Andrew Petrie	Liberal	27 September 2012	19 September 2013	357 days	
76	Toni Zeltzer	Liberal	19 September 2013	25 September 2017	4 years, 6 days	
77	Peter Cavanagh	Liberal	25 September 2017	23 September 2019	1 year, 363 days	
–	Susan Wynne	Liberal	23 September 2019	26 September 2023	7 years, 60 days	
78	Richard Shields	Liberal	26 September 2023	9 October 2024	1 Year, 13 Days	
78	Sarah Swan	Liberal	9 October 2024	Incumbent	2 years, 44 days	

== Deputy Mayors ==
The position of Deputy Mayor was made a permanent council position under the Local Government Act 1919. The following individuals have been elected as Deputy Mayor of Woollahra:

#	Deputy Mayor	Party	Term start	Term end	Time in office	Notes	Mayor
	Keri Huxley	Liberal	15 April 2004	13 September 2004	151 days		Rundle
	David Shoebridge	Greens	13 September 2004	7 September 2005	359 days		Rundle
	Marcus Ehrlich	Labor	7 September 2005	20 September 2006	2 years, 10 days		Petrie
	Marcus Ehrlich	Labor	20 September 2006	17 September 2007	2 years, 10 days		Huxley
	Isabelle Shapiro	Independent	17 September 2007	1 October 2008	2 years, 6 days		Rundle
	Isabelle Shapiro	Independent	1 October 2008	23 September 2009	2 years, 6 days		Petrie
	Peter Cavanagh	Liberal	23 September 2009	21 September 2010	1 year, 355 days		Petrie
	Peter Cavanagh	Liberal	21 September 2010	13 September 2011	1 year, 355 days		Shapiro
	Toni Zeltzer	Liberal	13 September 2011	27 September 2012	1 year, 14 days		Wynne
	Katherine O'Regan	Liberal	27 September 2012	19 September 2013	1 year, 356 days		Petrie
	Katherine O'Regan	Liberal	19 September 2013	18 September 2014	1 year, 356 days		Zeltzer
	Greg Levenston	Liberal	18 September 2014	21 September 2015	1 year, 3 days		Zeltzer
	Susan Wynne	Liberal	21 September 2015	25 September 2017	3 years, 3 days		Zeltzer
	Susan Wynne	Liberal	25 September 2017	24 September 2018	3 years, 3 days		Cavanagh
	Mary-Lou Jarvis	Liberal	24 September 2018	23 September 2019	364 days		Cavanagh
	Richard Shields	Liberal	23 September 2019	5 January 2022	2 years, 104 days		Wynne
	Isabelle Shapiro	Liberal	5 January 2022	26 September 2023	1 year, 264 days		Wynne
	Sarah Swan	Liberal	26 September 2023	9 October 2024	1 Year, 13 Days		Shields
	Sean Carmichael	Liberal	9 October 2024	28 September 2026	2 years, 44 days		Swan
	Hugh Woodgate	Liberal	28 September 2026	Incumbent	55 days		Swan
