= Double Bay Compressed Air Ejector Station =

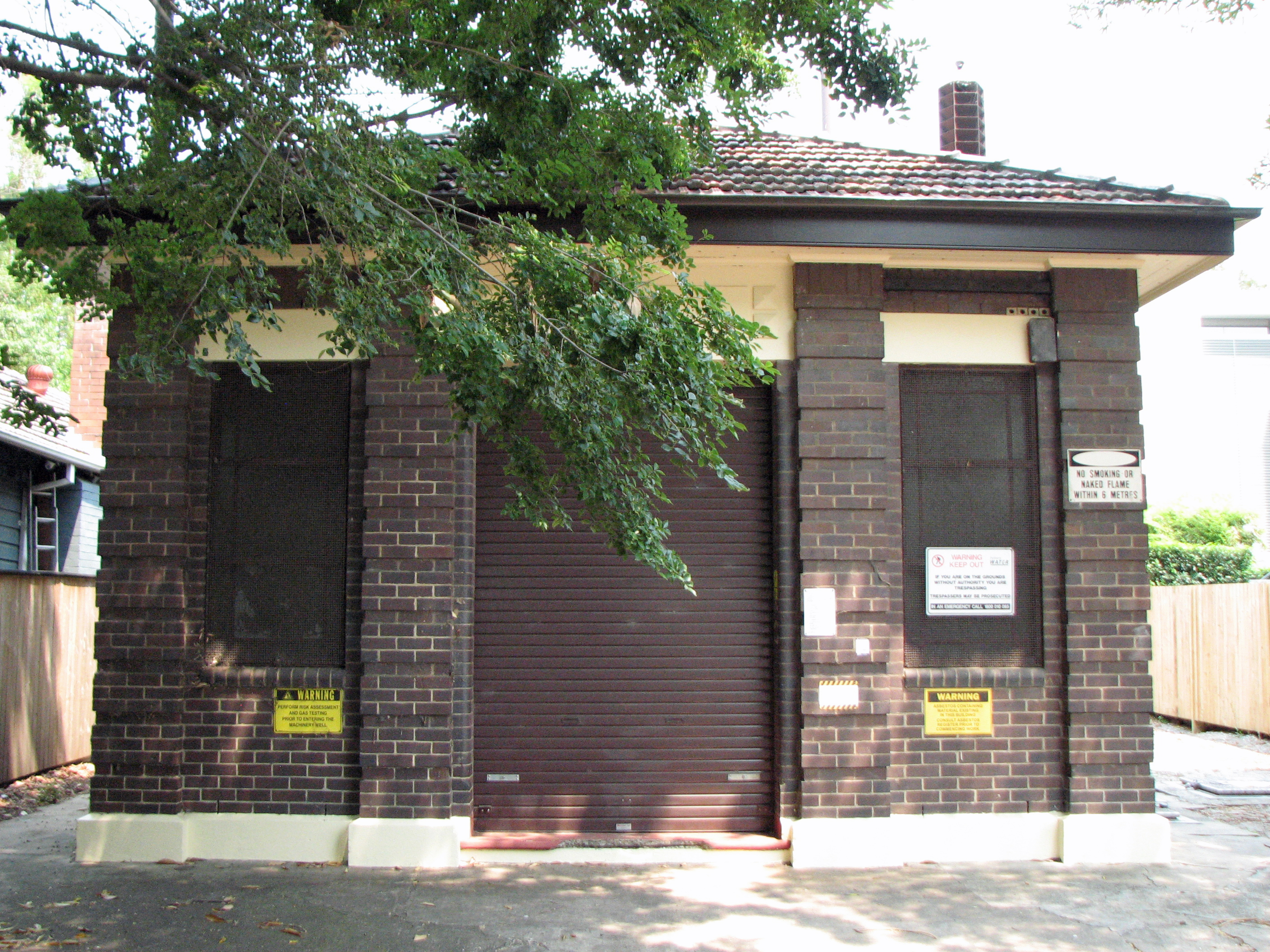
- Double Bay Compressed Air Ejector Station

- Location within Sydney Location within Australia
- 33°52′37″S 151°14′41″E
- Location: Cross Street, Double Bay, Municipality of Woollahra, New South Wales, Australia

History
- Built: 1895–1896

Site notes
- Architect: New South Wales Department of Public Works
- Owner: Sydney Water

New South Wales Heritage Register
- Official name: Double Bay Compressed Air Ejector Station; Double Bay Sewage Ejector Station No 1 (decommissioned)
- Type: State heritage (built)
- Designated: 18 November 1999
- Reference no.: 1324
- Type: Other - Utilities - Sewerage
- Category: Utilities - Sewerage
- Builders: New South Wales Department of Public Works

The Double Bay Compressed Air Ejector Station is a heritage-listed former sewage pumping station (SPS87) and now decommissioned sewerage infrastructure in Jamberoo Lane, Double Bay, adjacent to the rear boundary of 63 William Street, in the Municipality of Woollahra local government area of New South Wales, Australia. The site of the pumping station and the State Heritage Register curtilage is shown on SHR:01324–Plan 2019, reproduced on the internet page referenced here.

The Ejector Station was designed and built from 1895 to 1896 by the New South Wales Department of Public Works. It is also known as Double Bay Sewage Ejector Station No. 1 (decommissioned). The property is owned by Sydney Water, an agency of the Government of New South Wales. It was added to the New South Wales State Heritage Register on 18 November 1999.

== History ==
In 1859, Sydney's sewerage system consisted of five outfall sewers which drained to Sydney Harbour.

By the 1870s, the harbour had become grossly polluted and, as a result, the government established the Sydney City and Suburban Health Board to investigate an alternative means of disposing of the City's sewage. This led to the construction of two gravitation sewers in 1889 by the Public Works Department (PWD): a northern sewer being the Bondi Ocean Outfall Sewer (BOOS) and a southern sewer draining to a sewage farm at Botany Bay.

Low-lying areas around the Harbour which could not gravitate to the new outfall sewers continued to drain to the old City Council sewers. Low-level pumping stations were therefore needed to collect the sewage from such areas and pump it by means of additional sewers known as rising mains, to the main gravitation system. The first low-level area serviced was in Double Bay, where the PWD constructed five compressed air ejectors in 1898 and which served the BOOS until 1929.

The first comprehensive low-level sewerage system began at the beginning of the 20th century when the Public Works Department built a group of 20 low-level pumping stations around the foreshores of the inner harbour and handed them over to the Metropolitan Board of Water Supply and Sewerage in 1904. Overall, greater Sydney now has over 600 low-level sewage pumping stations.

== Description ==
The Double Bay Sewage Ejector Station No. 1 is located under the road surface of Cross Street. It consists of a steel caisson approximately 3 metres (9.8 ft) diameter which received sewage through a reflux valve. When full, a float operated valve then allows compressed air to pressurise the vessel, closing the inlet reflux valve and forcing the sewage up the rising main into a receiving manhole on the main gravity sewer. The depth from road surface to the top of the ejector equipment is 3.35 metres (11.0 ft). The compressor station was located near the intersection of Bay Street and New South Head Road.

The steel caisson is 2.97 metres (9 ft 9 in) wide and carries the inscription, "Pope Maher and Co Sydney 1896 Darlington Iron Works". Other inscriptions on the equipment read, "Shone and Aults Patent Manufactured by Hughes and Lancaster London Nos. 438 and 447, 1896".

=== Modifications and dates ===
The steel caisson has been filled with sand.

== Heritage listing ==
As at 24 August 2005, Double Bay Sewage Ejector Station No. 1 remains is of historic and technical/research significance. Historically, it was the first low level sewage pumping station constructed to serve Sydney in 1898 and is the only surviving ejector station of the five originally built to serve Double Bay. It is also significant for its historically integral association with the Bondi Ocean Outfall Sewer which it served. It has high scientific significance, having educational potential to reveal information about the shone ejector principle of lifting sewage by means of compressed air, which was superseded by present-day electrical pumps. The remnant fabric is now unique and of high archaeological value.

Double Bay Compressed Air Ejector Station was listed on the New South Wales State Heritage Register on 18 November 1999 having satisfied the following criteria.

The place is important in demonstrating the course, or pattern, of cultural or natural history in New South Wales.

The Double Bay Sewage Ejector Station No. 1 site is the only known remaining Shone Ejector Station of five which were constructed by the PWD in 1896 and the immediately following years. It is associated histrocially with the Bondi Ocean Outfall Sewer, which it served. This marked the beginning of the provision of sewerage for Sydney's low level areas.

The place is important in demonstrating aesthetic characteristics and/or a high degree of creative or technical achievement in New South Wales.

Item is an underground station and does not have any notable outstanding aesthetic values.

The place has potential to yield information that will contribute to an understanding of the cultural or natural history of New South Wales.

The station has high educational potential to reveal information about the ejector principle, which was at its time an effective system for pumping liquids with a high solid content that was superseded by modern, special purpose electrical pumps.

The place possesses uncommon, rare or endangered aspects of the cultural or natural history of New South Wales.

The Double Bay Ejector Station No. 1 (and its remaining fabric and components) are unique as the first low level station to serve Sydney and is the only known remaining Shone Ejector of the five constructed in Double Bay.

The place is important in demonstrating the principal characteristics of a class of cultural or natural places/environments in New South Wales.

The Double Bay Ejector Station No. 1 is a representative example of a low level sewage pumping station with a Shone Ejector.

== See also ==
- Bondi Ocean Outfall Sewer
- Media related to Double Bay Compressed Air Ejector Station at Wikimedia Commons
