= Double Bay =

- Suburb
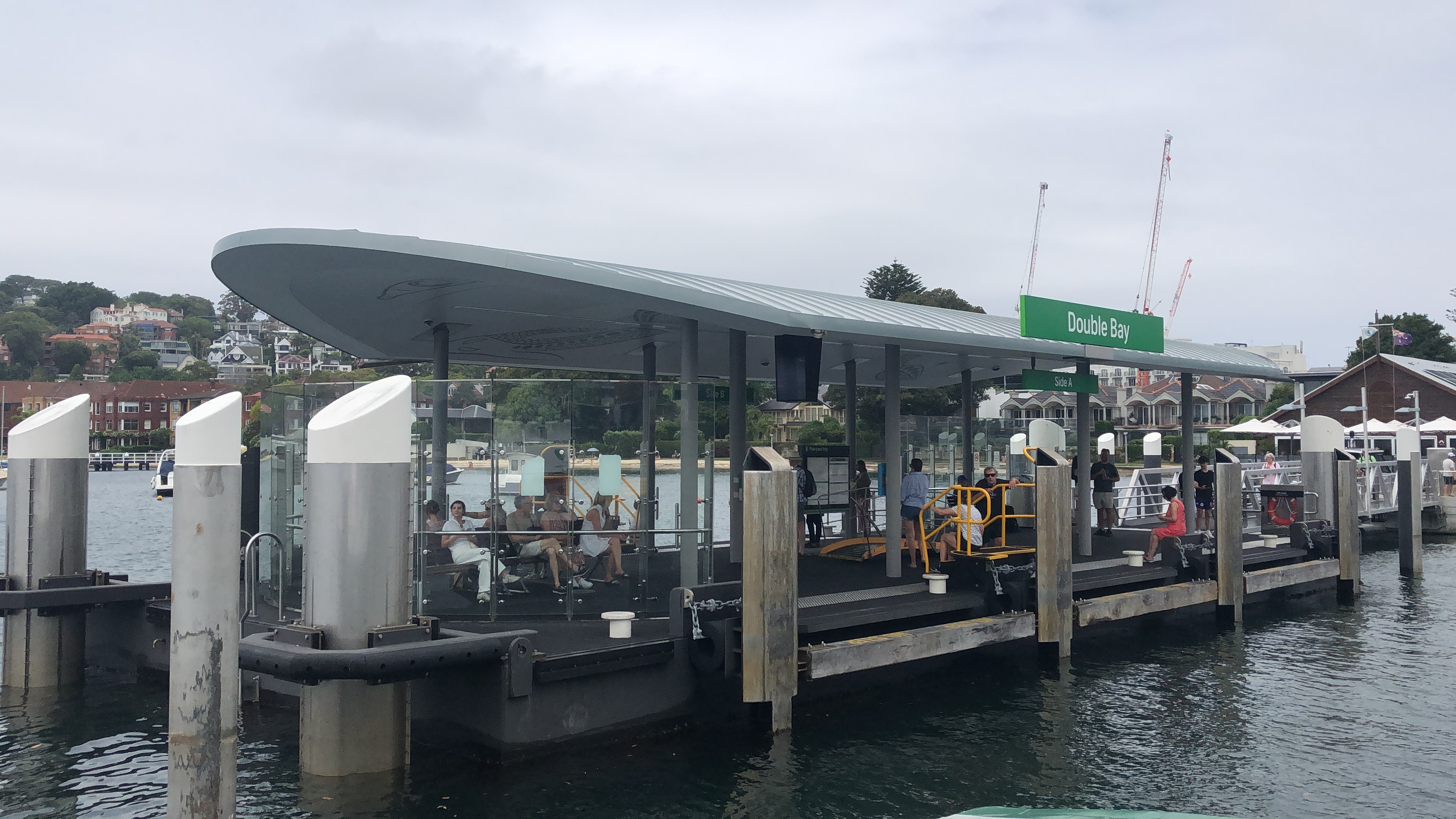
- Double Bay ferry wharf

- Interactive map of Double Bay
- Country: Australia
- State: New South Wales
- City: Sydney
- LGA: Woollahra Council
- Location: 4 km (2.5 mi) E of Sydney CBD

Government
  - State electorate: Vaucluse
  - Federal division: Wentworth

Area
  - Total: 0.79 km^{2} (0.31 sq mi)
- Elevation: 10 m (33 ft)

Population
  - Total: 4,709 (SAL 2021)
- Postcode: 2028
Suburbs around Double Bay
	Port Jackson
Darling Point	Double Bay	Point Piper
Edgecliff	Woollahra	Bellevue Hill

Double Bay is a harbourside eastern suburb of Sydney, in the state of New South Wales, Australia 4 kilometres east of the Sydney central business district. It is the administrative centre of the local government area of the Municipality of Woollahra.

Double Bay takes its name from the bay of Sydney Harbour and refers to the two geographical formations between Point Piper and Darling Point, which are interrupted by a miniature point in between. The eastern part is also known as Blackburn Cove. It has some of the most expensive real-estate in Australia and is colloquially often referred to as "Double Pay", a term coined due to the high income of people living there, and the nature of the shopping area which features high-end fashion labels.

== History ==
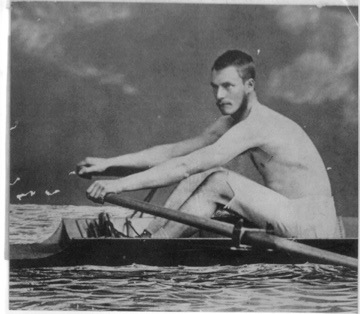
Charles Amos Messenger – Champion Sculler of Victoria, Australia and pioneer boatbuilder of Double Bay

Double Bay developed soon after initial European settlement in 1788. In the early years of the colony, Double Bay was used as shelter for fishermen who would regularly fish around the harbour. Farming mostly cattle and lettuce, a farm had developed, and by 1814 it had expanded to envelop the valleys leading into Woollahra, Bondi Junction, Bellevue Hill, and Point Piper.

Charles Amos Messenger became the sculling champion of Victoria on 1 July 1878, Rowing Champion of New Zealand in 1881, and a contender for the sculling championship of the world in 1887. Charles Amos also established the first boatshed on Sydney Harbour at Balmain, from where it was later transferred by flotation to Double Bay. The early life of Double Bay revolved around the Messenger boatshed.

Charles Amos was the father of rugby league and rugby union player Dally Messenger, and Wally Messenger, who also played Rugby League for Australia. From their boatshed the Messenger brothers would row people across Sydney Harbour, including William Bede Dalley, the acting premier of New South Wales in 1885, who owned a castle in Manly.

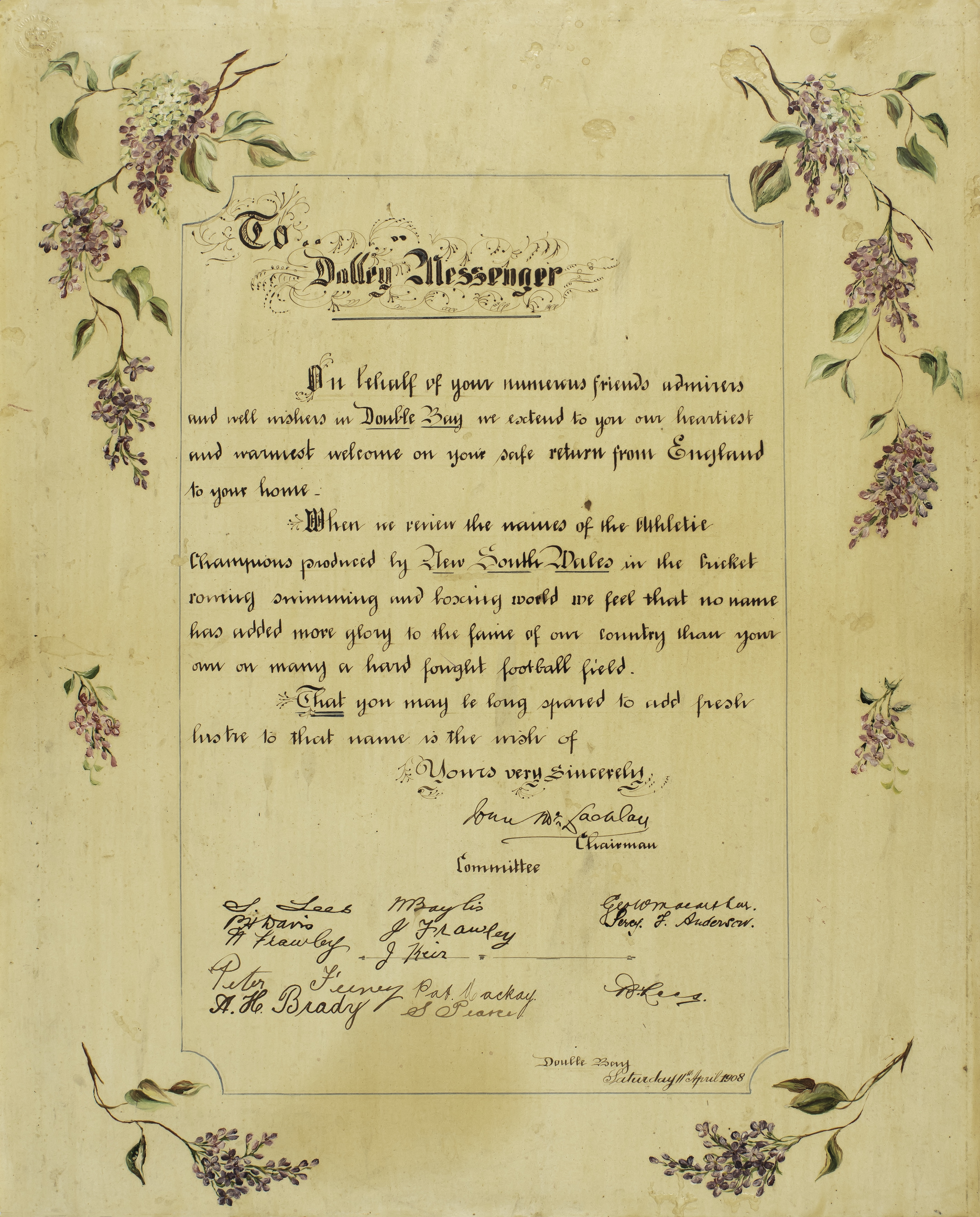
Dally Messenger 1908 Civic Reception Scroll. It contains the words "When we review the names of the Athletic Champions produced by New South Wales in the cricket, rowing, swimming and boxing world we feel that no name has added more glory to the fame of our country than your own".

== Heritage listings ==
Double Bay has a number of heritage-listed sites, including:

- Cross Street: Double Bay Compressed Air Ejector Station
- 11 Gladswood Gardens: Gladswood House
- 337–347 New South Head Road: Overthorpe (Double Bay)
- 560 New South Head Road: Fairwater (Double Bay)
- 4 and 6 Wiston Gardens, Double Bay: Houses

== Demographics ==
According to the 2021 census, there were 4,709 residents in Double Bay. 60.6% of people were born in Australia; the next most common countries of birth included England 6.0%, South Africa 3.8%, New Zealand 2.8%, China (excluding Special Administrative Regions and Taiwan) 2.0%, and the United States of America 1.6%. 79.2% of people only spoke English at home; the next most common languages at home included Mandarin 2.3%, Spanish 1.4%, Cantonese 1.3%, French 1.2%, and Italian 1.1%. The most common ancestries in Double Bay included English 32.1%, Australian 24.4%, Irish 13.4%, Scottish 9.2%, and Chinese 5.8%. The most common responses for religion were No Religion 37.4%, Catholic 19.5%, Judaism 13.9%, and Anglican 14.7%; a further 6.1% of respondents elected not to disclose their religion.

Average household income was about $3,077 compared to $1,746 nationally, personal income was $1,662 compared to $805 nationally, and family income was $4,250 compared to $2,120 nationally. The median rent in this area was $720, and the average monthly mortgage repayment was $3,000. The majority of dwellings in this area were flats or apartments at 76.6% followed by separate houses at 13.4%, semi-detached, row or terrace houses, townhouses etc at 8.9%, and all other dwellings at 1.0%.

== Commercial area ==
The commercial area runs along New South Head Road and extends along surrounding streets of Knox Street, Cross Street and Bay Street. It features hotels and shopping, restaurants, supermarkets, offices and coffee shops.

== Transport ==
Double Bay features a ferry wharf for Double Bay ferry services with regular services to Circular Quay and Darling Point. Bus services operate via New South Head Road to Bondi Junction, Watsons Bay and the City. The closest railway station is Edgecliff on New South Head Road.

== Sport and recreation ==
Double Bay's former residents include Dally Messenger, one of the most famous rugby league players of all time who was born, raised, and lived most of his life in Double Bay. He attended Double Bay primary school and became a local celebrity in the first half of the 20th century.

== Gallery ==
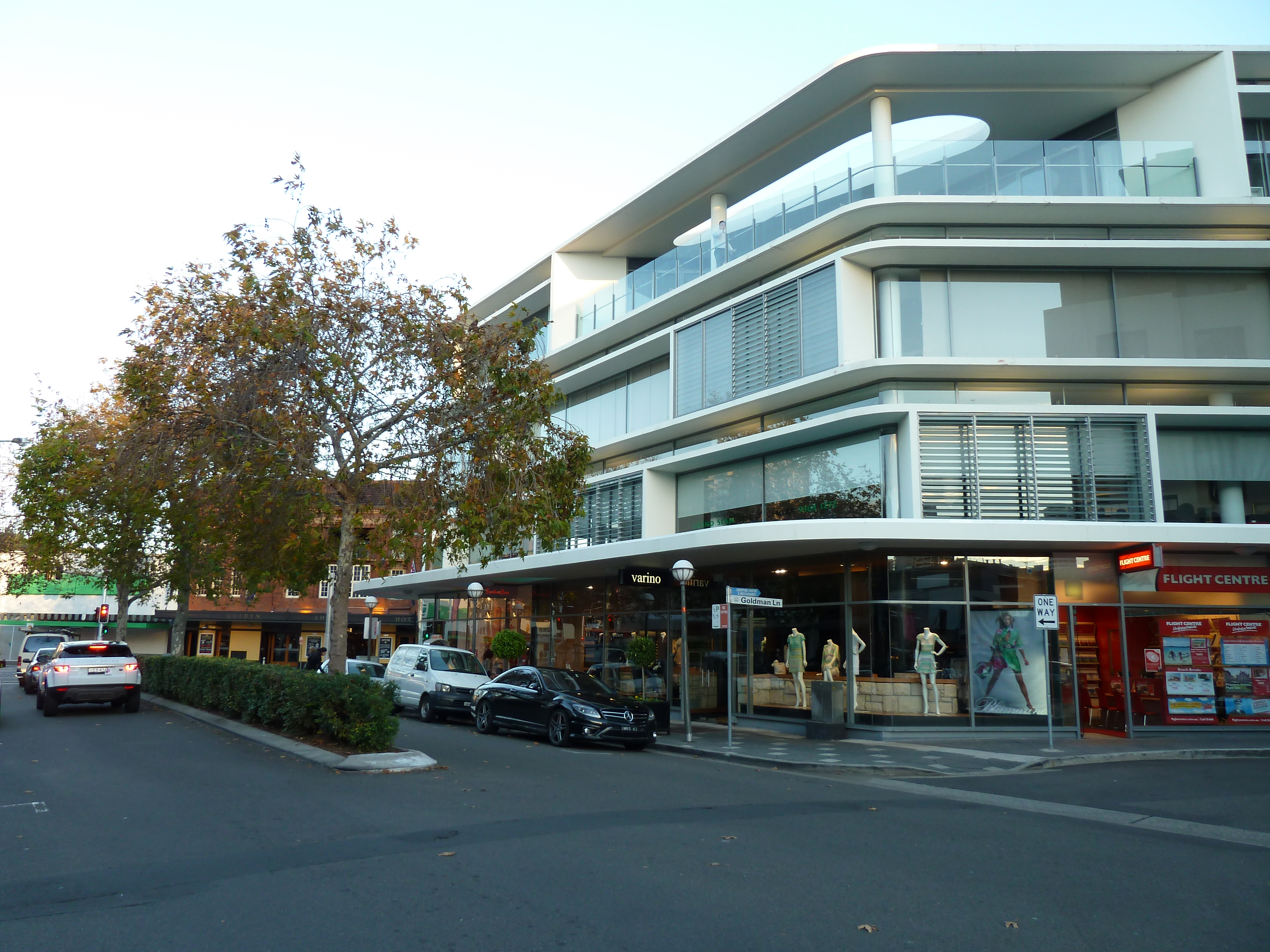
Knox Street

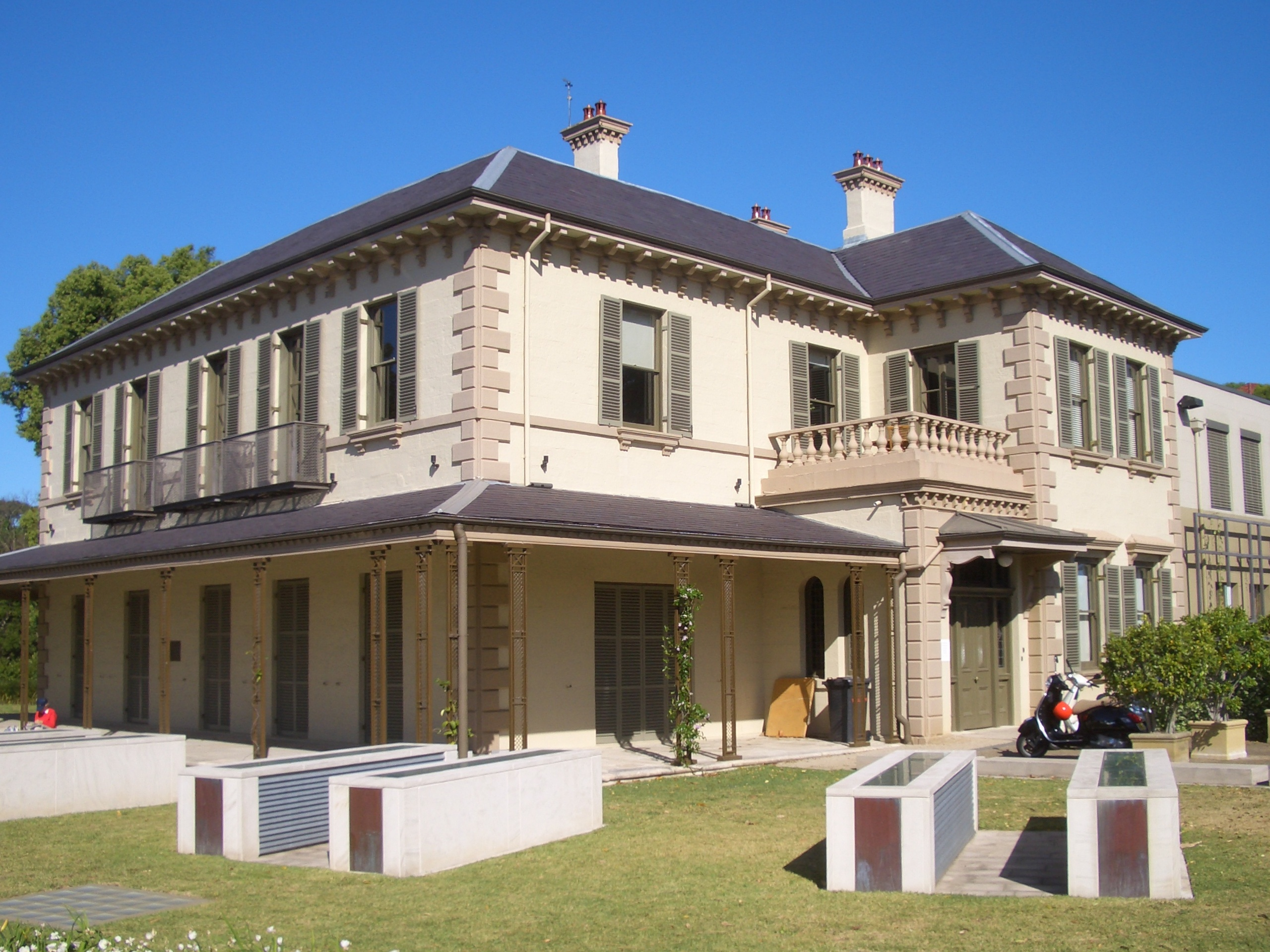
Municipality of Woollahra council chambers

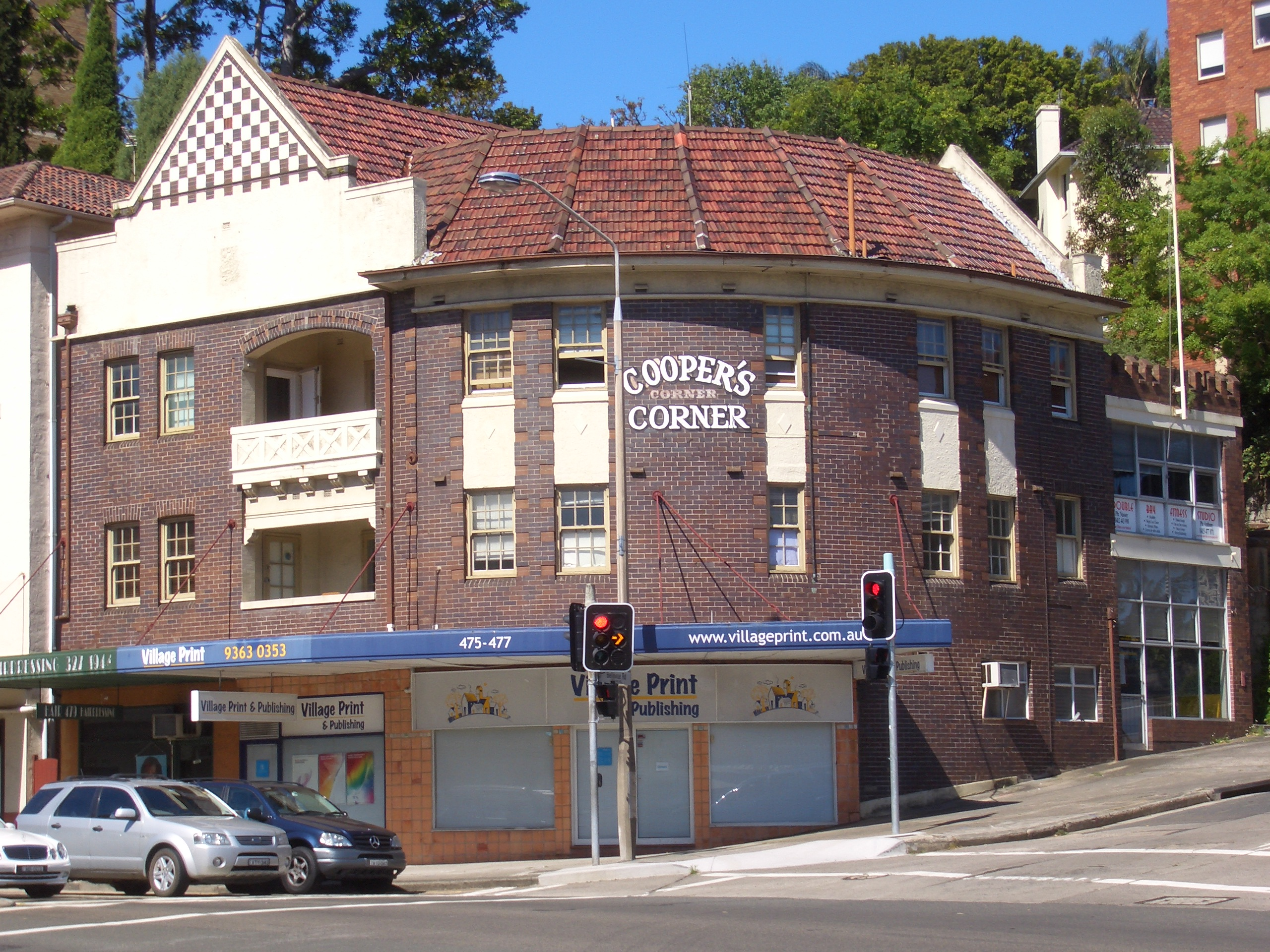
Coopers Corner

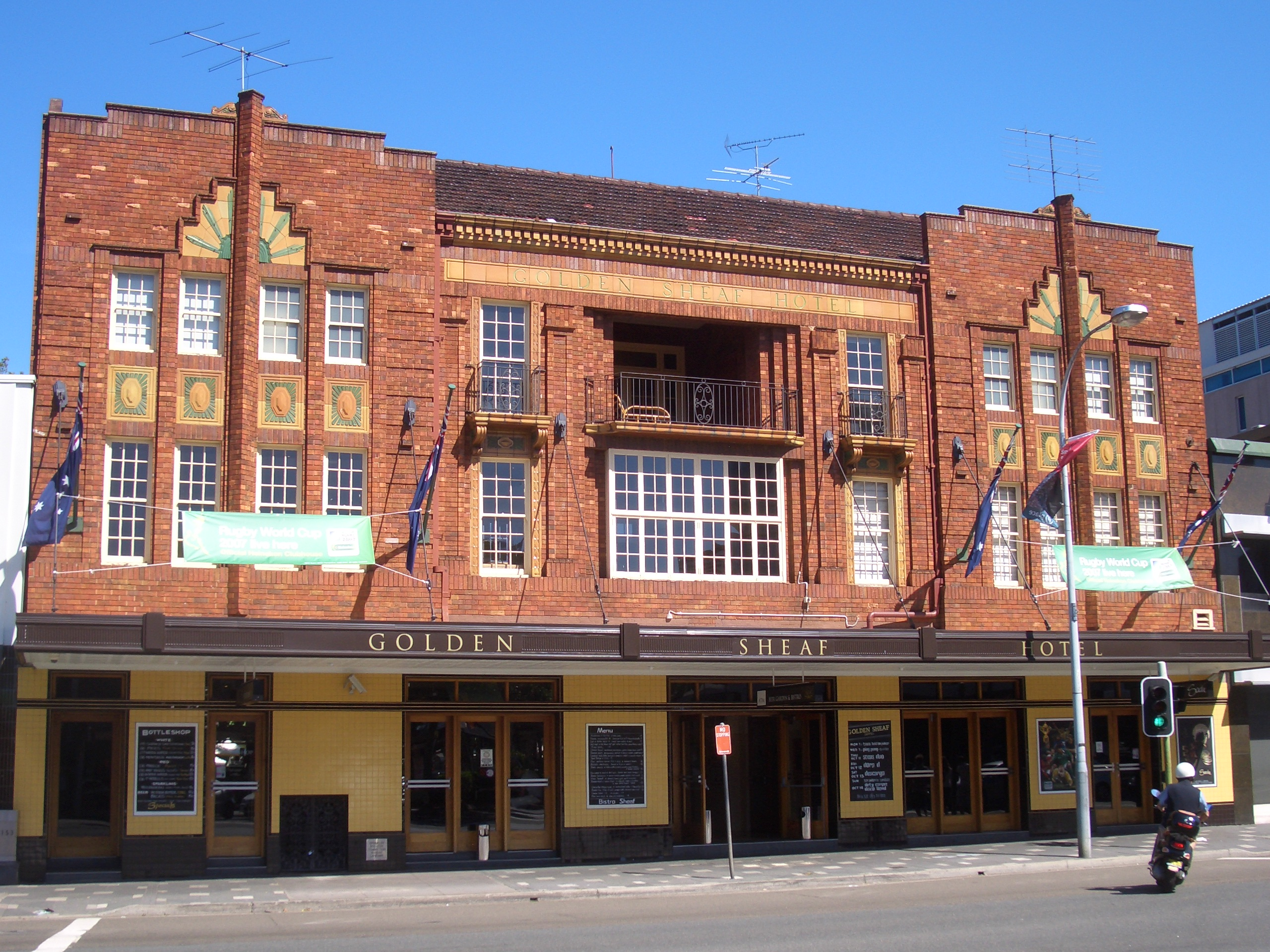
Golden Sheaf Hotel

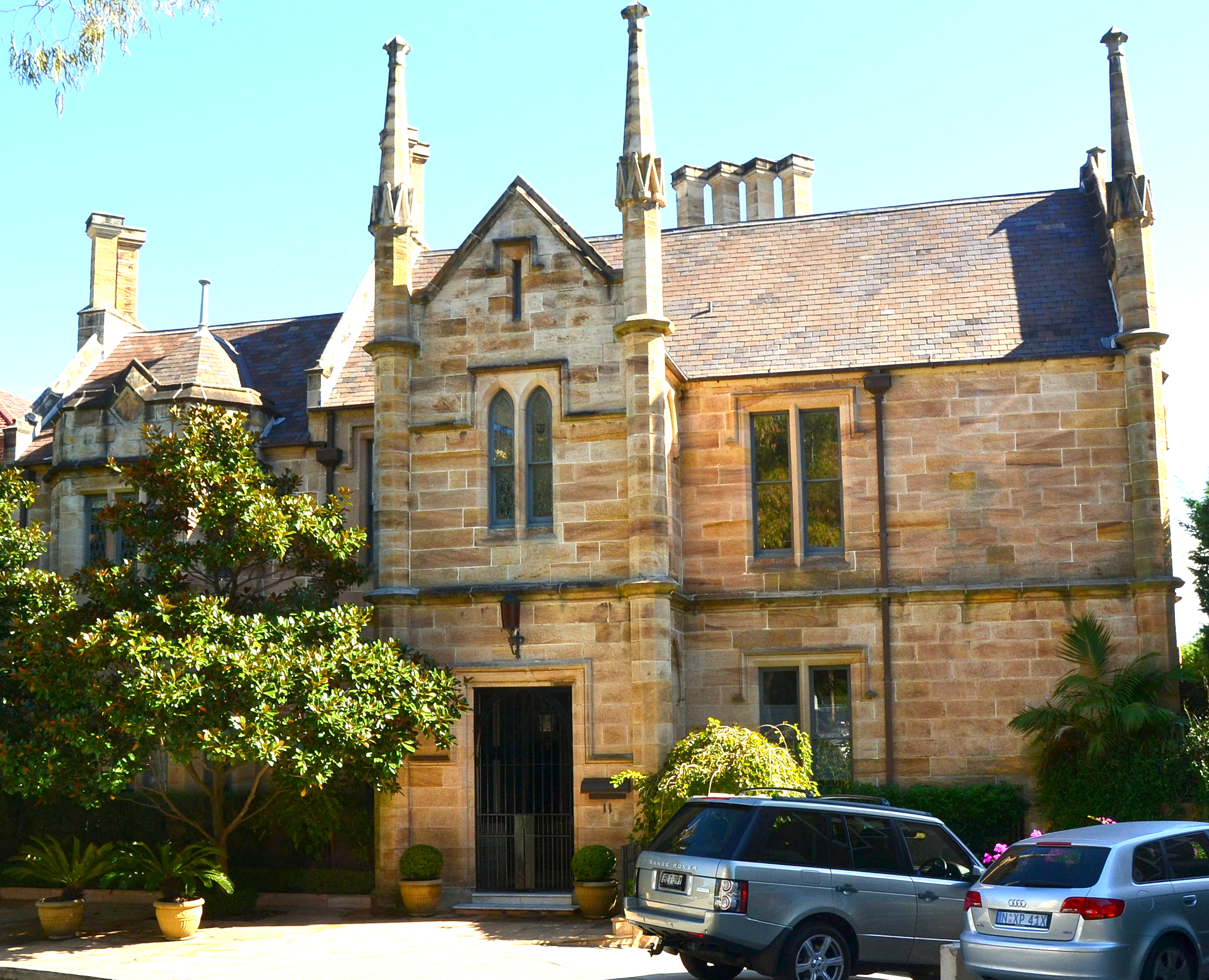
Heritage-listed Gladswood House (1856)

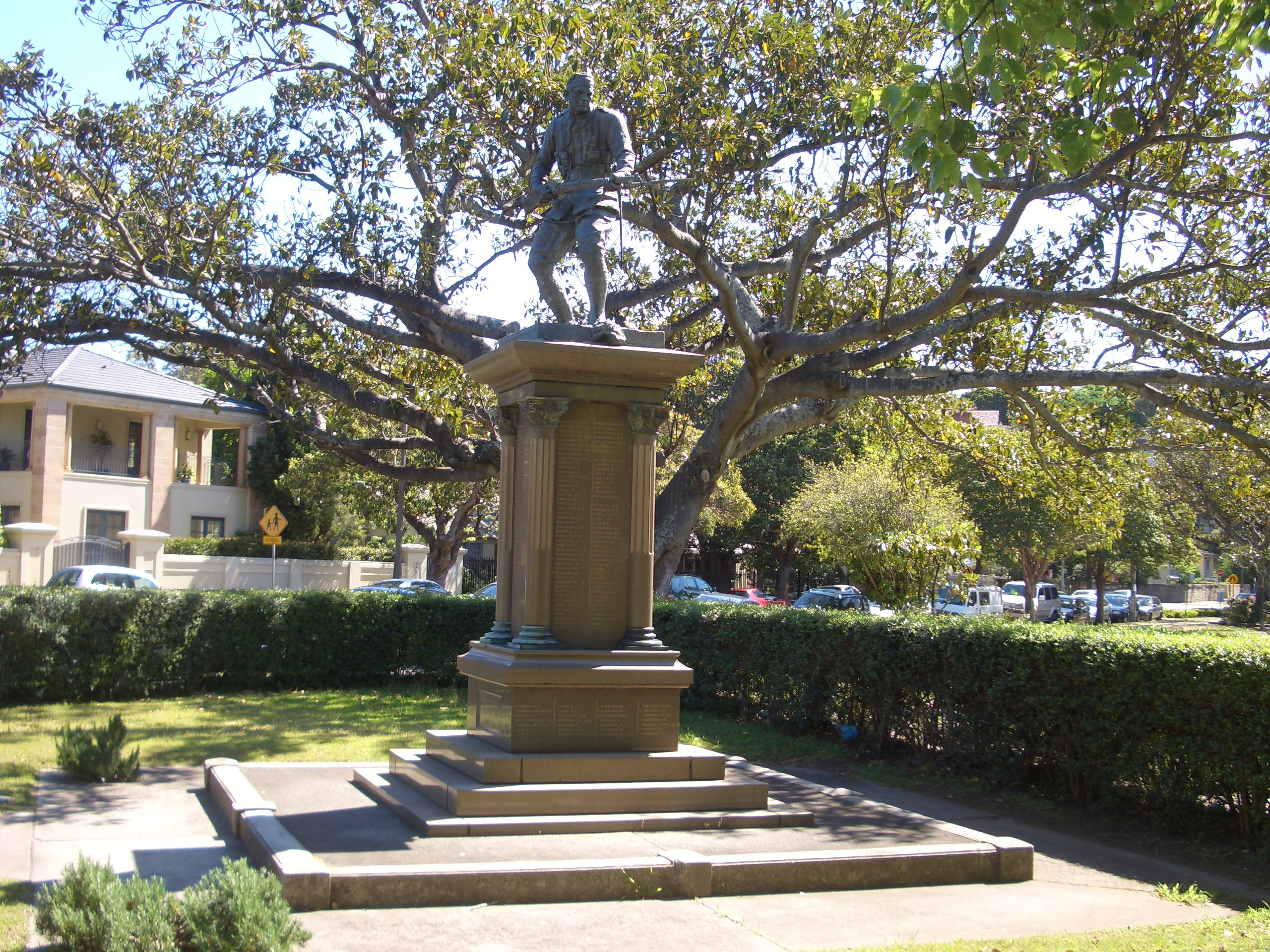
Steyne Park war memorial

== Notable residents ==
- John Christian Watson (1867–1941), first Australian Labor Prime Minister and third Prime Minister of Australia
- Clements Frederick Vivian Jackson (1873–1955), an Australian mining engineer
- Emma Linda Palmer Littlejohn (1883–1949), feminist, journalist and radio commentator
- Sandy Pearce (1883–1930), rugby league footballer and boxer, after whom Pearce Street is named.
- Charlene Todman (1931–2018), early Australian disability sportsperson
- Mary Fairfax (1922–2017), at her estate "Fairwater" philanthropist and businesswomen
