= Overthorpe, Double Bay =

Residential complex in New South Wales, Australia

Overthorpe
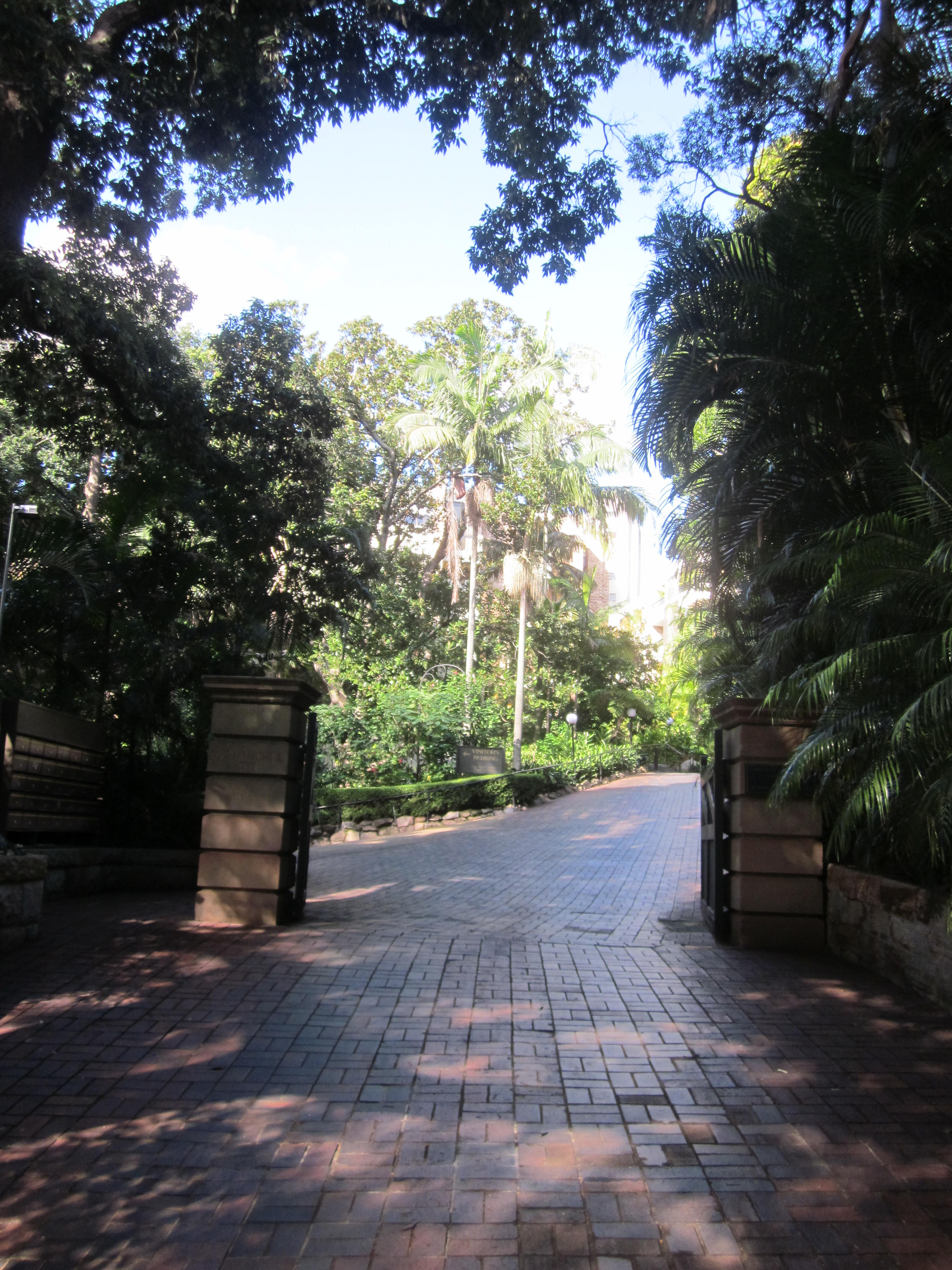
- Entrance to Overthorpe

- Location within Sydney Location within Australia
- 33°52′45″S 151°14′28″E
- Location: 337-347 New South Head Road, Double Bay, Sydney, New South Wales, Australia

History
- Built: 1900–1906

New South Wales Heritage Register
- Official name: Overthorpe; Sir John Hay's garden (part of it) (former)
- Type: State heritage (landscape)
- Designated: 2 April 1999
- Reference no.: 246
- Type: Garden Residential
- Category: Parks, Gardens and Trees

Overthorpe is a heritage-listed former residence and grounds and now multi-unit residential complex and grounds at 337-347 New South Head Road, Double Bay, Sydney, New South Wales, Australia. It was built from 1900 to 1906. It is also known as part of the former Sir John Hay's garden. The property is privately owned. It was added to the New South Wales State Heritage Register on 2 April 1999.

== History ==
The site was formerly part of Sir John Hay's experimental garden, which covered much of the eastern hill face of Edgecliff/Double Bay (an unusual listing in the 1880 Sands Directory, at the time Sir John Hay resided in Rose Bay Lodge (now Rose Bay Cottage)), running from Ocean Street on the ridge (western boundary) to Manning Street, Double Bay (in the east). Hay was the NSW Colonial Treasurer and owned the property prior to the construction of Overthorpe. He was also vice-president of the Agricultural Society of NSW (1860–1865; 1868–1881; 1888–1889); and vice-president of NSW commissions for International Exhibitions at Philadelphia, Paris, Sydney and Amsterdam, roles consistent with 19th century ambitions to cultivate an "experimental" garden.

=== Sir John Hay ===
Sir John Hay (1816-1892), pastoralist and politician, was born on 22 June 1816 at Little Ythsie, Aberdeenshire, Scotland, son of John Hay, farmer, and his wife Jean, née Mair. Educated at King's College, Aberdeen (M.A., 1834), he studied law in Edinburgh but abandoned it. In 1838 he married Mary, née Chalmers. They arrived in Sydney on 1 July in the Amelia Thompson, and soon settled at Welaregang on the Upper Murray. In partnership with his brother-in-law, James Chalmers, he was a very successful squatter. In 1840 Philip Gidley King arranged for Strzelecki to visit Welaregang and wrote to Hay: "I fancy your zeal for such excursions will induce you to accompany him". Active in local affairs, Hay strongly opposed border duties on goods crossing the Murray River. In 1856 he was elected as "a conservative and squatting representative" for the Murrumbidgee to the first New South Wales Legislative Assembly. He carried a motion of no confidence against Charles Cowper's first ministry and attacked the legality of appointing James Martin attorney-general. Hay declined to form a ministry himself and recommended (Sir) Henry Parker, whom he joined as secretary of lands and works in 1856–1857. His squatter-oriented land bill was stillborn but in 1857-59 he retained his seat and in 1859 won the Murray. In 1860 he strongly opposed (Sir) John Robertson's land bills and carried his amendment to ensure survey before selection. At the ensuing general election he was one of Robertson's few opponents to be re-elected.

David Buchanan deplored Hay's "artificial and affected" manner, but admitted that "as an Opposition leader, Mr. Hay conducts his opposition in a manly, dignified, and honourable way If he attacks the NSW Government, it is on some great and constitutional question-not on the appointment of two or three policemen". When Hay was elected Speaker on 14 October 1862 Governor Sir Henry Young reported that he was of the "very first standing in the Colony in point of fortune, manners, education and character". Hay won the respect of all parties for impartial discharge of his duties. In 1864 his opposition to Riverina separation led him to give up his Murray seat and he won Central Cumberland. He resigned as Speaker in 1865 and from the assembly in 1867 when appointed to the New South Wales Legislative Council.

Although Hay had lived in Sydney since 1856 he maintained his Murrumbidgee runs. He was chairman of the Mercantile Bank of Sydney and a director of the Australian Mutual Provident Society and the European Assurance Society. In 1872 he refused to join Henry Parkes' ministry but next year became president of the Legislative Council on Parkes' recommendation. Worried by the frequent lack of a quorum, in 1874 he had the size of the council increased In 1879 he told Sir Edward Deas Thomson of "unpleasant relations with the Assembly, partly from a little injudicious management of details by those who have taken the lead amongst us, but chiefly I fear from a spirit of hostility to the Council on the part of leading men in the House". Believing that the duty of the council was to assist the government unless some important principle was involved, Hay was unremitting in his efforts to get "laws passed in the best form possible". Ever jealous of the council's dignity, he complained to the governor of "sacrilege" after (Sir) Alexander Stuart's government had put seventy-five beds in the council chamber during an all-night debate on the land bill in 1884.

Hay had many honorary duties: besides speaking at innumerable banquets he was vice-president of the New South Wales commissions for exhibitions at Philadelphia, Paris, Sydney and Amsterdam. He was president of the Highland Society of New South Wales and vice-president of the Agricultural Society of New South Wales and the Australian Club and a founder of the Union Club. He was appointed KCMG in 1878 and in 1879 members of the Legislative Council commissioned Achille Simonetti to sculpture his bust. Parkes wrote of Hay that "Among Conservatives he would be held to be a Liberal; among extreme Democrats he would be regarded as a Conservative". In the Freeman's Journal, 16 September 1882, "Cassius" discerned his 'pragmatical shrewdness apt at a moment's notice to degenerate into meanness, a vision very narrow, but very sharp, a reverence for No. 1 exceedingly profound'. Hay died without issue at Rose Bay on 20 January 1892 and was buried by an Anglican clergyman in the Presbyterian section of Waverley Cemetery. His wife died ten days later. Most of his estate of almost A£59,000 was left to the children of his brother James. The Riverina town of Hay is named in his honour.

Hay's garden contained a gardener's cottage and is believed to have been the site of an experimental nursery. The selection of species suggests a possible link with William Guilfoyle's Exotic Nursery, Double Bay (very nearby) as well as the general interest in rainforest species engendered by Charles Moore, Director of the Royal Botanic Garden, Sydney (1848–96). Magnificent specimens of great age and scale are testament to the 19th century passion for collecting and displaying rare and exotic trees.

=== William Guilfoyle's nursery ===
Of special note is the concentration of these kinds of species of plants in this part of Double Bay. This site is in close proximity to Ocean Avenue and this is a most historically important precinct for the occurrence of significant trees. The area contains a remarkable diversity of very old ornamental and particularly Australian rainforest and Pacific Island species, believed to reflect the early influence of Guilfoyle's plantings dating to the middle of the 19th century.

William Guilfoyle established and with his sons ran the "Exotic Nursery" east of Ocean Avenue ("three and a half acres on the flat") in 1851 and they possibly resided at 37 South Avenue, Double Bay, now the corner of Ocean Avenue, between 1855 and 1876. During this time the nursery's catalogue listed "jacaranda, araucarias (amongst 130 species of conifers), date palms, nikau palms from New Zealand, coconut palms from Brazil and the East Indies, Bangalow and cabbage tree palms of the Illawarra, tree ferns from Norfolk Island and many Pacific Island plants." This list gives an insight into the diversity of available species by the middle of the 19th century and also some understanding of the cultural and historical plantings in this area. Furthermore, his son Michael Guilfoyle, collected plants throughout the South Pacific and NSW North Coast rainforests of the Cudgen area and the planting in this locality reflects this long family interest in exotic plants. The Exotic Nursery had well known large display gardens Guilfoyle also worked at the famous nearby garden of Greenoaks (now Bishopscourt) for Thomas Sutcliffe Mort.

=== Development of the mansion ===
Overthorpe house was built c. 1900 and it was already a landmark property when it was bought in 1915 by William Anderson who had made his fortune in the hat trade from Akubra hats. Large grounds surrounded the two-storey mansion presenting an excellent example of this period's domestic landscaping.

The main entrance (drive) was historically a milk-carter's track linking several properties in the area. The sandstone boundary wall to New South Head Road was found (on inspection by experts) to have convict markings showing it could be traced back to early residential developments in and around Sydney Cove. This wall is a significant landmark in Double Bay.

Overthorpe house's panelled rooms were the setting for many gracious parties and balls over the years and notable personalities entertained there included the Duke of Edinburgh. Anderson, owner from 1915 apparently had a fine garden and did not die until 1967. An aerial photograph taken in 1943 shows the site as very heavily vegetated at that time. The large, rambling Federation mansion in 1.0 hectare (2.5 acres) of beautiful grounds was left to the Catholic Church in 1967 by Anderson. Overthorpe was willed to the Catholic Church, which is to auction the property on 23 March 1979. The area of land is 7,575 square metres (81,540 sq ft).

An interim conservation order was placed on the gardens in 1979 by the NSW Minister for Planning and the Environment, but this did not include the house. The mansion was demolished in June 1980. A permanent conservation order was gazetted (for Overthorpe's gardens and improvements including the service driveway, stone wall on the front boundary to New South Head Road and front entrance gates) on 4 February 1983.

=== Demolition and development of apartment complex ===
The house was demolished for a Mirvac-built double apartment complex in the late 1970s. Its grounds were preserved as a condition of this development, testament to their horticultural and aesthetic significance at a time when heritage value was only just beginning to be appreciated.

In 2015 Woollahra Municipal Council and the chair of its Plaques Committee unveiled a new bronze footpath plaque outside Overthorpe to Sir John Hay. Hay, MLA was Colonial Treasurer and owned the property prior to the construction of Overthorpe. He was vice-president of the Agricultural Society of NSW (1860–1865; 1868–1881; 1888–1889 and also vice-president of NSW commissions for international exhibitions at Philadelphia, Paris, Sydney and Amsterdam, roles consistent with 19th century ambitions to cultivate an "experimental" garden. His garden contained a gardener's cottage and is believed to have been the site of an experimental nursery.

== Description ==
=== Mansion (demolished) ===
Overthorpe was a large two-storey Federation mansion (demolished in 1981) built in c. 1900 and acquired in 1915 for William Anderson who had made his fortune in the hat trade. The mansion is carefully considered in terms of siting, as it was built on a rise to command a view across the main northern gardens to the harbour.

=== Apartment buildings ===
The property presently contains two Mirvac apartment buildings, centrally located and towards the rear (south of the block), which replaced the original two storey federation mansion in 1981.

=== Grounds - location, layout and component parts ===
The site comprises c. 1.6 hectares (4 acres). The mature vegetation of Overthorpe is prominent in views from the Double Bay shops.

Located below the ridgeline and Edgecliff Road, the site's elevated position visually presents a lush vegetated hill slope dominated by massive rainforest (tree) canopies and emergent Araucaria (pines). This very sheltered location, with deep sandy soils and a north-easterly aspect, has one of the finest and most equitable micro-climates in the Municipality, allowing maximum development of sub-tropical and even tropical species. The original vegetation would most likely also have included a local rainforest component and a number of these remnant species are still present in the area.

The gardens of Overthorpe, the neighbouring 5 Manning Road, and the right-of-way to 349 New South Head Road, together support among the largest botanical collections of exotic Australian rainforest species in Woollahra Municipality. The site is a historically important precinct for the occurrence of significant trees, containing a remarkable diversity of old ornamental and particularly Australian rainforest and Pacific Island species, believed to reflect the early influence of (Michael) Guilfoyle's plantings dating to the middle of the 19th century.

Historically there was a thick band of planting on the boundaries of the property and a more open character in the centre around first, the mansion and later, the apartment blocks. Today this character is somewhat reversed with more views into the site and a clustering of vegetation and overshadowing immediately adjacent to the buildings.

Large mature grounds surround the (former, demolished Overthorpe) residence presenting an excellent and intact example of the Federation period's domestic landscaping. The mature evergreen trees of camphor laurel (Cinnamomum camphora), pittosporum, figs (Ficus spp.) and Phoenix spp. palms, together with the front stone wall form an important element within the streetscape occurring on a prominent sweep of New South Head Road rising on the western side of Double Bay.

An excellent and intact example of domestic Federation landscaping complete with the mansion (demolished 1980) and period planting of trees, palms and ferns. The grounds and building form an integral design. The front of the house is framed by frangipani (Plumeria rubra cv.) with under plantings of Hydrangea macrophylla and other evergreen shrubs. Dominant elements in the front and side gardens are dense stands of Lord Howe Island/Kentia palms (Howea fosteriana & curly or sentry palm, H.belmoreana) with ground layers of ground cover, being the cast iron plant (Aspidistra elatior). A sandstone boundary wall, of an unknown construction date but dating at least from the "mansion" period of Overthorpe's history defines the northern edge of the property bounding New South Head Road.

Refurbished and relocated gateposts and gates are set partway into the site on the drive at the western end of the property. A pedestrian entrance gate is set into the boundary wall at the eastern, Double Bay, end of the property. The main entrance drive emulates the original alignment of the driveway but is surfaced with modern paving bricks. The former service drive, surfaced in concrete, branches from the main entrance drive and skirts the western side and partway along the southern side of the property. The original sandstone block retaining walls that form the sides of this service drive are an important aesthetic and historic element of the grounds.

The curved approach drive from the New South Head sandstone pillar and timber entrance gates is framed by a evergreen magnolia /bull bay (M.grandiflora) providing a vista to the house and entry flanked by low fan palms and banana-like bird-of-paradise (Strelitzia spp.) plants. Similarly the tradesmen's approach has been skillfully integrated into the overall landscaping plan by screening it with a tree-planted earth bank to create a separate sunken cutting which runs around the perimeter of the gardens to the rear service entrance and the garages.

These rear slopes behind the house are planted with Pittosporum, beech, palms and a large specimen of Himalayan/chir pine, Pinus roxburghii.

==== Palm collection ====
This "rain forest" at Overthorpe supports finest and largest collection of palms in this survey (Woollahra), easily eclipsing the significant palm grove at Vaucluse House gardens and creating in places a dominant palm jungle quality similar to the naturally occurring concentrations of Bangalow palms along the east coast of New South Wales and Qld.. Much of the "palm jungle" remains totally concealed to public view contained within the tree canopy. Although some trees may have been removed with the unit development on the site all those remaining have benefitted from the installation of irrigation and the high level of maintenance of these gardens.

The main groves of palms occur in the eastern garden and western entry drive area with local concentrations of each species, however the Bangalow palm is the dominant species throughout, reaching its greatest development as a single dominant species in the gully area on the adjacent 5 Manning Road "Treetops" property.

Although palms such as cabbage (tree) palms and perhaps even Bangalow palms (Archontophoenix cunninghamiana) may have been endemic to this locality it is unlikely that any of the existing palms are descendants of the original vegetation. These palms are frequently in association with equally mature plantings of ornamental species including:

- Queen (or Cocos Island) palms (Syragus romanzoffianum) from Brazil;
- curly or sentry palms (Howea belmoreana) from Norfolk Island;
- Kentia or Lord Howe Island palms (H.fosteriana);
- Senegal(ese) date palms (Phoenix reclinata);
- American cotton palm (Washingtonia filifera), a tall specimen on the site's east beside an Illawarra flame tree (Brachychiton acerifolium) and the large palm grove.

==== Fig tree collection ====
From New South Head Road, near the intersection with Manning Road, the dominant canopy is from a large holm/holly/evergreen oak (Quercus ilex) from the Mediterranean immediately adjacent to one massive and rare fig tree, small leaved fig (Ficus obliqua) on the western boundary where the driveway enters the property. This fig is of great botanical significance as one of only a four known specimens in the Municipality. Three of the four of these occur on this site, the fourth one is in Babworth, Darling Point's garden). Another feature grouping of two closely planted specimens in the front garden display magnificent buttressing and a mass of coalesced aerial roots.

This fig tree shows evidence of past branch trimming. Ficus obliqua is relatively rare in the Sydney region, but like Eleaocarpus kirtonii (formerly identified as being present on the site) red cedar, Toona ciliata and Brachychiton acerifolius grows in rainforests of Illawarra, a common collecting region for 19th century nurserymen, in addition to growing in northern NSW. Guilfoyle's Exotic Nursery catalogues for 1851 and 1862 list both Ficus "sp. Illawarra" ( possibly F.obliqua) and Brachychiton acerifolius "flammea" and the 1862 catalogue lists a "Clarence River" species of Elaeocarpus.

Two Moreton Bay figs (F.macrophylla), one of magnificent proportions, totally dominate the south-eastern corner of the property. One overhangs the car park of neighbouring Bibaringa, adjacent at 349 New South Head Road. In spite of their size and historical significance these are hemmed in by unit development on all sides, making them less visually significant. In spite of their size and historical significance these are hemmed in by unit development on all sides, making them less visually significant. One of these demonstrates evidence of hard pruning, a very common mid 20th century management practice, but this has not prevented an enormous branch from growing across the driveway of the adjacent property 349 New South Head Road and almost touching the adjacent apartment building "Bibaringa".

==== Other significant trees ====
Apart from the generally larger figs and dominant palm groves, this property contains many individual component and mature specimens of botanical significance. The massing of many rare species forms a rainforest environment.

Large trees such as the sub-tropical and locally rare coolamon / watermelon/ rose apple tree (Syzygium moorei) in the western garden (actually regionally rare: one specimen is known in Rozelle Hospital/Broughton Hall's rainforest garden, Lilyfield) (nearby two other specimens are growing as progeny from this tree) and silver quandong (Elaeocarpus kirtonii) in the eastern garden among the palm grove are both superb specimens, originally from the north-eastern NSW and south-eastern Qld. rainforests. A large evergreen /holm/holly oak (Quercus ilex) grows near the gate / fence corner on New South Head Road.

Apart from the generally larger figs and dominant palm groves, this property contains many individual component and mature specimens of great botanical significance. It is this general massing of many rare species to form a rainforest environment which makes this site very special indeed. Large trees such as the subtropical and locally rare coolamon / water melon / rose apple tree (Syzygium moorei) in the western garden and silver quandong (Elaeocarpus kirtonii) in the eastern garden are both superb specimens, originally from the rainforests of northern NSW and south-eastern Queensland. The red cedar (Toona ciliata, syn.T.australis) and more commonly cultivated rainforest species such as bunya pine (Araucaria bidwillii) in the eastern garden among the palm grove, Illawarra flame trees (Brachychiton acerifolius) and black bean (Castanospermum australe) are all present in the gardens.

The eastern garden also supports one of the largest southern /evergreen magnolias /bull bay trees (Magnolia grandiflora) in the Municipality.

Other ornamental and exotic species include Himalayan or chir pine (Pinus roxburghii), camphor laurel (Cinnamommum camphora) and Himalayan or deodar cedar (Cedrus deodara) and the visually important frontage row of Canary Island date palms (Phoenix canariensis) (fronting New South Head Road). A large tree resembling a coogera (Arytera sp.) a northern NSW rainforest tree is part way along the eastern boundary.

Trees and palms identified as significant were: 3 x small leaved figs (Ficus obliqua) (of only 4 specimens in Woollahra LGA, one other being at Babworth, Darling Point); 2 x Moreton Bay figs (F.macrophylla) in the south-eastern corner (one overhangs the car park of "Bibaringa" adjacent at 349 New South Head Road) 1 x coolamon / water melon / rose apple tree (Syzygium moorei) (and two progeny of this tree, in the site's western side; 1 x silver quandong (Elaeocarpus kirtonii) in the eastern side of the site among the palm grove; 1 x bunya pine (Araucaria bidwillii) also in the eastern side of the site among the palm grove.

Mixed palm groves dominated by:

- Bangalow / piccabeen palms (Archontophoenix cunninghamiana);
- Queen /Cocos Island palms (Syragus romanzoffianum, syn. Arecastrum romanzoffianum);
- Cabbage (tree) palms (Livistona australis);
- 9 x Canary Island date palms (Phoenix canariensis) along the front fence facing New South Head Road. This same list of significant trees was adopted by Woollahra Municipal Council and listed in Woollahra LEP 1995 as heritage items.

A large Port Jackson fig (Ficus rubiginosa) over 130 years old on the southern border of the property. Four large camphor laurel trees (adjacent to apt.2, near electricity box, adjacent to last (eastern) parking bay, west of parking bay 2). One blue Atlas cedar (Cedrus atlantica 'Glauca') in central garden bed opposite parking bays. A brown/Illawarra pine (Podocarpus elatus) near the western boundary.

==== Groundcover planting ====
Ground cover planting includes cast iron plant (Aspidistra elatior) and kaffir lily (Clivea spp.), which were growing on the site prior to the construction of the Mirvac apartment buildings in 1981. Peace lily (Spathiphyllum sp.) has since been added to the general planting palette.

Tree ferns (Cyathea spp.), the spore production of which impacts on some of the residents, dwarf/pygmy date palm (Phoenix roebelenii), bird-of-paradise flower (Strelitzia reginae) and birds nest ferns (Asplenium australasicum) are in the gardens constructed immediately adjacent to the buildings in the 1980s. These gardens were designed to be compatible with the earlier "rainforest" character of the gardens but have become increasingly shady in the 25years since their planting. The planting of begonias and other shade loving perennials around the entrance to the building is compatible with both the heritage character and growing conditions. The general refurbishment of the gardens by a skilled horticulturist has resulted in a garden of a very good quality.

=== Condition ===
As at 29 January 2009, the condition of the garden was at tisk of losing its horticultural and aesthetic significance by becoming overgrown with trees regarded by Council as noxious weeds, specifically Cocos Island palms (Syragus romanzoffianum) and camphor laurel trees. The trees are too crowded, compete with one another, some are now quite distorted in their search for sunlight rendering them unsafe to people and property and risking health and welfare. The canopy is so dense in some areas that there is insufficient light for quality ground specimens to grow. Overshadowing is affecting the health and welfare of residents...Many of the older trees have now reached or are approaching (the end of) their natural life span.

The horticulturist responsible for the gardens at Vaucluse House inspected Overthorpe in 2004 and observed that the garden was overrun with what he described as non-heritage relevant plantings such as large expanses of cast-iron plant, variegated wandering Jew (Tradescantia fluminensis) and introduced species such as Kaffir lilies (Clivia miniata) and peace lilies (Spathiphyllum sp.) These persist as they are the only types of plants that will grow in areas of restricted daylight and diminished environments. Cocos Island palms have proliferated and displaced Bangalow palms as the dominant species.

Most of the significant specimens in the garden are in reasonably good order considering how over-crowded the garden is, and how dry it was for much of the last few years. Since 2006 roots of camphor laurel trees near the south-eastern end of the property have created a severe trip hazard by pulling apart a pebble-Crete drive/path way. Roots from these trees are impacting the integrity of an historic sandstone wall in several places. This is reparable at the moment but may not be the case in future.

A large Moreton Bay fig overhangs the car parking area of Bibaringa, 349 New South Head Road to the south-east. A large camphor laurel here also overhangs the only vehicular access to Bibaringa. Branches from both regularly fall. A large Port Jackson fig (Ficus rubiginosa) over 130 years old on the southern border of the property, overhangs "Arlington", 351 New South Head Road. Council permission has been granted in the past to cut back, reduce the height and bulk of this tree.

The sandstone boundary wall to New South Head Road and the wall of the service drive have archaeological research potential. Heritage experts have identified markings on the sandstone of the front wall that show it could be traced to early residential developments in and around Sydney Cove. The wall to the right (east) of the main entrance (historically a milk-carter's track linking several properties) was inspected and found to carry unique convict markings as found in the earliest of Sydney's historic properties.

=== Modifications and dates ===
- A site survey was undertaken pre-demolition of the house in 1980.
- June 1980 Overthorpe's brick house and rear sheds were demolished.
- c. 1980 (time of apartment development): all camphor laurel trees bordering New South Head Road were cut to the ground so as not to compromise the streetscape provided by the Canary Island date palms. Understorey plantings in the garden were mainly exotic species such as hydrangeas, Daphne, Gardenia and holly (Ilex sp.) Some still persist, although in much smaller numbers and some have disappeared.
- c. 1980 on completion of the apartments, 3 Canary Island date palms were planted to make up gaps in the row of these trees facing New South Head Road.
- July 1981 Woollahra Municipal Council granted conditional consent to construct a residential flat building with 33 units (25/8/82 letter on file).
- 13 July 1981 following plants reported stolen (using photographs) from garden (reported to Rose Bay Police Stn.): three Black bean trees; 9 Cocos Island palms; 13 Bangalow palms; 1 date palm; 1 Mediterranean fan palm (Chamaerops humilis); 1 Rhapis palm (R.excelsa) (File note).
- 1981 Federation mansion demolished and replaced by two Mirvac apartment buildings.
- From 2008 a large pine tree was removed from the back (north-east) corner of Overthorpe adjoining "St.Neots" 335 New South Head Road) which was infested with termites affecting the timber framework of a garden trellis and various wooden posts in the garden. A camphor laurel tree overhanging St.Neot's terraces was trimmed and subsequently died and was removed (in this same area).
- 2002: large (over 100' tall) mature evergreen/Southern magnolia / bull bay (Magnolia grandiflora) tree in eastern garden fell over. Half its canopy was removed, a rolled steel joint and concrete slab attempted to right the tree but only extended its life by a few years. Later the whole tree was removed. Landarc (1991) ranked this as a magnificent specimen.
- August 2004: large lily pilly (over 80' tall) fell over in a car parking area in high winds and was removed.
- Date not clear: large brown pine (Podocarpus elatus) on eastern boundary with block of flats was drastically pruned without approval. It appears to be directly related to the sale of one of these units. Most of the canopy of this tree has been removed.
- 2004: 120 lily pillies were underplanted under the Canary Island date palms along New South Head Road in anticipation of removal of the camphor laurel trees here. 150 golden cane palms (advanced specimens) were planted behind the lily pillies (to bolster the rainforest character of the garden).
- December 2005 large camphor laurel tree fell over New South Head Road on Christmas Eve and was removed by the SES.
- Spring 2008: over 12 significant branches ranging in weight from 5–25 kg fell from fig, silver quandong and camphor laurel trees into the garden.
- 2005-8: horticulturist employed has made considerable improvement to ground level plants, shrubs and ferns.

=== Further information ===
- Emphasise the historic character of the garden through the conservation of significant trees and garden elements and replacement using the same species or materials or a species of similar character.

- Historically there was a thick band of planting on the boundaries of the property and a more open character in the centre around first, the mansion and later, the apartment blocks. Today this character is somewhat reversed with more views into the site and a clustering of vegetation and overshadowing immediately adjacent to the buildings.
- Theapproach is to recapture this original style with less planting and therefore more light in the centre of the gardens and thicker more dense plantings around the penmeter
- The recommended actions within this report will require staging over a number of years.

== Heritage listing ==
As of 4 November 2010, the gardens of Overthorpe were part of a large and significant botanical collection of rare and exotic Australian rainforest species. The collection of mature trees with their massive canopies has created a micro-environment indistinguishable from a natural sub-tropical rain forest, and an environment unmatched in the Municipality of Woollahra. In spite of the relatively small size of the site, it contains a historic collection of rain forest trees and palms of regional significance and importance, second only to the collection in the Sydney Royal Botanic Gardens.

The site was Sir John Hay's "garden" an unusual listing in the 1880s Sands Directory at the time he resided at Rose Bay Lodge Rose Bay. This garden contained a gardener's cottage and is believed to have been the site of an Experimental Nursery. The selection of mature species suggests a possible link with William Guilfoyle's work. The magnificent specimens of great age and scale are testament to the 19th century passion for collecting and displaying rare and exotic trees.

This "rain forest" supports a fine and large collection of palms, easily eclipsing the significant palm grove in Vaucluse House gardens and creating in places a dominant "palm jungle" quality similar to the naturally occurring concentrations of Bangalow palms along the east coast of New South Wales. Much of the "palm jungle" remains totally concealed to public view contained within the tree canopy. Although some trees may have been removed with the unit development on the site all those remaining have benefitted from the installation of irrigation and the high level of maintenance of these gardens.

Located below the ridgeline and Edgecliff Road, the site's elevated position visually presents a lush-vegetated hill slope dominated by massive rainforest canopies and emergent araucarias. This very sheltered location with deep sandy soils and a north easterly aspect has one of the finest and most equitable micro-climates in the Municipality allowing maximum development of sub-tropical and even tropical species. The original vegetation would have more likely also included a local rainforest component and a number of these remnant species are still present.

From New South head Road, Double Bay, near the intersection with Manning Road, the dominant canopy is from an exceptional holm oak (Quercus ilex) and one massive and rare fig, possibly the small-leaved fig (Ficus obliqua). This fig, typical of the lush Australian rain forest plantings on this site, is botanically of great significance in being one of only a few specimens of this species in the Municipality. All but one of these occurs on this site. Another feature grouping of two closely planted specimens in the front garden display magnificent buttressing and a mass of coalesced aerial roots. Although F.obliqua occurs naturally as far south as the Shoalhaven area, it is unlikely that any of these trees are indigenous remnants. In addition to these figs, two Moreton Bay figs, one in particular of magnificent proportions, totally dominate the south-eastern corner of the property. In spite of their size and historical significance the trees are hemmed in on all sides by unit development making them less visually significant.

Apart from the generally larger figs and the dominant palm groves, the property contains many individual component and mature specimens of great botanical significance, including a large chir pine (Pinus roxburghii) and bull bay/evergreen magnolia (M.grandiflora). It is this general massing of many rare species to form a rain forest environment which makes this site very special. Large trees such as the sub-tropical and locally rare coolamon or watermelon tree (Syzygium moorei) in the western garden and silver quandong (Elaeocarpus kirtonii) in the eastern garden are both superb specimens, originally from the rain forests of north-eastern NSW and south-eastern Queensland. More commonly cultivated rainforest species such as bunya pine (Araucaria bidwillii), Illawarra flame tree (Brachychiton acerifolium) and black bean (Castanospermum australe) are all present in these gardens. The red cedar (Toona ciliata) formerly identified as significant on the site is no longer prominent.

Overthorpe was listed on the New South Wales State Heritage Register on 2 April 1999.
