= Dunara =

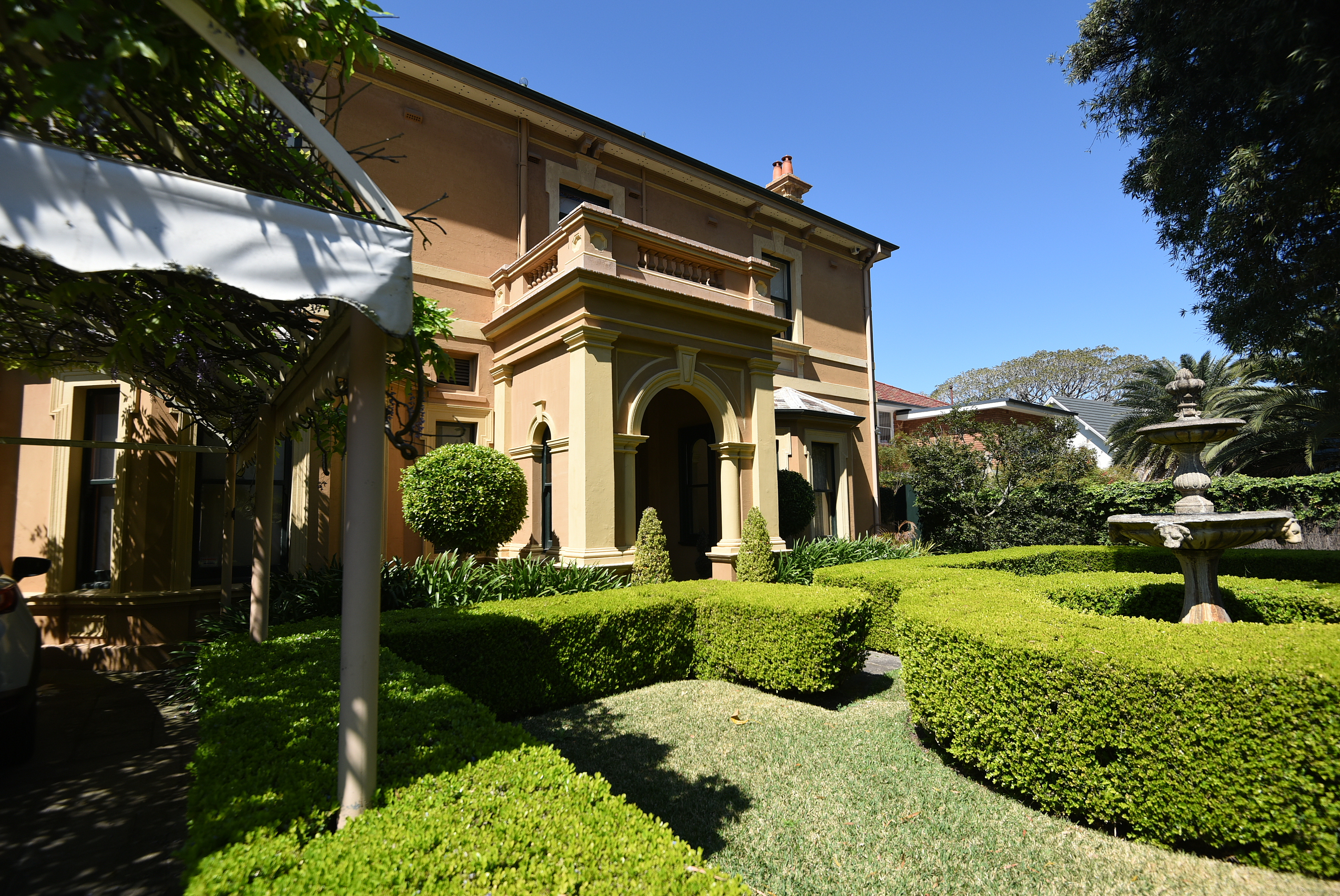
- Dunara, pictured in September 2017

- Location within Sydney Location within Australia
- 33°52′08″S 151°15′08″E
- Location: 10 Dunara Gardens, Point Piper, Sydney, Australia

History
- Built: 1882–1883
- Built for: Charles Mackellar

Site notes
- Architect: Professor Leslie Wilkinson (1957)

New South Wales Heritage Register
- Official name: Dunara; Dorothea Mackellar birthplace
- Type: State heritage (built)
- Designated: 2 April 1999
- Reference no.: 539
- Type: House
- Category: Residential buildings (private)

Dunara is a heritage-listed residence at Point Piper, in Sydney, Australia. It was built from 1882 to 1883. It is also known as the Dorothea Mackellar birthplace. The property is privately owned. It was added to the New South Wales State Heritage Register on 2 April 1999.

== History ==
=== Point Piper ===
The Point's European history began as part of a 76-hectare (190-acre) land grant by Governor Macquarie to Captain John Piper in 1820. Piper had control of customs and all harbour matters, a lucrative position which enabled him to vastly increase the size of his land holding and build the finest house then in Sydney on the Point. He named it Henrietta Villa (after the second name of Governor Macquarie's wife, Elizabeth) and it quickly became the most prestigious social venue in town. However, Piper's flamboyant and extravagant lifestyle exceeded even his resources and he was soon deeply in debt. In 1827 it became apparent that he had embezzled A£13,000 from the customs revenues which, together with other debts, amounted to millions in modern values. The mortified Piper made a curiously grand suicide attempt, having himself rowed out into the harbour and, to the strains of his naval band, jumping overboard. He survived to retire to a more modest rural life.

Henrietta Villa was bought by one of his debtors, Daniel Cooper in 1827, the Vaucluse part of his estate outside the Point being bought by William Wentworth and the rest (Bellevue Hill, Rose Bay, Woollahra) to the firm of Cooper and Levey to whom Piper had owed another A£20,000.

Daniel Cooper (1785–1853) had been transported to Australia in 1816 and became one of the colony's most successful merchants. His nephew, born in Lancashire in 1821 and also named Daniel Cooper, came to Australia in 1843 and was soon following in his Uncle's footsteps. Daniel the younger was already wealthy by the time he inherited his uncle's estate a decade later. He now had estates throughout the colony, including a large chunk around Double Bay, much of which was Piper's former estate. In 1856 Cooper began a great mansion called Woollahra House on Point Piper, on the site of Captain Piper's Henrietta Villa. In the same year Cooper became first Speaker of the New South Wales Legislative Assembly. He resigned from the Speakership in 1860 and returned to England a year later, became the Agent-General for NSW, was made the First Baronet of Woollahra in 1863, and died in 1902. Woollahra House was not completed until 1883 by his son, William. Some subdivisions of the Point also began around that time. It was suggested as a replacement for Government House around 1901 (then occupied by the Governor-General of Australia) but the offer was not taken up by the government and the estate was progressively sold off and the house demolished in 1929.

=== Point Piper Estate ===
In the 1820s business partners Daniel Cooper and Solomon Levey began acquiring land that included the substantial Point Piper Estate comprising 460 hectares (1,130 acres) in the Woollahra district that had been amassed by Captain John Piper since 1816. Following some financial difficulties Piper's land was conveyed to Cooper and Levey in 1826. Their title to the land was confirmed in 1830 and it became the sole property of Daniel Cooper in 1847. On Cooper's death in 1853, his nephew, also Daniel Cooper (later Sir Daniel Cooper), was appointed trustee of the Point Piper Estate which his uncle had bequeathed to his nephew's eldest son (also Daniel Cooper).

=== Point Piper Grant ===
Now a prestige living area, it was part of a 77-hectare (190-acre) grant to Captain John Piper in 1820 who was "Naval Officer" of the Colony at the time. After Piper found himself in financial difficulties the grant was bought in 1827 by Daniel Cooper who bequeathed it to the son of his nephew both also called Daniel. The son sold the grant to his brother, William, for A£100,000 who in 1883 built Woollahra House. The first subdivision on the Point took place around 1880 with the release of foreshore land around Woollahra House in 1899.

=== The Mackellars ===
John Mackellar married Euphemia Jackson and emigrated with their family to Australia from Dundee, Scotland in 1839. Their three sons were Keith, a sea trader, Frederick, who in 1839 became the first salaried officer at the Sydney Infirmary and Dispensary, later Sydney Hospital, and Charles, who became a surgeon. Frederick had a son, Charles Kinnaird Mackellar (1844–1926) who married Marion Isobel Buckland (1854–1933) in 1877. There were four children of this marriage: Keith; Eric; Isobel Marion Dorothea (1885–1968) and Malcolm. Keith was killed in action in South Africa on 11 July 1890, during the Boer War. He was second lieutenant in the Australian Volunteer Horse Squadron.

Charles Mackellar (1844–1926) was born in Sydney and educated at Sydney Grammar School and the University of Glasgow Medical School, graduating in 1871. He returned to Australia and practised in Sydney, becoming a noted physician and sociologist. Charles registered with the Medical Board of NSW in 1872. In 1873-77 he was honorary surgeon at the Sydney Infirmary and Dispensary, where his father had been the first salaried officer. He advised the NSW Government on hygiene and preventative medicine and helped establish the North Head Quarantine Station and the Coast, or Prince Henry Hospital. In 1883, he became president of the new Board of Health and president of the NSW branch of the British Medical Association, which was set up in 1880. Mackellar was a physician at the hospital in 1882 and a director from 1884 to 1903. He was also a director of Royal Prince Alfred Hospital from 1886 to 1917. He worked "stupendously" at general practice in his early years. In 1877 he married Marion Buckland, acquired considerable pastoral interests and in 1896 succeeded his father-in-law as a director of the Bank of NSW, of which he was president in 1901-23 apart from absences abroad in 1904-5 and 1912–13. He was chairman, board member and trustee of a number of other companies, in insurance, sugar refining, etc.

His parliamentary career included serving in the NSW Legislative Council from 1885. He became a Senator in 1903 but his commitments precluded attendance at Melbourne sittings so he resumed his Legislative Council seat. He was president of the Children's Relief Department from 1903 and published a pamphlet on "Parental Rights and Parental Responsibility" (1903) and a treatise on "The Child, The Law and the State" (1907); he established homes for invalid children at Mittagong, for disabled children at Parramatta and for delinquents who had been before the Children's Court, at Ormond House. In 1913, Mackellar reported on the treatment of delinquent and neglected children in Europe and the United States. Mackellar was knighted in 1912, and appointed KCMG in 1916; he died in Sydney on 14 July 1926.

Marion Isobel Mackellar (née Buckland) (1854–1933) was the second daughter of Thomas Buckland of Kent, a wealthy merchant, pastoralist and banker. Buckland became a director and president of the Bank of New South Wales, a position in which he was succeeded by his son-in-law, Charles, from 1901 to 1923. Marion married Charles Mackellar in August 1877 at St. Paul's Church, Sydney. They had three sons and a daughter, Dorothea.

==== Dunara ====
Dunara was built c. 1882 – c. 1883 by distinguished physician, MLA and philanthropist, Sir Charles McKellar. The house was the birthplace and the childhood home of his daughter, Dorothea, the famous poet. It is a good example of the spacious and well-crafted residence of the period. Dorothea Mackellar was born on 1 July 1885 at the family home, Dunara, built by the Mackellars on zero point eight one to two point zero two hectares (two to five acres) at Rose Bay/Point Piper. The two-storied residence was surrounded by servants' quarters, a stable, a coach house, numerous outbuildings and magnificent gardens. Dunara is an indigenous word for "gunyah on the slope of a hill", and was one of many residences in Sydney owned by the Mackellar family. Dorothea Mackellar spent most of her childhood here.

==== Dorothea Mackellar ====
Dorothea was educated privately, travelled extensively and was educated at the University of Sydney. She became fluent in French, Spanish, German and Italian and attended some lectures at the University of Sydney. Her youth was protected and highly civilised. She moved easily amongst the society of Sydney's intellectual and administrative elite, life on her family's country properties and among their friends in London. While staying at Torryburn, a family property in the Allyn River valley in the Hunter Valley, she experienced the breaking of a drought and subsequently wrote the patriotic verse My Country. This poem was published under the title "Core of My Heart" in The Spectator on 5 September 1908, when she was visiting London, and reprinted in The Sydney Mail on 21 October 1908 and in most of Australia's leading newspapers and journals, on occasions with minor wording changes. It quickly became Australia's best-known lyric poem. The poem captured the spirit of nationalism developing in the early 20th century. In 1911 her first book of verse, "The closed door and other verses" was published in Melbourne. The appearance of My Country in this book is thought to be the first under its more familiar title.

Dorothea travelled widely in Europe, Asia and South America and published three more collections of verse: "The Witch Maid" (1914); "Dreamharbour" (1923); and "Fancy Dress" (1927). Her novel, 'Outlaw's Luck' (1922) reflected impressions of Argentina and her poems included translations from Spanish, German and Japanese. She also wrote two other novels in collaboration with Ruth Bedford, but ill health had virtually ended her literary career when "Fancy Dress" appeared. Dorothea was appointed OBE in the 1968 New Year Honours list and died at the Scottish Hospital, Sydney on 14 January 1968. Prior to this she had spent a good deal of time living in relative seclusion at her house, Tarrangaua, in Lovett Bay, Pittwater. "The Poems of Dorothea Mackellar", including "My Country" and a brief memoir by Adrienne Matzenik (née Howley) was published in 1971. On her 82nd birthday in 1967, Dorothea told two friends, Gordon Williamson and Dorothea Macmillan, that the famous poem was completed in the apartments above her father's consulting rooms in Buckland Chambers, overlooking Hyde Park (183 Liverpool Street), Sydney.

An 1887 photograph shows the bushland surrounding Dunara (downhill to its east, south and to the north) the house is on a cleared rise above Rose Bay). In 1919 the house was sold to merino sheep breeder, Sir Norman Kater (1919) and in 1931 sold to Mr Michaelis. Some alterations were carried out by architect G. Keesing in 1933 and when bought by Mr Plowman in 1957 further modifications of a sympathetic nature were made by Professor Leslie Wilkinson. It was later acquired by the Royal Australian Air Force and has been used as a WAAF Officer's Mess. The property was subdivided in 1954, alienating most of the grounds. Although bushland no longer leads to the foreshores (to the east side of Pt. Piper), Dunara still has an uninterrupted view of Rose Bay. The whole cul-de-sac of Dunara Gardens (now 11 houses) was all part of Dunara's original estate, which stretched east to Wunulla Road, much of it grassed with a circular driveway west of the front door. In 1978 Dunara was up for sale. Russell (1980) noted it was sold by auction in 1979.

The poem, In a Southern Garden, by Dorothea Mackellar is believed to relate to her early home, Dunara:

"And a chorus rises valiantly from
where the crickets hide,
Close-shaded by the balsams
drooping down -
It is evening in a garden by the
kindly waterside,
A garden near the lights of
Sydney town!"

Dorothea Mackellar spent many of her early years at Dunara, a Georgian mansion built by her father on a large property fronting Rose Bay. In 1978, long after the once-expansive grounds were subdivided c. 1950, Dunara is to be sold. In Point Piper Past & Present Nesla Griffiths writes: "Miss Dorothea Mackellar tells me that Dunara is a native word meaning "the house on the hill" and that her father built his home between 1882 and 1884. It is still standing, and is one of the few with a drive to the door, with a lovely view eastward, and in those days gracious gardens and beautiful trees."

Dunara was bought by Dr. N. W. Kater (later Sir Norman) in 1919 and sold to Mr Michaelis in 1931. It was one of the houses taken over by the RAAF and has been used as a WAAF Officers' mess. The house has two storeys, covering about 45 squares, a colonial verandah on the ground floor and a balcony on the first floor, both with wrought iron lacework. Bushland no longer leads to the foreshores but Dunara still has an uninterrupted view of Rose Bay.

The sandstock walls of the house are 45 centimetres (18 in) thick and the front door is cedar with etched white glass panels. The Minton tiled vestibule inside the front porch leads to the sitting room, drawing room, dining room and cedar staircase to the second floor. There are five bedrooms, some of which contain period features like bay windows and the original chain window sashes. All have marble fireplaces (there are seven in the house) cedar and mahogany joinery, and 4.6 metre high ceilings. The main bedroom is huge, and it has two floor-to-ceiling windows leading to the balcony, a wall of built-in cupboards and a study annexe. The present owners, who have been progressively restoring the mansion since they moved in 21 years ago (1957), plan to move to a smaller home. Richardson & Wrench, of Double Bay, will auction the property on 24 November 1978. The house was sold by auction on 7 June 1979.

Mr Andre Korda, the present (1987) owner (at the time of PCO) was interested in the heritage aspect of the Dunara Gardens property and nominated it for the protective order.

== Background ==
=== Charles Mackellar ===
Sir Charles Kinnaird Mackellar (1844–1926) was a physician, politician and businessman. Only son of Frederick Mackellar (d.1863) physician, from Dundee, Scotland and wife Isabella, née Robertson, widow of William McGarvie. Educated at Sydney Grammar, Charles moved with his family to the Port Macquarie district c. 1860. He spent several years on the land before proceeding to Scotland to attend the University of Glasgow (MB, Ch.M., 1871). Returning to Sydney he registered with the Medical Board of NSW on 25 March 1872. In 1873-7 he was honorary surgeon at the Sydney Infirmary and Dispensary where his father had been first salaried medical officer: (Sir) Henry Normand MacLaurin also joined the staff in 1873 and cemented one of the most important friendships of Dr Mackellar's life. He was a physician at the hospital in 1882 and a director from 1884 to 1917. He worked "stupendously" at general practice in his early years.

In September 1881 Dr Mackellar joined the board, led by Dr Alfred Roberts, which was appointed to control the first serious smallpox epidemic in NSW and was gazetted as the Board of Health on 6/1/1882. In July Mackellar became Government Medical Adviser, health officer for Port Jackson, chairman of the Immigration Board, and an official visitor to the hospitals for the insane at Gladesville and Parramatta. He was also ex officio emigration officer for Port Jackson, and a member of the Board of Pharmacy and the Medical Board. In July 1883 he campaigned for a federal quarantine system and was appointed president of the Board of Health in August. Contemporaries believed that Mackellar was solely responsible for the organisation of the department but he deferred to Roberts: "it is rather that I doggedly and persistently followed his lines than that I formulated any original scheme of my own" - the Mackellar motto was Perseverando.

Persuaded by the attorney-general W. B. Dalley, a private patient, Mackellar resigned his official appointments in August 1885 and was nominated to the Legislative Council to promote public health legislation he had helped to draft, but which lapsed with the resignation of the Stuart government in October. He was an ordinary member of the Board of Health until 1925. In 1886–7 as vice-president of the Executive Council and briefly secretary for Mines Mackellar represented the Jennings government in the Representative Council. He introduced the Dairies Supervision Act of 1886 which helped to reduce infant mortality. Except for October–November 1903, when he was appointed to the Australian Senate, he remained in the council until 1925. In 1903-4 he chaired the Royal Commission on the decline in the birth rate, dominating its proceedings in a manner uncharacteristic of his usually careful approach to scientific enquiry.

In 1882-5 Mackellar had been a member of the State Children Relief Board. In 1902-14 he was president, and was identified with the Neglected Children and Juvenile Offenders Act (1905) which created children's courts and the probationary system. He was soon at loggerheads with his under-secretary Peter Board, largely over the extension of the Board's activities into areas not envisaged by its Act. Criticism, muted while Mackellar remained in office, became public not long after his departure. Until at least 1912, Mackellar had been convinced that environmental factors determined the development of the young. Enquiries abroad leading to his report as Royal Commissioner on the Treatment of Neglected and Delinquent Children in Great Britain, Europe and America (1913) caused him to modify his views. With Professor D.A.Welsh he published an essay, Mental Deficiency (1917) advocating better training and care of the feeble minded, and suggesting their sterilisation on eugenic grounds. Mackellar consistently lectured and published pamphlets to propagate social reform. He was admired for his reluctance to align himself with any political faction, and for his unselfish devotion to the public interest. Knighted in 1912, he was appointed KPMG in 1916.

On 9 August 1877 Mackellar had married Marion (d.1933) daughter of Thomas Buckland. He acquired considerable pastoral interests and in 1896 succeeded his father-in-law as a director of the Bank of NSW, of which he was president in 1901-23 apart from absences abroad in 1904-5 and 1912–13. Mackellar was chairman of the Gloucester Estate Co. in its later years and succeeded MacLaurin as chairman of the Mutual Life & Citizens' Assurance Co. Ltd; he had been a trustee from 1911 to 1914. He was also a director of Pitt, Son & Badgery Ltd.; the Union Trustee Co. of Australia Ltd.; United Insurance Co. Ltd.; Colonial Sugar Refining Co.; Australian Widows' Fund; and Equitable Life Assurance Co.Ltd. of which he was medical director. He was surgeon in the Volunteer Rifles from 1872; chairman of the medical section of the Royal Society of NSW in 1881; founding councillor and in 1883-4 president of the NSW branch of the British Medical Association; examiner in medicine at the University of Sydney in 1889–1901; vice-president and in 1907-14 president of the Sydney Amateur Orchestral Society; inaugural vice-president of the Royal Society for the Welfare of Mothers and Babies in 1918; and a member of the Australian and Athenaeum Clubs, Sydney.

By 1923 Mackellar had resigned most of his business appointments as health and memory deserted him. He died at his residence Rosemont, Woollahra on 14 July 1926 and was buried in the Anglican section of the Waverley Cemetery. His estate, valued for probate at A£39,205, was left in trust to his wife and on her death in 1933 to their surviving children Eric, Malcolm and Dorothea. His eldest son Keith Kinnaird had been killed in action in South Africa in 1900. One of Dr Mackellar's special interests was public health and he did pioneering work with juvenile delinquents and mentally defective children; he was knighted for his services to medicine. Later he became a Member of the Legislative Council of NSW, and in 1903 was elected a Senator for NSW.

=== Dorothea Mackellar ===
Isobel Marion Dorothea Mackellar (1885–1968) was born at Dunara, Point Piper, Sydney, the third child (of four children and the only girl in the family) of native-born parents (Sir) Charles Kinnaird Mackellar and his wife Marion, daughter of Thomas Buckland. She was educated at home and travelled extensively with her parents, becoming fluent in French, Spanish, German and Italian, and also attended some lectures at the University of Sydney. Her youth was protected and highly civilised. She moved easily between the society of Sydney's intellectual and administrative elite, life on her family's country properties, and among their friends in London.

Dorothea began writing while quite young and surprised her family when magazines not only published but paid for her verses and prose pieces. On 5 September 1908 a poem, "Core of my heart", which she had written about 1904, appeared in the London "Spectator". It reappeared several times in Australia before being included as "My Country" in her first book, "The closed door, and other verses". She published "The Witchmaid, and other verses" in 1914 and two more volumes of verse (1923 & 1926), also a novel "Outlaw's luck" set in Argentina. With Ruth Bedford, a childhood friend, she wrote two other novels (1912, 1914). During World War 1 and as a result of its frequent inclusion in anthologies, "My Country" became one of the best-known Australian poems, appealing to the sense of patriotism fostered by the war and post-war nationalism.

Photographs of Dorothea in her twenties show her to have been then an ideal image of the Australian girl, pretty, sensitive, and fashionable. She was said to be a strong swimmer, and a keen judge of horses and dogs. Her verse shows that she was cultivated and spirited, and her novels that she was hopelessly romantic. Between 1911 and 1914 she was twice engaged. The first engagement she broke because the man was over-protective; the second lapsed through misunderstanding and lack of communication after the outbreak of war. Her writing, once the product of youthful passion and enthusiasm, became increasingly souvenirs of travel or dependent on nature for inspiration. She was unable to write of her disappointment in love except in powerful translations from little-known Spanish and German poets.

Despite her "loathing all restrictions and meetings" Dorothea Mackellar was honorary treasurer of the Bush Book Club of NSW and active in the formation in 1931 of the Sydney P.E.N Club. She became responsible for her ageing parents, and apparently wrote little after her father's death in 1926. Her mother died in 1933 and Dorothea, "a not particularly robust dormouse", was frequently in poor health, spending ten years in a Randwick nursing home. Yet she outlived her younger brothers and was able to keep both Cintra, Darling Point, and a house at Church Point on Pittwater. She was appointed O.B.E just before she died on 14 January 1968 in the Scottish Hospital, Paddington, after a fall at home. She was cremated after a service at St Mark's Church, Darling Point and her ashes laid in the family vault in Waverley Cemetery. Her estate was valued for probate at over $1,580,000.

H. M. Green describes her as a "lyrist of colour and light" in love with the Australian landscape. She herself 'never professed to be a poet. I have written - from the heart, from imagination, from experience "some amount of verse". Privileged and unusual, she was also typical of many Australian women of her generation in the contrast between the inspired vigour of her youth and the atrophy of her talent and vitality through lack of use. Russell added that she became friendly with Joseph Conrad and his wife in London, where she lived for some years before World War I. He adds she lived for some time at Rosemont, Woollahra and from the 1930s at Cintra, Darling Point Road, Darling Point.

== Description ==
=== Site and garden ===
Dunara retains a portion of front (street-facing) formal garden, to Dunara Gardens and a small more informal rear garden, facing east towards Rose Bay. This garden is a remnant of the former Dunara estate which was subdivided in the 1950s, creating Dunara Gardens and adjoining house lots and Dunara Reserve to the house's south-west, facing Dunara Gardens.

The house no longer had its original bush leading to the harbour foreshores, but it retains an uninterrupted view of Rose Bay (to its east).

=== House ===
Victorian house built c. 1882 – c. 1883. It is a two-storey stuccoed sandstock brick house with slate roof and fine cast iron and tiled verandah and balcony. The brick walls are 45 cm thick. The stables have been partially demolished and the servants' wing likewise has been separated from the house and converted into another dwelling.

The entrance hall is particularly fine, having delicately carved shell motif etched cedar door head trims to doors opening off it and with Minton floor tiles. The house covers 45 squares (418 square metres).

The entrance hall leads to the sitting room, drawing room, dining room and the staircase to the first floor. All rooms are spacious and have provision for fireplaces, six of which have fine marble fireplace surrounds remaining. There are four bedrooms and one study. Two bathrooms have been added though it is understood that the original fabric remains intact underneath.

The upper floor is reached by an elaborately carved staircase via a large first floor hall lit by an etched glass skylight. Windows and French doors are timber framed and generally glazed with large sheets of hand-drawn plate glass. The ceilings have been strengthened early this century by an artistic application of patterned battened mouldings.

The front of Dunara has a recent brush-fence along it. In the southwestern corner of Dunara is a dead Sydney blue gum (Eucalyptus saligna). Another large tree, a Qld. black bean (Castanospermum australe) in Dunara's garden has also died and been removed. The whole cul-de-sac of Dunara Gardens (now 11 houses) was all part of Dunara's original estate, which stretched east to Wunulla Road, much of it grassed with a circular driveway.

=== Condition ===
As of 6 September 2017, the house was generally in very good condition.

=== Modifications and dates ===
The following modification has been made to the site:

- 1933 alterations by G. Keesing, architect
- c. 1939-45 acquired by RAAF and used as WAAF Officers' Mess.
- Latter half, 20th century: stables partially demolished and the servants' wing likewise has been separated from the house and converted into another dwelling. The verandah to the south was removed under the terms of the covenant although some iron work was salvaged
- 1954 subdivision alienating most of Dunara's grounds including circular driveway in lawn areas and bushland-clad access to Pt.Piper's eastern side foreshores. The subdivision resulted in the property now standarding on a 784 square metre landholding. 11 houses are now around it off Dunara Gardens cul-de-sac, which did not exist prior.
- 1957 modifications (sympathetic) by Prof. Leslie Wilkinson
- c. 1990 ensuite and dressing room for main bedroom installed in former hall access from second floor landing to rear (eastern) verandah. Bathroom installed to left hand side of front door (former room). Front and rear gardens re-landscaped with box (Buxus sp.) hedging, Gardenia sp. and grassed areas. Brick wall to southern side (right of way access to two lots downhill and east of Dunara).
- The front of Dunara has a recent brush-fence along it. In the southwestern corner of Dunara is a dead Sydney blue gum (Eucalyptus saligna). Another large tree, a Qld. black bean (Castanospermum australe) in Dunara's garden has also died and been removed.
- 2007: two air conditioning units and conduits were installed via southern wall of house & floor, without prior approval.

=== Further information ===
Generally in very good condition (1987)

== Heritage listing ==
As of 21 November 2006, Dunara was the oldest remaining house in Point Piper. It is historically significant particularly for its associations with Dorothea McKellar - as her birthplace and for its association with the influences on her artistic development, including her education, cultural environment and the surrounding landscape. Architecturally the house is an excellent example of a well-crafted Victorian residence of the period (built c 1883). It is a two-storey stuccoed brick house with a slate roof and fine cast iron verandah and balcony, retaining much of its original detail intact and which past and present owners have maintained in a sympathetic manner.

The stables have been partially demolished and the servants' wing likewise has been separated from the house and converted into another dwelling. The entrance hall is particularly fine, having delicately carved shell motif cedar door head trims to doors opening off it and with Minton tiles.

Dunara was listed on the New South Wales State Heritage Register on 2 April 1999.

== See also ==
- Australian residential architectural styles
