= Point Piper =

- Suburb
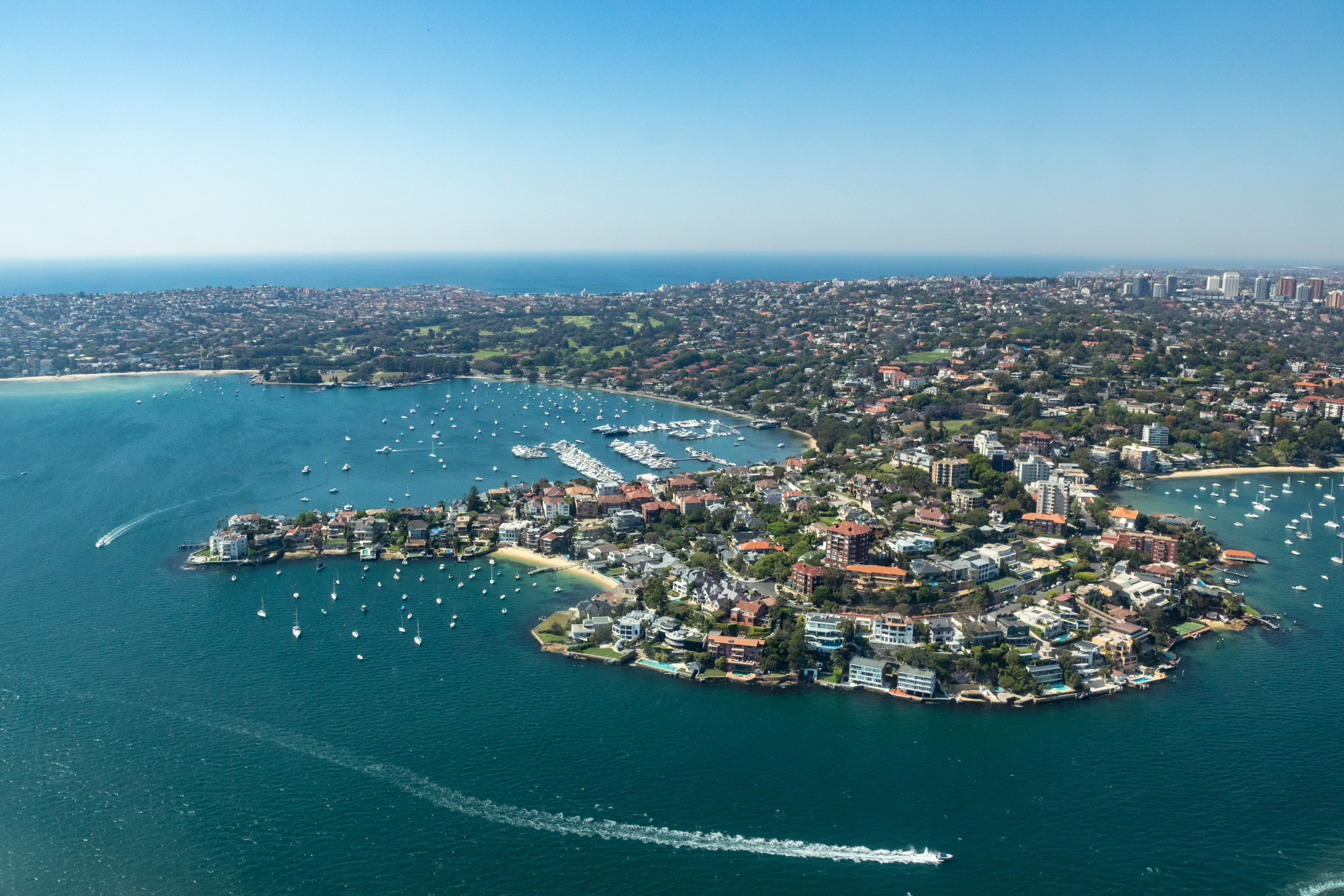
- Point Piper

- Interactive map of Point Piper
- Coordinates: 33°52′14″S 151°15′3″E
- Country: Australia
- State: New South Wales
- City: Sydney
- LGA: Municipality of Woollahra
- Location: 6 km (3.7 mi) east of Sydney CBD

Government
  - State electorate: Vaucluse
  - Federal division: Wentworth

Area
  - Total: 0.39 km^{2} (0.15 sq mi)
- Elevation: 23 m (75 ft)

Population
  - Total: 1,334 (SAL 2021)
- Postcode: 2027
Suburbs around Point Piper
	Port Jackson
Darling Point	Point Piper	Rose Bay
Double Bay	Bellevue Hill	Bellevue Hill

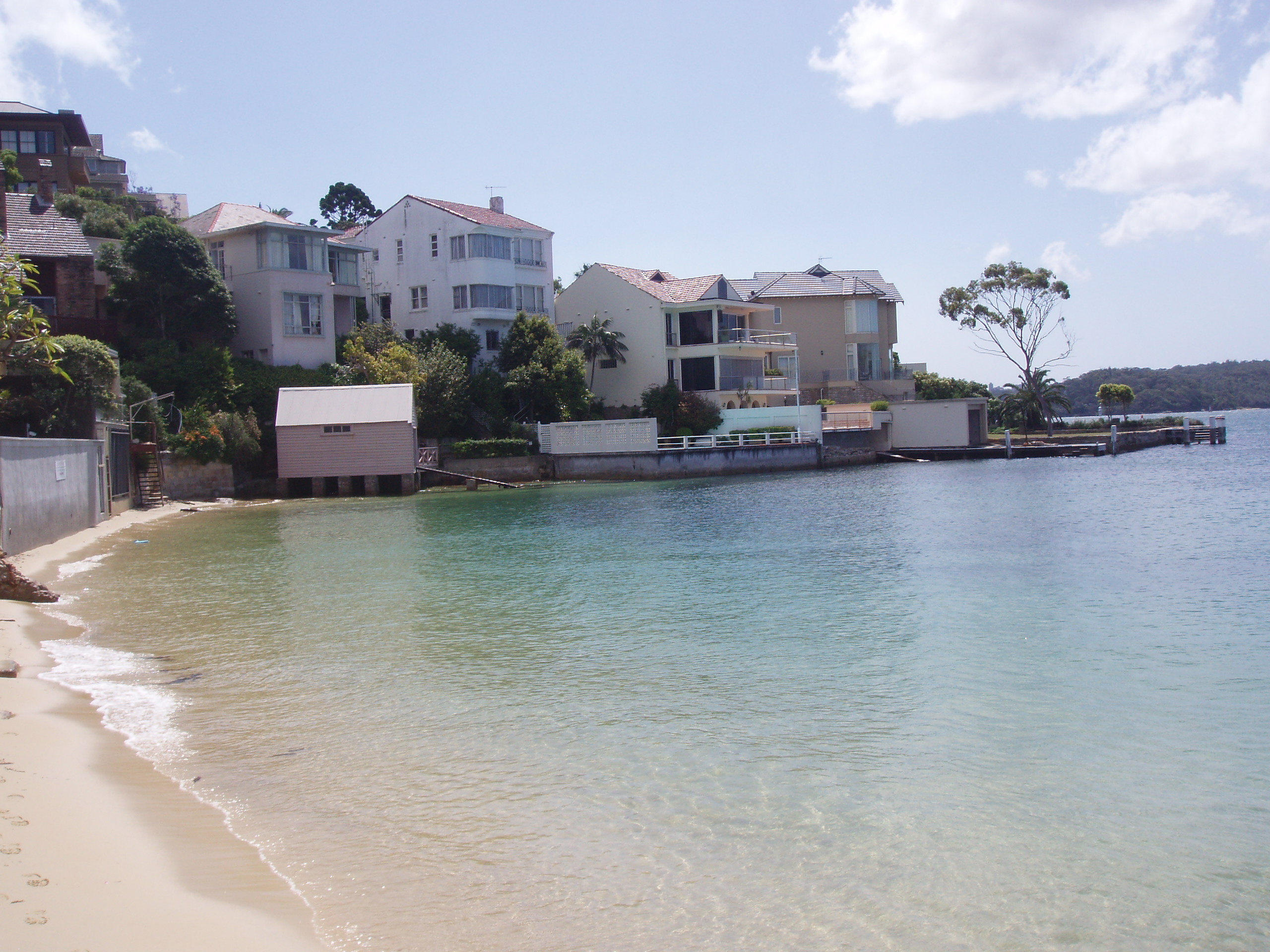
Lady Martin's Beach

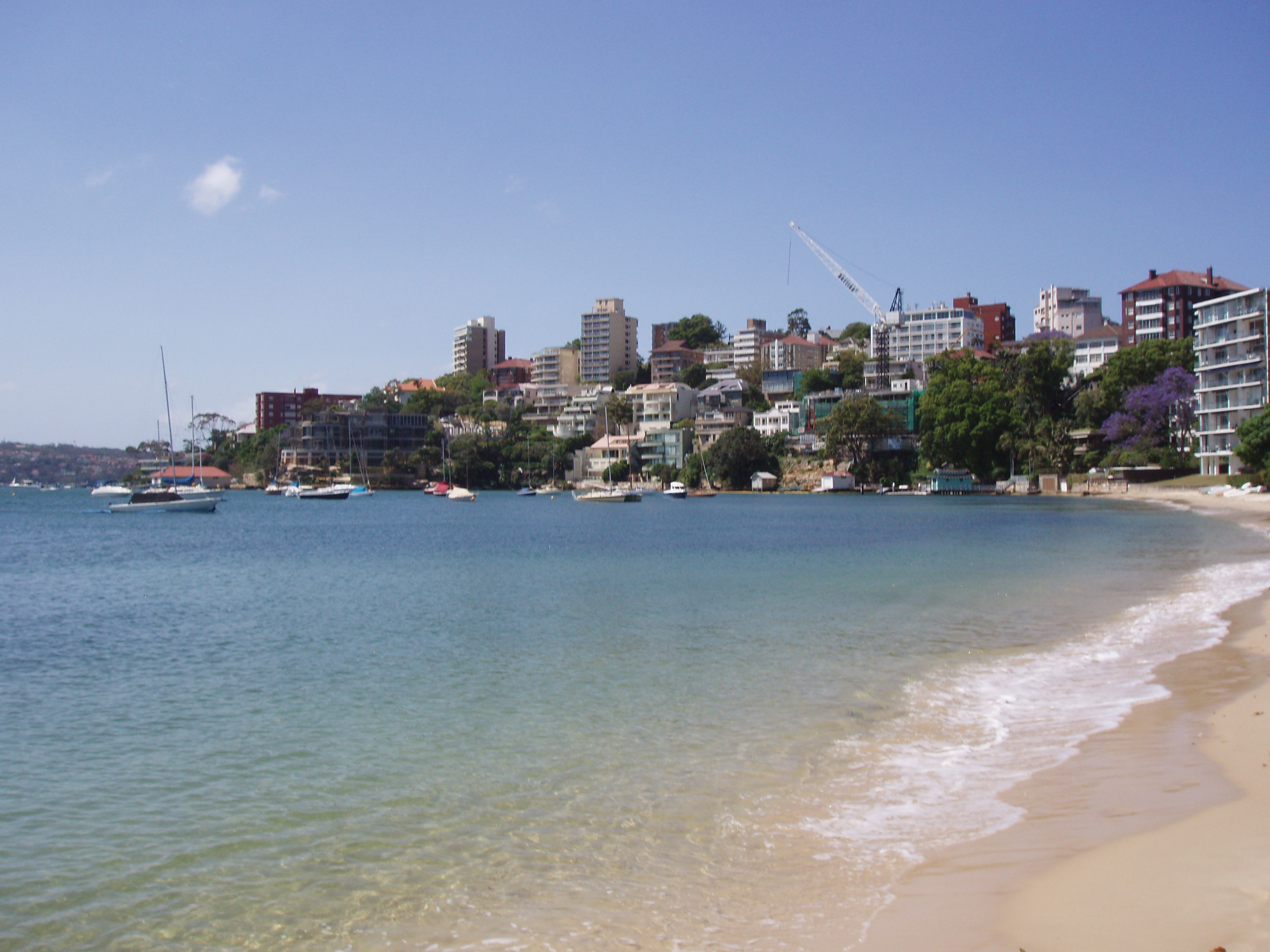
Seven Shillings Beach

Point Piper is a small, harbourside eastern suburb of Sydney, in the state of New South Wales, Australia, 6 kilometres (4 mi) east of the Sydney CBD, in the local government area known as the Municipality of Woollahra.

== Location ==
The suburb of Point Piper sits on Sydney Harbour, beside the suburbs of Rose Bay, Bellevue Hill and Double Bay. The eleven streets in Point Piper are: Buckhurst Avenue, Longworth Avenue, New South Head Road, Saint Mervyn's Avenue, Wolseley Road, Wolseley Crescent, Wingadal Place, Wentworth Place, Wentworth Street, Wunulla Road, and Wyuna Road.

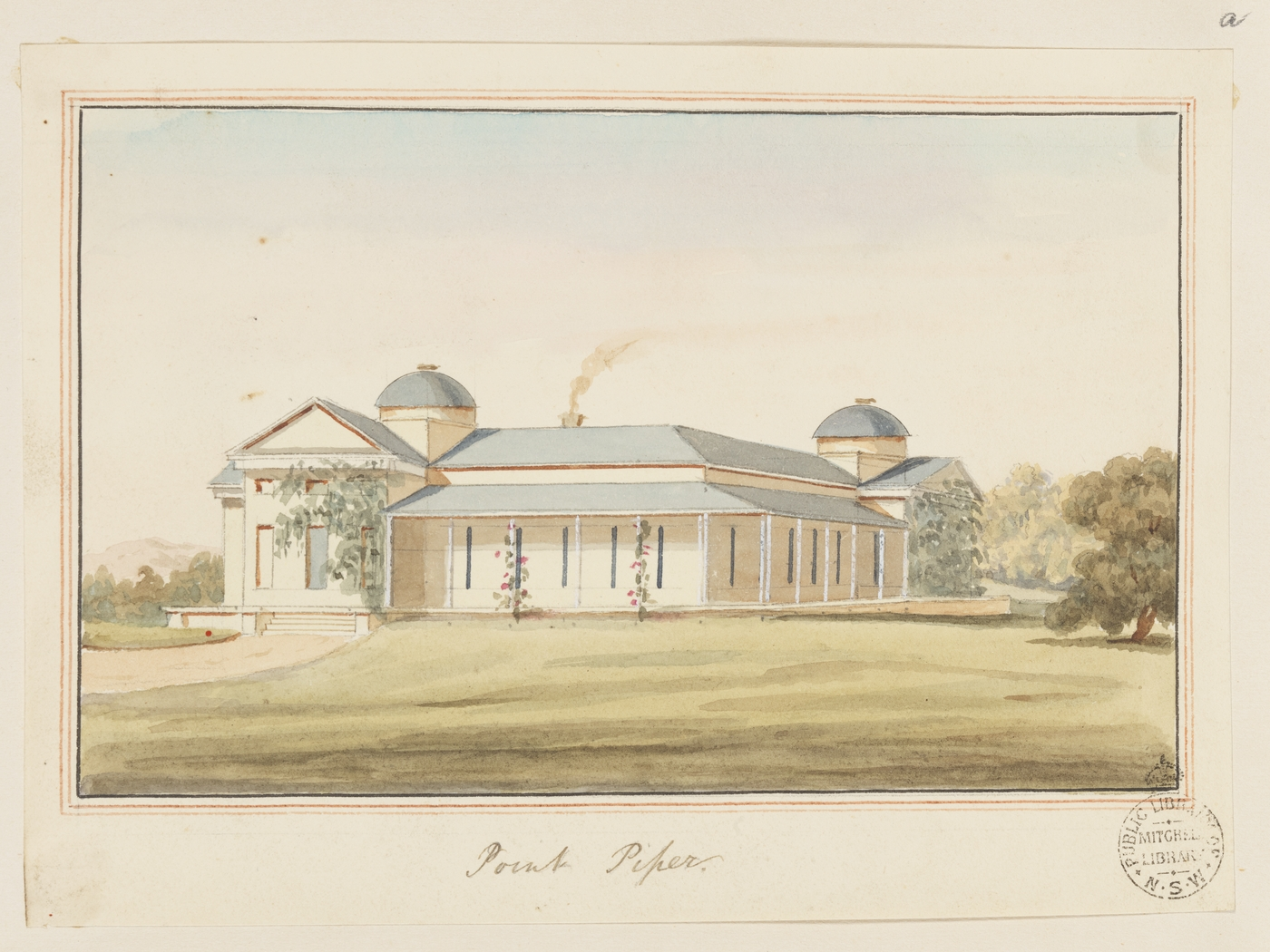
Point Piper House (also called Henrietta Villa) 1840s

== Heritage listings ==
Point Piper has a number of heritage-listed sites, including Dunara at 10 Dunara Gardens.

== Commercial area ==
Point Piper does not have a commercial area, and has few amenities or public facilities. The closest commercial areas are in nearby suburbs such as Rose Bay and Double Bay.

== Beaches and reserves ==
- Duff Reserve, off Wolseley Road, deep water point, popular for weddings and picnics
- Lady Martin's Beach, Wunulla Road
- Seven Shillings Beach, off New South Head Road
- Redleaf Pool, off New South Head Road, on Seven Shillings Beach

== Clubs ==
- The Scots College rowing shed, off Wolseley Road
- Royal Motor Yacht Club, 21 Wunulla Road
- Royal Prince Edward Yacht Club

== Population ==
At the 2011 census, 1,404 people were living in Point Piper. In the 2016 census, the population had risen to 1,424 people. 56.1% of people were born in Australia and 71.3% of people only spoke English at home. The most common responses for religion were No Religion 28.3%, Catholic 20.0%, Judaism 13.6% and Anglican 13.3%. At the 2021 census, there were 1,334 people in Point Piper.

=== Housing ===
Point Piper is home to some of the most expensive and exclusive homes in Australia, holding three of the five most expensive house sales nationwide ($130m, $100m, $95m). There are only eleven streets in Point Piper; the main road is Wolseley Road. The price per square metre of real estate in Point Piper is one of the most expensive in the world.

== Notable residents ==
- Jimmy Bancks (1889–1952), the creator of Ginger Meggs, lived at Deloraine until 1 July 1952, when he died from a heart attack the age of 63.
- Edgar Bainton (1880–1956), British-born composer and conductor.
- Sir Daniel Cooper, 1st Baronet, colonial merchant and politician, started construction of Woollahra House
- Chris Corrigan, Qube Holdings chairman
- Neville Crichton, car dealer
- John George Nathaniel Gibbes, a resident of Point Piper House
- Bruce Jackson (1949–2011), audio engineer, who lived in the mansion Altona in his youth
- Sir Frank Lowy AC, former Westfield Group founder and chairman
- Sir Charles Mackellar KCMG (1844–1926), an Australian politician and surgeon
- Dorothea Mackellar OBE (1885–1968), Australian poet best known for My Country, born at Dunara, in Point Piper
- Lady Martin, Isabella Martin, estranged wife of Sir James Martin, Premier of New South Wales lived in Woollahra House
- Sir William McMahon, Prime Minister of Australia and wife Lady McMahon
- Lachlan Murdoch, businessman and wife Sarah
- John Piper (1773–1851), a colonial military officer who received the first land grant in the area
- Sir Frank Renouf, New Zealand financier (deceased) and wife Susan Renouf
- Rene Rivkin, stockbroker (deceased)
- John Symond, founder of Aussie Home Loans
- Doctor Frank Tidswell and his wife Edith, lived at Deloraine, next to Duff Reserve
- Malcolm Turnbull, former Prime Minister and wife Lucy, businesswoman and former Lord Mayor of Sydney
- Mike Cannon-Brookes, billionaire co-founder of Atlassian
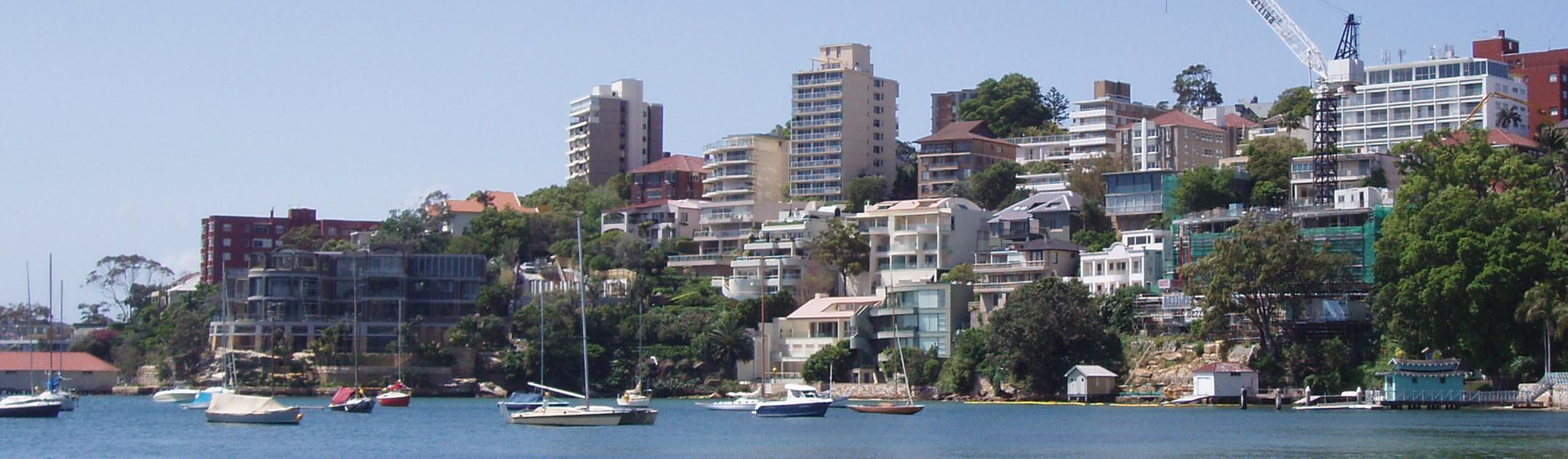
View of Point Piper from Sydney Harbour
