= Rosie Scott =

New Zealand writer

Rosie Scott AM
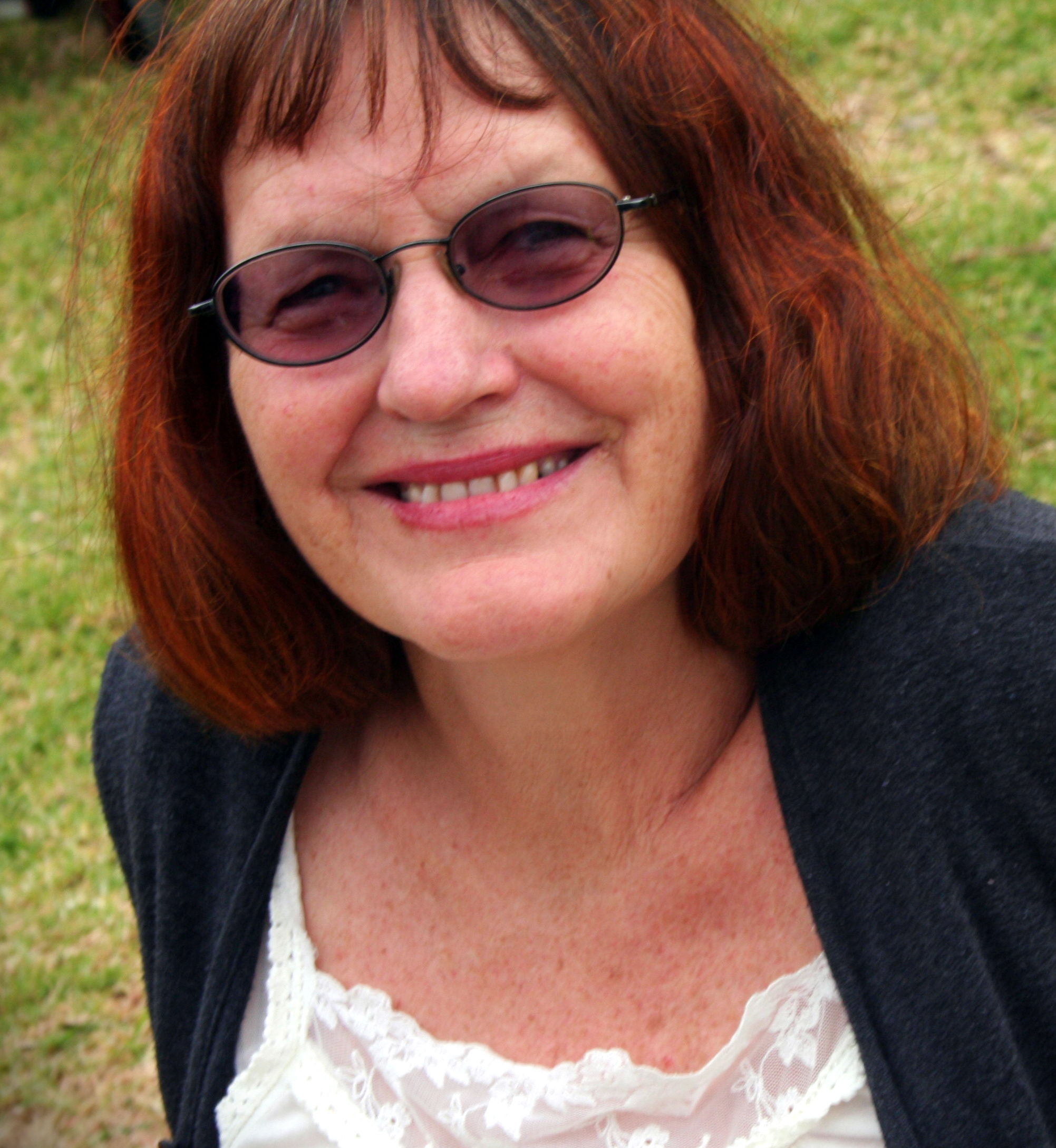
- Born: 22 March 1948; Wellington, New Zealand
- Died: 4 May 2017 (aged 69); Blue Mountains, Australia
- Citizenship: New Zealand and Australian
- Education: Auckland University; Victoria University of Wellington; University of Western Sydney
- Occupations: Novelist; poet; playwright; short-story writer; non-fiction writer; editor; lecturer
- Children: 2
- Writing career
- Genre: Contemporary fiction
- Notable awards: Officer of the Order of Australia; Bruce Mason Playwriting Award; Sydney PEN Award
- Website: www.thesecondevolution.com/rosie/

Rosie Scott AM (22 March 1948 – 4 May 2017) was a novelist, poet, playwright, short-story writer, non-fiction writer, editor and lecturer, with dual Australian and New Zealand citizenship.

== Early life and career ==
Rosie Scott was born in Wellington, New Zealand. Her father, Dick Scott, is a notable historian and journalist. She completed a BA and Graduate Diploma of Drama at Auckland University, and an MA(Hons) in English at Victoria University of Wellington. Scott worked in a variety of careers, including as a social worker and in publishing, before becoming a full-time writer.

== Work ==
Scott's first published work was a 1984 volume of poetry Flesh and Blood, followed by the play Say Thank You to the Lady, for which she won the prestigious Bruce Mason Playwriting Award in 1986. In 1988, at the age of 40, Scott published her first novel, Glory Days. It was shortlisted for the New Zealand Book Awards, and was published in New Zealand, Australia, Germany, UK and the US. Scott then published five more novels, a short story collection and a collection of essays.

Scott was active in the Australian writing community in her work for Sydney PEN and the Australian Society of Authors (ASA). Scott served on the board and the executive of the ASA for ten years, during which time she was elected chair. In 2005, she was appointed to a permanent honorary position on the ASA Council. She served as the Vice President of Sydney PEN, and was awarded the inaugural Sydney PEN Award in 2006 and was also awarded a Lifetime Membership of PEN.

Scott campaigned extensively on human rights issues in Australia, saying, "My writing is fuelled by me as a totality, but also by my political feelings." With Tom Keneally, she co-edited an anthology of refugee writing, Another Country, for which she was nominated for the 2004 Human Rights Medal. She was a co-founder of Women for Wik, a group dedicated to reconciliation with Aboriginal people in Australia. In 2013 Scott co-edited another anthology on asylum seekers with Tom Keneally called A Country Too Far with some of Australia's greatest writers including Anna Funder, Geraldine Brooks, Rodney Hall, Christos Tsiolkas, Les Murray, Alex Miller and Kim Scott. It was described as a 'stunning anthology and searing moral work... timely, important and wise.'. In 2014 she started the group "We're Better than This", a broad-based movement against refugee children in detention.

Scott completed a Diploma in Counselling and a Doctorate at the University of Western Sydney. She taught creative writing at the University of Technology Sydney, as well as working as a mentor for young and novice writers.

In 2016 Scott was appointed an Officer of the Order of Australia for significant service to literature as an author, and to human rights and inter-cultural understanding. Later that year she was the recipient of the NSW Premier's Special Award for her "significant service to literature as an author".

== Critical response ==
Scott has been called a "significant voice in contemporary women's fiction" in Australia. Marilyn Stasio, reviewing Glory Days in the New York Times Book Review, described Scott's writing as "an introspective voice that's rich in poetry and raw with anguish". Writing in The Australian in 1990, John Macgregor described Nights With Grace as "one of the finest Antipodean novels of recent times". Faith Singer was chosen for the Orange Prize's 50 Essential Reads by Contemporary Writers in 2004. Her work has been shortlisted for the New South Wales Premier's Literary Awards, the Banjo Patterson Award, the New Zealand Book Awards and the Biennial Adelaide Festival Award.

== Personal life ==
Scott was married to the director and writer, Danny Vendramini, and had two daughters. She died on 4 May 2017, from a brain tumour.

== Bibliography ==
=== Novels ===
- Glory Days (1988)
- Nights with Grace (1990)
- Feral City (1992)
- Lives on Fire (1993)
- Movie Dreams (1995)
- Faith Singer (2003)

=== Short story collections ===
- Queen of Love (1989)

=== Poetry ===
- Flesh and Blood (1984)

=== Plays ===
- Say Thank You to the Lady (1985)

=== Non-fiction and autobiography ===
- The Red Heart (1999)

=== Editor ===
- Another Country (2014) (with Thomas Keneally)
- A Country Too Far (2004) (with Thomas Keneally)
- The Intervention (2015) with Anita Heiss
