= Royal Prince Edward Yacht Club =

Coordinates: 33°51′55″S 151°15′12″E

- Burgee
- Nickname: The Edwards
- Short name: RPEYC
- Founded: 1922
- Location: Wolseley Road, Point Piper, New South Wales, Australia
- Website: www.rpeyc.com.au

The Royal Prince Edward Yacht Club is a yacht club located on Wolseley Road, Point Piper, New South Wales, in Australia. The club was founded in 1922, and permission was obtained from Prince Edward to use his name.

The waterside site on Lady Martin's Beach in Felix Bay was purchased in the same year in which a purpose-built clubhouse and bowling green were constructed. Its first race was held on Saturday, 18 November 1922. In 1935, it was granted permission to use the prefix "Royal" although newspaper reports from its inception used this title.
