= Ruth Bedford =

Australian poet, novelist and playwright (1882–1963)

Ruth M. Bedford
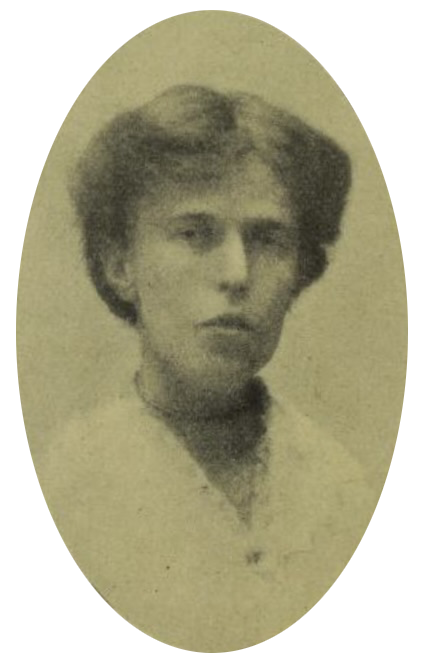
- Born: Ruth Marjory Bedford; 2 August 1882; Petersham, New South Wales, Australia
- Died: 24 July 1963 (aged 80); Paddington, New South Wales, Australia
- Occupations: Poet; Novelist; Playwright

Ruth Bedford (2 August 1882 – 24 July 1963) was an Australian poet, playwright and fiction writer.

== Career ==
Ruth Bedford was born in Petersham, Sydney, to Alfred Percival Bedford and Agnes Victoria Stephen, daughter of Sir Alfred Stephen, an influential chief justice, whose family she wrote about in her humorous book A Family Chronicle (1954).

Bedford and her sisters Sylvia and Alfreda were educated at home by governesses. Bedford proved a talented verse writer from an early age: her first book, Rhymes by Ruth was published when she was eleven years old in 1893 (revised and reprinted 1896).

Bedford wrote a number of poems for various Australian newspapers, especially The Sydney Morning Herald, where her poetry appeared over a 30-year period. The Brisbane Courier described her as a poet who "writes attractive verse, reflective and sensitive to a degree."

In 1931, Bedford established the Sydney PEN Centre in collaboration with her friend, the poet Dorothea Mackellar. As honorary secretary she traveled to Buenos Aires as the club's representative in 1936. Bedford was also honorary secretary of the Zonta Club in Sydney in 1933 and a member of the Women's Pioneer Society.

In 1953 Bedford received a grant from the Commonwealth Literary Fund to publish her chronicle of the Bedford and Stephen families, which was largely based on the diaries kept by her grandmother from 1846 to 1886.

Bedford never married and died in Paddington, New South Wales in 1963.

== Bibliography ==
=== Novels ===
- The Little Blue Devil with Dorothea Mackellar (1912)
- Two's Company with Dorothea Mackellar (1914)
- Hundreds and Thousands (1934) children's fiction, illustrated by Pixie O'Harris

=== Poetry ===
- Rhymes (1893)
- Sydney at Sunset and Other Verses (1911)
- Rosycheeks and Goldenhead (1914)
- Fairies and Fancies (1929) children's poetry
- The Learner and Other Verses (1937)
- Who's Who in Rhyme and Without Reason (1948)

=== Drama ===
- Fear: A play in blank verse (1930)
- The Murder Next Door (1931)
- Postman's Knock (1932)

=== Biography ===
- Think of Stephen: a family chronicle (1954)

=== Libretto ===
- Cross Words and Cross Currents (1925)
