= The Closed Door and Other Verses =

1911 poetry collection by Dorothea Mackellar

- Author: Dorothea Mackellar
- Language: English
- Genre: Poetry collection
- Publisher: Australian Authors' Agency
- Publication date: 1911
- Publication place: Australia
- Media type: Print
- Pages: 70 pp.

The Closed Door and Other Verses is a collection of poems by Australian poet Dorothea Mackellar, published by Angus and Robertson in 1911.

The collection contains 33 poems from a variety of sources, including London Spectator, Harper's Magazine, The Bulletin, Sunday Times (Sydney), Bush Brother, Southern Sphere and Appleton's Magazine, with some being published here for the first time.

The collection includes the first book publication of Mackellar's best known poem, "My Country".

== Contents ==
- "The Closed Door"
- "My Country"
- "Colour"
- "Spring on the Plains"
- "The Grey Lake (Lake Eyre, SA)"
- "A Happy Ghost"
- "Running Water"
- "Settlers"
- "The Open Sea"
- "Burning Off"
- "The Santa Maria"
- "Pilgrim Song"
- "Vespers"
- "Culgai Paddock"
- "When it Comes"
- "Sketch (Hyde Park, Sydney)"
- "Sketch"
- "Blue and Silver"
- "Magic"
- "The Coorong Sandhills (South Australia)"
- "Fire"
- "The Gates of El Dorado"
- "The Dream Soul"
- "The Night Wind"
- "In a Southern Garden"
- "Night on the Plains"
- "Non Penso a Lei (Canzone Ferrandini)"
- "Dawn"
- "Two Japanese Songs : 1 : The Heart of a Bird"
- "Two Japanese Songs : 2 : A Smoke Song"
- "The Dreamer"
- "Lost Days"
- "Up Country"

== Critical reception ==
A reviewer in The Bulletin noted that from "the muddy greys of Lake Eyre to the hectic green of a Sydney park at night, all the colors of Australia seem to have been captured in these verses." They concluded their review with the statement that the "quality of this book, its freshness and sincerity, put the author in the front rank of those who are now writing verse in Australia."

In The Sydney Morning Herald a reviewer praised Mackellar for not writing bush rhymes or backclock ballads: "Miss Mackellar is essentially Australian in her point of view, but perhaps the first interest of her work for the reader of Australian poetry jaded into utter weariness by its stereotyped effort after Australian atmosphere is in the fact that she does manage to escape the inanities of the typical versifier of our country."

== See also ==
- 1911 in Australian literature
