= Dorothea Mackellar =

Australian poet (1885–1968)

Dorothea Mackellar OBE
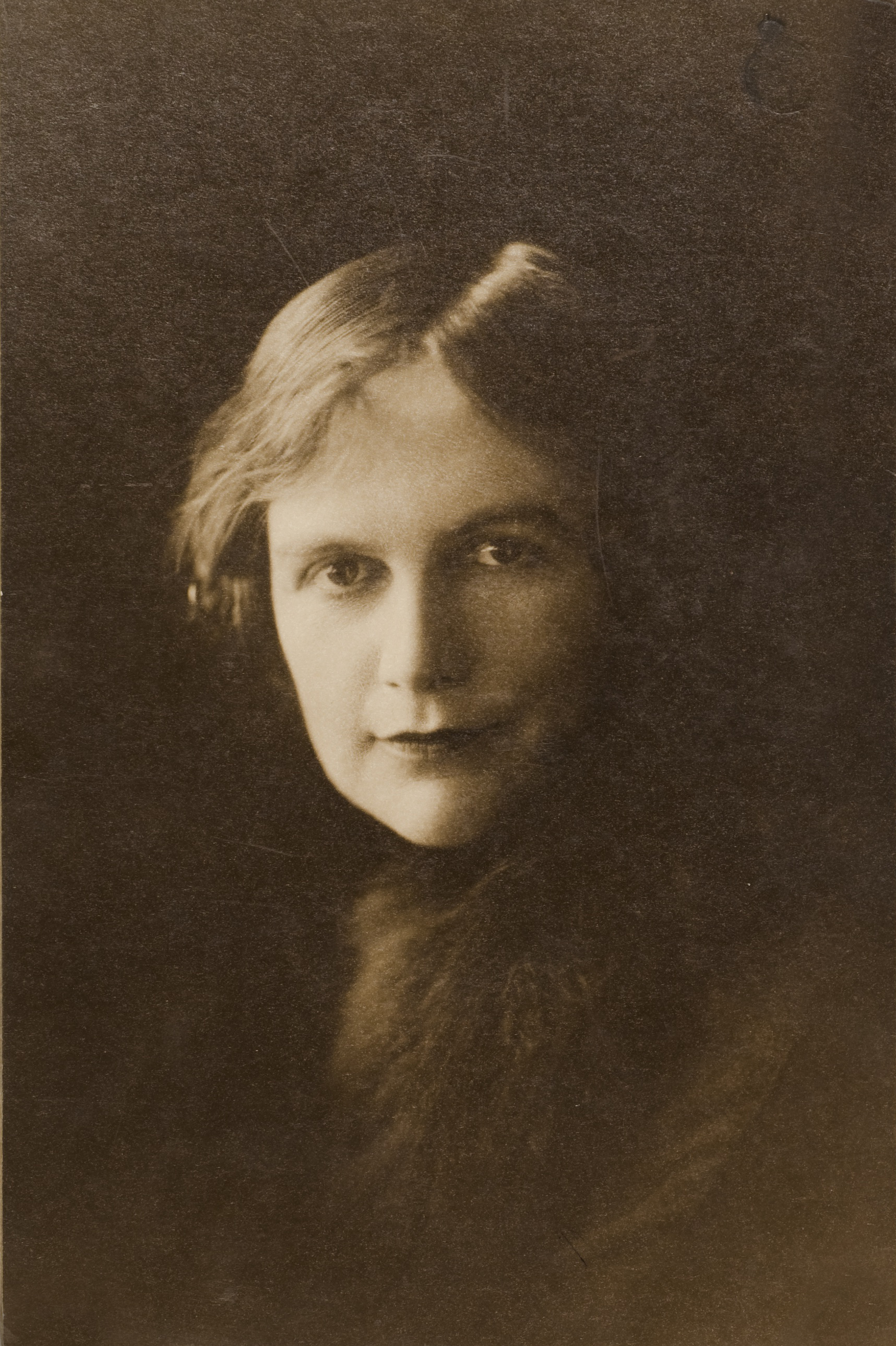
- Dorothea Mackellar, 1927, by May Moore
- Born: Isobel Marion Dorothea Mackellar; 1 July 1885; Dunara, Point Piper, Sydney, New South Wales, Australia
- Died: 14 January 1968 (aged 82); Paddington, Sydney, New South Wales
- Resting place: Waverley Cemetery
- Occupation: Poet
- Relatives: Sir Charles Mackellar (father)
- Writing career
- Genres: Poetry
- Notable work: "My Country"

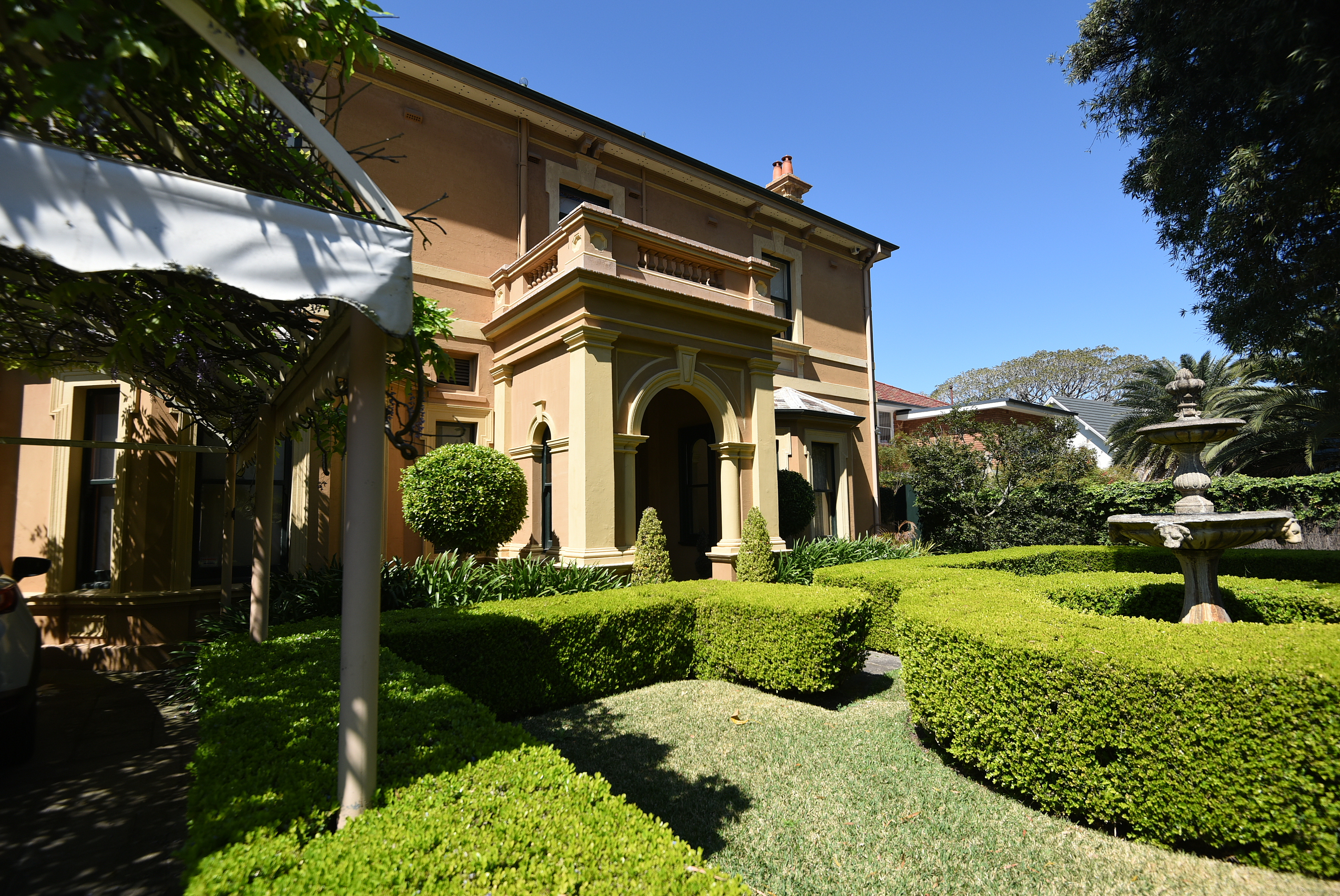
Dunara, Mackellar's childhood home in Point Piper

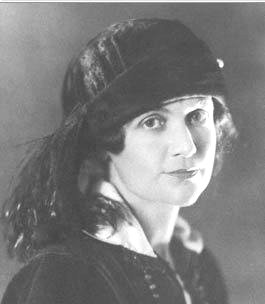
Dorothea Mackellar, Australian poet

Isobel Marion Dorothea Mackellar OBE (1 July 1885 – 14 January 1968) was an Australian poet and fiction writer. Her poem "My Country" is widely known in Australia, especially its second stanza, which begins: "I love a sunburnt country / A land of sweeping plains, / Of ragged mountain ranges, / Of droughts and flooding rains."

== Life ==
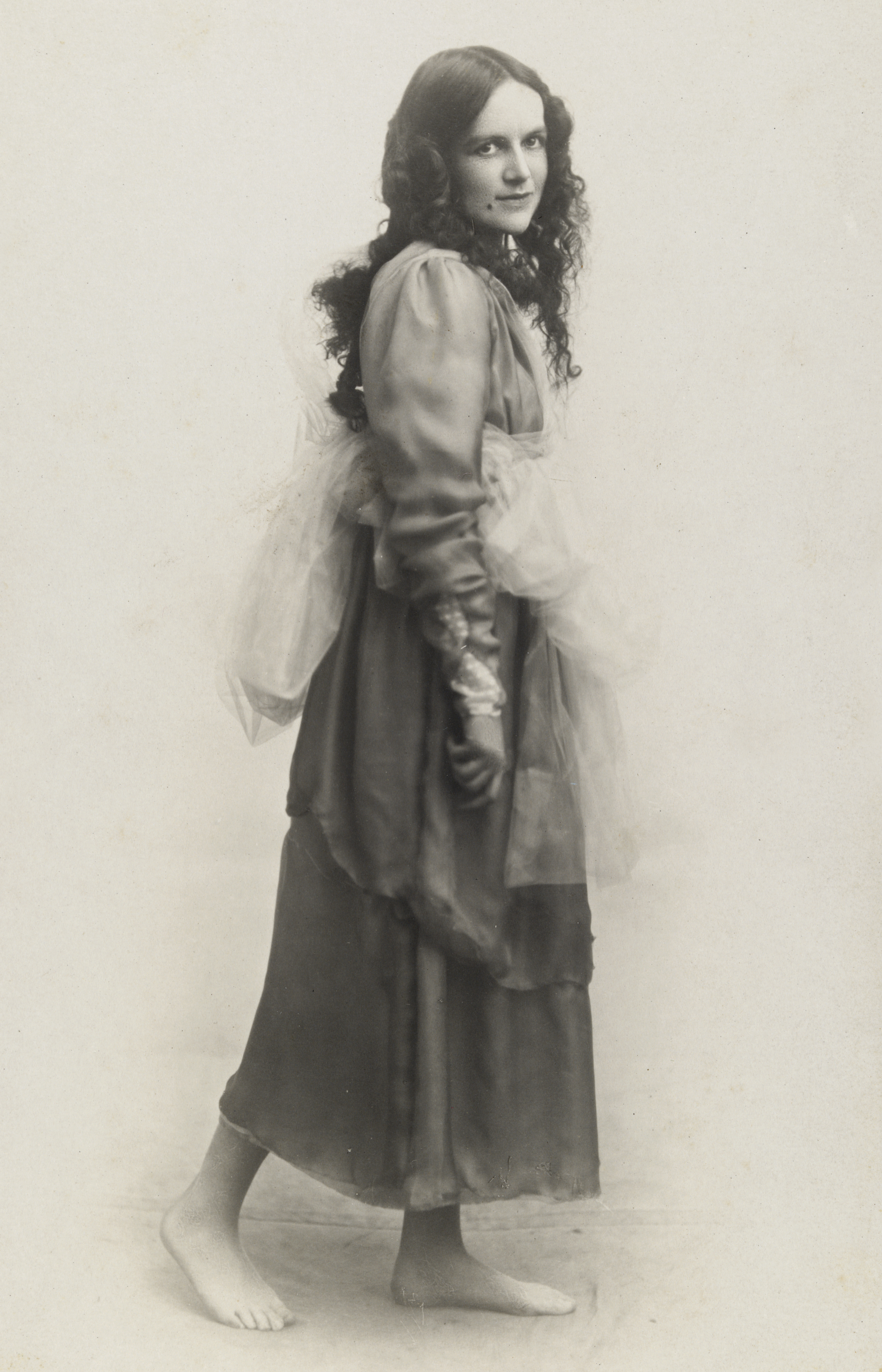
Mackellar dressed as one of the Graces for Mrs. T.H. Kelly's Italian Red Cross Day tableaux at the Palace Theatre, 20 June 1918

The third child and sole daughter of physician and parliamentarian Sir Charles Mackellar and his wife Marion Mackellar (née Buckland, the daughter of Thomas Buckland), Dorothea Mackellar was born in the family home Dunara at Point Piper, Sydney, Australia in 1885. Mackellar was of the Anglican faith. Her later home was Cintra at Darling Point (built in 1882 by John Mackintosh for his son James), and in 1925, she commissioned a summer cottage (in reality a substantial home with colonnaded verandah overlooking Pittwater), "Tarrangaua" at Lovett Bay, an isolated location on Pittwater reachable only by boat (this home was the residence of the novelist and author Susan Duncan and her husband, Bob Story, and features prominently in a number of Duncan's books). A woman of independent means, Mackellar published poetry and other works between 1908 and 1926 and was active in the Sydney literary scene of the 1930s, being involved with the Sydney Publishers, Editors and Novelists Club, the Bush Book Club of New South Wales and the Sydney PEN Centre. In her later years she ceased writing and, suffering poor health, her last eleven years were spent in a nursing home in Randwick where she died in 1968, aged 82. Her memorial service was held at St Mark's Anglican Church in Darling Point, and she is buried in Waverley Cemetery, in the eastern suburbs of Sydney.

She built up a personal library of 300 books, mostly on poetry and literature. Many were signed by their authors. She outlived her siblings and died a relatively wealthy woman, leaving an estate valued for probate at $1,580,000 (equivalent to $21,981,827 in 2022).

== Literary works ==
Although she was raised in a professional urban family, Mackellar's poetry is usually regarded as quintessential bush poetry, inspired by her experience on her brothers' farms near Gunnedah, in the north-west of New South Wales. Her best-known poem is "My Country", written at the age of 19 while overseas in England, and first published in the London Spectator in 1908 under the title "Core of My Heart": the second stanza of this poem is among the best known in Australia. Four volumes of her collected verse were published: The Closed Door (published in 1911, contained the first appearance of "My Country"); The Witch Maid, and Other Verses (1914); Dreamharbour (1923); and Fancy Dress (1926). In addition to writing poems, Mackellar also wrote novels, one by herself, Outlaw's Luck (1913), and at least two in collaboration with childhood friend Ruth Bedford. These are The Little Blue Devil (1912) and Two's Company (1914). According to Dale Spender, little has been written or is yet known about the circumstances behind this collaboration.

== Honours ==
In the New Year's Day Honours of 1968, Mackellar was appointed an Officer of the Order of the British Empire for her contribution to Australian literature. She died two weeks later in Paddington, New South Wales, after a fall. Her memorial service was held at St Mark's Anglican Church in Darling Point. She is buried with her father and family in Waverley Cemetery overlooking the open ocean. Her poem "Colour", her own favourite, was read at the service.

== Legacy ==
A federal electorate covering half of Sydney's Northern Beaches is named in her honour, as well as Mackellar Crescent in the Canberra suburb of Cook and Dorothea Mackellar Avenue in the Melbourne suburb of Oakleigh East.

On Australia Day, 26 January 1983, a memorial to Mackellar was unveiled and dedicated in ANZAC Park, Gunnedah. The centrepiece of the memorial, a statue of Mackellar on horseback by Dennis Adams, was a temporary fibreglass version. The finished bronze version was installed in September 1983. In conjunction with the January unveiling, there was an exhibition of a series of 34 water colour paintings by Jean Isherwood illustrating "My Country". The watercolours were eventually put on permanent display in the Gunnedah Bicentennial Regional Gallery. Isherwood set about painting a series of oils based on the watercolours which were exhibited at the Artarmon Galleries in Sydney in 1986.

In 1984, Gunnedah resident Mikie Maas created the "Dorothea Mackellar Poetry Awards", which has grown into a nationwide poetry competition for Australian school students.

== Bibliography ==
=== Novels ===
- The Little Blue Devil (1912) with Ruth M. Bedford
- Outlaw's Luck (1913)
- Two's Company (1914) with Ruth M. Bedford

=== Poetry collections ===
- The Closed Door and Other Verses (1911)
- The Witch-Maid and Other Verses (1914)
- Dreamhabour and Other Verses (1923)
- My Country and Other Poems (1945)
- The Poems of Dorothea Mackellar (1971)
- A Poet's Journey (2005)

=== Autobiography ===
- I Love a Sunburnt Country : The Diaries of Dorothea MacKellar, edited by Jyoti Brunsdon (1990)

=== Selected list of poems ===
Title	Year	First published	Reprinted/collected in
"My Country" (aka "Core of My Heart")	1891	Spectator, 5 September 1908	The Closed Door and Other Verses, Australian Authors' Agency, 1911, pp. 9–11

== Archives At ==
- Mackellar family papers, 1783-1968, with associated material, 1833–1894, State Library of NSW, MLMSS 1959/Boxes 1-4, 6, 8-19, 21-22, MLMSS 1959/Items 5X, 7X, MLMSS 1959/Box 20X
- Dorothea Mackellar unpublished writings and other materials State Library of NSW, MLMSS 11080
- Box 16 Item IV/C: Dorothea Mackellar Verses, State Library of NSW, SAFE/MLMSS 1959/Box 16/Item IV/C (Safe 1/117)
- Letters from Dorothea Mackellar to Evelyn Fanning, 1930–1939, State Library of NSW, MLMSS 7647
