= Susan Duncan =

Australian author and journalist (1951–2024)

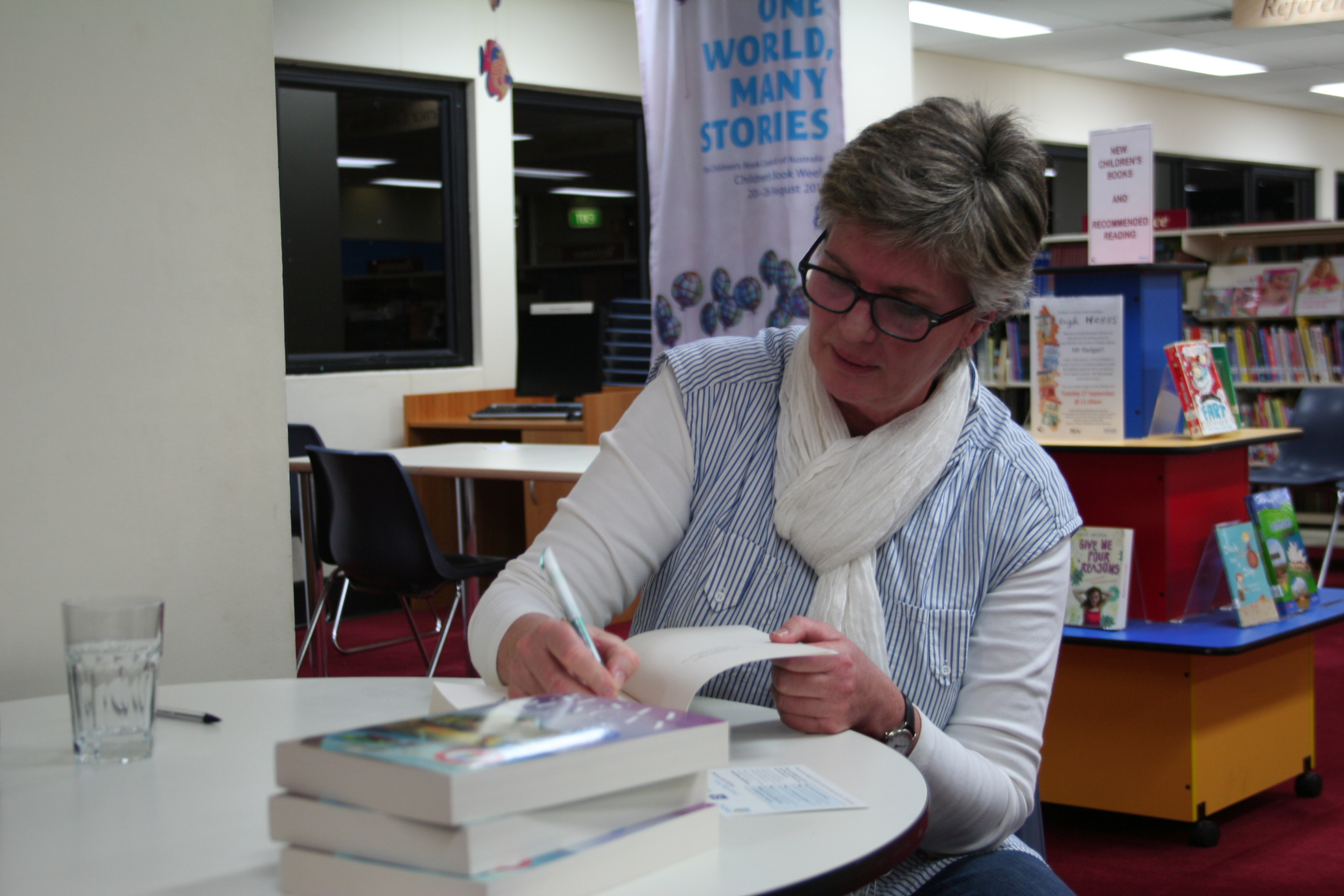
- Duncan in 2011
- Born: 1951; Albury, New South Wales
- Died: 30 November 2024 (aged 72–73)

Susan Elizabeth Duncan (1951 – 30 November 2024) was an Australian author, journalist and editor of The Australian Women's Weekly and New Idea.

== Life and career ==
After being diagnosed with breast cancer in 1999, Duncan had a mastectomy and chemotherapy. A cancer survivor, she was an active supporter of breast cancer awareness.

Duncan was married twice. Her first husband died from a brain tumour. Duncan lived in New South Wales with her second husband, Bob. They had homes at Pittwater and the mid-north coast of New South Wales. The Pittwater home, on Lovett Bay, is called Tarrangaua and was built for poet Dorothea Mackellar in 1925.

Duncan died on 30 November 2024, shortly before publication of her latest novel, Finding Joy in Oyster Bay.

== Bibliography ==
- Susan Duncan (2006). Salvation Creek: An Unexpected Life. Milsons Point: Random House. ISBN 1-86325-474-9.
- Susan Duncan (2008). The House at Salvation Creek. North Sydney: Random House. ISBN 978-1-86325-648-3.
- Susan Duncan (2009). A Life on Pittwater. North Sydney: Random House. ISBN 978-1-74166-669-4.
- Susan Duncan (2011). The Briny Cafe. North Sydney: Bantam. ISBN 978-1-74166-820-9.
- Susan Duncan (2013). Gone Fishing. North Sydney: Random House. ISBN 978-0-85798-075-5.
- Susan Duncan (2016). The House on the Hill. North Sydney: Random House. ISBN 978-0-14-378050-2.
- Susan Duncan (2024). Finding Joy in Oyster Bay. North Sydney: Allen & Unwin. ISBN 978-1-76-147154-4.
