= Dick Scott (historian) =

New Zealand historian and journalist (1923–2020)

Dick Scott ONZM
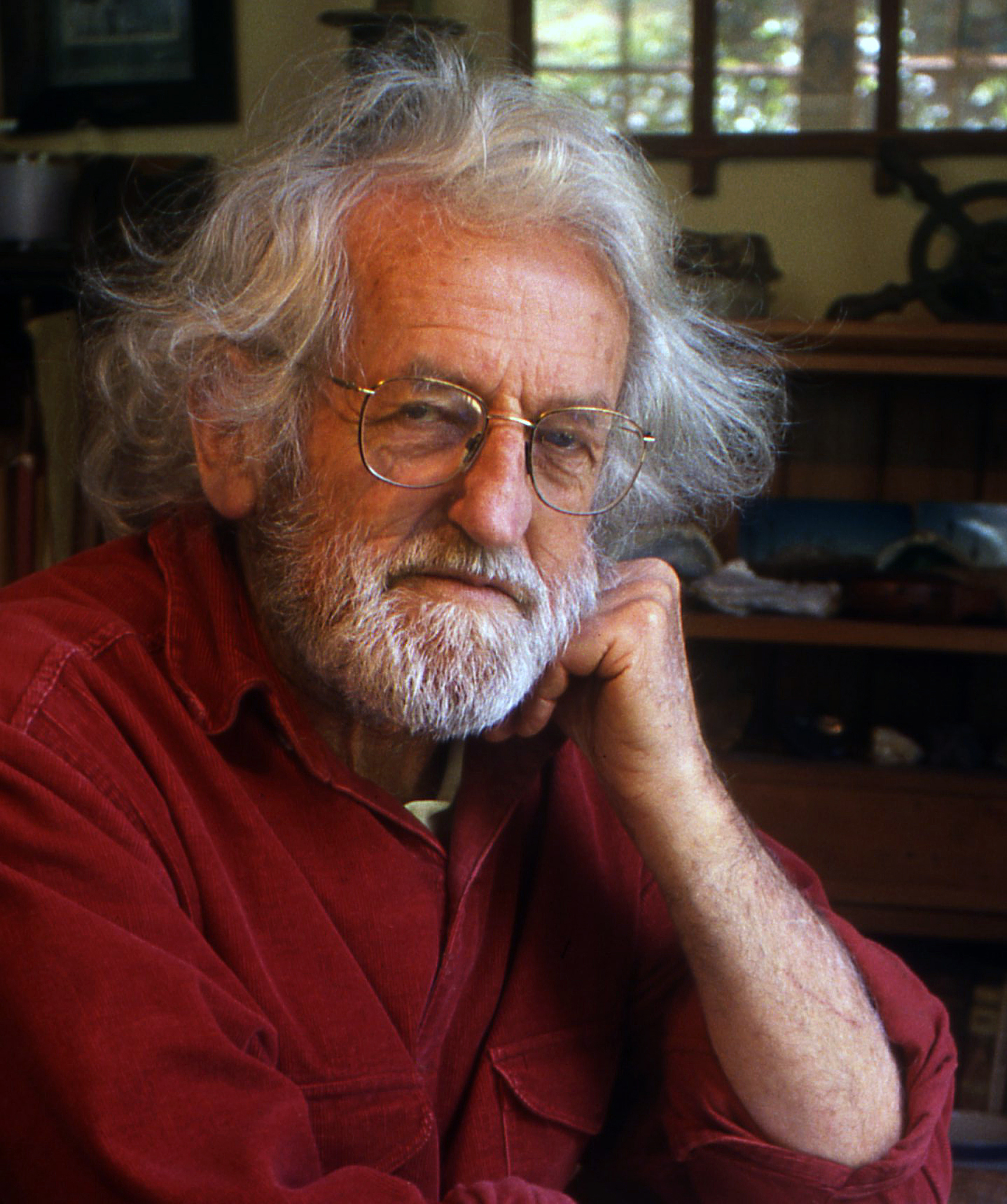
- Born: Richard George Scott; 17 November 1923; Palmerston North, New Zealand
- Died: 1 January 2020 (aged 96)
- Education: Massey College
- Relatives: Rosie Scott (daughter)
- Writing career
- Language: English
- Genre: Non-fiction
- Subjects: New Zealand and Pacific history
- Notable awards: Prime Minister's Award for Literary Achievement

Richard George Scott ONZM (17 November 1923 – 1 January 2020) was a New Zealand historian and journalist.

== Work ==
Scott's first book, 151 Days (1952), was an account of the 1951 New Zealand waterfront dispute. It has been described as capturing "the dark days of that winter of discontent with an energy and immediacy, lost by subsequent more dispassionate accounts."

His most well-known work is Ask That Mountain (1975), which recounts the events of the non-violent Māori resistance to European occupation at Parihaka. " The story had largely been forgotten by non-Māori New Zealanders until the book's publication. It has been reprinted nine times, and former New Zealand Prime Minister Helen Clark called it "one of New Zealand's most influential books". Historian Kerry Taylor says Ask That Mountain was "fundamental to a change in Pākehā consciousness to the darker reality of colonialism." Scott also published an earlier, briefer account of the events in 1954, The Parihaka Story. He later claimed that Ask That Mountain was the historical work he was most proud of.

Scott wrote several histories related to the Auckland region, such as In Old Mount Albert: Being a History of the District (1961), Fire on the Clay: The Pakeha Comes to West Auckland (1979) and Seven Lives on Salt River (1979), which won the New Zealand Book Award for Non-Fiction and the J M Sherrard prize for regional history.

He also wrote more general New Zealand works, including Inheritors of a Dream: A Pictorial History of New Zealand (1962) and Winemakers of New Zealand (1964), and Pacific histories such as Years of the Pooh-Bah: A Cook Islands History (1991) and Would a Good Man Die? Niue Island, New Zealand, and the late Mr Larsen (1993).

In 2004, Scott published his autobiography, Dick Scott: A Radical Writer's Life, which recounted his early years in the Communist Party, as well as his writing approach and career.

== Honours and awards ==
Scott was appointed an Officer of the New Zealand Order of Merit, for services to historical research, in the 2002 Queen's Birthday and Golden Jubilee Honours, and in 2007 he received the Prime Minister's Award for Literary Achievement (Non-Fiction). In 2016 he was awarded an Honorary Doctorate from Massey University's College of Humanities and Social Sciences in recognition of the influence of his historical research and writing.

== Personal life ==
Raised on a farm at Whakarongo near Palmerston North, Scott attended Palmerston North Boys' High before completing a Diploma of Agriculture at Massey University. Working as a sharemilker, he studied socialism and joined the Communist Party. He became a journalist, and during the 1951 waterfront dispute edited the watersiders' newspaper Transport Worker and wrote illegal bulletins.

Scott's concern for social justice led him to tell the story of Parihaka. As historian Jock Phillips said of Scott: "although he had not met a Māori person until the age of 20 and did not know te Reo, he recognised injustice immediately when he came across it and became convinced the story should be told."

Scott had five children, four with his first wife Elsie du Fresne (d. 1991), and lived with his second wife in the suburb of Mount Eden, in Auckland, New Zealand. One of his children was the novelist Rosie Scott.

In 2011, Scott made headlines when he auctioned a Don Binney painting that he had owned for almost 50 years, and donated the NZD $300,000 proceeds to the Christchurch earthquake appeal.

Scott died on 1 January 2020, at the age of 96.

== Selected works ==
- 151 Days (1952) Penguin. ISBN 0-7900-0783-5
- The Parihaka Story (1954) Southern Cross Books.
- In Old Mount Albert: Being a History of the District (1961) Southern Cross Books.
- Inheritors of a Dream: A Pictorial History of New Zealand (1962) Longman Paul. ISBN 0-582-73815-6
- Winemakers of New Zealand (1964) Southern Cross Books.
- Stock in Trade: Hellaby’s First Hundred Years (1973) Southern Cross Books.
- Ask That Mountain: The Story of Parihaka (1975) Heinemann. ISBN 0-14-301086-7
- Stake in the Country: Assid Abraham Corban (1977) Reed Books. ISBN 0-7900-0875-0
- Fire on the Clay: The Pakeha Comes to West Auckland (1979) Southern Cross Books.
- Seven Lives on Salt River (1979) Penguin. ISBN 0-7900-0708-8
- Years of the Pooh-Bah: A Cook Islands History (1991) Cook Islands Trading Corporation. ISBN 0-340-55489-4
- Would a Good Man Die? Niue Island, New Zealand, and the late Mr Larsen (1993) Hodder & Stoughton. ISBN 0-340-59953-7
- Pioneers of New Zealand wine (2002) Reed Books/Southern Cross Books. ISBN 0-7900-0832-7
- Dick Scott: A Radical Writer's Life (2004) Reed Books. ISBN 0-7900-0976-5
