= Charles Mackellar =

Australian politician

The Honourable Sir Charles Mackellar KCMG
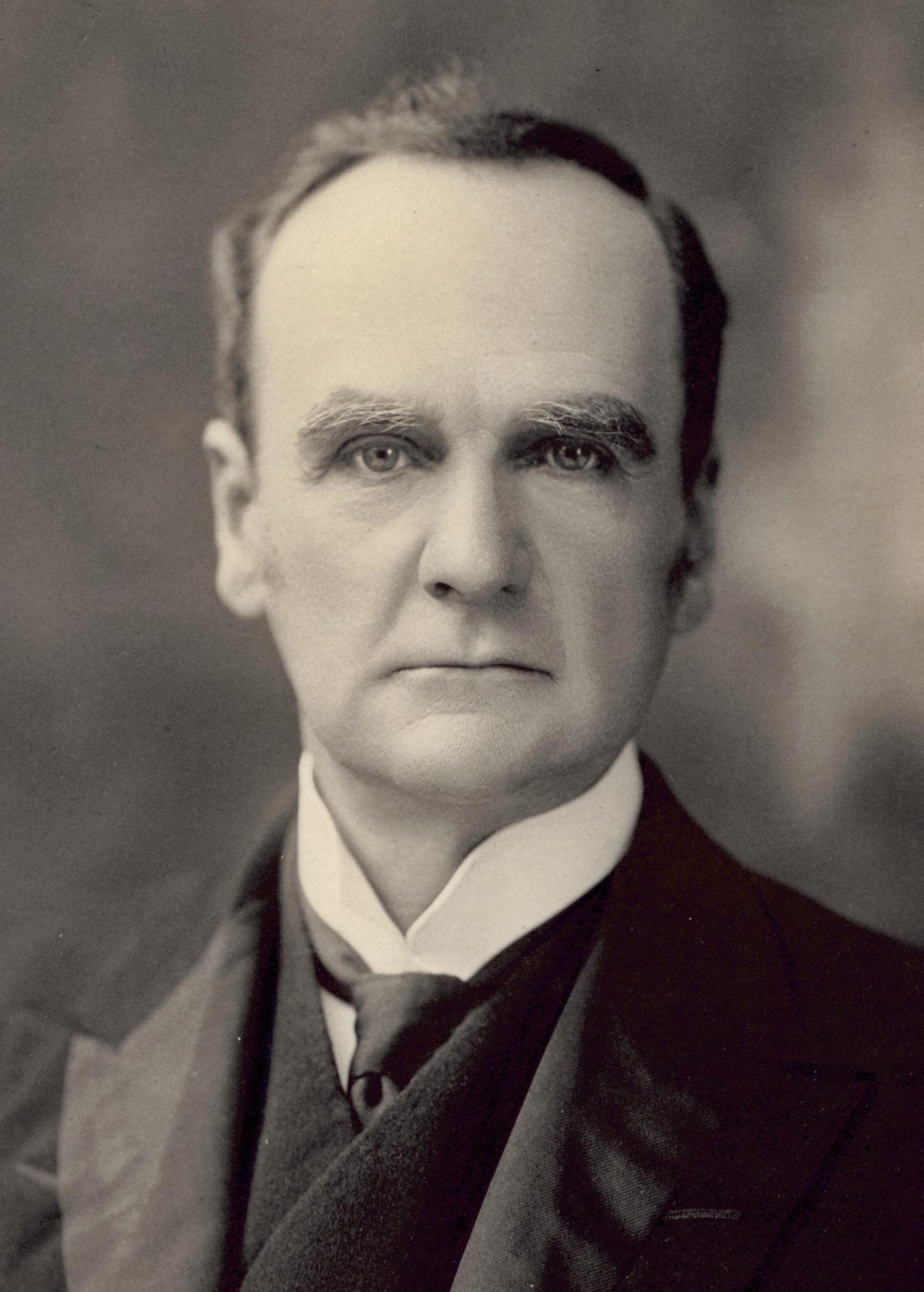

Senator for New South Wales
- In office 8 October 1903 – 30 November 1903
- Preceded by: Richard O'Connor

Member of the Legislative Council of New South Wales
- In office 8 September 1885 – 19 October 1903
- Appointed by: Lord Augustus Loftus
- In office 26 November 1903 – 24 June 1925
- Appointed by: Sir Harry Rawson

Personal details
- Born: 5 December 1844 Sydney, New South Wales, Australia
- Died: 14 July 1926 (aged 81) Sydney, New South Wales, Australia
- Party: Protectionist Party
- Spouse: Marion Buckland
- Children: Dorothea Mackellar
- Occupation: Physician, surgeon, politician

Sir Charles Kinnaird Mackellar KCMG (5 December 1844 – 14 July 1926) was an Australian politician and surgeon. He served in the New South Wales Legislative Council from 1885 to 1925, with the exception of a period of 50 days in 1903 when he filled a casual vacancy in the Senate. He was the father of poet and writer Dorothea Mackellar.

== Early life ==
Charles Mackellar was born in Sydney, the only son of Dr Frank Mackellar (a physician from Dundee, Scotland), and his wife, Isabella (née Robertson; widow of William McGarvie). Charles was educated at Sydney Grammar School and then moved to Port Macquarie district. After leaving school had spent several years working on the land.

Around 1866, he studied at the University of Glasgow, graduated MB and Ch.M. in 1871. He then returned to Australia and registered with the Medical Board of New South Wales on 25 March 1872 and established a successful practice as a physician. Mackellar was honorary surgeon at the Sydney Infirmary and Dispensary 1873–77 (known as Sydney Hospital from 1881). Mackellar became very good friends with Normand MacLaurin, who joined the staff of Sydney Infirmary and Dispensary in 1873.

Around 1882–1883, he developed Dunara in Point Piper as his principal place of residence.

== Other interests ==
Mackellar succeeded his father-in-law, Thomas Buckland, as a director of the Bank of New South Wales in 1896. Mackellar was later president of the bank for most of the years 1901–1923. Mackellar was also chairman of the Gloucester Estate Co., chairman of the Mutual Life & Citizens' Assurance Co. Ltd; he had been a trustee in 1911–14. He was also a director of Pitt, Son & Badgery Ltd, the Union Trustee Co. of Australia Ltd, United Insurance Co. Ltd, Royal Insurance Co. Ltd, Colonial Sugar Refining Co., Australian Widows' Fund, and Equitable Life Assurance Co. Ltd of which he was medical director. He was surgeon in the Volunteer Rifles from 1872; chairman of the medical section of the Royal Society of New South Wales in 1881; founding councillor and in 1883–84 president of the New South Wales branch of the British Medical Association; examiner in medicine at the University of Sydney in 1889–1901; vice-president and in 1907–14 president of the Sydney Amateur Orchestral Society; inaugural vice-president of the Royal Society for the Welfare of Mothers and Babies in 1918; and a member of the Australian and Athenaeum clubs, Sydney.

== Personal life ==
He married in 1877, Marion, daughter of Thomas Buckland, who survived him with two sons and a daughter, Dorothea Mackellar, who became a famous poet and prose-writer.

Mackellar's health and memory started to decline from 1923 and he died at Sydney, on 14 July 1926; he was buried in the Anglican section of Waverley Cemetery.

Political offices
Preceded by George Bowen Simpson	Representative of the Government in the Legislative Council; 1886	Succeeded by John Burns
Vacant Title last held by Sir Patrick Jennings	Vice-President of the Executive Council; 1886	Succeeded by Sir Henry Parkes
Preceded by James Fletcher	Secretary for Mines; Dec 1886 – Jan 1887	Succeeded by Francis Abigail
Business positions
Preceded by James Walker	President of the Bank of New South Wales; 1901 – 1922	Succeeded by Sir Thomas Buckland
