= Royal Motor Yacht Club of New South Wales =

Coordinates: 33°52′1″S 151°15′15″E

- Ensign
- Short name: RMYC
- Founded: 1905
- Location: Point Piper, New South Wales, Australia
- Website: Royal Motor Yacht Club NSW

The Royal Motor Yacht Club of New South Wales is a club for motorboat owners located at 21 Wunulla Road, Point Piper.

The club was founded in 1905 as the Motor Boat Club of New South Wales. At its foundation it had 92 members, all boat owners. Philip Mitchell was elected commodore, Dr George Reid vice-commodore and Frank Albert (of Albert Music) rear-commodore. George W. Whatmore, who had initiated the club's formation by writing to The Sydney Morning Herald, became the first secretary, with Fred Wiesener as treasurer.

Members initially met at rooms at Circular Quay. In 1910 the current site was purchased and a clubhouse built. Officially opened by Lord Chelmsford, Governor of New South Wales, it was renamed Motor Yacht Club of New South Wales.

In 1927 it was granted permission to use the prefix "Royal".
