= Wolseley Road =

Road in Point Piper, New South Wales, Australia

Coordinates: 33.8660°S 151.2496°E

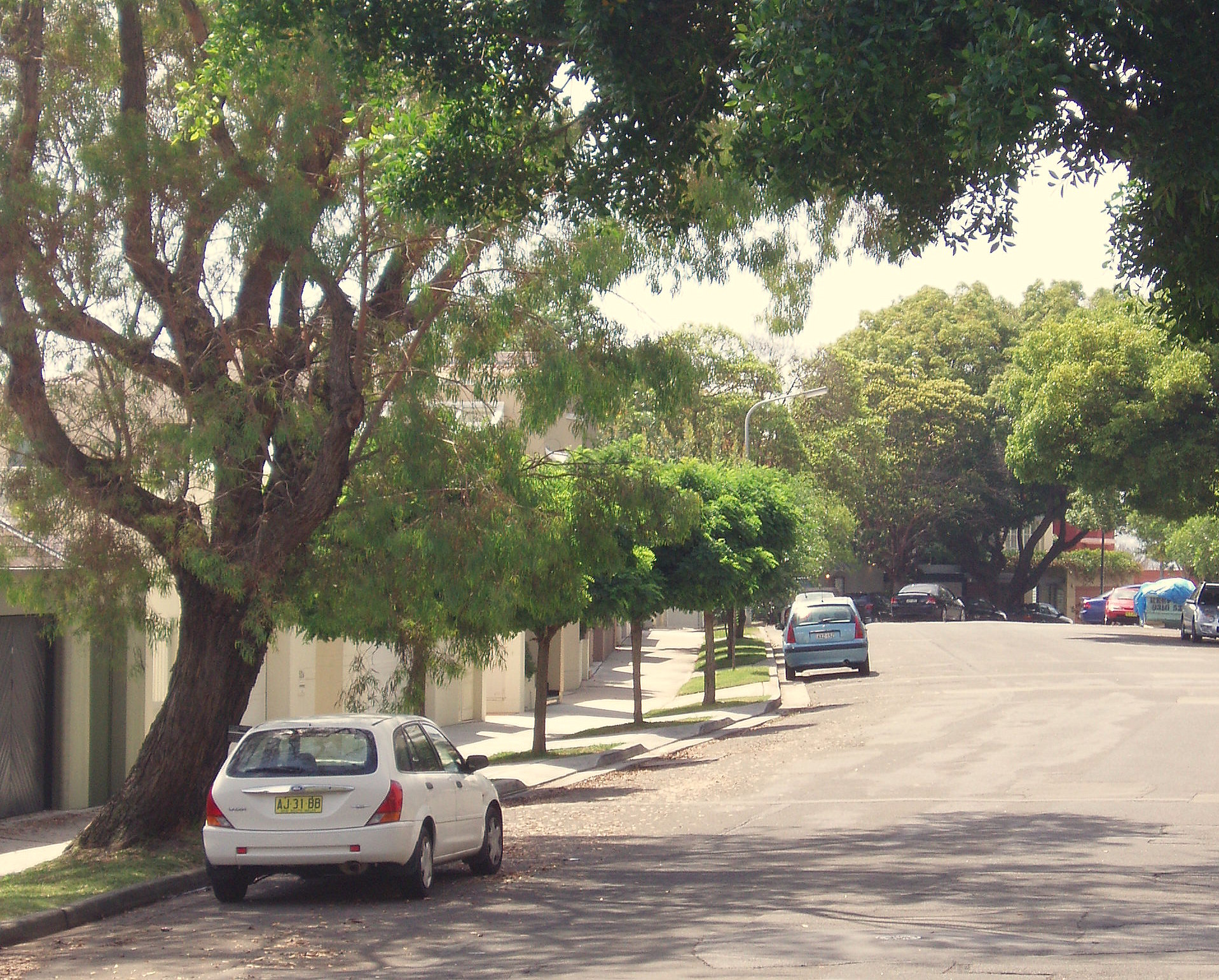
Wolseley Road, Point Piper

Wolseley Road is a road in the Sydney suburb of Point Piper. It is one kilometre long. It starts at New South Head Road and curves around the west side of Point Piper, terminating in a dead end above Lady Martins Beach.

== Description ==
As at 2002, Wolseley Road was the most expensive residential road/street in Australia with 16 of the top 100 most expensive houses in Sydney being located on it. Property writer Cindy Martin calculated in 2002 that the total value of the properties on the one-kilometre waterfront section of Wolseley Road was worth, in total, $720 million.

In 2007, the Andrew Banks property on Wolseley Road was made an offer of $50 million, which was declined. In 2022, 20 Wolseley Road sold for $45 million.

In 2015, it was named the sixth most expensive street in the world. Notable residents included Frank Lowy and Malcolm Turnbull.

== Housing styles ==
Houses in the area are designed according to the limited availability and price of land, as well as the physical nature of the location. There is considerable variety because every house is unique; in contrast to many Sydney suburbs, there has been no mass development with identical houses. The range of styles goes from Federation Arts and Crafts cottages to multi-storey mansions and some towers of home units.

== Heritage listings ==
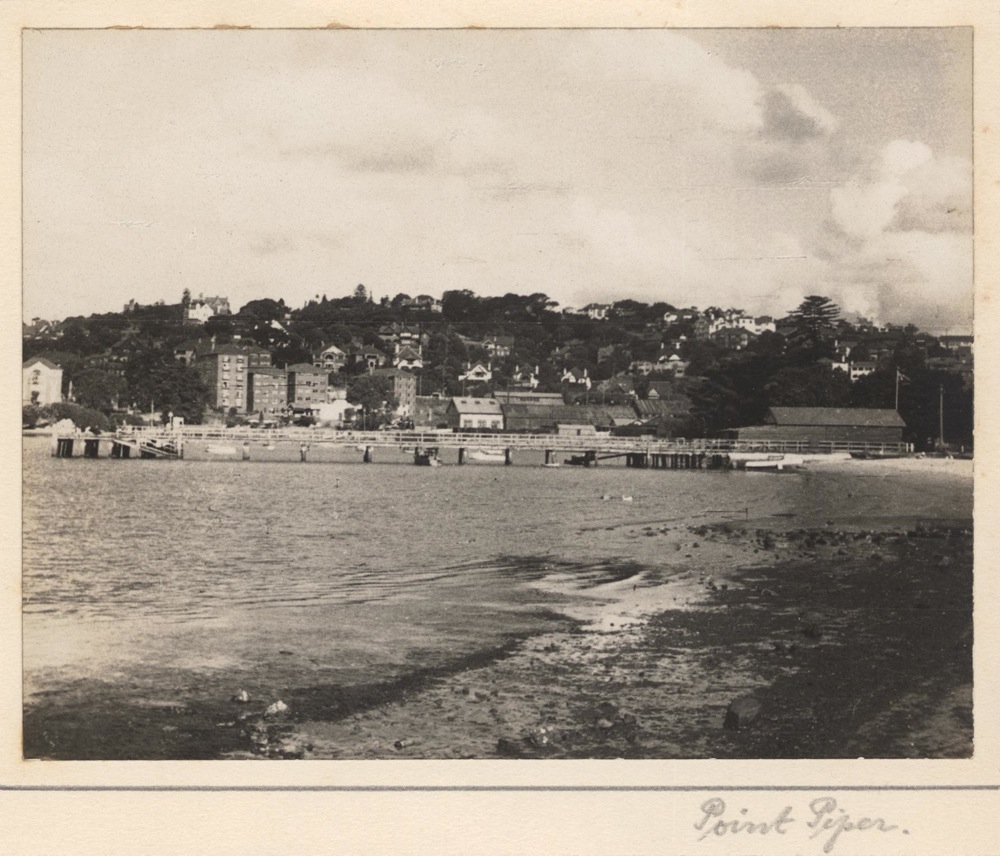
Note: Heritage listed Norfolk Island Pine (RHS), at the start of Wolseley Road, Point Piper

The following items are heritage listed by Woollahra Council:

- 16–18 Wolseley Road
- 20 Wolseley Road
- 28 Wolseley Road
- 63–67 Wolseley Road
- 66 Wolseley Road
- 69 Wolseley Road
- 134–136 Wolseley Road
- 138–140 Wolseley Road
- 142 Wolseley Road
- Lady Martins Beach
- Norfolk Island Pine
- Seven Shillings Beach
