= Sydney PEN =

Australian association of writers

- A global literary community
- Formation: 1931
- Type: Literary society
- Legal status: Association
- Purpose: Publication, advocacy, literary awards
- Headquarters: London, UK
- Location: Sydney, Australia
- Region served: Sydney
- Official language: English
- President: Zoë Rodriguez and Claudia Taranto
- Key people: Committee
- Parent organisation: International PEN
- Affiliations: Australian PEN
- Website: pen.org.au
- Remarks: Sydney PEN is an affiliate of International Pen and one of three Australian PENs'

Sydney PEN, also referred as International PEN Sydney Centre, is an association of Australian writers and readers, publishers, and human rights activists based in Sydney, New South Wales, Australia. Founded in 1931, it is one of the three Australian PEN Centres, which are affiliates of PEN International. PEN, founded in 1921, stands for "Poets, Essayists, and Novelists".

== History ==
Sydney PEN was founded in 1931 by Ethel Turner, Mary Gilmore, and Dorothea Mackellar. Since inception, it has conducted campaigns and events supporting literature, fostering international understanding and defending freedom of expression.

It was incorporated as an association on 27 January 2006 under the Associations Incorporations Act 1984 (NSW) as International Pen Sydney Centre, to be referred to as Sydney PEN.

== Description ==
PEN, founded in 1921, stands for "Poets, Essayists, and Novelists". Sydney PEN is an association of Australian writers and readers, publishers and human rights activists. Its aim is to promote literature and freedom of expression, as well as fostering local culture and understanding.

PEN Sydney is based at the Faculty of Arts & Social Sciences at University of Technology Sydney (UTS).

As of April 2024, Zoë Rodriguez and Claudia Taranto are joint presidents of Sydney PEN, and there are six other members of the management committee.

Sydney PEN is one of three PEN centres in Australia, the others being PEN Melbourne and PEN Perth.

== Campaigns ==
In 2008, Sydney PEN, together with International Pen, helped to release 94 writers from prison.

Its Writers in Prison program selects urgent regional cases that feature public advocacy campaigns. It has carried out campaigns for Father Nguyen Van Ly, Tashi Rabten, Liu Xia, Gheyret Niyaz, Liu Xianbin, Tan Zuoren, Liu Xiaobo, Nurnuhemmet Yasin, Ragip Zarakolu and Busra Ersanh.

== Recognition ==
In November 2004, Sydney PEN, as part of the Australian PEN network, won the Human Rights and Equal Opportunity Community Award for its work with asylum seeker writers held in Australian detention centres.

== Awards given ==
=== Sydney PEN Award ===
Established in 2006, Sydney PEN Award hosts annual awards that serve to recognise the members who has worked hard to promote the PEN Centre's value.

- Rosie Scott (2006)
- Nicholas Jose (2007)
- Chip Rolley (2008)
- Denise Leith (2009)
- Gaby Naher (2010)

=== PEN Keneally Award ===
Sydney PEN, along with other two Australian PEN Centres, established a new biennial award "PEN Keneally Award" in 2004, for recognising an achievement in promoting freedom of expression, international understanding and access to literature.

The award is named in the honour of Thomas Keneally AO for ‘his lifetime’s commitment to the values of PEN’.

== Publications ==
Sydney PEN Magazine is a bi-annual publication, which contains articles, news on PEN's work, interviews, literary publications, and translations. It is published in May, to accompany the PEN lecture at the Sydney Writers' Festival, and in November for the International Day of the Imprisoned Writer. It is co-sponsored by UTS and Copyright Agency Limited.

== Honorary and life members ==
Sydney PEN has several honorary members, including:

- Behrouz Boochani
- Liu Xiaobo (1955-2017)
- Father Nguyen Van Ly
- Mohammad Sadiq Kabudvand
- Ngawang Phulchung, Tibetan monk arrested for publishing the Universal Declaration of Human Rights in the Tibetan language in 1987; released in 2007 after serving one of the longest terms imprisonments of any political prisoner in Tibet
- Léster Luis González Pentón, arrested during the March 2003 Black Spring in Cuba; released 2010

A number of Australian writers are life members, including Thomas Keneally, Geraldine Brooks, J. M. Coetzee, David Malouf, and Ruby Langford Ginibi.

== See also ==
- International PEN
  - PEN America
  - PEN Canada
