= Women for Wik =

Women for Wik is an organisation of women, including Aboriginal, non-Aboriginal and non-Torres Strait Islanders, which has established an independent, rigorous, verifiable, complete and objective monitoring of the Australian Federal Government's intervention in the Northern Territory and an Australian travel guide and information service.
