= My Country =

Poem by Dorothea Mackellar

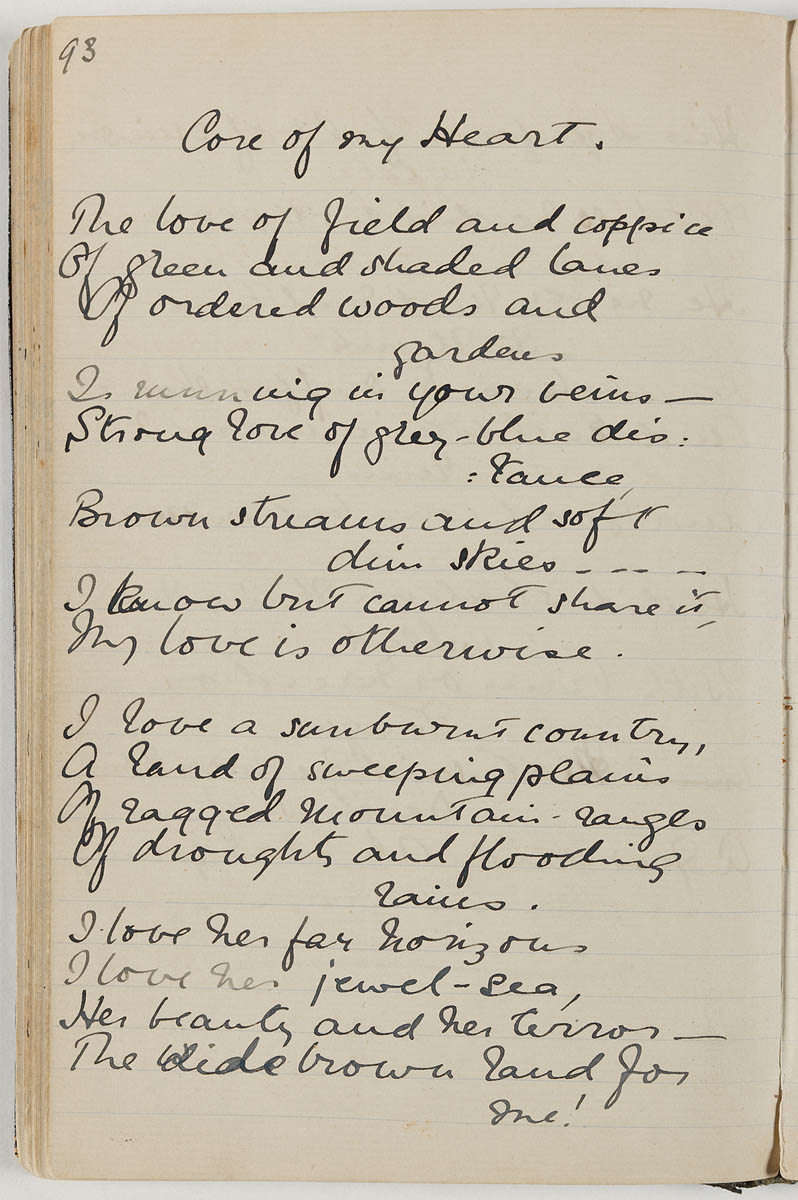
Mackellar's notebook with first two verses

"My Country" is a poem written by Dorothea Mackellar (1885–1968) at the age of 19 about her love of the Australian landscape. After travelling through Europe extensively with her father during her teenage years, she started writing the poem in London in 1904 and re-wrote it several times before her return to Sydney. The poem was first published in The Spectator in London on 5 September 1908 under the title "Core of My Heart". It was reprinted in many Australian newspapers, such as The Sydney Mail & New South Wales Advertiser, who described the poem as a "...clear, ringing, triumphant note of love and trust in [Australia]." The poem quickly became well known and established Mackellar as a poet. The first stanza describes England while the rest of the poem refers to Australia. "My Country" is one of the best-known pieces of Australian poetry and is considered by many Australians to present an overtly romanticised version of "The Australian condition".

Mackellar's family owned substantial properties in the Gunnedah district of New South Wales and a property (Torryburn) in the Paterson district of New South Wales. The poem is believed to have been inspired in part by Mackellar's love of the Allyn River district in NSW.

In an interview in 1967, Mackellar described her reasons for writing the poem.

Not really a special reason. But a friend was speaking to me about England. We had both recently come back from England. And she was talking about Australia and what it didn't have, compared to England. And I began talking about what it did have that England hadn't, that you couldn't expect to know the country to have. 'Cause, of course, there are lots of wonderful things, especially in the older parts, but they're not the same, and, of course, the people who came here first... I'm not blaming them for it. But it was so different to anything they'd known, they didn't understand.

MacKellar's first anthology of poems, The Closed Door and Other Verses, published in Australia in 1911, included the poem. The last line of the third stanza, "And ferns the warm dark soil" was originally "And ferns the crimson soil". Her second anthology, The Witch Maid & Other Verses, published in 1914, included the original version.

A recording of "My Country" made by the radio and TV actor Leonard Teale became so popular in the 1970s that his reading of the first lines of the second stanza were often used to parody him.

== Notes ==
- Mackellar, Dorothea. "Mackellar, Isobel Marion Dorothea (1885–1968)". Australian Dictionary of Biography. National Centre of Biography, Australian National University. ISBN 978-0-522-84459-7. ISSN 1833-7538. OCLC 70677943.
- http://www.dorotheamackellar.com.au
- http://www.sl.nsw.gov.au/discover_collections/people_places/caergwrle/mycountry/index.html
