= John Harris (Australian settler) =

Irish-born surgeon and colonist of New South Wales, Australia

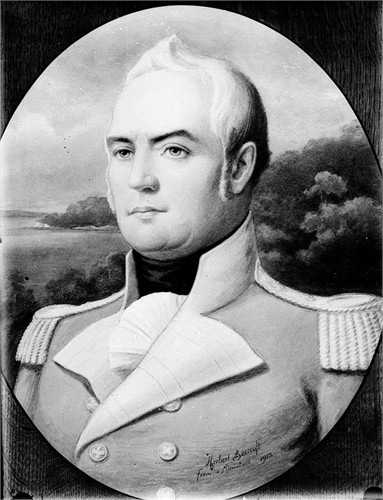
- Born: 1754; Moneymore, Ireland
- Died: April 1838 (aged 83–84); New South Wales, Australia
- Education: University of Edinburgh
- Occupations: Surgeon; Public Servant; Landholder; Magistrate

John Harris (1754 – April 1838) was a military surgeon, naval officer and landowner, who arrived in New South Wales on the Second Fleet and ultimately became one of the major landowners in New South Wales, Australia.

== Early life ==
John Harris, the son of John and Ann Harris, was born in 1754 on the Moy McIlmurry farm in Moneymore, County Londonderry, Ireland. Harris lived a prosperous life, with his family working as tenant farmers on the Salters Company, which received a grant from the Crown in 1611. In Harris’ early schooling years, he was taught Latin, mathematics and classics, however, there was no evidence in any higher education except studying at the University of Edinburgh for a medical profession.

In 1789, an opportunity arose for Harris to join the 102nd army regiment and travel to New South Wales on the Second Fleet and included an instant promotion. Harris agreed to the opportunity and was immediately promoted to surgeon. The Second Fleet was a stressful voyage due to sickness and loss of life and Harris was caught in disputes between officers and masters of Neptune.

== Profession ==
Harris was a surgeon, naval officer and a landowner. Harris studied a medical degree at the University of Edinburgh, Scotland in 1782 and later on became a surgeon in the British Navy in Indian Waters until 1788. In 1789, Harris was appointed as a surgeon with the NSW Corps. Harris was promoted in 1791and was later made magistrate and given responsibility of the police establishment in September 1800.

Up until the 1800, Harris worked as a surgeon and farmer, then becoming an administrative assistant due to his diligence and devotion to his line of work. Harris became the Naval Officer after moving to Sydney in the 1800s and served as a police magistrate for Sydney. In 1801, Harris was ranked up as a Naval Officer, succeeding Surgeon William Balmain.

Harris won the admiration and respect from Governor Philip Gidley King from his participation in the liquor trade and was nominated by the Governor as an administrative assistant. King was the third governor of New South Wales and was in close contact with John Harris and ultimately described Harris as one of the most respectable and intelligent gentleman after his help with the liquor trade and was made the deputy judge advocate.

== Community activity ==
Harris participated in the community in addition to his role as a surgeon. He involved himself in road construction in addition to serving as a naval officer. As a naval officer, Harris communicated with ship masters, implemented port regulations and collected bond. In the 1800s, he became a police magistrate in Sydney and became a target of a force that resented an old elite he represented. Harris was active in the Goal and Orphan Committee and accompanied James Grant in exploring the William's and Paterson Rivers in 1801.

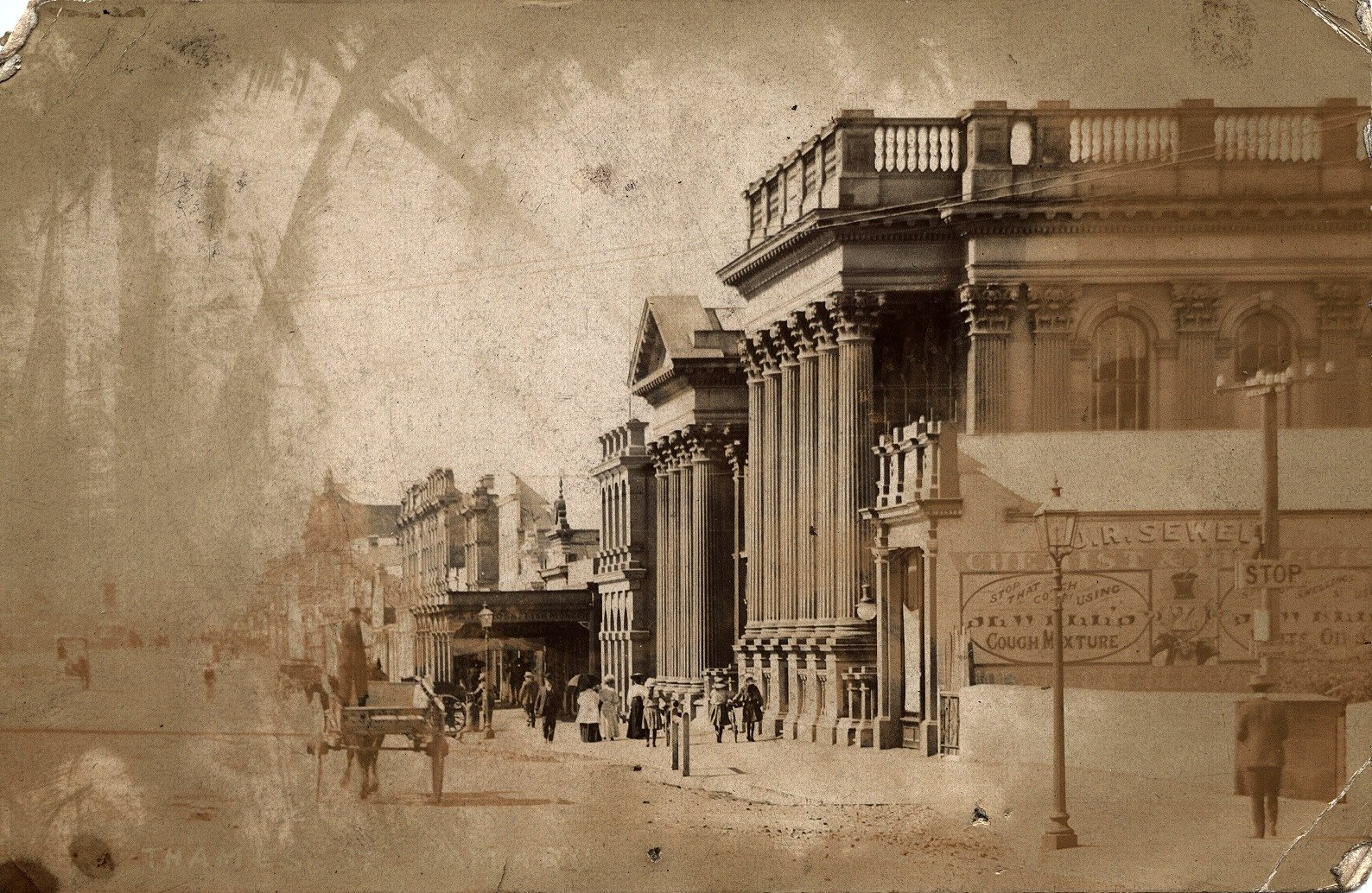
National Bank of New South Wales

Harris also participated in the Gaol and Orphan Committee in addition to exploring the Hunter River with Francis Barrallier, a French explorer in 1801.

In the later months of 1801, Harris accompanied James Grant, a naval officer, Lieutenant Colonel William Paterson and artist John Lewin to further investigate the Hunter River and Port Steven's in Lady Nelson. Harris was additionally involved in establishing the Bank of New South Wales and was elected as one of the first directors in February 1817.

Harris community activities, specifically helping with the liquor trade won the admiration and respect from Governor Philip Gidley King and was employed as a deputy judge advocate in courts martial.

== Late life ==
Harris arrived in New South Wales as a surgeon's mate on Surprize, one of the six ships arriving as a part of the second fleet in 1790. During his time in New South Wales, he played a very active role in his community by growing in his profession and purchasing land.

Due to the extent of the number of civil responsibilities Harris held, he became involved with traders and officers and was asked by Lieutenant Colonel William Patterson to be relieved of his duties that conflicted with his military duties. Harris actions as a naval officer included reporting private conversations from Governor King about his dissatisfaction of the military and this led to Harris being charged with ungentlemanlike conduct and he faced an additional court martial six months later for supposedly disclosing voting actions. Harris was acquitted in both occasions and was debarred from the civil office and was not up until 1804 that Harris was reinstated as a naval officer and was later re-sworn as a magistrate and supervisor of the police force.

In 1807, Harris was dismissed as a naval officer and from the bench by Governor William Bligh which lead to Harris becoming a bitter opponent of Bligh, portraying him as "avaricious, dishonest and tyrannical". Bligh was later espoused in the Rum Rebellion. However, Major George Johnston reinstated Harris as a magistrate in January 1808, however Johnston was quick to lose favour in Harris from his criticism of John Macarthur, a pioneer of the wool industry. Johnston dismissed Harris again in April 1808 and Harris was ordered to London to deliver the rebel case against the British government, however, Harris pleaded sick and in January 1809, he was appointed once again as a magistrate. Harris left for England and Ireland in April 1809 for two years and returned accompanied by his new wife, 25-year-old Eliza Jones, having married at the Covent Gardens.

In 1814, Harris resigned and returned to Port Jackson with Eliza and became a private settler. Harris kept his properties in control and devoted the final years of his life to farming and stock raising while actively being involved in public affairs and served in many committees, including supporting the establishment of the Bank of New South Wales and became one of the first directors. In 1819, he participated on John Oxley's Bathurst expedition as a surgeon. Within the same year of participating in Oxley's expedition, he was once again elected as a magistrate.

In 1830s, Harris developed a hip problem which confined him to a wheelchair and he dropped out of community activities and began managing his pastoral and agricultural holdings and worked until his death on 27 April 1838.

== Landholdings ==
In April 1793, John Harris was granted 100 acres (40 hectares) located in Parramatta and later bought a farm from James Ruse, a freed convict to build what is now known as the Experiment Farm Cottage. In 1804, Harris expanded his developments and built himself a two-storey residence, known as the Ultimo House that consisted of 233 acres by 1818 with the assistance of architect Francis Greenway. By the end of a century, Harris owned 315 and 205 acres (127 and 83 hectares) were purchased himself. Harris had acquired more than 431 number of stock, placing him within the foremost officer farmers.

Harris’ close relation with Governor King granted him a new house on a 34-acre land in Ultimo-Pyrmont Peninsula and three grants making him the landowner of almost the entire area of Ultimo and Pyrmont. This enabled him to build his estate which he further developed and expanded throughout many years.

=== Ultimo House ===
The Ultimo House was built for Harris in 1804, a two-storey residence overlooking Blackwattle Creek and Cockle Bay. The Ultimo House became the oldest standing house in Sydney in 1932 and was used by Harris for small scale farming, however, it was predominantly for show, rather than production purposes. The Ultimo House was treated by Harris as a country seat by transforming its landscape into an English-style parkland with imported Indian deer.

In 1835, Harris purchased a land which he built his bungalow, the Experiment Farm Cottage in Harris Park with the purpose of proving that a new settler could easily provide for its family with very little assistance; the building still stands to this day.

In 1808, Harris organised a dinner at the Ultimo House with officers who were opposed to Governor William Bligh. This dinner party hosted by Harris was the dinner that attracted conspirators to return to Sydney to arrest Bligh in what was to be known as the Rum Rebellion.

Harris returned to his Ultimo House with his new wife Eliza Jones and commissioned Francis Greenway, an architect who arrived at New South Wales as a convict in 1814 on General Hewitt.

Harris lived in the Ultimo House until 1821, which he then leased the property to Edward Riley, an Australian politician, in 1821–1824, followed by Judge John Steven and John Edye Manning, a registrar of the Supreme Court of New South Wales. Before the demolition of the Ultimo House in 1932, it was located on a 34-acre land that was given by the Governor Philip Gidley King in 1803.

Although this house was used as residence, during the mid-1850s, it was employed by the Australian Washing Association for laundry.

It was once again leased to James Wallach, a wool broker in 1858 before being occupied by the members of the Harris family, first occupying the Ultimo House by Mary Ann Harris, then George Harris, John Harris' nephew. By late 1890s, the estate was subdivided, leaving three acres behind. George Harris renovated the Ultimo House prior to a fire in the 1870s by adding three additional turreted towers.

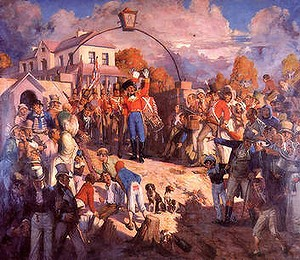
Rum Rebellion

==== Rum Rebellion ====
The overthrow of Governor William Bligh became known as the Rum Rebellion as the NSW Corps was heavily involved in the trade of rum. The Rum Rebellion was an act to depose Governor William Bligh by local critics. Before Harris attracted conspirators to arrest Bligh, Bligh accused the corps of corruption and ineptitude and the act that led to the rebellion was Bligh's arrest of John Macarthur, who was a former corps officer and leading entrepreneur. The Rum Rebellion was considered significant as it was the only time in Australian history that the Australian Government was overthrown by the military.

==== The Australian Washing Association ====
The Australian Washing Association utilised the Ultimo House as its Sydney laundry washing location. It was advertised that their washing house at Ultimo House was fitted with both hot and cold water, with articles notifying the public their service of washing from Monday to Wednesday and delivering clean fresh clothes back on Thursday to Saturday.

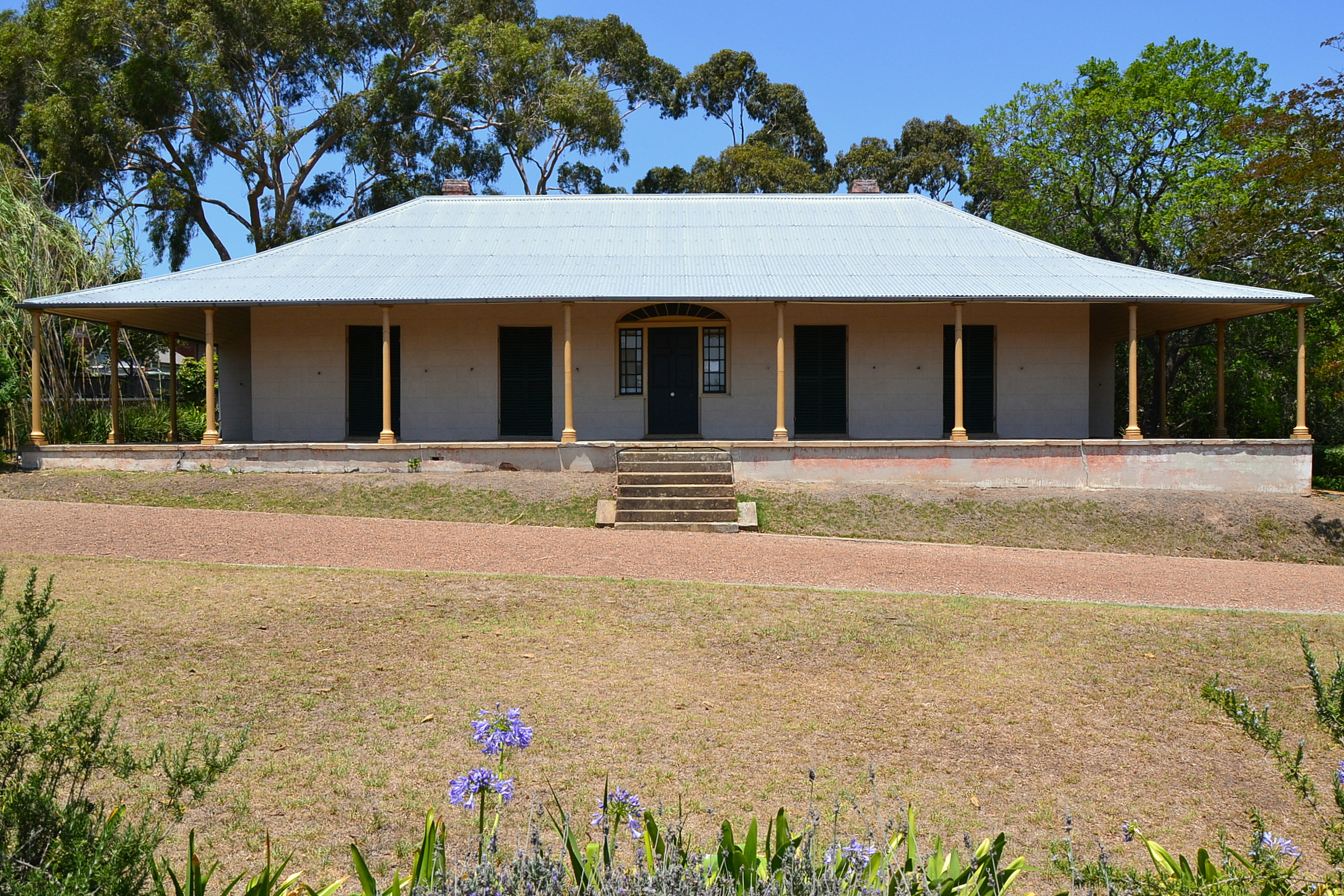
Experiment Farm Cottage

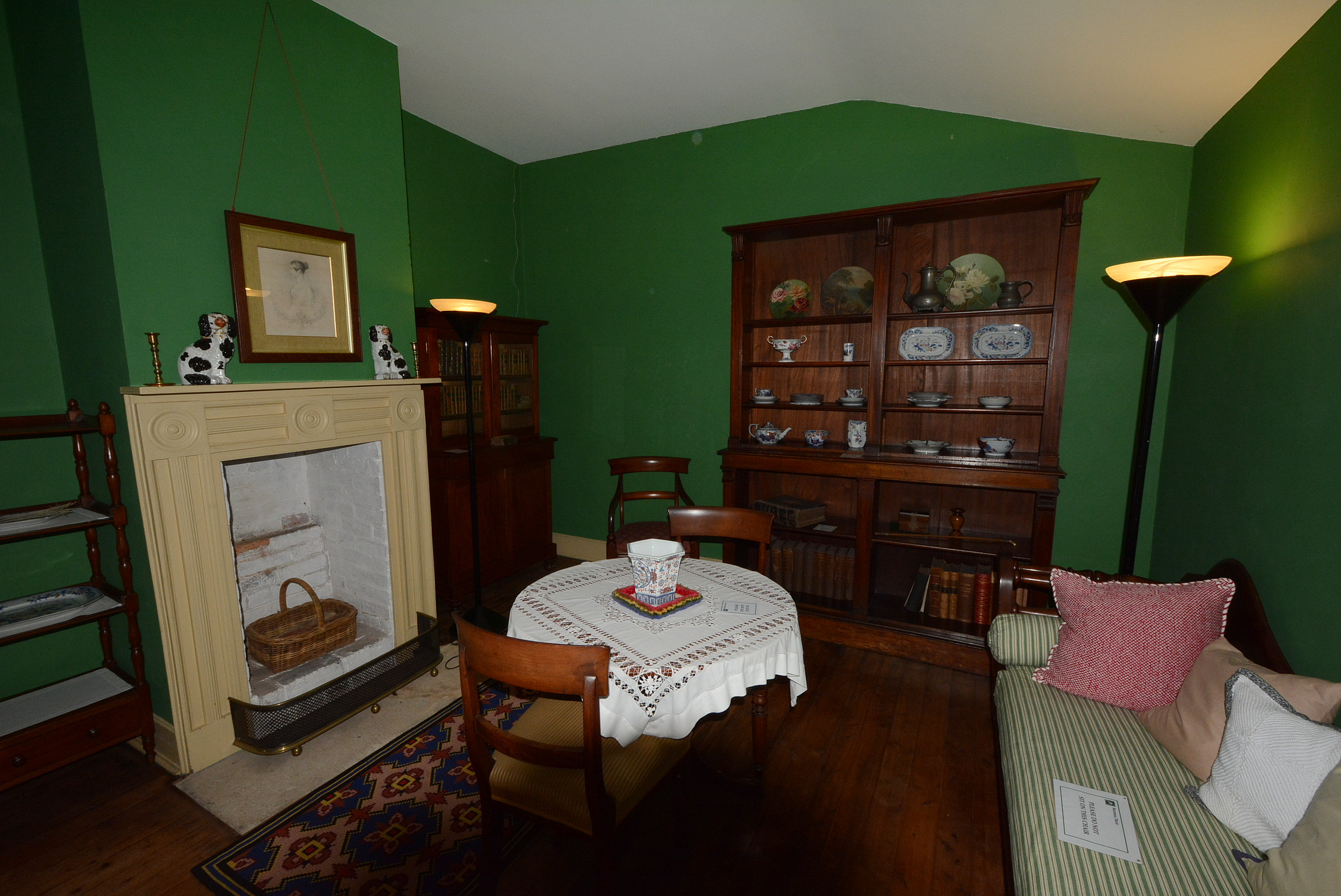
Experiment Farm Cottage

=== Experiment Farm Cottage ===
The Experiment Farm Cottage is located at 9 Ruse Street, Harris Park, NSW 2150, county of Cumberland. Harris was granted 100 acres in Parramatta and purchased an additional farm from James Ruse, a freed convict in 1798 and this land became the home of the Experiment Farm Cottage. The Experiment Farm Cottage was built by Harris in c1835 to mimic an Indian style Bungalow that shows a new settler such as himself could start a life and family with minimal assistance. The Experiment Farm Cottage remained in the Harris family until 1923 and was then subdivided and sold.

The Experiment Farm Cottage has a symmetrical front with a low hipped roof covering its verandah with a 6 panelled entrance door and sidelights surrounding the exterior. The cottage sits on a small garden filled with lemon scented gum (Corymbia citriodora), jacaranda's (Jacaranda mimosifolia), fruit trees and cottage plants.

John Harris owned a total of 315 acres of land, and acquired 431 number of stock and possessions. Harris became the property owner of the Shane's Park estate, Experiment Farm, Ultimo Farm, Ultimo House and Ultimo Estate.

The Experiment Farm Cottage has been furnished by the National Trust of Australia in the early 200s to reflect Harris' home with the use of evidence from old paintings, sketches and photographs to create the best representation of the cottage. The Experiment Farm Cottage has become one of Australia's oldest properties and features a sketch and watercolour by British artist, Conrad Martens.

== Legacy ==
John Harris died on 27 April 1838, leaving approximately £150,000 worth of property. In Harris’ will, it was stated his estate to be inherited by his Irish relatives while his Parramatta farm was to be left to his brother William Harris’ son, Thomas Harris. This property later became the Sydney Technical College and was demolished in 1932. Thomas Harris inherited the Experiment Farm in 1838 and began farming and breeding horses before dying in 1870.

=== Experiment Farm Cottage ===
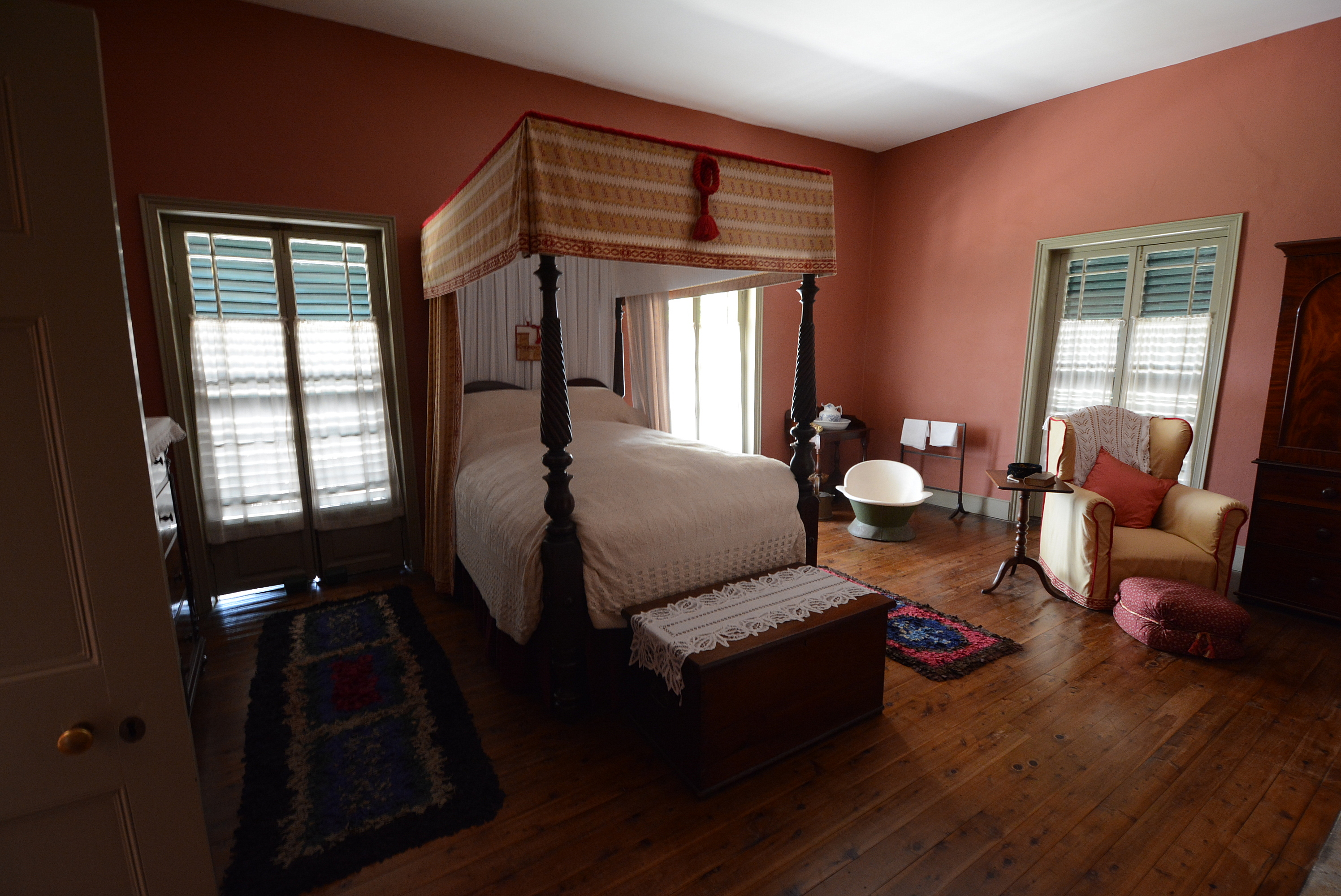
Furnished Experiment Farm Cottage Interior

In recognition of his devotion and time to communities of New South Wales, Harris was ultimately given the Ultimo Estate while his property Experiment Farm Cottage is kept as a part of New South Wales historical precinct which allowed members of the community to access the site for leisure and educational purposes. This precinct also includes the Hambledon Cottage, Elizabeth Farm and the Queen's Wharf. The Experiment Farm Cottage is now a museum located in Harris Park for the community to explore and embrace stories of past settlers.

Harris resided at the Experiment Farm Cottage until his death in 1836 and the property was left with his family until 1921 which the land was divided and Harris Park was established. In 1961, the land was the first land that was acquired by the National Trust of Australia (NSW) and was restored and furnished with colonial pieces and became open to the public. It also became the first house museum that focused on Australian colonial furnitures.

The Experiment Farm Cottage is now refurnished with paintings, catalogues and photographs to reflect Harris home with an addition of colonial furnitures.

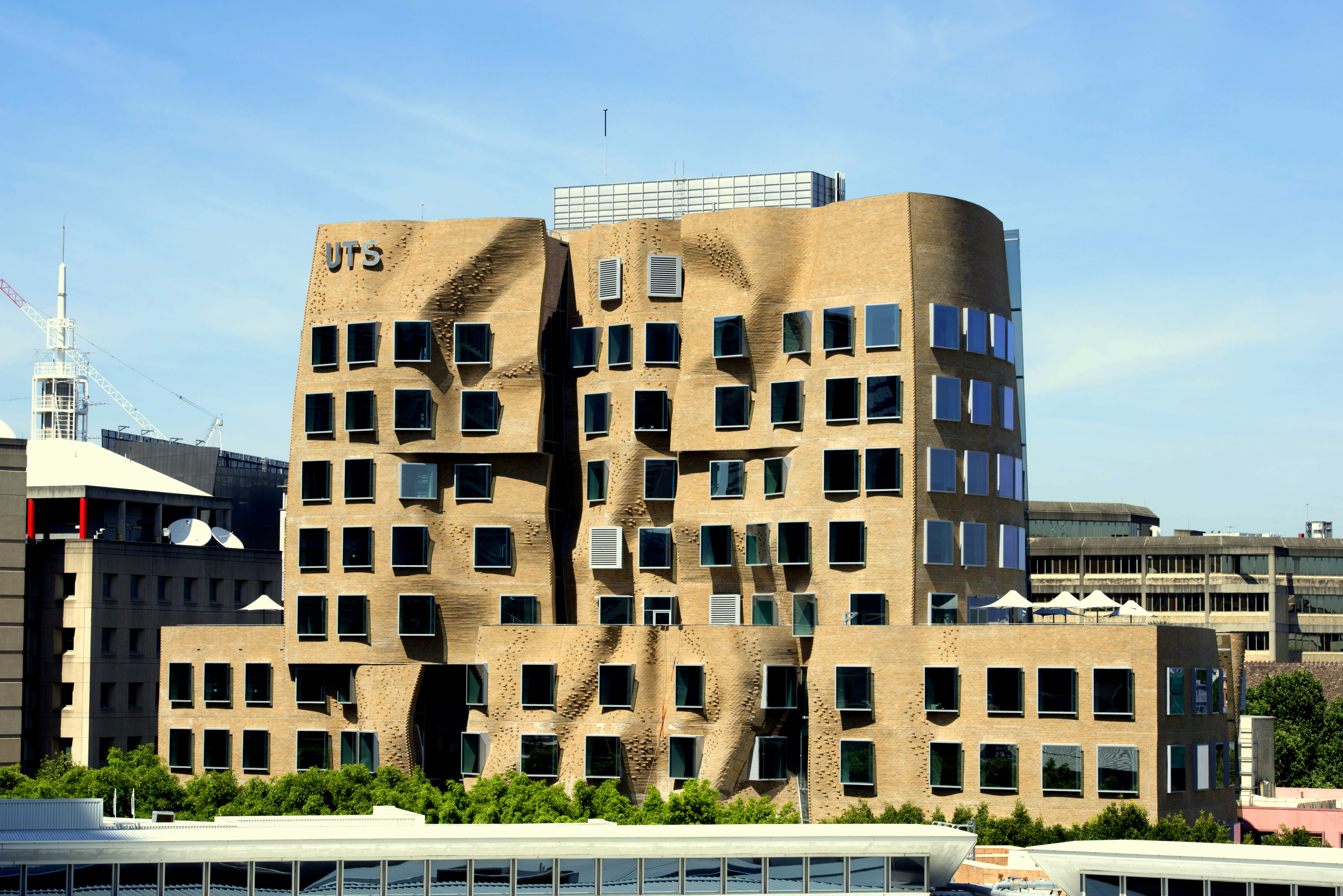
University of Technology Sydney

=== Ultimo ===
Ultimo was named after Harris’, which the land is now occupied by the University of Technology Sydney in addition to Harris Park, a suburb in Greater Western Sydney and Mount Harris in New South Wales.

==== Ultimo House ====
The Ultimo House was pressured by the Board of Technical Education to be opened to public in 1883 after Harris death. It was suggested that the Board of Technical Education to purchase 3.5 acres of Harris' land to develop and build a new Technical College. However, this was initially rejected by Joseph Currathers, the Minister of Public Instruction, though, the land was still purchased in 1891 and two high schools, a technical college and a technical museum was built.

By 1910, the technical college expanded twice its size, occupying the entire block, including the Ultimo House and an additional two acres of garden. This site was used by students as a lunch and recreational area and the Ultimo House itself was used as a classroom to teach dressmaking, millinery, flower making, veterinary science and agriculture. However, the stables ad coach house were demolished and transformed into classrooms teaching bricklaying, plastering, masonry, drawing and design. The transformation of the Utimo House was supervised by James Nangle, the head of an architect department.

However, by November 1932, the Ultimo House was demolished once again for the expansion of the Technical College, a new electrical engineering building.
