= Harris Park =

Suburb of Sydney, Australia

- Suburb
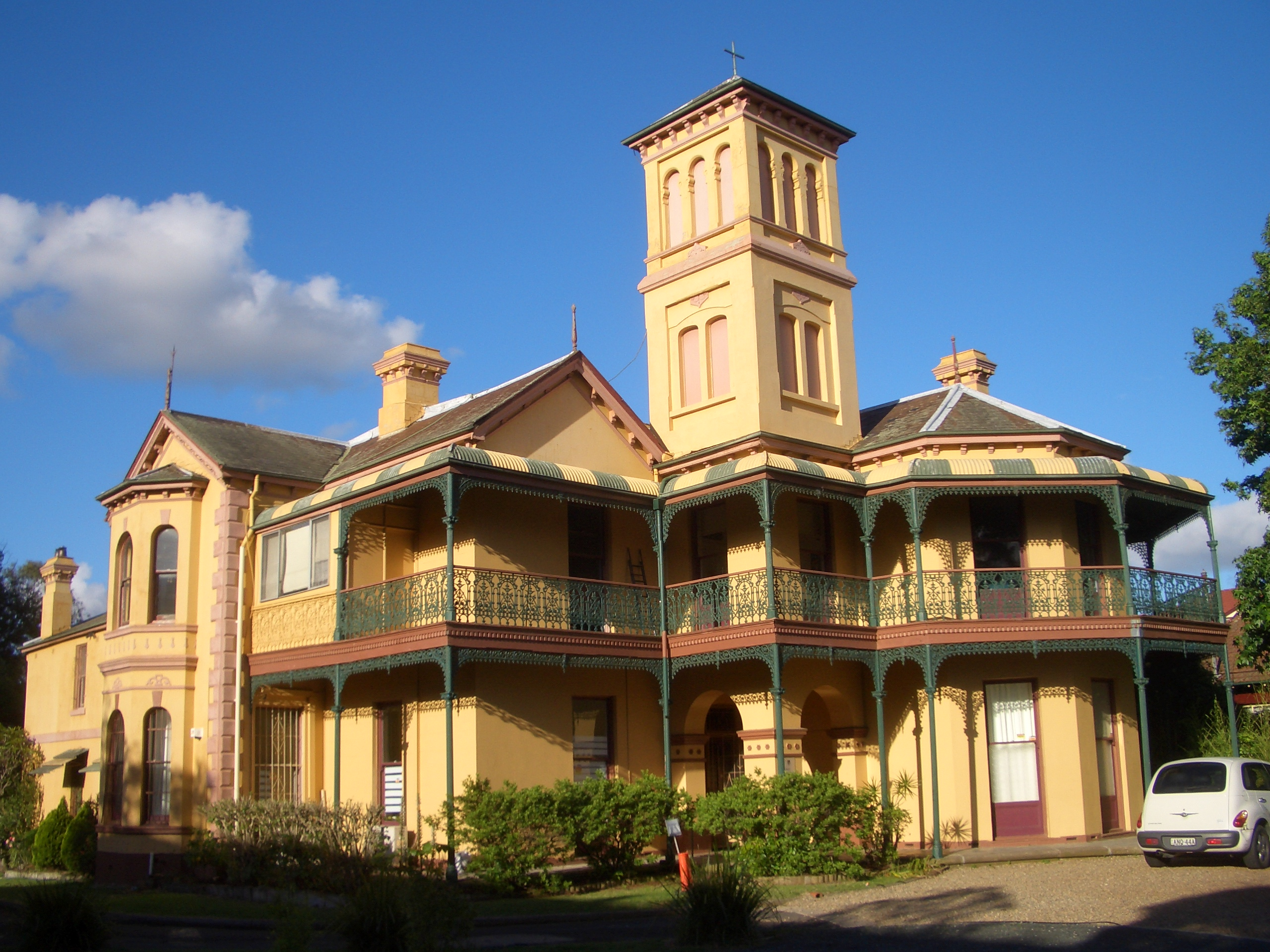
- Kenilworth, Holy Spirit Seminary, Diocese of Parramatta

- Interactive map of Harris Park
- Country: Australia
- State: New South Wales
- City: Greater Western Sydney
- LGA: City of Parramatta
- Location: 19 km (12 mi) west of Sydney CBD
- Established: 1791

Government
  - State electorate: Parramatta
  - Federal division: Parramatta

Area
  - Total: 0.64 km^{2} (0.25 sq mi)
- Elevation: 20 m (66 ft)

Population
  - Total: 5,043 (2021 census)
  - Density: 7,880/km^{2} (20,410/sq mi)
- Postcode: 2150
Suburbs around Harris Park
Westmead	Parramatta	Camellia
Parramatta	Harris Park	Rosehill
Holroyd	Granville	Clyde

Harris Park is a suburb of Greater Western Sydney, in the state of New South Wales, Australia. Harris Park is located 19 kilometres west of the Sydney central business district in the local government area of the City of Parramatta and is part of the Greater Western Sydney region. Harris Park has a sizeable Indian and Hindu diaspora, which together make up the largest ethnic and religious grouping in the suburb. As a result, a precinct in the suburb is informally sometimes referred to as Little India.

Harris Park is the home of several historic sites, including Experiment Farm.

== History ==
James Ruse was the first convict to be granted land in the colony, by Governor Arthur Phillip in this area in 1791. He developed Australia's first private farm, known as Experiment Farm, which sowed the first wheat in Australia. Surgeon John Harris, who had already received land grants in the area in 1793 and 1805, bought the farm and built a cottage on the site in c1795. Harris Park is named after John Harris. The cottage is heritage-listed and open to the public.

John Macarthur built Elizabeth Farm in 1793. The building changed and grew substantially over the years, and the architect John Verge is thought to have worked on it from around the late 1820s to the late 1830s. It now falls within the Rosehill area and is heritage-listed.

Macarthur built Hambledon Cottage in the early 1820s for Penelope Lucas, the governess for his children. The main wing was designed by Henry Kitchen and the house was used for vice-regal guests until 1883. It is heritage-listed. Penelope Lucas is now remembered in Penelope Lucas Lane, in Rosehill.

In the 1880s, Arthur Latimer McCredie, an architect and alderman in Parramatta Council, built his mansion, Kenilworth, in Allen Street. It was a two-storey building in Victorian Italianate style and served as his home for most of the remainder of his life. Though his will expressly forbade the property being conveyed to Catholics, it was acquired on his death by the Sisters of Mercy, who ran it as the Convent of Mercy from 1927 to 1998. It then became the Australian International Performing Arts High School. In 2013 it was converted into the new home of Holy Spirit Seminary, the seminary of the Catholic Diocese of Parramatta. Kenilworth is heritage-listed.

== Heritage listings ==
Harris Park has a number of heritage-listed sites, including:

- 47 Hassall Street: Hambledon Cottage
- Robin Thomas Reserve: Parramatta Sand Body Conservation Area and Military Barracks Site
- 9 Ruse Street: Experiment Farm Cottage

== Commercial area and transport ==
Harris Park has a small shopping area around Marion Street. It is very close to the major commercial centre of Parramatta. Harris Park railway station is on the Main Western railway line.

On 23 May 2023, prime minister Anthony Albanese announced at a special community event for the Indian diaspora, during Narendra Modi's state visit to Sydney, that a small precinct in the suburb's commercial area would be renamed "Little India" following requests from the local community.

== Churches ==
- Our Lady of Lebanon Maronite Church was officially opened and blessed by Archbishop Abdo Khalifé on 6 August 1978; it was elevated to the status of co-cathedral on 11 October 2014. The school was opened on 10 December 1972.
- St Ioannis Greek Orthodox Church, located on Hassall Street, is one of the parishes of the Greek Orthodox Archdiocese of Australia.
- Holy Spirit Seminary, the seminary of the Catholic Diocese of Parramatta, was moved from its former site in St Marys to Harris Park's historic house Kenilworth in 2013. It was opened and blessed by Most Rev Bishop Anthony Fisher, OP the 3rd bishop of Parramatta (2010–2014) on Trinity Sunday, 26 May 2013. Next door is the church of St Oliver Plunkett and St Oliver's Primary School. The rector of the seminary is Very Rev Fr John Hogan and the vice-rector is Very Rev Fr Christopher de Souza VG EV PP who is also a vicar-general and the parish priest at the St Oliver Plunkett Parish.

== Population ==
In the 2021 census there were 5,043 residents in Harris Park. 54.2% were males and 45.8% were females. Only 19.1% of people were born in Australia. The top other countries of birth were India 45.4%, Nepal 5.9%, China 4.2%, Lebanon 2.8% and Philippines 2.3%. The most commonly reported ancestries were Indian 34.9%, English 8.4%, Chinese 7.6%, Nepalese 5.8% and Australian 5.8%. 18.0% of people spoke only English at home. Other languages spoken at home included Gujarati 15.1%, Hindi 11.6%, Punjabi 6.4%, Nepali 5.7% and Telugu 5.6%. The top responses for religious affiliation were Hinduism 46.9%, Catholic 12.7%, no religion 10.9% and Islam 6.1%.

In the 2016 census there were 5,799 residents in Harris Park. 53.6% were males and 46.4% were females. Only 18.9% of people were born in Australia. The top other countries of birth were India 46.4%, China 5.1%, Lebanon 2.9%, Philippines 1.9% and Afghanistan 1.2%. The most common reported ancestries were Indian 39.4%, English 7.2%, Chinese 6.7%, Australian 5.6% and Lebanese 4.5%. 15.4% of people spoke only English at home. Other languages spoken at home included Gujarati 18.7%, Hindi 11.7%, Punjabi 5.9%, Arabic 5.1% and Telugu 4.8%. The top responses for religious affiliation were Hinduism 44.8%, Catholic 12.2%, no religion 9.7% and Islam 6.5%.

In the 2011 census there were 5,072 residents in Harris Park. 53.6% were males and 46.4% were females. Only 21.8% of people were born in Australia. The top other countries of birth were India 39.9%, China 4.7%, Lebanon 3.3%, Afghanistan 2.3% and Philippines 2.2%. The most common reported ancestries were Indian 34.1%, English 7.7%, Chinese 6.7%, Australian 5.6% and Lebanese 5.3%. The majority of people spoke a language other than English at home, with the most common languages spoken being Gujarati 20.4%, Hindi 8.3%, Punjabi 6.5%, Arabic 6.3% and Mandarin 3.3%. The top responses for religious affiliation were Hinduism 37.0%, Catholic 15.1%, Islam 9.9% and no religion 8.6%.

== Gallery ==
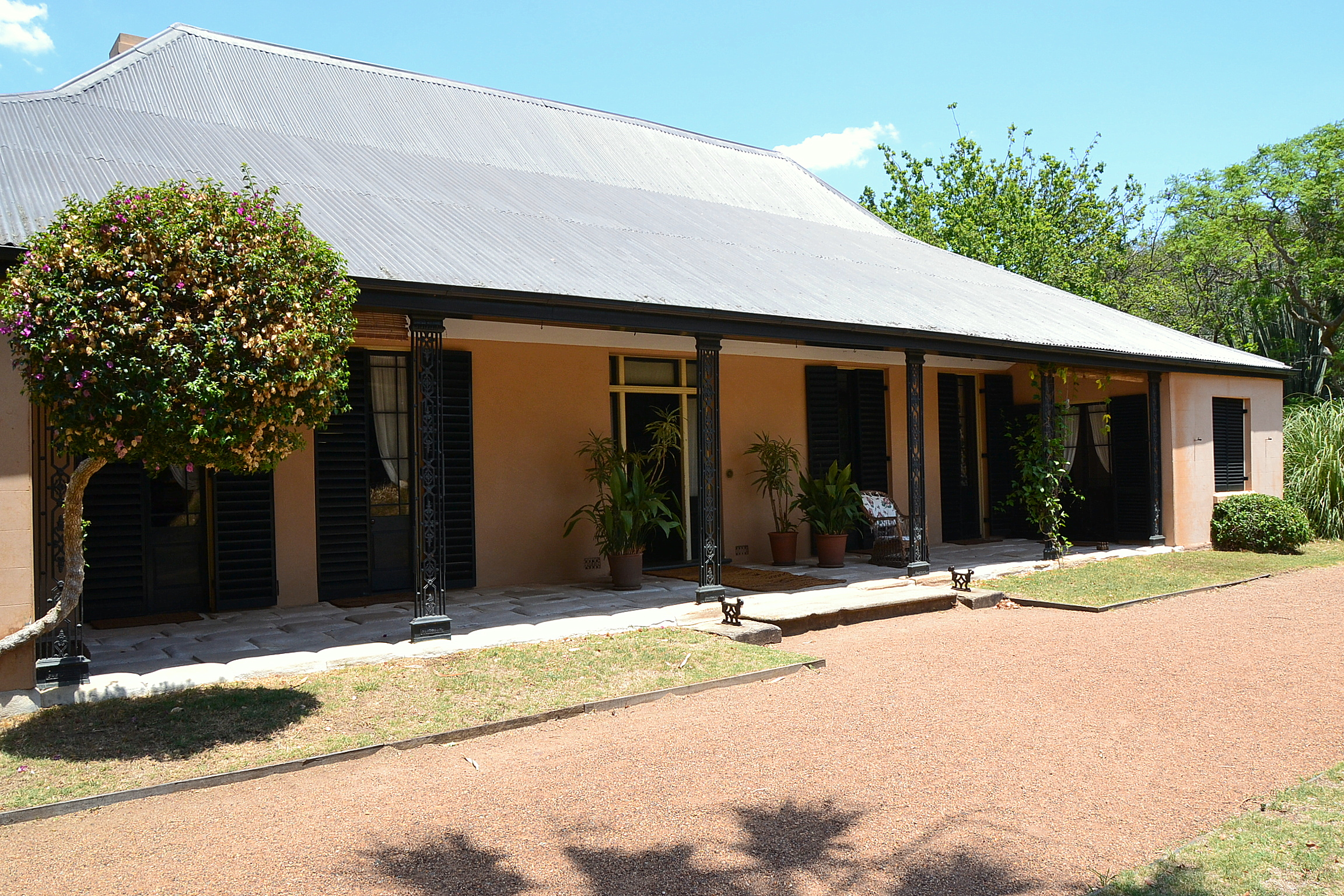
Elizabeth Farm

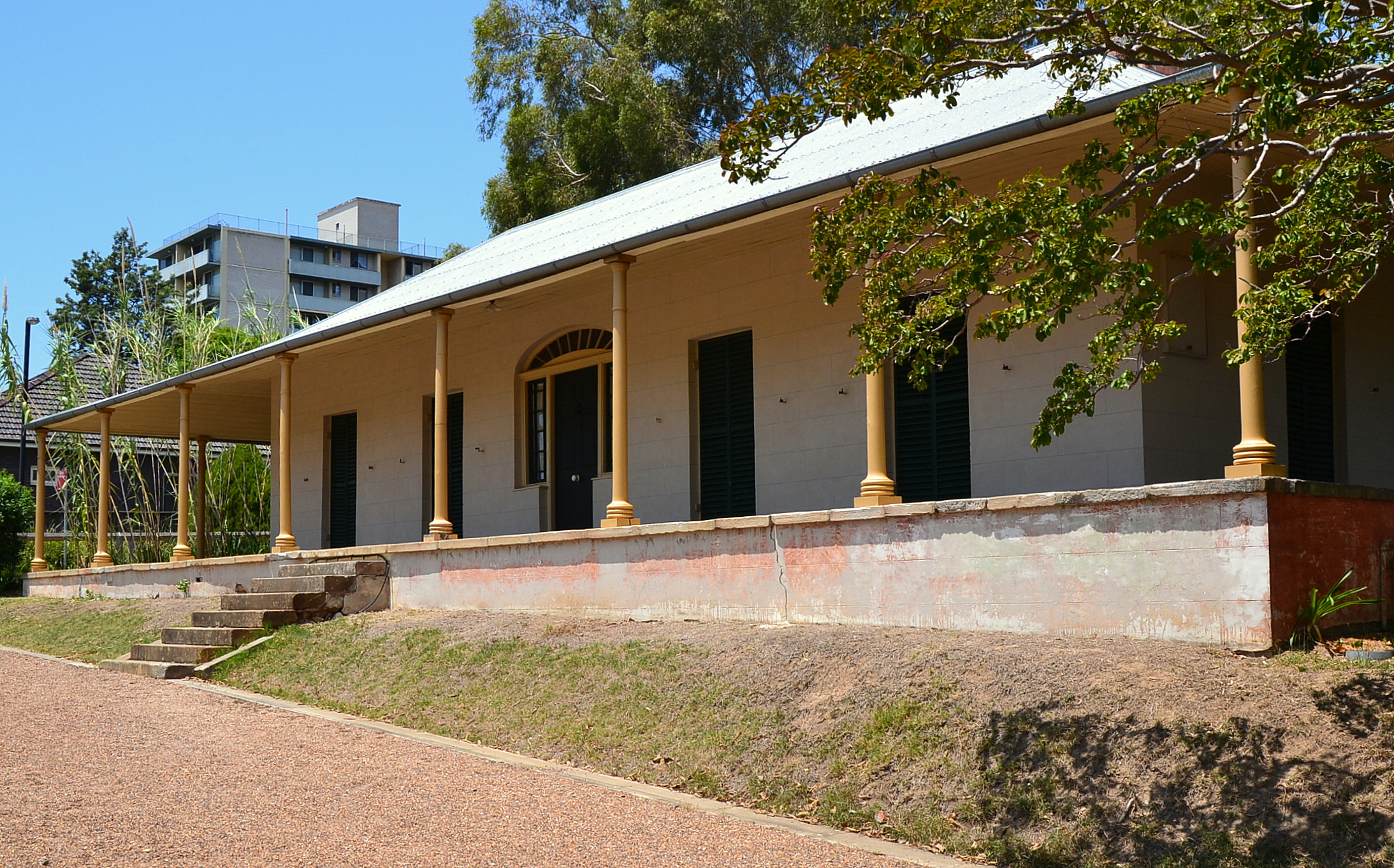
Experiment Farm Cottage

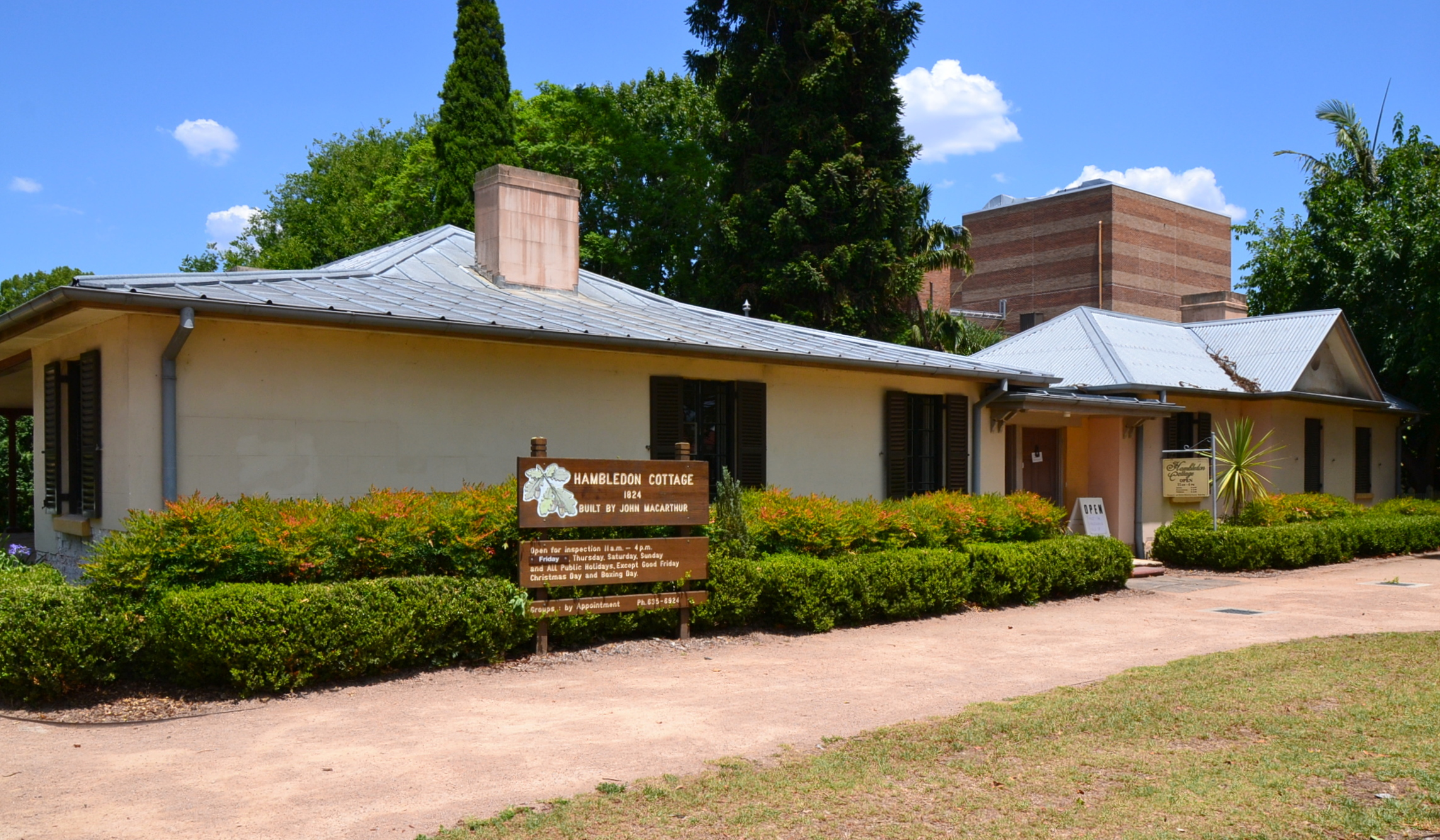
Hambledon Cottage

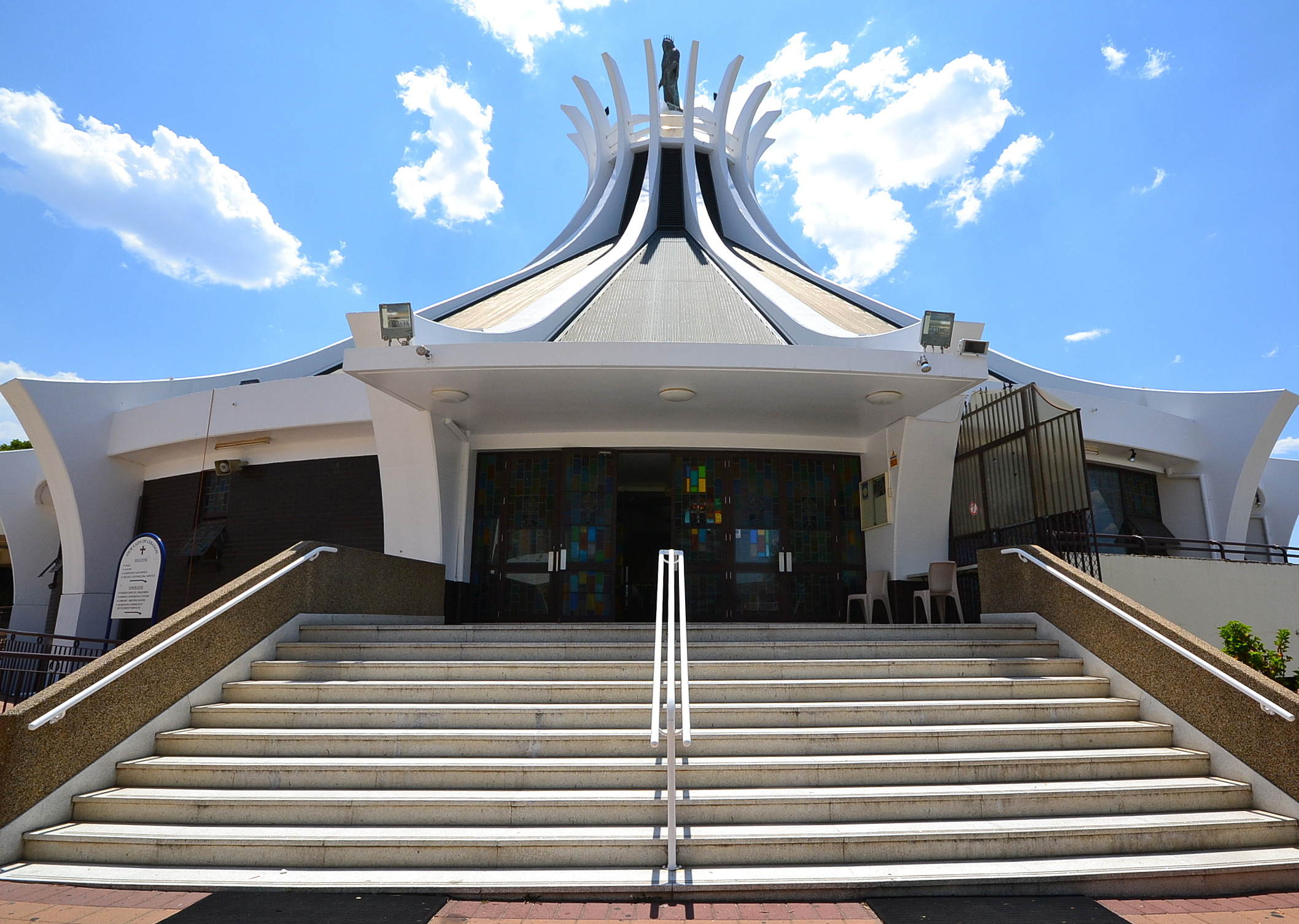
Our Lady of Lebanon Church

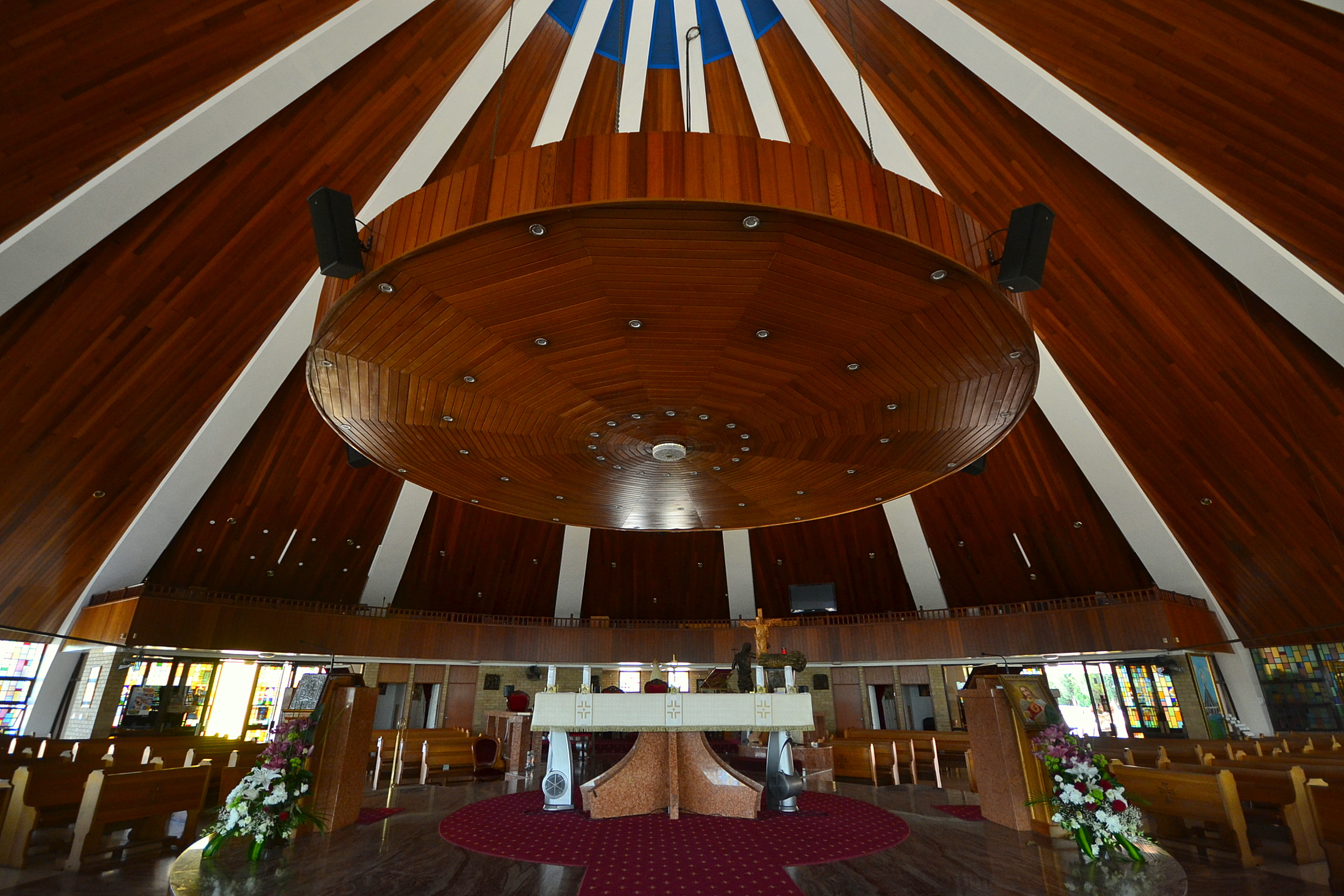
Our Lady of Lebanon Church interior

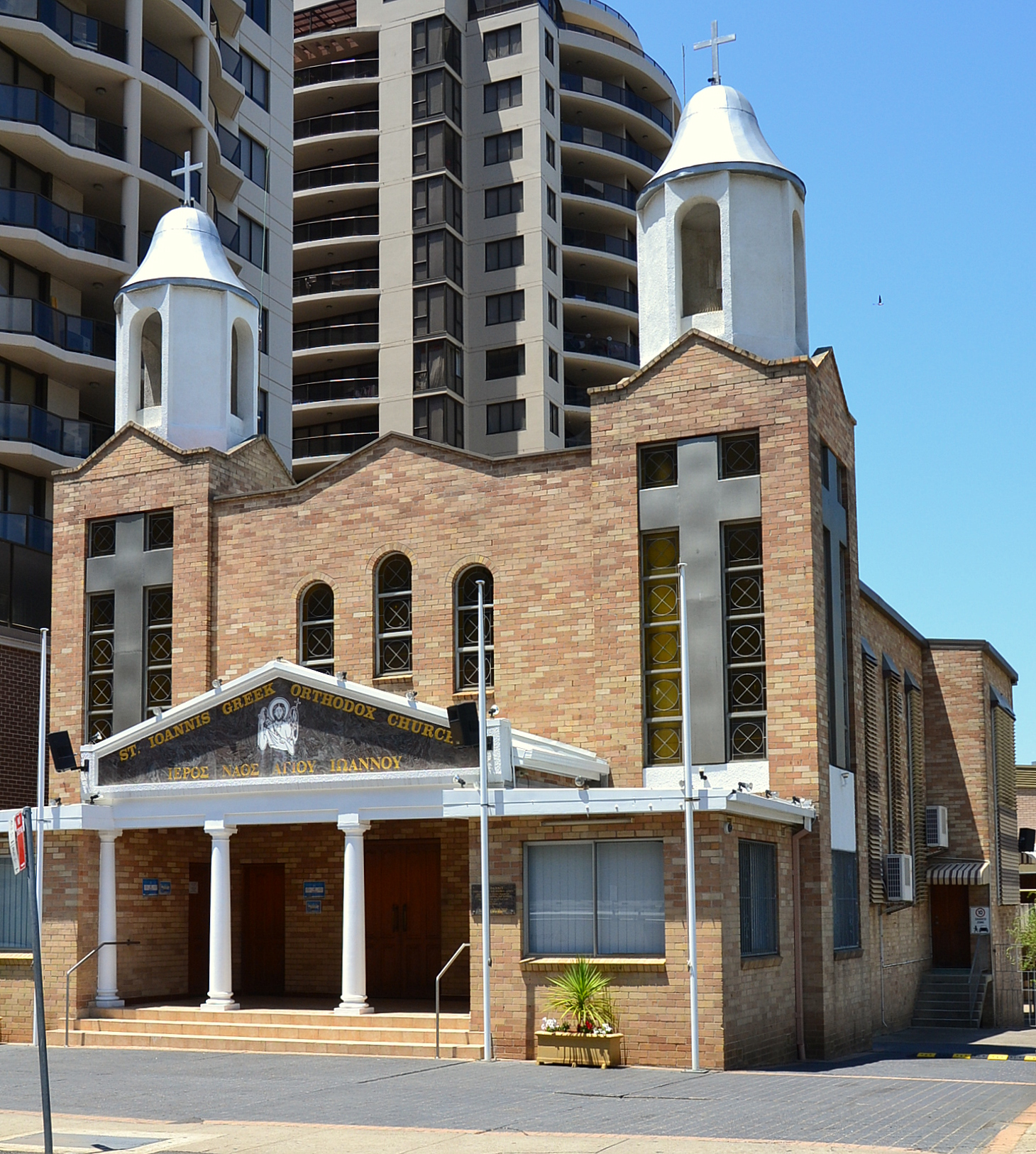
St Ioannis Greek Orthodox Church
