= Parramatta Sand Body Conservation Area and Military Barracks Site =

- Location within Sydney Location within Australia
- 33.8170°S 151.0124°E
- Location: Robin Thomas Reserve, Harris Park, City of Parramatta, Sydney New South Wales, Australia

New South Wales Heritage Register
- Official name: Ancient Aboriginal and Early Colonial Landscape; Parramatta Sand Body /Terrace/ Sheet; 137; 139; 143; 143a; 145; and 147 George St; 115 and 109 Harris St; Harris Park; Robin Thomas Reserve
- Type: state heritage (archaeological-terrestrial)
- Designated: 8 July 2011
- Reference no.: 1863
- Type: Occupational site
- Category: Aboriginal

Parramatta Sand Body Conservation Area and Military Barracks Site is a heritage-listed archaeological site relating to both Aboriginal and European occupation at George and Harris Streets, Harris Park, City of Parramatta, Sydney, New South Wales, Australia. It was added to the New South Wales State Heritage Register on 8 July 2011.

== History ==
=== Parramatta Sand Body ===
The Parramatta Sand Body is a previously unrecognised soil landscape unit that runs along the Parramatta River through the Parramatta CBD. The precise origin of the Parramatta sand body is not known, but it is thought that the fluvial sand was deposited by the Parramatta River during periods of flooding. The main body of the sand forms a levee along the south bank of the river. The well-developed profile of the sand, suggests that the sand is of late Pleistocene age. The deeper layers of sand may have been deposited as much as 120,000 years ago and may relate to a period of a higher sea level.

The original vegetation on the sand body was probably paperbark trees and grassland with well-spaced gum, grey box and rough-barked apple trees on slightly higher ground. Banksia and grass trees were likely to have been present and a sparse scattering of mangroves may have been present along the river. Swamps and waterholes punctuated the sand terrace.

The sand body has been the subject of archaeological investigation, and a substantial archival record of pre-colonial Aboriginal occupation of the Parramatta CBD has been recovered from the fluvial sand terrace. Analysis of this record has the potential to yield new and important information about the diet and lifestyle of Aboriginal people living in Parramatta, in pre-colonial times.

==== Occupation of Parramatta by the Aboriginal People ====
Aboriginal peoples have occupied the Parramatta region for tens of thousands of years. Evidence of their occupation can be found in the form of rock shelters with deposits, open campsites, middens, axe grinding groove sites, scarred trees, hand stencils and drawings. In pre-colonial times, Parramatta would have been very attractive to Aboriginal people as the landscape would have supported a wide variety of plant and animal life. The City of Parramatta is located on Parramatta River at what is effectively the head of Sydney Harbour. Permanent fresh water was available in the river upstream of the tidal limit and fresh water would also have been available from creeks and surface waterholes, in more clayey parts of the sand terrace. Aboriginal people living in this location would have had access to freshwater and saltwater food resources such as: ducks, eels, shellfish, crayfish, fish and turtles. Terrestrial resources in the Parramatta area included woodland and grassland mammals such as: kangaroos, possums and flying foxes. The grassy woodlands would also have provided access to smaller animals and insects and to native fruits, berries, seeds, yams and roots.

Parramatta CBD, at the time of European settlement, is thought to have been the territorial lands of the Boromedegal (also spelt Burramattgal, Boora me di-gal, Booramedegal and Burramedigal). The Boromedegal appear to have belonged to a larger cultural group that extended across western Sydney, although exact language group affiliations of pre-contact groups in the Parramatta region is open to some debate. Much European knowledge about the traditional life style of Aboriginal people living in the Parramatta CBD area is reliant on archaeological investigation, as the Boromedegal People (as a distinct population group) disappeared very soon after European settlement of the area.

European settlers, attracted to Parramatta for its fertile soils and its suitability for water transport, began arriving in the region in the late 18th century. Parramatta quickly became the focus of residential, commercial and industrial development. The establishment of the town of Parramatta and cultivation of the surrounding land, would have resulted in many Aboriginal sites being disturbed or destroyed without being recorded. To date only a relatively few Aboriginal sites have been recorded in the Parramatta local government area.

==== Identification of the Parramatta Sand Body ====
The Parramatta sand body was first identified as a soil landscape unit in 2002 as result of archaeological investigation of the Meriton Building site located at 180-180a George Street and 30-32 Charles Street, Parramatta. Archaeological investigation of this site and subsequent archaeological investigations of other sites in the Parramatta CBD, have shown that the fluvial sand body contains significant evidence of pre-colonial Aboriginal occupation along the Parramatta River through the CBD.

The archaeological salvage excavation undertaken by Jo McDonald Cultural Heritage Management Pty Ltd at the Meriton Building site, identified extensive archaeological evidence of Aboriginal occupation stretching over many thousands of years. Several discrete activity sites, including a knapping floor (a site where stone tools were manufactured), were excavated. More than 6,500 lithic (stone) artefacts were recovered from this site. Amongst the artefacts recovered were a number of quite rare items including: hatchets heads (axes), hammerstones, anvils, grindstone fragments, cobble chopping tools and a perforated shark's tooth (probably a hair ornament or pendant).

Multiple phases of prehistoric occupation of the site were indicated by lithic assemblages (stone artefacts) found in two distinct layers within the sand body. The lithic assemblages differ in terms of raw materials and tool types. The upper assemblage (more recent in age) features backed artefacts and the preferred raw material was silicrete, whereas the lower assemblage was dominated by silicified tuff and it included rare dentate tools. Analysis of the artefacts and radiocarbon dating has indicated that the upper assemblage probably dates to the last 2,000 years, while the lower assemblage dates to between 10,000 and 30,000 years BP (before present). The lithic assemblages recovered from this site are of particular scientific significance as stratified cultural deposits, which show change over time, are uncommon in open excavation sites in the Sydney area.

Since 2002, the sand body has been the subject of ongoing development pressure which has resulted further archaeological investigation. An archaeological salvage excavation undertaken at the former RTA Site, located at 109-113 George Street, Parramatta in early 2005, yielded a total of 4,775 lithic artefacts and a large quantity of manuport stone (stone brought to the site from elsewhere). As with the lithic assemblages found on the Meriton Building site, this lithic assemblage is similarly divided into the two identified broad time periods (based on stratigraphic changes, raw material preference and manufacturing techniques) and included: backed artefacts, anvils, ground stone hatchet heads and other ground stone. The stone artefact evidence indicates that a range of activities were being carried out at this site by Aboriginal people over a long time period, possibly from the late Pleistocene period through to the late Holocene times.

In May 2005 an archaeological salvage excavation was undertaken at the nearby site of 95-101 George Street, Parramatta. The salvage excavation recovered 601 lithic artefacts, including a rare edge ground axe fragment. Based on inferred dates from the Meriton Building and RTA sites, dates from between 10,000 and 30,000 years BP are expected to be established for the deepest artefact bearing deposits.

The substantial archaeological record that has been uncovered as a result of archaeological investigation of the sand body, has contributed to our understanding of pre-colonial Aboriginal occupation of the Parramatta area and more broadly, the Cumberland Plain. The antiquity of some of this archaeological record and evidence for change over time is significant to Australian archaeology generally.

=== Military Barracks and Soldiers Garden ===
Within days of the First Fleet's arrival in Port Jackson, Governor Phillip had convicts clearing and cultivating land at Farm Cove. It soon became apparent however, that the land around Farm Cove was too poor to grow the quantities of food required for the fledgling colony to survive and more fertile land was needed. In April 1788 an exploration party, led by Phillip, explored along Parramatta River. On the third day of their exploration the party found a natural phenomenon, "...where the hill had been scoured by the river, thus cutting a semi-circular shape into the hill whilst the river formed a billabong below". This natural feature was named "The Crescent" by Phillip and from the top of this hill Phillip and his party saw what appeared to be thousands of acres of arable land.

On 2 November, Phillip returned to "The Crescent" (which is now part of Parramatta Park) to determine the best place to establish an agricultural settlement. Two days later a group of ten convicts and a detachment of marines arrived at the site (named Rose Hill by Governor Phillip), to establish a government farm. Farming at Rose Hill proved successful and the agricultural settlement quickly developed into a town, which for a time outgrew Sydney in size and importance.

In July 1790, Governor Phillip decided to replace the growing cluster of temporary buildings and lay out a town plan for Rose Hill, a vigorous building program was begun. The major axis of the town was an east-west track from Government Wharf to the Redoubt (located in Parramatta Park) with High Street, now known as George Street, as the principal avenue through the settlement. In August 1790 Governor Phillip commenced arrangements for the establishment of permanent accommodation for town garrison. Ground for a large garden was set aside for use of the New South Wales Corps and by September, a convict with brick making experience, was tasked with burning bricks for the new military barracks. The barracks were to be sited approximately 150 yards from Government Wharf. Historical mapping and archaeological evidence indicates that the barracks were situated along George Street in the area bound by Harris Street and 153 George Street, Harris Park.

Judge Advocate, David Collins, records in his account of the early colony that the foundations for the first of the new barrack buildings were laid in November 1790 (although another historical source gives the date as being early December). The barrack building was to be 100 feet long by 24 feet wide to accommodate one company of soldiers with the proper number of officers, as well as a guard room and two small store rooms. The lack limestone meant that the bricks used in the construction of the building were bonded together using a mud mortar and the building could only stand 12 feet high to avoid the mud mortar being washed out in heavy rains.

On 4 March 1791 Governor Phillip reported that a barrack for 100 men was complete at Rose Hill. He also advised that an officers barrack would be completed in May, after which construction of a third barrack building would commence. It appears from David Collins' account of the early colony, that construction of the barracks was far enough advanced as to permit the NSW South Wales Corps to occupy the site in May 1791.

A drawing by G. W. Evans of the military barracks, dated 1804, shows the barracks as comprising three wings arranged in a "u" shape around a central parade ground and set well back from George Street. An undated plan of the site shows associated buildings (such as kitchens, privies and coach house) as being located behind the barrack buildings. The soldiers garden was to the south of the barracks and extended to the ponds of Clay Cliff Creek.

Surviving documentation indicates that the barracks were constructed of poor quality bricks (possibly under-fired) with a mud mortar as a bonding agent, and it was soon apparent that the buildings would not last. Collins records in his account of the early colony, that in January 1798 the military barracks (along with other buildings in the settlement) were in such a state of disrepair that they could not support their own weight. Despite efforts to repair the buildings by March 1810 the then governor, Lachlan Macquarie, had determined that new barracks were needed. He informed the Colonial Office that considerable monies would soon need to be expended to erect new military barracks. Work on the new barracks at the site of the current Lancer Barracks in Smith Street, Parramatta was underway by March 1819. It was reported at the time that the old barracks were too decayed to be occupied any longer. It is unclear when the old military barracks were demolished however they appear to have been removed by the time the site of the barracks was granted to Archdeacon Thomas Hobbes Scott in 1829.

==== Site of Military Barracks and Soldiers Garden Post 1829 ====
Archdeacon Scott does not appear to have ever resided on the property he acquired in 1829. Scott's grant and his adjoining property (to the south) was rented to James Orr and in 1833 Orr purchased the property. In 1844 the Orr family sold the property to timber merchant John Purchase. Brownrigg's 1844 plan of Parramatta shows that the barracks had been demolished by this date.

The Purchase family operated a large commercial nursery known as Somerset Nursery on the site. In 1897 the Bank of New South Wales took possession of the "Purchase Estate." Despite the loss of family control over the property, the Purchase family continued to operate Somerset Nursery on the site.

In the early 1900s the Bank of NSW began selling off parts of the estate and then in 1915 the bank subdivided the remainder of the estate and arranged an auction sale in November of that year. The 1915 auction poster for the "Somerset Nursery Estate" advertised 27 "choice" building sites as being available however, aerial photographs of the site in c. 1930 and in 1943 indicates that a large portion of the estate remained undeveloped. The aerial photographs show that the majority of the re-development on the site was concentrated along the George Street frontage. In the 1952 a large portion of former Purchase family estate was gazetted as Robin Thomas Reserve. Parramatta City Council later acquired 137-147 George Street and 115 Harris Street, Harris Park and the land was added to the reserve.

In November 2003 archaeological testing was carried out on the corner of Harris and George Streets by Casey & Lowe Pty Ltd. The purpose of the testing was to determine whether there was any trace of the military barracks on the site. The results of the archaeological testing program indicated that the eastern strip of the study area contains relics that are thought to be associated with the military barracks. These remains comprise a sandstone-capped drain and sandstock brick footings. The sandy mortar and flat sandstock bricks of the footings are characteristic of the construction methods associated with early convict built structures. The drain is also typical of early construction techniques.

==== Comparative Analysis ====
The circa 1790 Parramatta Military Barracks was one of only two military barracks built during the period of Captain Arthur Phillip's term as Governor of NSW. The other military barracks constructed in this period was the Sydney Barracks located in the area around Wynyard Park. The Sydney Barracks (erected by 1792) remained in use until 1848 when new barracks at Paddington were completed. The site of the original barracks was subdivided and residences and shops were built at this location. Part of the parade ground was retained as recreation space (Wynyard Park). In c. 1925 work began on the underground railway line from Central railway station to Circular Quay with Wynyard railway station constructed below Wynyard Park. To construct Wynyard Station, Wynyard Park was completely excavated with most of its significant fabric being destroyed.

== Description ==
The subject site contains a section of the Parramatta Sand Body and the site of the Military Barracks and Soldiers Garden established in circa 1790. The site is within Robin Thomas Reserve which is located on the eastern fringe of the Parramatta Central Business District. It is bound on the north by George Street, on the west by Harris Street, on the south by Lot 7 DP720779 (formerly part of Hassall Street) and on the east by 153 George Street and Lot 7049 DP 93899 of Robin Thomas Reserve.

The bulk of the subject site comprises playing fields. The northern end of site contains a building occupied by the Granville-Waratah Soccer Club and a kiosk, shower and toilet facility. The north-east corner of the site is occupied by two houses. One of the houses is in use by a community group, the City of Parramatta Art Society.

=== Military Barracks ===
Historical documentation and archaeological evidence indicates that the military barracks were located in the northern end of the Robin Thomas Reserve, fronting what is now known as George Street. The barracks comprised three wings in a "U" shape around a central parade ground.

=== Description of the Parramatta Sand Body ===
The geomorphic origin of the sand is still unclear but the present interpretation is that the sand body was deposited by the Parramatta River on a terrace 4 to 6 metres above normal water level, on either side of the river between Charles and Alfred Streets and in the eastern margin of Parramatta Park. The sand body was deposited as a terrace (abandoned floodplain) over time during floods.

The bulk of the sand body forms a levee located on the south side (right bank) of Parramatta River just above the 1:100 average recurrence interval flood level. The levee is thought to extend from Church Street to Arthur Street and south from the river to the eastern end of Macquarie Street along Hassall Street from Harris Street and on the north side of Oak Street to about Arthur Street where it must interface with the clay alluvium of Clay Cliff Creek.

The Sand Body has a well developed but varied soil profile. Topsoil materials are generally disturbed by European activities. Where the subsoils are intact they typically consists of yellow orange or yellow brown sandy clay with an earthy (porous) fabric that becomes paler and slightly mottled with depth. The upper parts of the soil profile are usually heavily mixed, especially by cicada larvae.

In places the sand is cut by deposits of mottled or gleyed clay that were probably deposited in swamps or waterholes on the terrace surface. The reasonably defined levee, 50 to 100 centimetres high, along the terrace edge between Charles and Alfred Streets, comprises cleaner and very slightly coarser sand than the sand found around the margins of the levee.

The profile of the sand suggests that the main body of sand is of late Pleistocene age and recent thermoluminescence dates obtained from an excavation undertaken at 140 Macquarie Street by Comber Consultants Pty Ltd in 2010, have shown that the top of the undisturbed sand (below the level of Aboriginal occupation) is between 50.000 and 58,000 years old. Deeper sand could be much older and may relate to a period of a higher sea level about 120,000 years ago.

Much of the original sand body is likely to have been destroyed by the construction of modern buildings but patches of the sand body are preserved beneath the foundations of some CBD buildings and on vacant land. The least disturbed section of the main body of the sand occurs as a 50-60 metre wide belt along the southern side of the George Street between Harris Street and Purchase Street. The subject listing includes the section of the levee between Harris Street and 153 George Street, Harris Park.

=== Condition ===
==== Barracks Site ====
Considerable disturbance has been caused by demolition and subsequent construction on the site. This begins with the demolition in the first half of the 19th century of the military barracks. Despite the disturbance significant archaeological remains have been uncovered on the site, including a sandstock brick footing thought to be associated with the early barracks. The site has the potential to contain further remains associated with the barracks as well as relics and deposits associated with later phases of occupation. The site's potential to contain Aboriginal cultural material is discussed in greater detail below but archaeological investigation of the sand body has shown that evidence of pre-colonial Aboriginal occupation of the Parramatta CBD survives beneath levels of European occupation.

==== Parramatta Sand Body Conservation Area ====
The conservation area has been identified as an area of high sensitivity on the archaeological zoning map prepared by Mary Dallas Consulting Archaeologists as part of a large-scale archaeological review and planning study done on behalf of Parramatta City Council.

The conservation area has the potential to contain evidence of pre-colonial and early colonial Aboriginal occupation for the following reasons:

- The conservation site would have been an attractive location for Aboriginal people in the pre-colonial or early colonial period. The area had ready access to two permanent water sources, Parramatta River and Clay Cliff Creek and mixed resources (forest, riverine and estuarine). Additional resources such as, waterfowl and water plants were available from a large water lagoon, with 3 three ponds, that was located behind the former residence "Ellangowan" in the centre of the block bounded by Harris, Hassall, Purchase and George Streets;
- Auger samples taken by geomorphologist Dr Peter Mitchell, indicate the presence of suitable (i.e. deep) soil profiles on site. The depth of the fluvial sand deposit provides the opportunity for the preservation of evidence of early occupation of the region. As the sand body formed on a site where sediment periodically accumulated, it is possible that the area contains stratified archaeological material which is rare occurrence for open sites.
- Recent excavations at George Street, Parramatta found similar soil deposits as those reported by Dr Peter Mitchell, as being within the proposed conservation area. Aboriginal archaeological material dating from the Holocene period and possibly earlier were found within the soils. Given the similarity of soil deposits, the subject site has the potential to contain similar archaeological deposits.

The site has undergone considerable disturbance (particularly along the George Street frontage) as a result of demolition and subsequent construction activity. However, archaeological investigation indicates that relics and deposits related to past historical land use are present on the site.

If Aboriginal cultural material is present on the site, historical activity is likely to have disturbed artifacts and/or cultural deposits located in the upper layers of the sand body.

=== Modifications and dates ===
The bulk of the development that has taken place on the subject site has been clustered long the George Street frontage.

19th-century redevelopment

- Circa 1790 military barracks demolished by at least 1844 and probably by 1829.
- 1844 the site was sold to the John Purchase. The Purchase family operated a nursery on the site. A valuation of the Purchase Estate in 1894 lists the following structures as being present on the site: a terrace of 7 small cottages; a small shop and cottage on the corner of George and Harris Streets; a stone residence ('Somerset Cottage') and associated out buildings including kitchen stables, sheds, storerooms and flower houses.

20th-century redevelopment

- After 1895 the terrace of 7 cottages were demolished and four residences were constructed on the site of the terrace. Today only two of these residences survive.
- "Somerset Cottage" appears to have survived until at least the 1950s.
- The shop on the corner of the George and Harris Street also appears to have survived into the 1950s.
- By 1961 the cottage and shop had been demolished and a service station, comprising a simple building with canopy, occupied the corner of George and Harris Streets.
- In 2003 the service station building was demolished and the petrol tanks were removed in 2004. The removal of the tanks was carried out under the supervision of an archaeologist to minimise disturbance of the site.

An aerial photograph of the reserve taken in 1943 indicates that the remainder of the subject site was left relatively undeveloped in the first half of the 20th century. Aside from the development clustered around the George Street frontage, the photograph shows only one other lot as being developed. Today playing fields occupy a large part of Robin Thomas Reserve. The reserve contains two structures: the Granville - Waratah Soccer clubhouse, constructed in the 1980s, is located on Lot 5 DP 192710; and a kiosk, shower and toilet facility is located along the rear boundary of the residential property, formerly 145 George Street, Harris Park.

== Heritage listing ==
=== Parramatta Sand Body Conservation Area ===
The Parramatta Sand Body is an important cultural landscape. Archaeological investigation of the sand body has uncovered a substantial archaeological record that has contributed to our understanding of pre-colonial Aboriginal occupation of the Parramatta area and more broadly, the Cumberland Plain. The antiquity of some of this archaeological record and evidence of change over time is significant to Australian archaeology generally. For the local Aboriginal people whose ancestors lived on and used the sand body for many thousands of years before the arrival of non-Aboriginal people, the sand body has special significance. The sand body is a tangible link with their cultural past.

The Parramatta Sand Body Conservation Area has the potential to provide further insight into the diet and lifestyle of Aboriginal people in pre-colonial times. Prior to non-indigenous settlement of the area, the site would have been an attractive location for Aboriginal people, as it had ready access to, two permanent water sources and mixed resources. Archaeological investigations of parts of the sand body in close vicinity to the conservation area, have revealed evidence of pre-colonial Aboriginal occupation.

From a geomorphic perspective, the sand body has the potential to provide insight into patterns of river flow and flood events that could lead to a better understanding of the formation of the Parramatta River Valley. On a broader scale, the sand body may be able to provide valuable information about changing sea levels in the Pleistocene period with implications for possible future sea levels and coastal geography under a warming climate.

In addition to the archaeological and geomorphic research value of the sand body, the Parramatta Sand Body also has the potential to provide valuable insight into the natural environment of Parramatta CBD in pre-colonial times. The fluvial sand terrace is evidence that Parramatta had a more diverse natural environment than might otherwise have been known from historical accounts, which provide few details about the natural vegetation of area. Pollen, which may be preserved within the sand body, could yield valuable information about the original vegetation of the Parramatta CBD area.

=== Site of Military Barracks and Soldiers Garden ===
The site of Military Barracks and Soldiers Garden is of state significance for its association with the establishment of the town of Parramatta and for its association with the works of Governor Arthur Phillip. Governor Phillip established a settlement at Parramatta in 1788 and by 1790 he commenced building works to establish vital infrastructure for a town. Amongst the early building works he undertook, was the construction of military barracks for the town garrison. The barracks are also of significant for their association with the New South Wales Corps. The NSW Corps arrived as guards on the Second Fleet in June 1790 to relieve the marines who had accompanied the First Fleet. Members of the NSW Corps served as the garrison at Parramatta and were housed in the newly erected military barracks.

The site of the Military Barracks and Soldiers Garden is a rare archaeological site. It was one of two military barracks built during the period of Captain Arthur Phillip's term as Governor of NSW. The site, which was occupied by the NSW Corps in May 1791, has the potential to provide the earliest surviving physical evidence of a convict period military barracks in Australia. Relics and deposits of the Military Barracks and Soldiers Garden may yield knowledge, which may not be available from other sources, about the nature of the institutionalised life of soldiers in the early colony. In addition, archaeological remains associated with the barracks may contribute to our knowledge of the nature and availability of building resources in NSW in the late 18th and early 19th Century.

Parramatta Sand Body Conservation Area and Military Barracks Site was listed on the New South Wales State Heritage Register on 8 July 2011 having satisfied the following criteria.

The place is important in demonstrating the course, or pattern, of cultural or natural history in New South Wales.

Parramatta Sand Body

The Parramatta Sand Body is an important cultural landscape. The substantial archaeological record uncovered as a result of archaeological investigation of the sand body, has contributed to our understanding of pre-colonial Aboriginal occupation in the Parramatta area and more broadly, the Cumberland Plain. The antiquity of some of this archaeological record and evidence of change over time is significant to Australian archaeology generally.

Site of Military Barracks and Soldiers Garden

The site of the Military Barracks and Soldiers Garden is associated with the earliest days of the foundation of Parramatta, Australia's second settlement. Parramatta, which for a time in the late 18th century outgrew Sydney in population and importance, was established in 1788 and by July 1790 Governor Phillip had commenced building works to establish vital infrastructure for the town. Amongst the early building works undertaken, was the construction of accommodation for the town garrison.

The place has a strong or special association with a person, or group of persons, of importance of cultural or natural history of New South Wales's history.

Parramatta Sand Body

Archaeological investigation of sites in the vicinity of the Parramatta Sand Body Conservation Area has revealed that the sand body contains evidence of pre-colonial Aboriginal occupation along the Parramatta River through the Parramatta CBD.

Site of Military Barracks and Soldiers Garden

The site of the Military Barracks and Soldiers Garden is associated with the NSW Corps. The New South Wales Corps arrived as guards on the Second Fleet in June 1790 to relieve the marines who has accompanied the First Fleet. Members of the NSW Corps served as the town garrison at Parramatta and were housed in the newly erected military barracks, which they occupied from May 1791.

The site is also associated with the works of NSW's first Governor, Captain Arthur Phillip. The Barracks were constructed on this site as part of Governor Phillip's vigorous building plan for the town of Parramatta, which commenced in mid 1790.

The place has strong or special association with a particular community or cultural group in New South Wales for social, cultural or spiritual reasons.

Parramatta Sand Body

The sand body has special significance for the local Aboriginal people, whose ancestors lived on and used the sand body for many thousands of years before the arrival of non-Aboriginal people. For the Aboriginal community, the sand body is a tangible link with their cultural past and it has the potential to provide insight into the lives of their ancestors.

The place has potential to yield information that will contribute to an understanding of the cultural or natural history of New South Wales.

Parramatta Sand Body

In pre-colonial times, the conservation area would have been an attractive location for Aboriginal people as it had ready access to two permanent water sources and access to mixed resources. Archaeological investigation of sites in close vicinity to the conservation area has uncovered a substantial archaeological record of pre-colonial Aboriginal occupation of the Parramatta CBD. The conservation area has the potential to yield further information about the diet and lifestyle of Aboriginal people living in Parramatta and more broadly the Cumberland Plain, prior to the arrival of non Aboriginal settlers.

From a geomorphic perspective, the sand body has the potential to provide insight into patterns of river flow and flood events that could lead to a better understanding of the formation of the Parramatta River Valley. On a broader scale, the sand body may be able to provide valuable information about sea level change in the Pleistocene period with implications for possible future sea levels and coastal geography under a warming climate.

The sand body also has the potential to provide insight into the natural environment of Parramatta CBD in the pre-colonial period. The fluvial sand terrace is evidence that Parramatta had a more dynamic and diverse natural environment that would otherwise have been known from historical accounts, which provide few details about the natural vegetation of the area. Pollen, which may be preserved within the sand body, could yield valuable information about the original vegetation of the area which is otherwise poorly documented by historical evidence.

Site of Military Barracks and Soldiers Garden

Relics and deposits of the circa 1790 Military Barracks and Soldiers Garden have the potential to yield knowledge, which may not be available from other sources, about the nature of the institutionalised life of soldiers in the early colony. In addition, relics and deposits associated with the barracks may contribute to our knowledge of the nature and availability of building resources in NSW in the late 18th and early 19th Centuries.

The place possesses uncommon, rare or endangered aspects of the cultural or natural history of New South Wales.

Military Barracks and Soldiers Garden

The Site of the Military Barracks and Soldiers Garden is a rare archaeological site. The circa 1790 Parramatta military barracks was one of only two military barracks built during the period of Captain Arthur Phillip's term as Governor of NSW. The site has the potential to provide the earliest surviving physical evidence of a convict period military barracks in Australia.
