= Experiment Farm Cottage =

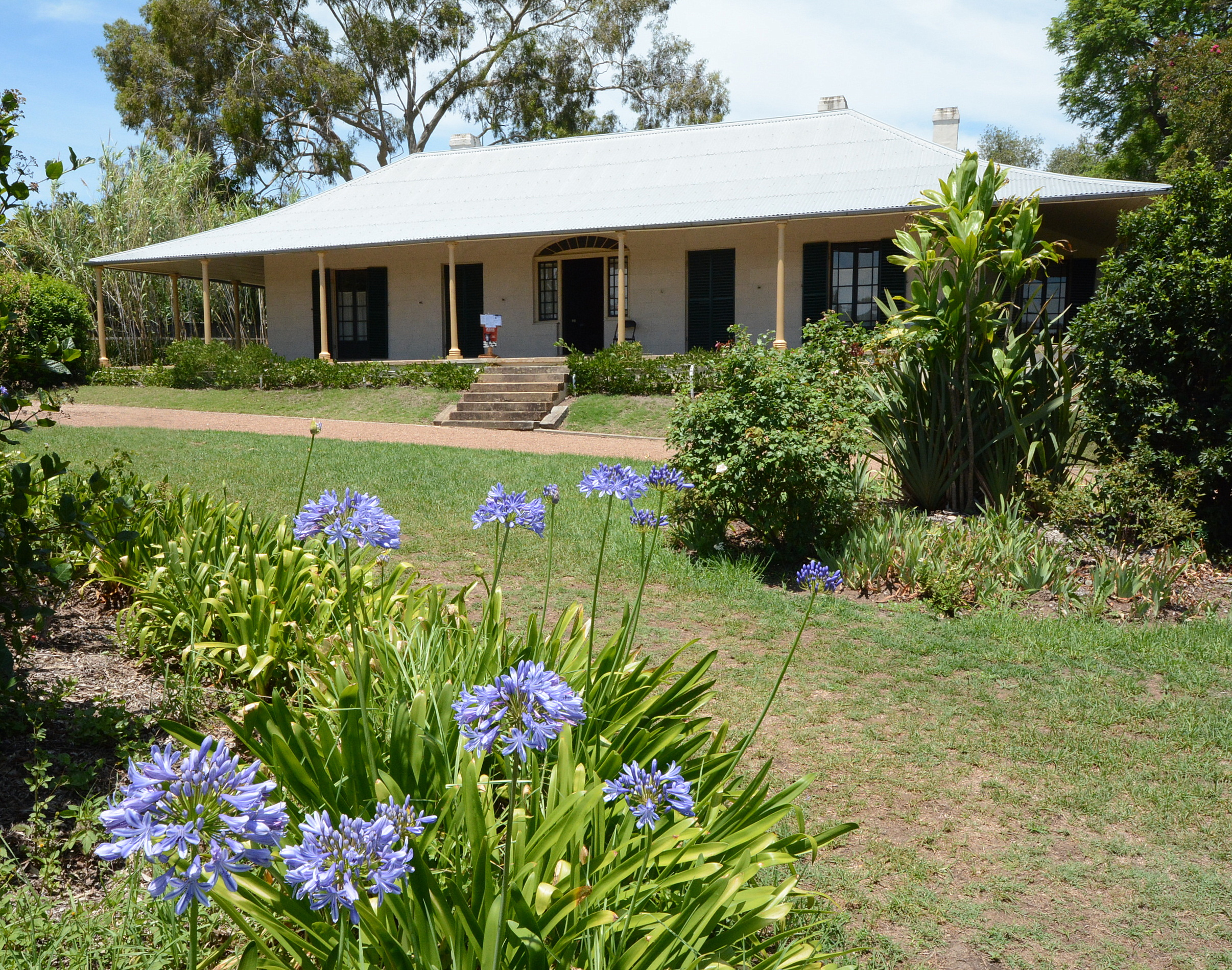
- Experiment Farm Cottage

- Location within Sydney
- 33°49′12″S 151°00′45″E
- Location: 9 Ruse Street, Harris Park, Parramatta, New South Wales, Australia

History
- Built: Mid-1790s-c. 1834
- Built for: John Harris and family

Site notes
- Architectural style: Old Colonial Georgian
- Owner: National Trust of Australia (NSW)

New South Wales Heritage Register
- Official name: Experiment Farm Cottage
- Type: State heritage (complex / group)
- Designated: 2 April 1999
- Reference no.: 768
- Type: Homestead Complex
- Category: Farming and Grazing
- Builders: John Harris

Experiment Farm Cottage is a heritage-listed former farm and residence and now house museum at 9 Ruse Street, Harris Park, City of Parramatta, Sydney, Australia. It is one of Australia's oldest standing residences, being built in c. 1834. It is located at the site of Experiment Farm, Australia's first European farmstead, which was itself created by Australia's first land grant. It was added to the New South Wales State Heritage Register on 2 April 1999.

== History ==
In 1789, James Ruse was chosen by Governor Arthur Phillip to run an experiment to see how long it would take a man to support himself. Ruse was granted 0.61 hectares (1.5 acres) of cleared land, as well as assistance for clearing an additional 2.0 hectares (5 acres). He was also provided with two sows and six hens. He was fed and clothed from the public store for 15 months, after which time he had become successfully self-sufficient and was granted an additional 12 hectares (30 acres).

In October 1793, Ruse sold his farm to surgeon John Harris, builder of the substantial colonial cottage which exists today. Harris already owned the adjacent property. At the time Harris had many varied roles in the colony, including Magistrate, Deputy Judge Advocate, Superintendent of Police and Naval Officer. He went on to become one of the wealthiest pastoralists in the colony, owning extensive properties in New South Wales.

Harris, born in County Londonderry, Ireland, spent at least ten years in the Navy as a surgeon's mate, and sailed in New South Wales in his own 21 foot wherry. He was a soldier when serving as an officer in the New South Wales Corps. In the roles of judge advocate and magistrate he functioned as a lawyer. As a public servant in the early 1800s and again in the mid-1820s he was head policeman: as a naval port officer he was a tax man and a government spy. As a builder occasionally contracted by government he constructed the road to South Head in 1803 and public buildings including a toll house in Parramatta in 1829. Displaying the skills of an architect and design engineer he oversaw construction of the 59 ton government schooner, "Integrity", the Sydney Court House and his own substantial dwellings at Parramatta, Ultimo and South Creek. He was a farmer and a grazier; an explorer who participated in several expeditions including that of Colonel William Paterson to the Hunter in 1803 and Surveyor John Oxley's 1818 expedition to the interior; a mercantile agent; and a banker, being one of the founding directors of the Bank of New South Wales - the colony's first bank. A busy many, he played many of these roles while serving as a surgeon to the New South Wales Corps. While never a pauper, when he served as a surgeon's third mate in the Royal Navy in India during the 1770s and 1780s he was not affluent. Yet, by the early 1800s he was a rich man. In 1804 he constructed the first two storeyed verandahed house in the colony (Ultimo House) and had imported deer from India as hunt quarry. In 1814 he gave architect Francis Greenway his first private commission.

The cottage is in the form of the Indian Bungalow, a verandahed form Harris saw in Bengal, India from his arrival in 1782, that was used to house English officers on service there. The cottage's form originated in Bengal, which was the first region the British moved from coastal forts to occupy the interior. Such Anglo-Indian dwellings were primarily used as residence or a place for both living and working, with an office incorporated into the plan. Their builders used traditional Indian strategies to respond to climatic conditions, maximising ventilation and shade and protection from heavy rain while meeting European expectations of form and comfort. It emerged as a "culturally distinctive house form", the typical "up-country" dwelling for British officials. This form had its attractions for Harris in New South Wales when he not only attended outpatients but occasionally accommodated the very ill at his home. The hot summers and cool winters of Sydney had more in common with Bengal than Moneymore. The tightly closed houses of Ireland, designated to minimise draughts, were not appropriate in India or New South Wales. The bungalow as adopted by the British was characterised by a pitched thatched roof, a verandah and a raised base platform. It was a free-standing single storey structure. The verandah was sometimes adapted by the British to encircle the house with parts semi-enclosed for privacy and shade. With the possible exception of the thatching, these essential qualities are also characteristics of Experiment Farm Cottage, constructed in the mid-1790s at Parramatta by Harris. Dr Wilson's bungalow house at Moidapur bears striking similarities with Harris' Experiment Farm Cottage. Both have a verandah integrated into the roof, both are built on a platform, both have shutters, and both have part of the verandah partially enclosed. Both men were in Bengal in the early 1780s.

The property stayed in the Harris family until 1921, when the land was subdivided and the suburb of Harris Park was created.

The site was acquired by the National Trust of Australia (NSW) in 1961, after the establishment of the Women's Committee including women such as Dame Helen Blaxland and Rachel Roxburgh, which raised the necessary funds of 4,500 pounds. This committee was established to raise funds, source furnishings and promote Trust membership. Experiment Farm Cottage was the first property the National Trust (NSW) acquired and the Trust restored and furnished the cottage with colonial pieces and opened it to the public. Ms Roxburgh wrote the first guide books for the property for the Trust.

In 1960 Cherry Jackaman joined Dame Helen Blaxland on the Women's Committee of the National Trust (NSW). Jackaman chaired this committee from 1964–67 and by 1968 had raised more than $100,000, which was directed to repairs work at Experiment Farm Cottage, Lindesay and the St. Matthew's Anglican Church at Windsor Appeal.

In 1963 the cottage was opened by the National Trust (NSW) as Australia's first house museum with a focus on Australian colonial furniture.

In 1967 the National Trust reconstituted the Lindesay Garden Group as the National Trust Garden Committee, with Diana Pockley as chair. This Committee's work was broader, including work on replanting the grounds of Experiment Farm Cottage, Parramatta, Old Government House, Parramatta and Riversdale, Goulburn.

A Parramatta Properties Committee was established to advise and guide works, dating (at least) from 1968, and chaired from 1971-2 by Dame Helen Blaxland. This committee was disbanded in 1984.

Since acquisition, Federal and State Government funds have been made available to also purchase adjoining blocks of land/ houses and demolish these, helping to create a more credible landscape setting for what was John Harris' simple farm cottage complex. Centenary of Federation funds from the Federal Government allowed implementation of a reinstated simple farm garden based on evidence of early - mid 19th century garden plantings around the cottage, including appropriate farm fencing, reinstated plantings such as giant Danubian reed (Arundo donax) on the north-east corner of the cottage, and a bunya pine (Araucaria bidwillii) to its north.

These same funds allowed the closure of Ruse Street to the west of the cottage, reinstatement of a narrowed carriage drive in front (north) of the cottage, and a new reduced width public road access east of the cottage connecting to Ruse Street (east), based on the location and form of a known earlier farm track.

In preparation for the 50th anniversary of the opening of the cottage as a house museum by the Trust, the cottage has undergone a much-needed restoration program of works, funded by the Dame Helen Blaxland Foundation and NSW State Heritage Grants. It was reopened to the public in July 2013, with a celebration of the 50th anniversary of its first public opening, with NSW Governor and National Trust Patron Marie Bashir re-enacting the 1963 event. Visitation increased from 3581 in 2012/13 to 4557 in 2013/14. The caretaker's cottage was refurbished in 2014 making it suitable for rental accommodation, and work on the rear garden was carried out under the supervision of Colleen Morris, enhancing its appeal for events.

== Description ==
Experiment Farm Cottage is an Old Colonial Georgian house with symmetrical front and low pitched hipped roof continuous over verandah of vertically seamed iron. The entrance consists of a six-panelled door flanked by sidelights and with an elliptical fanlight above.

It sits in a small domestic garden with some mature trees, including jacaranda, (Jacaranda mimosaefolia), lemon scented gum (Corymbia citriodora), fruit trees and cottage plants. Since 2001 a more appropriate 19th century pleasure garden to the north has been reconstructed, based on early photographs and records, and comprising 2 large oval beds with mixed tree and shrub planting, a series of "framing" trees including a hoop pine (Araucaria cunninghamiana) and others.

Ruse Street's eastern end is closed off from the west and now accessed by a new diversion local street, on the alignment of a known former farm track, immediately to the east of Experiment Farm Cottage. This road is finished as though it were a gravel farm track, and farm-style post and rail fencing abuts it, and Alice Street to the south.

The remaining setting of Experiment Farm Cottage is of an early 1900s residential subdivision, of mostly single-storey California bungalow cottages, with some later infill of blocks of flats, dating from the 1960s, and some 1980s & 1990s single houses, some two storey. This is the last subdivision of the Harris Farm estate, and its boundary represents (roughly) the 12 hectares (30 acres) of land originally granted to James Ruse in 1788.

Experiment Farm Cottage is fully professionally conserved.

=== Modifications and dates ===
- 1788-93: James Ruse farms first land grant in Australia, experimental farm of 12 hectares (30 acres)
- 1793: Surgeon John Harris buys, incorporates into "Harris Farm", cultivates, and clears land
- c. 1834 Cottage constructed, in front of earlier cottage of 1809
- 1850s: railway extended to Parramatta to west of estate, start of subdivisions
- 1920s: subdivision of Harris estate in stages to form modern suburb of Harris Park, Ruse Street formed north of EFC, Alice Street to south. Cottage's address to north blocked by cottages on northern side of Ruse Street
- 1950s: Parramatta City Council acquire Hambledon Cottage to east of reserve/site and convert to house museum (Parramatta & District Historical Society run it)
- 1961: National Trust (NSW) acquire Cottage block for house museum after establishment of the Women's Committee including women such as Dame Helen Blaxland and Rachel Roxburgh, which raised the necessary funds of A£4,500. This was the first property the National Trust (NSW) acquired, and the Trust has since restored and furnished the cottage with colonial pieces and opened it to the public
- 1967: the National Trust reconstituted the Lindesay Garden Group as the National Trust Garden Committee, with Diana Pockley as chair. This Committee's work was broader, including work on replanting the grounds of Experiment Farm Cottage, Parramatta, Old Government House, Parramatta and Riversdale, Goulburn
- 1970-80s: Federal Government acquire a number of house lots adjoining EFC and demolished to improve the setting of EFC, ownership of lots transferred to Parramatta City Council as James Ruse Reserve. Acquisition/conversion links Hambledon & EFC. Federal and State Government funds have been made available to also purchase adjoining blocks of land/ houses and demolish these, helping to create a more credible rural landscape setting for what was John Harris' simple farm cottage complex. A Parramatta Properties Committee was established to advise and guide works, dating (at least) from 1968, and chaired from 1971-2 by Dame Helen Blaxland. This committee was disbanded in 1984
- 2001/2: Centenary of Federation funds from the Federal Government allowed implementation of a reinstated simple farm garden based on evidence of early - mid 19th century garden plantings around the cottage, including appropriate farm fencing, reinstated plantings such as giant Danubian reed (Arundo donax) on the north-east corner of the cottage, and a bunya pine (Araucaria bidwillii) to its north. During the 1970s & 1980s a number of residential allotments adjoining Experiment Farm Cottage were resumed by the Federal Government with the aim of improving the setting of the Cottage. The houses on these allotments were demolished and the ownership of the newly created open space area was transferred to Parramatta City Council, to become part of the James Ruse Reserve. The boundary of the reserve was extended up to Experiment Farm Cottage. Through the creation of the reserves around the cottage, continuous park area now extends from Hambledon Cottage and Hassall Street (in the north-east and north) south to Experiment Farm Cottage and Alice Street in the south
- 2000-01: NSW National Trust undertook a landscape reconstruction of some of the immediate 19th century pleasure garden and carriage drive north of Experiment Farm Cottage. These works focussed on the lands around Ruse Street and south toward Alice Street. Ruse Street's eastern end was closed off and access redirected immediately to the east of Experiment Farm Cottage, along the alignment of a known former farm track. The new road was built to resemble a farm track, in finish, and fencing of a rural nature was installed on both sides of the new road. A carriage drive on the alignment of the original 19th century carriage drive replaced the former Ruse Street in front (north) of Experiment Farm Cottage. The remainder of the street surface and furniture (power poles, kerbs etc.) were removed or put underground and a pleasure garden based on early photographs and records was reconstructed. No. 14 Ruse Street was acquired by the Trust and demolished (1920s California bungalow), and its grounds incorporated into the reconstructed landscape of Experiment Farm Cottage, widening its views north and the public views south up the hill from Hassall Street/James Ruse Reserve
- 2000-1: Parramatta City Council installed a new pedestrian footbridge over Clay Cliff Creek north of Experiment Farm Cottage to provide easy access as part of the Harris Park Heritage Walk, a series of works to install a pedestrian path, landscaping and interpretive signage along a series of heritage items including Hambledon Cottage and Experiment Farm Cottage
- 2013: The 2013 restorations helped stabilise emerging problems including underpinning the north-east corner, internal plastering and painting, new electrical circuitry and power upgrade and re-rendering the cellar. A new fire alarm system and upgraded security alarm system including video surveillance have been installed. The house's presentation front and back have been improved with front and back verandahs lifted, levelled and re-grouted, the exterior painted, the rear garden landscaped, several important collection items repaired and restored. The caretaker's cottage has also been fully refurbished and refitted for the first time since 1962, the volunteer office and kitchen given a new fitout

== Heritage listing ==
Experiment Farm Cottage and the site of Experiment Farm is of exceptional cultural significance to Australia, NSW and Parramatta because:

- it forms part of the first European land grant in Australia;
- it is associated with the early agricultural pursuits, including Governor Phillip's "experiment" to determine the period required in which a settler could become self-supporting. The initial success of Experiment Farm encouraged Phillip to open the Parramatta area to free settlement;
- the location demonstrates the importance of the Parramatta area in the agricultural development and early survival of the European colony;
- Following its purchase by Surgeon John Harris, it became part of "Harris' Farm", one of several large properties established by the "Parramatta Gentry" from the late 18th- mid 19th century, including those owned by the Macarthurs, Marsdens, Kings, Wentworths and Blaxlands. The current Experiment Farm Cottage formed part of "Harris' Farm";
- It contains evidence of the various phases of the site from the late 18th century to the present, including:
- the topographical features associated with Ruse's Experiment Farm;
- the establishment of Harris' Farm and the construction of Experiment Farm Cottage;
- patterns of subdivision and the emergence of the present suburban setting;
- Experiment Farm Cottage is a finely detailed colonial bungalow dating to c. 1834. Its sophisticated design is demonstrated through the architectural treatment of the front facade, including French doors, delicate columns and main entrance, and the internal treatment of room configuration and its methods of integrating the verandah into the main area of the house;
- of its visual prominence in the surrounding landscape. The position of Experiment Farm Cottage demonstrates important relationships with the landscape. Situated on a once prominent rise, the current house addresses the north towards Parramatta River and Clay Cliff Creek;
- of its surviving fabric (both extant and archaeological), and the vast body of records documenting its historical development. In particular, resources from the 19th century provide information on the development and layout of Harris' Farm, including Experiment Farm Cottage and associated farm features such as former fence lines, carriage drive, farm roads, plantings, stables, outbuildings and pattern of subdivision;
- of its documented association with individuals who have helped shape its form and use, including Governor Phillip, James Ruse, Surgeon John Harris and his descendants, Pieter Laurentz Campbell and the Fraser family;
- it is a place highly valued by the community. Efforts by the community since the 1920s have assisted in its conservation, culminating in the acquisition of the property by the NSW National Trust in 1961. Local residents have expressed great interest in the ongoing conservation of the property and recognise its heritage significance as contributing towards the identity of Harris Park.

Experiment Farm cottage has a strong association with the earliest free settlement of land in Australia and with the first grant to a freed convict, James Ruse. It also has a strong association with John Harris. The house is a rare example of an early farmhouse in very intact condition. Site possesses archaeological potential to contribute to an understanding of early development in Parramatta.

Experiment Farm Cottage was listed on the New South Wales State Heritage Register on 2 April 1999 having satisfied the following criteria.

- The place is important in demonstrating the course, or pattern, of cultural or natural history in New South Wales.

Experiment Farm cottage was built and occupied by John Harris (1754-1838), surgeon of the colony and pioneer farmer. It was the site of the first successful agriculture in Australia, commenced by the first owner of the property James Ruse (1760-1837) and continued and developed by Harris and, on the adjacent property, John and Elizabeth Macarthur. It demonstrates the lifestyle of the early propertied colonial gentry, those in positions of power and influence in post-1788 Australian society.

- The place is important in demonstrating aesthetic characteristics and/or a high degree of creative or technical achievement in New South Wales.

Experiment Farm cottage is an archetypal Australian colonial house and helped pioneer the use of the verandah which became a major identifying feature of Australian architecture. The cottage is an elegant example of colonial Georgian rural architecture and demonstrates with substantial intactness the layout and functions of such buildings.

- The place has a strong or special association with a particular community or cultural group in New South Wales for social, cultural or spiritual reasons.

Experiment Farm cottage is widely held in high regard (both locally and nationally) as a strong link with Australia's early colonial past, this regard being demonstrated also in past attempts to recover some of the original setting of the house.

- The place has potential to yield information that will contribute to an understanding of the cultural or natural history of New South Wales.

The cottage and its site have the potential to yield worthwhile historical and archaeological information.

- The place possesses uncommon, rare or endangered aspects of the cultural or natural history of New South Wales.

Experiment Farm cottage demonstrates with rare quality early colonial processes, customs and activities. The cottage is likely to be one of the oldest extant structures in Australia.

- The place is important in demonstrating the principal characteristics of a class of cultural or natural places/environments in New South Wales.

Experiment Farm cottage is an outstanding characteristic example of an early colonial farmhouse built and occupied by the propertied gentry.

== See also ==
- Elizabeth Farm
- List of heritage houses in Sydney
