= Hambledon Cottage =

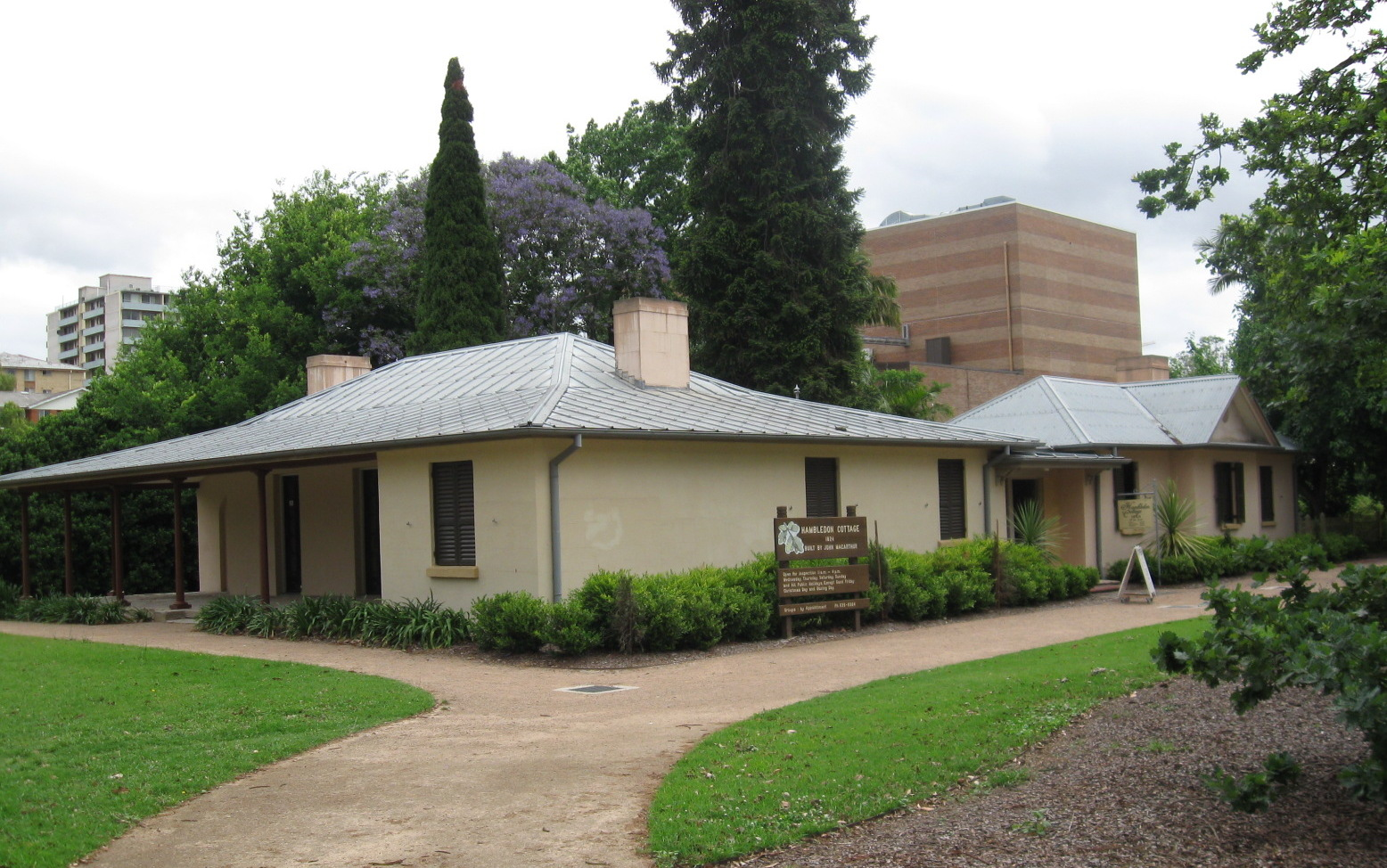

- Location within Sydney Location within Australia
- 33.8189°S 151.0150°E
- Location: 47 Hassall Street, Harris Park, City of Parramatta, Sydney, New South Wales, Australia

History
- Built: 1821–1825

Site notes
- Architect: Henry Kitchen (part)
- Owner: Parramatta City Council

New South Wales Heritage Register
- Official name: Hambledon Cottage, Grounds and Archaeology; Firholme; Valley Cottage; Macarthur Cottage
- Type: state heritage (complex / group)
- Designated: 21 September 2012
- Reference no.: 1888
- Type: Garden House
- Category: Parks, Gardens and Trees

Hambledon Cottage is a heritage-listed house and museum at 47 Hassall Street, Harris Park, New South Wales, a suburb of Sydney, Australia. The cottage was built from 1821 to 1825, with the initial section being designed by Henry Kitchen. It is also known as Firholme, Valley Cottage and Macarthur Cottage. The property is owned by Parramatta City Council. It was added to the New South Wales State Heritage Register on 21 September 2012.

== History ==
Hambledon Cottage was built between 1821 and 1824 on the north western corner of the 100 acre grant made to John Macarthur, soldier, entrepreneur and pastoralist, in 1793. This grant formed the basis of the 850 acre Elizabeth Farm Estate, which included Elizabeth Farm. It was originally believed that the cottage was constructed for his children's governess, Penelope Lucas, who served as the family governess when John Macarthur returned from London in 1805. However, it has been more recently accepted that it was constructed to supplement the accommodation at Elizabeth farm more generally.

The original cottage, now the main wing was designed by Henry Kitchen, although the building was a simplified version of his original design. Kitchen was employed on several of Macarthur's building projects and has been described as the main architectural rival to Francis Greenway. The gabled kitchen was added some time later.

Archdeacon Thomas Hobbes Scott, appointed archdeacon of NSW in 1824, became a friend of the Macarthur's and took up temporary residence in the cottage in 1825. He was responsible for the 1826 addition of a coach house and stable. There is suggestion that Henry Kitchen was responsible for their design despite having died in 1822. Elizabeth Macarthur noted that Scott was also responsible for having got the garden in good order. The existing coachman's cottage is considered to be an 1880s-1890s extension of the 1826 building, whilst the stables are no longer in existence.

Penelope Lucas took up residence in the cottage from 1827. Two potential reasons have been given for this, the shortage of sleeping arrangements at Elizabeth Farm and to John Macarthur's illness which saw him dislike having women resident at Elizabeth Farm. Lucas remained there until her death in 1836 as Macarthur had left her a small annuity in his will when he died in 1834, as well as lifetime residency of the cottage. It appears that there was no formal kitchen at the cottage when Lucas took up residence and she returned every afternoon to Elizabeth Farm for dinner. The kitchen wing on the western side of the cottage is believed to have been built sometime between 1832 and 1836. Macarthur's daughter Emmeline went to live with Penelope Lucas. Emmeline's move to the cottage was certainly due to Macarthur's illness during which he gradually banished all women from Elizabeth Farm. This was also a period in which Lucas undertook development of the garden.

Following John Macarthur's death ownership of the Elizabeth Farm Estate, including the cottage, transferred to Edward Macarthur. Following the death of Penelope Lucas the cottage was occupied by a number of Macarthur employees until 1839 when James Macarthur and his wife returned from England. They took up residence in the cottage until they moved to Camden. However, they continued to make use of the cottage when James came to Sydney to undertake his duties as a member of the New South Wales Legislative Assembly. In the meantime, Dr Matthew Anderson took up residency at the cottage between 1839 and 1847. The 1844 Plan of the Town of Parramatta shows that a number of outbuildings had been constructed at Hambledon Cottage.

Anderson was Assistant Colonial Surgeon between 1819 and 1824, resident surgeon at Parramatta Hospital and surgeon to the Female Factory and Orphan School. He also retained a private practice and was the Macarthur family physician. He made no changes during his period of residence.

Edward Macarthur arrived in NSW in 1851 to take up a position as Deputy Adjutant General of the Army and used Hambledon Cottage as his temporary residence. Many of his relatives, friends and army colleagues also stayed at the cottage. Under Edward a new entry was constructed on the northern facade, the house was re-roofed and a substantial plantation of trees was established.. By 1854 the cottage garden was enclosed with a low timber picket fence and double gates had been erected on the eastern side where there were also now dense shrubs.

Between 1864 and 1881 Hambledon Cottage was leased to two families, including the Bohle family and later, the Gill family. Little is known of the changes to the property during this period.

In 1872 Edward Macarthur died leaving a life interest in the Elizabeth Macarthur estate, including Hambledon Cottage, to his wife Sarah. It was his intention that the estate would eventually pass to his niece Elizabeth Onslow. However, financial necessity saw Sarah Macarthur reluctantly agree to subdivision and sale of the estate in 1881.

The north western portion of the estate was put up for sale in 1883 with Hambledon Cottage given the name Macarthur Cottage. The cottage site included a brick, four bedroom residence with attached kitchen, scullery, back pantry, servants bedroom and a bathroom. The kitchen yard included a range of large, detached brick buildings comprising a three roomed cottage, wash house, harness room, coach house, and four stall stable with hayloft above. The property was located on just over 2 acres of ground.

The cottage was purchased by Francis John Wickham for 1100 pounds and renamed Firholme. He lived there until his death in 1892, adding a new entrance with stone pillars and wrought iron gates with this name on them on Hassall Street. Wickham's wife and children remained at the property after his death until c. 1895-96. The 1895 Detail Plan of the area shows the building isolated on the large block, with a rectangular structure adjacent to the southeast boundary of 45 Hassall Street. The only other feature indicated near Hambledon Cottage is a small square, possibly representing a water tank or privy.

A series of tenants rented the cottage from the Wickham family until it was sold to Ella McCulloch in 1906. The property changed hands several times during the next 34 years and a number of changes were made to outbuildings.

In 1940 the cottage, together with adjoining lands, was purchased by The Goodyear Tyre & Rubber Co. (Australia) Ltd. There was concern that a factory would be constructed on the site, but this never eventuated due to community action. Occupants during Goodyear's ownership included one of the company's executives, John Henry Hall and his wife Sylvia Merle Hall.

In 1945 Kolynos Limited purchased the property. Their affiliate Whitehall Pharmacal Company sought to undertake development around the site in 1949. The local community again campaigned strongly against the proposal. The company agreed in 1953 to donate the historic portion of the site to Parramatta Council. An agreement was also made to allow Council to purchase three acres west of Hambledon Cottage to be used for associated purposes. In appreciation Cliff Street was formally renamed Gregory Place after the Australasian Manager of the Company, E. S. Gregory.

In 1959 extensive renovations were commenced by Parramatta Council under the guidance of the firm Buckland and Druce, honorary architects for the project. It was during this time that the cottage was renamed Hambledon Cottage. It was occupied by a caretaker who opened the house to the public as a folk museum until 1963 when the City of Parramatta Art Society was given a lease until 1964. Occupancy was given to the Parramatta and District Historical Society in 1964. Works were primarily exterior structural repairs and included roof works, removal of a concrete layer from the flagstones on the eastern verandah, painting, general renovation, repair to floors and replacement of some of the wooden verandah columns. The vaulted ceiling of the verandah was extensively repaired due to termite infestation. Further infestation was found following commencement of the works. A garage extension was completed in 1961.

In 1965 the Parramatta & District Historical Society were given occupation of the building in return for restoring and refurbishing the interior of the building in a style of the 1830-1850 Colonial period. Hambledon Cottage was opened in February 1966 as a house museum.

The grounds of Hambledon have been converted into a public reserve. They still contain some of the original or early layout (drive alignments, paths) and plantings put in by John Macarthur when it was part of the Elizabeth Farm Estate. These include several mature (some now in decline) English oak trees (Quercus robur) in the garden believed to have been planted by John Macarthur. Other mature trees gracing the grounds from early decades in Hambledon's existence include a cork oak (Quercus suber), jacaranda (Jacaranda mimosifolia), Illawarra plum/ plum or brown pine (Podocarpus elatus), firewheel tree (Stenocarpus sinuatus) and Osage orange (Maclura pomifera), a tree now rare east of the Great Dividing Range. Some of these plantings can be dated from shipping lists Macarthur brought with him of plants on board the "Lord Eldon" in 1817.

== Description ==
Hambledon Cottage is set back from Hassall Street on its northern side and Gregory Place on its eastern side. It is surrounded by a reserve containing a number of large mature trees. Picket fencing has been placed around the house itself and around the reserve with chains swung between the fence posts on the street frontings. A two rail and post rural style fence is located on the western boundary while a chain wire fence is located on the southern boundary

=== Cottage ===
The main cottage is formed by a hipped roof over a rectangular plan, Georgian style bungalow. The walls are of stuccoed brick, rendered and painted with imitation stonework courses etched into the render. The roof is galvanised iron sheeting which has replaced earlier shingles and iron roofing. Two original chimneys remain serving five of the rooms in the cottage. Cedar casement windows are set on sandstone sills with external shutters. French doors open onto a front verandah with diagonal stone flagging, unusual vaulted ceiling and slender timber Doric columns on sandstone plinths. The French doors have internal cedar screen shutters which fit into the reveals as panelling when not in use. The north east corner of the verandah has been modified by infilling in the 1820s to create a room.

=== Kitchen Wing ===
The once detached kitchen wing is now connected to the main house by a flat roofed structure. It features a central pediment above a projecting bay in the Georgian style on the northern facade. The kitchen wing roof has an unpainted galvanised iron sheeted hipped and gabled roof with a single chimney. Together the two buildings form an L shape.

The joinery throughout is Australian cedar of fine Georgian detailing. Some of the internal ceilings and walls are still of lath and plaster whilst one bedroom still has its original ironbark floor and part of the flooring in two other rooms (Study and Lucas Gallery) is original. Much of the hardwood flooring elsewhere was replaced with cypress pine during previous renovations. Lath and plaster ceilings and cornices have been replaced in a number of rooms by fibrous plaster. A domed brick oven adjoins the open fireplace in the kitchen. Most of the fireplaces through the building appear to have been replaced or modified.

Repair works to the building, including re-rendering, ventilation and foundation reconstruction, are evident.

=== The Coachman's Cottage ===
The cottage is a single storey, face brick structure with gabled, iron sheeted roof. The sandstock bricks are laid in English bond and the timber highlight hopper and double hung windows are set on stone sills with rubbed brick arch lintels. The building is divided into three separate rooms. One room is lined with cement render and painted, one has exposed brickwork. The third is painted and bagged brickwork with concrete screed on stone flagging and includes original timber window and door frames and timber lintels. Now a kitchen, this room has been suggested to have been a harness room, although evidence of this harness room does not clearly suggest that this is the correct location.

=== The Enclosed Garden ===
The rectangular garden area is defined on the east by a timber picket fence and cottage, on the north by the cottage and a picket fence and on the west by the toilet block, and coachman's cottage with sections of picket fence and on the south by a fence forming the boundary with the factory. It is dominated by a very large bunya pine at the rear of the cottage with substantial trees along the southern boundaryr. Species include cypress (Cupressus sp.), hackberry/ southern nettle tree (Celtis australis), sweet gum (Liquidambar styraciflua), and bangalow palms (Archontophoenix cunninghamiana). In the centre of the enclosed garden is a rough arbour of timber and pipe supporting Chinese wisteria (W.sinensis). The area under the large trees are planted with Kaffir lilies (Clivia spp.), cast-iron plant (Aspidistra elatior), Philodendron sp., fruit salad plant (Monstera deliciosa) and ferns. A number of shrubs were planted near the toilet block in 2005 including Eureka Lemon Tree (citrus limonum), Photinia (Photinia glabra), Sacred Bamboo (Nandina demestica Gulf Stream) and dwarf oleander (Nerium olender oink). The garden's distinctiveearly tree plantings show the application of European influences to the local scene and the living style of colonial society at the time.

Just inside the garden fence near the kitchen wing is an Osage orange tree (Maclura pomifera). This is a once-common spiny hedge species imported from Mid-West United States of America used in colonial Australia before the widespread introduction of fencing wire, that is now rare, particularly so east of the Great Dividing Range and in the Sydney basin.

Paved areas are located at the rear of the L-shaped building and under the arbour, while stepping stones connect the rear of the cottage with the eastern side of the coachman's cottage. At the rear of the cottage is a square brick structure covering a well with a hand-operated pump. A number of inlet pits with steel grates are located throughout the garden and the reserve beyond for site drainage.

=== The Parkland Reserve ===
Hambledon Reserve is a flat area devoted to passive recreation. It provides the landscape setting for the cottage, Coachman's cottage and garden.

The density of tree cover increases towards the cottage with several mature trees dating from the Macarthur period of ownership. These include several majestic English oaks (Quercus robur), a cork oak (Q.suber') a hoop pine ('Araucaria cunninghamii), Brazilian pepper tree (Schinus auriera) and a large camphor laurel (Cinnamomum camphora). Other species, some of a more recent date, include a firewheel tree (Stenocarpus sinuatus), Norfolk Island hibiscus/ white oak (Lagunaria patersonia), jacaranda (J.mimosifolia), a plum pine/brown/Illawarra plum (Podocarpus elatus), Photinia x serrulata and several eucalypts.

Outside the immediate reserve to the west is another area of open space extending to Harris Street. This features a large Port Jackson fig (Ficus rubiginosa) and a row of recently planted Port Jackson figs (F.rubiginosa) along the Hassall Street boundary.

Along part of the eastern boundary of the reserve facing Gregory Place is a small car parking area. There is also a small carpark in the southeastern corner of the reserve. A semi -circular carriage way connects to Hassell Street and crushed granite pathways lead through the reserve. Under the trees are a number of modern bench seats and picnic tables set on concrete plinths.

Part of the Hassall Street fence has a reinstated set of gate posts (in sandstone) and wrought iron gates, the former engraved with "Firholme" from the 1880s-1890s use and ownership period. This entry faces Purchase Street, on the site of the original driveway and "front" entrance to the estate then.

=== Condition ===
The house was reported to be in good condition as at 13 April 2012. There is likely to be an extensive archaeological resource focused mainly on the house and its immediate surrounds. There is also potential for significant evidence to be found within the greater area of the reserve. The archaeology at Hambledon Cottage and grounds has a high archaeological research potential and is likely to be highly intact and of state significance.

Hambledon Cottage is located over a sand body that may have archaeological potential and significance for Aboriginal people. The precise origin of the sand body is not known, but it is thought that the fluvial sand was deposited by the Parramatta River during periods of flooding.

Hambledon Cottage has a good level of intactness, although some of the interior surfaces were replaced with more modern fabric during the 1960s. It is a rare and intact example of an early cottage. The garden retains much of the layouts and species associated with the early colonial period of use. It also has a strong association with the Macarthur family.

The physical archaeological evidence within this area may include built landforms, structural features, intact subfloor deposits, open deposits and scatters, ecological samples and individual artefacts which have potential to yield information relating to major historic themes including Agriculture, Housing, Land Tenure, Persons, Pastoralism and Cultural Sites. Archaeological evidence at this site is likely to be intact. This Archaeological Management Unit is of State significance

=== Modifications and dates ===
- 1959/60 - renovations "almost amounting to reconstruction" were commenced by Parramatta Council. Repair works to the building (including re-rendering, ventilation and foundation reconstruction) are evident.
- 1961 - Garage extension on south side of Coachman's cottage
- 1964 - Extensive interior restoration and refurbishment
- 1981 - Vaulted ceiling of eastern verandah reconstructed following collapse. Ceiling battens installed and hip batten strengthened with steel plate. Fibrous plaster replaced deteriorating lath and plaster
- 1994 - Installation of subsurface drainage system, removal of cement render from external walls and application of sacrificial render to combat rising and falling damp. Replacement of roofing and roof lining on cottage and coachman's cottage.
- 1996 - Further repair and maintenance to roof, eaves, gutters and downpipes
- 2001-02 - Removal of sacrificial render and damp proofing of external walls, replacement of floor joists in members room and bedroom, repairs to chimneys and replacement of columns on eastern verandah.
- 2004-05 - Garden reconstruction based on documentary and test-trench archaeological evidence, to reinstate 19th century driveway, bed formation and removal of several trees not of heritage value.
- 2005 - picket fence with chains swung between fence posts as show in a pre 1854 sketch by HC Allport installed around the reserve facing Hassall Street and Gregory place
- 2006-07 - Replacement of floor joists and repairs to flooring and internal walls in Exhibition Room
- 2009 - Demolition of toilet block on western wall of coachman's cottage
- 2012 - Repairs to front fence and ('Firholme') sandstone and wrought iron gate to Hassall Street damaged by traffic accident.
- c. 2012-14 - Three English oaks (one replacing a removed oak) and four jacarandadas (J. mimosifolia) have been planted on site in this time. The jacarandas are understood to have been planted by a well-meaning neighbour but, as such trees were not on this site until the early 20th century, they are inappropriate and should be removed as the principal period of interpretation is meant to be the 19th century under Macarthur family ownership. One of these jacarandas has been planted far too close to a Norfolk Island hibiscus. Given that the archival record shows that more oaks (possibly up to a dozen) were actually planted across the site, additional oak plantings should be implemented. Protecting new plantings from possum attack is particularly important as existing trees have suffered much such damage.

== Heritage listing ==
Hambledon Cottage, its grounds and associated archaeology have State significance for their important and direct associations with the Macarthurs, one of the most influential families in Australian history as well as other figures of state and local renown.

The house is a fine and rare example of an 1820s domestic building and is expressive of the taste, aspirations and needs of its several owners. Its landscape includes plantings dating from its earliest construction and are now some of Australia's oldest surviving European tree plantings. The Hambledon Cottage site is an important component of an estate (Elizabeth Farm) that became a prototype of Australian land management. It also has strong associations with a number of individuals and families important in the development of Parramatta, New South Wales and Australia, including Thomas Hobbes Scott and Henry Kitchen. The archaeology at Hambledon Cottage and grounds has a high archaeological research potential and is likely to be highly intact and of state significance.

Hambledon Cottage also has significance for its role in illustrating the development of the status of Parramatta, and holds great value for contemporary society for these reasons. The archaeological resource will be able to contribute to more accurately documenting the development, use and life style associated with the cottage, Parramatta and early colonial society.

Hambledon Cottage, Grounds and Archaeology was listed on the New South Wales State Heritage Register on 21 September 2012 having satisfied the following criteria.

The place is important in demonstrating the course, or pattern, of cultural or natural history in New South Wales.

Hambledon Cottage has State historical significance for its close association with the Macarthurs, one of the most prominent and influential families in Australian History. It has particular associations with aspects of the family history, especially the relationship with Penelope Lucas and the impact of John Macarthur's declining health on the family. The cottage contributes to documentation of the use and management of the greater Elizabeth Farm Estate, a prototype for Australian land management. It is one of the earliest surviving houses in Parramatta and NSW. The garden contains elements from several periods of occupation including some from the earliest period of development and contribute to appreciation of the site as a domestic place.

Hambledon Cottage is an important part of a group of colonial era dwellings in Parramatta that include Elizabeth Farm and Experiment Farm. Its later history is representative of the growth of Parramatta through the subdivision of large estates in the later nineteenth century.

The place has a strong or special association with a person, or group of persons, of importance of cultural or natural history of New South Wales's history.

Hambledon Cottage has State significance for its associations with John Macarthur, his Elizabeth Farm Estate, his wife Elizabeth, their son Edward and early Australian architect and rival to Francis Greenway, Henry Kitchen. It also has associations with significant such figures such as Archdeacon Thomas Hobbes Scott, Penelope Lucas, Dr Matthew Anderson and local settlers such as Francis John Wickham.

The place is important in demonstrating aesthetic characteristics and/or a high degree of creative or technical achievement in New South Wales.

Hambledon Cottage has State aesthetic significance as a fine and rare colonial era cottage, the plan configuration of which is very intact and which has retained a relatively large amount of fine early fabric. It has significance as a part of the Macarthur's Elizabeth Farm Estate and because of its setting, which contains trees planted by the Macarthur family, views and vistas to Elizabeth Farm's surviving early tree plantings, nearby Experiment Farm cottage's estate, and the Queen's Wharf precinct on Parramatta River.

The Hambledon Cottage landscape has state significance as an important and appropriate setting for what was an important private residence. It includes some of the oldest exotic tree plantings in Australia whose layout demonstrates the application of European influences to the local scene and the living style of colonial society at the time. They have great aesthetic significance due to their likely design by the important early Australian architect Henry Kitchen.

The design of the wooded landscape associated with Hambledon Cottage achieves a unity of scale and balance of form that complement the architecture of the house. Landscape works carried out around Hambledon in the later 20th century are less significant but nonetheless demonstrate more recent approaches to amenity planting associated with local government conservation action.

The place has strong or special association with a particular community or cultural group in New South Wales for social, cultural or spiritual reasons.

The acquisition of the cottage by council and its subsequent history has State social significance as an illustration of the growing appreciation of the role of historic sites in the community that commenced in the mid twentieth century and is today reflected in the number of tourists which visit the site. It has local social significance for its strong associations with the contemporary community of Parramatta where it is a local landmark.

The place has potential to yield information that will contribute to an understanding of the cultural or natural history of New South Wales.

The landscape of Hambledon has State significance for its potential to yield information that will contribute to an understanding of NSW's cultural history. The garden and grounds have a considerable archaeological, educational and interpretive potential as a resource for the study of subjects such as architecture, design, social history, landscape architecture and horticulture for present and future generations of Australians and has high archaeological research potential. The cottage is an important educational resource because of the place it occupies in the development of Australian colonial architecture, its early fabric demonstrating construction and joinery techniques from the beginning of the nineteenth century.

The archaeology at Hambledon Cottage and grounds has high archaeological research potential and is likely to be highly intact and of State significance. The physical archaeological evidence within this area may include built landforms, structural features, intact subfloors deposits, open deposits and scatters, ecological samples and individual artefacts which have potential to yield information relating to major historic themes including Agriculture, Housing, Land Tenure, Persons, Pastoralism and Cultural Sites.

The Hambledon Cottage site contains a section of a sand body, thought to be deposited by the Parramatta River during periods of flood. From a geomorphic perspective, the sandbody has the potential to provide insight into patterns of river flow and flood events that could lead to a better understanding of the formation of the Parramatta River Valley. Excavation of sections of sand body on George Street, Parramatta have uncovered archaeological artefacts and deposits associated with Aboriginal people occupying the Parramatta area prior to the arrival of non-Aboriginal settlers. The section of sand body location on the site of Hambledon Cottage and Garden may have the potential to provide insight into the diet and lifestyle of Aboriginal People living in Parramatta and more broadly the Cumberland Plain.

The place possesses uncommon, rare or endangered aspects of the cultural or natural history of New South Wales.

Hambledon Cottage has State significance as a rare example of an early nineteenth century cottage that is representative of a particular class of society, their tastes and means and is a particularly fine example of its type. By virtue of its early date of construction, historical associations and surviving landscape elements, the landscape of Hambledon also has rarity value. Many of the plants in the garden have high landscape architectural value and ornamental qualities. Some of the trees are among the oldest exotic plantings in NSW and Australia. The Osage orange tree (Maclura pomifera) is a very rare surviving specimen in Sydney, of a species once common on rural estate hedgerows.

The place is important in demonstrating the principal characteristics of a class of cultural or natural places/environments in New South Wales.

Hambledon Cottage has representative value at a State level for its ability to demonstrate a class of early nineteenth century domestic building. The garden at Hambledon also has State significance at a representative level for its ability to demonstrate colonial cultural landscapes developed by the wealthy early European settlers, particularly in the use of European horticultural practices and the planting of exotic tree species such as English oak (Quercus robur), cork oak (Q.suber) and indigenous species such as hoop pine (Araucaria cunninghamiana), Bunya pine (A.bidwillii) and Port Jackson figs (Ficus rubiginosa). The mixed planting of deciduous and evergreen trees and shrubs, together with the vistas and views have produced a landscape with considerable character, which is now in stark contrast with the garden's more developed urban surroundings.

== See also ==
- Australian residential architectural styles
