= Babworth House =

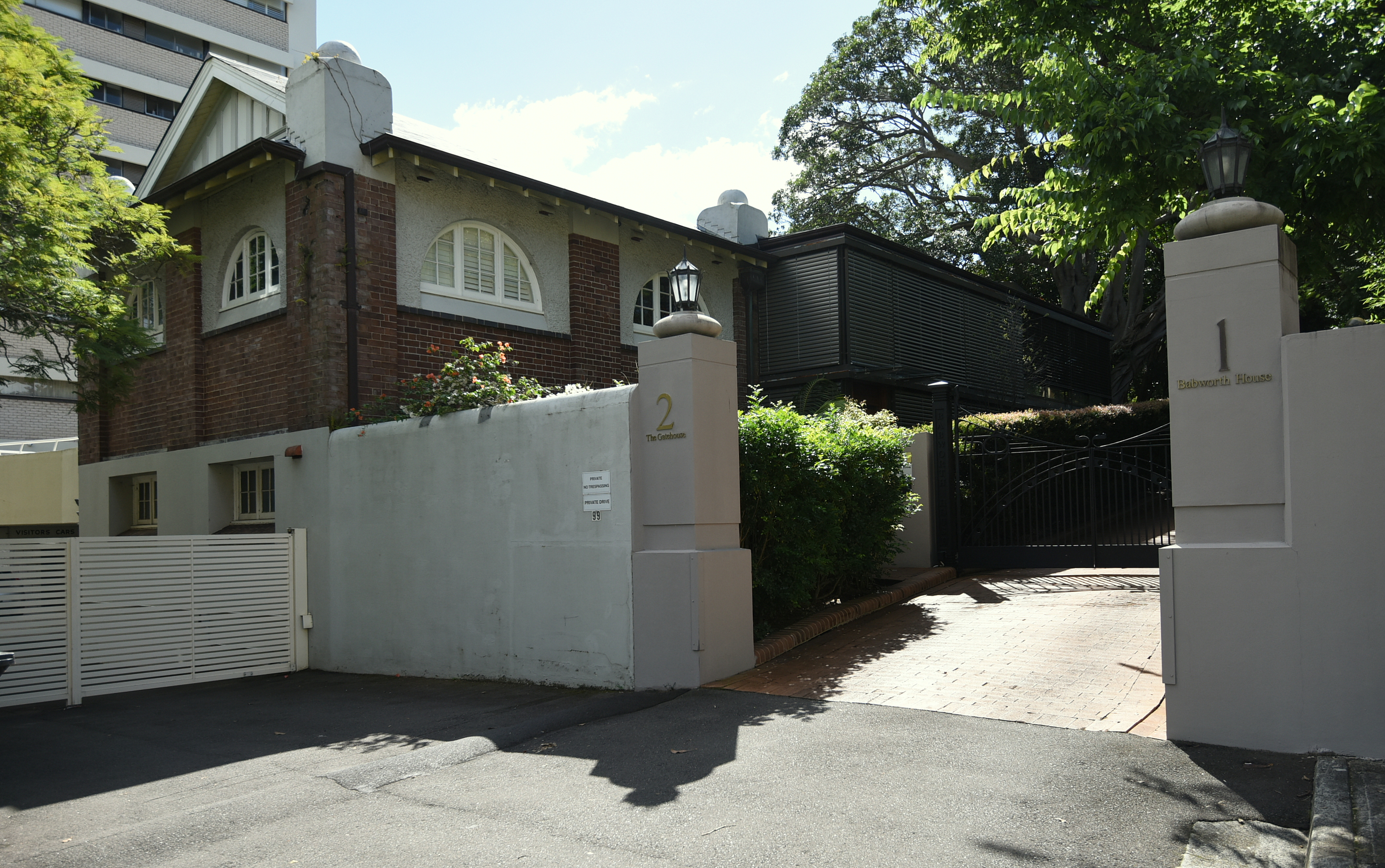
- Babworth House, Mount Adelaide Street gates, pictured in 2014

- Location within Sydney Location within Australia
- 33°52′19″S 151°14′20″E
- Location: 103 Darling Point Road, Darling Point, Sydney, Australia

History
- Built: 1912–1915

Site notes
- Architects: Mortimer Lewis; Edmund Blacket; Morrow and De Putron
- Architectural style: Federation Arts and Crafts

New South Wales Heritage Register
- Official name: Babworth House; Mount Adelaide (site of) (demolished)
- Type: State heritage (built)
- Designated: 13 August 1999
- Reference no.: 1300
- Type: House
- Category: Residential buildings (private)
- Builders: Messrs W. Gawne and Son

Babworth House is a heritage-listed former residence and school and now staff accommodation at 103 Darling Point Road, Darling Point, Sydney, Australia. It was designed in various stages by Mortimer Lewis, Edmund Blacket, and Morrow and De Putron and built from 1912 to 1915 by Messrs W. Gawne and Son. It is also known as Mount Adelaide. The property is privately owned. It was added to the New South Wales State Heritage Register on 13 August 1999.

== History ==
=== Early colonial history ===
Originally known by its Aboriginal name Yarranabbee, this suburb on the south side of Sydney Harbour was called Mrs Darling's Point in honour of his wife by Ralph Darling, the Colonial Governor of New South Wales from 1825 to 1831. At that time, the area was heavily timbered; however, after New South Head Road was built in 1831, timber cutters felled many of the trees, and the land was subdivided. Most of the plots, covering 3.6 to 6.1 hectares (9 to 15 acres) in this area, were taken up between 1833 and 1838. The "Mrs" was lost from the name and the suburb and point became Darling Point.

In 1833, "Villa allotments" were advertised for sale at 'Mrs Darling's Point'. The land was auctioned on 11 October and the largest allotment No. 10, 5 hectares (13 acres) on the eastern side of the point was purchased by William Macdonald, an emancipist who was transported for life for forgery. Macdonald had become a successful businessman and entrepreneur, dealing in general hardware. Macdonald named his purchase Mount Adelaide and spent considerable amounts of money on it, although no residence had been built by the time he put it up for sale in 1837.

In the 1830s (1833–37), Macdonald was responsible for a considerable amount of landscaping including the planting of a vineyard on the Mount Adelaide estate, part of which is the site of what is now Wiston Gardens, including numbers 4 and 6. The vineyard was reputedly designed by Thomas Shepherd, the first nurseryman and landscape designer in the colony. The Mount Adelaide Estate was extensively sub-divided between the time Macdonald departed for England in 1837 and the turn of the century.

=== Thomas Shepherd ===
Thomas Shepherd (c. 1779–1835), a landscape gardener and nursery proprietor, was NSW's first nurseryman, the first early writer and teacher on landscape design in the colony, and one of the main proponents of vine cultivation in this period. His father was Principal Gardener to the Earl of Crawford and Lindesay at his property Struthers, where the young Thomas received his earliest horticultural education. He then trained in all aspects of landscape gardening and worked for the practice of Thomas White before setting himself up as a practising landscape gardener in both Scotland and England. In his English work he came in contact with Humphry Repton, a noted landscape gardener, and in his writing criticised some of Repton's methods. Shepherd eventually established a nursery at Hackney to support his business. Widowed (c. 1821–22) and then remarried (1823) and faced with an unprofitable landscape and nursery business in the period after 1815 at the end of the Napoleonic Wars, he took a position with the New Zealand company. As Principal Superintendent he was charged with establishment of a colony on Stewart Island, New Zealand, with the intention of cultivating flax (Phormium tenax).

With a band of colonists, mainly Scots, he sailed in 1825 with his new wife Jane Sarah (née Henderson) and young family for the South Pacific. Unsuccessful in finding a suitable place for a settlement either in Stewart Island or the rest of New Zealand, they arrived in Sydney in early 1827. With encouragement from Governor Darling, he established the first commercial nursery garden in Australia near Grose Farm (1827) (today's suburb of Chippendale/Darlington, and adjacent to what is now the University of Sydney and Victoria Park). He named his nursery the Darling Nursery in honour of his patron. Progress was difficult because of the unprepared nature of the land allocated and he began with a vegetable garden. This was gradually expanded into the Darling Nursery with help of stock from Sydney Botanic Gardens, as well as from Colonial Secretary Alexander Macleay at Elizabeth Bay House and his son William Macarthur at Camden Park. Little is known of his landscaping work but, having established himself in the colony, Shepherd gave two sets of lectures at Sydney Mechanics' School of Arts during 1834–35, for which (in their published form) he is now chiefly remembered.

Shepherd's first published writings were on viticulture (1831) and he was an early supporter of James Busby, a viticultural promoter, educator, and patron. Shepherd's "Lectures on the Horticulture of New South Wales" (1835) addressed practical matters, such as the growing of vegetables in a colony with a different climate and soils to those of Britain and complete turnabout of the seasons. The vital need for water in hot Sydney summers was also stressed in this, Australia's first garden book. 'Lectures on Landscape Gardening in Australia (1836) of which only the first was able to be delivered due to Shepherd's death, was the first Australian book to address garden design, and preceded by five years the first major North American text on landscape gardening by Andrew Jackson Downing. At first sight conservative in their aesthetics, the lectures drew rhetorically on the Brownian tradition of the English landscape garden, albeit tempered by local circumstance and contemporary thought. Shepherd deplored the indiscriminate destruction of timber and instead advocated selective thinning and tasteful arrangement and disposition of exotic trees to create "pleasing effects (and) ...improved scenery". He addressed a range of garden styles – Sublime, Picturesque, and Beautiful – an inclusive approach in a colony of only modest population. His advice on education for young gardeners had strong overtones of publisher and writer, John Claudius Loudon, and many of the later lectures borrowed from his writings.

William McDonald's Mount Adelaide estate (1833–37) is the only known landscape design that can confidently be attributed to Thomas Shepherd – a terraced vineyard at Double Bay overlooking an ornamental fishpond with Sydney Harbour as a backdrop.

=== Mount Adelaide estate ===
The site has identified archaeological potential for relics associated with the significant 1830s vineyard prior to its subdivision and construction of both Lewis' 1838+ house and subsequent additions, its demolition and construction of Babworth House between 1912 and 1915. The estate (and its subdivisions, such as 4 & 6 Wiston Gardens to the east and downhill) are significant for their association with Shepherd and through hims with contemporary theories of aesthetics in landscaping and picturesque design and to demonstrate aspects of the cultivation of the vine and the design, layout and construction of a vineyard of the 1830s. The potential for substantive remains is limited as a result of the major changes to the site of the vineyard through subdivision and housing construction. Building and garden making by Lewis and later the Hordern family may have removed much of the potential archaeological remains of Mt. Adelaide's landscaping (e.g. vineyard terraces and fishpond) from the 1830s.

A major purchaser of Macdonald's land was Mortimer Lewis, the Colonial Architect. Lewis constructed a house on the northernmost edge of the Mount Adelaide estate taking advantage of views of the harbour. The main feature of Lewis' simple but elegant design was the semicircular bay window of the drawing room, a feature of Lewis' other work at Fernhill, Mulgoa and Richmond Villa. Burdened with mortgage commitments in the difficult financial conditions of the depression of the 1840s, Lewis filed his Insolvency Schedule in November 1849.

In 1849, John Croft, a businessman and partner with T. W. Smith in the firm of Smith, Croft & Co. purchased Mount Adelaide. By 1857 when the house was again up for sale, it had not only been finished but apparently enlarged and changes made to the outbuildings. Henry Mort purchased Mount Adelaide in 1858. After years of living in Mount Adelaide House and coping with its limited facilities, it was only as his family was diminishing in size that Henry decided to make substantial additions to the house. These were designed by Edmund Blacket (now in practice with his son Cyril as Blacket & Son) who had first made the house habitable after it had been left unfinished by Mortimer Lewis. Due to financial problems in September 1893 Mort transferred his Mount Adelaide property to his daughter Eliza and his eldest son Henry Wallace Mort. From 1893 to 1910 Mount Adelaide house was let and the grounds were gradually reduced by subdivision.

=== Hordern family ===
Anthony (1788–1869) and Ann (1791–1871) Hordern established the retailing dynasty Anthony Hordern & Sons in 1823 and became very wealthy. They, and their descendants, owned and built many large, important heritage listed properties in Sydney and the NSW Southern Highlands.

In 1910, their great-grandson Sir Samuel Hordern (1879–1956) purchased Mount Adelaide and demolished the old house. Between 1912–1915 he built a grand 2 storey home, "Babworth House", designed by architectural firm Morrow and De Putron.

A brief description in the Sydney Morning Herald gave some idea about the character of the new house: 'The building, which will contain about 40 rooms including a magnificent billiard room will be finished with the most up-to-date appointments and all the latest labour saving devices. The furnishings throughout will be of the richest character. The joiner's work will be in English oak, cedar and Queensland maple, highly polished. The plaster enrichments will be on a lavish scale and everything will be worked pout in special details. The design throughout will be in modern Renaissance, and when complete the building should be one of the finest residences in Sydney.'

The estimated cost of the work was from A£30,000–40,000. The house was on a grand scale with high quality finishes. It appears that it was not until 1915 that Samuel Hordern and his family took up residence in their new home, called Babworth House. Its style and location were sure marks of a class of commercial entrepreneurs which had established itself as part of the Sydney social elite.

The Hordern family, descendants of Anthony (1788–1869) and Ann Hordern, who established a Sydney retailing dynasty exemplified by Anthony Hordern & Sons Palace Emporium, created many celebrated gardens around their residences. One of Anthony Hordern's sons was Samuel Hordern (1849–1909). His eldest son, (Sir) Samuel Hordern (1879–1956) acquired Mount Adelaide on the Darling Point ridge and created a vast new residence and landscaped setting in an Arts and Crafts style (c. 1912): formal stairways descended from the porte cochere to sunken gardens and grottoes distinguished by an important botanic collection. Known as Babworth House, this great estate was designed by the architectural firm of Morrow and De Putron, which also designed nearby Hopewood House (1914) for his brother Lebbeus. Sir Samuel also resided at Retford Park, Bowral; Lady Hordern took a keen interest in both gardens. The site was graded to form a series of garden platforms and enclosures descending to a rose garden, herbaceous border, and oak glade under-planted with bluebells.

The furnishings of Babworth House, like the house itself, reflected an eclectic choice of style and period but of high quality, a mixture of antique and reproduction furniture and ornaments, much of it purchased overseas. From the onset of his father's last illness in 1906 until 1926 when the company was sold to private investors, Samuel II was the governing director of Anthony Hordern and Sons. Despite his many commitments to the family business and associated boards and organisations, he was also active in recreational and sporting pursuits, agricultural interests and philanthropic causes.

=== Use as a hospital and nurses' quarters ===
Following Sir Samuel Hordern's death in 1956, the contents of Babworth House were sold by the auctioneers, Lawson's. The pasturalist Major Harold de Vahl Rubin purchased Babworth House with the mind for using it as a private hospital and a Remembrance Trust was established. The Woollahra Council refused permission for the use of the site for a hospital on the basis that it was a proclaimed residential area. The matter went to the NSW Land and Valuation Court where a compromise was reached whereby zero point six one hectares (one point five acres) of land was subdivided for residential purposes but the hospital was allowed to use Babworth House for a convalescent hospital. The first stage of works for the conversion of Babworth House for use as a convalescent hospital was drafted by the Government Architect's Branch of public Works in 1959 and provided accommodation for 30 patients. From 1961 until 1980, Babworth House was used as an after-care unit of St Vincent's Hospital.

In 1979, the NSW Government announced a radical rationalisation of hospital accommodation resulting in the closure of Babworth House as an after-care unit. Following the closure, a range of options was considered for the use of Babworth House; between 1981 and 1985, the house remained essentially unoccupied. During this period the site was used as a location for two films, Kitty and the Bagman and Careful He Might Hear You. In 1985, the Trustees of St Vincent's agreed that Babworth House would be made available for the relocation of the Sacred Heart Hospice during the estimated three-year period in which a new hospice was built in Darlinghurst. The hospice moved patients into Babworth house in July 1986. When it vacated, the site plans were drawn up in December 1989 for the conversion of Babworth house into nurses' accommodation.

=== Conversion into residential property ===
In 2000 the property was purchased by developers for $5.2 million (AUD) and over the next 10 years the original Babworth House was adapted into five luxury residential apartments, 4 in the main house and the fifth in the servants quarters/cellar (1/1 - 1/5 Mount Adelaide Street Darling Point NSW). The rest of the property was subdivided and new dwellings with roof gardens were constructed in its lower grounds. The former gabled brick and slate roof garage was converted into the "Gatehouse" residence. (Case Study 24)

== Description ==
=== Grounds ===
One of Anthony Hordern's sons was Samuel Hordern (1849–1909). His eldest son, (Sir) Samuel Hordern (1879–1956), acquired Mount Adelaide on the Darling Point ridge and created a vast new residence and landscaped setting in an Arts and Crafts style (c. 1912): formal stairways descended from the porte cochere to sunken gardens and grottoes distinguished by an important botanic collection. Known as Babworth House (or Hall), this great estate was designed by architects Morrow and De Putron, who also designed nearby Hopewood House (1914) on the point for his brother Lebbeus. Sir Samuel also resided at Retford Park, Bowral; Lady (Charlotte) Hordern took a keen interest in both gardens. The site was graded to form a series of garden platforms and enclosures descending to a rose garden, herbaceous border, and oak glade under-planted with bluebells.

As with the house, the garden also displays a certain stylistic eclecticism: Italianate garden terrace balustrading and cypress-lined walks; highly sculptured faux rockwork walls and grottoes clad in an array of succulents and rock garden plants; the use of palms and clumps of umbrella tree (Schefflera actinophylla) and bird-of-paradise flower (Strelitzia sp.) to give an exuberant and tropical character to parts of the garden; the retention of areas with a strong nineteenth sombreness and richly varies plant list throughout the estate.

=== House ===
Babworth House is sited on the highest point of the Darling Point peninsula. The house is two storey with walls finished in finely worked, unpainted, cement render with beautifully detailed Art Nouveau-inspired decorations around openings and chimneys. A series of very crisp and precise indented lines surround the house, adding strength and balance to the numerous and varied openings, balconies and other architectural elements. The house asymmetrical with broad gabled areas juxtaposed with bold projecting covered balconies, some with bowed or circular fronts. The east, north and west elevations are each different but use the same architectural language and decoration.

The joinery is all timber with french doors generally containing tapered glass panels. The windows are usually double hung with single panes to the lower sash and six panes to the upper sash. The eaves are broad with ventilated soffits supported on tapered timber brackets or joists. The roof is broken into many parts and covered with slate, mostly with terracotta ridges and occasionally copper. The guttering, rainwater heads and downpipes are all in copper and of consistent detail designed especially for the house.

Internally, the house displays a variety of architectural styles, from Edwardian, Classical Revival to Art Nouveau and early Art Deco. The ground floor principal rooms comprise entry hall, stair hall, dining room, drawing room, ballroom/billiard room with attached bays and attached library/smoking room. All of these, with the exception of the drawing room, are heavily paneled in English oak and Queensland maple with finely detailed door cases and beamed ceilings. The plaster ceiling panels between the beams show bold Art Nouveau decoration and in the main rooms the ceilings show a subtle curve down towards the wall around the perimeter.

The drawing room is entirely painted, even though it contains extensive areas of carved timber. Walls are paneled in a Classical Revival manner, reminiscent of the eighteenth and early nineteenth centuries with carved door cases and a strongly articulated dado. The alcove to the fireplace is entered through a large columned opening and contains a fine white and green serpentine marble chimneypiece.

The stair is heavily carved in the Art Nouveau style with large newel posts at each change of direction. The lower posts now support modern white ball light fittings.

The other ground-floor rooms display varying degrees of lesser decoration down to the minimal work in the south-west servants' wing.

The principal bedroom and dressing room are finished in a similar but simpler manner to the drawing room and without the wall paneling. The other rooms show clear differentiation between family/guest use and servants' use in their scale and detail. The hospital use has introduced a lift adjacent to the ballroom and an upgraded dumb waiter adjacent to the kitchen. The joinery, including door and window hardware has been moved around in many instances.

=== Condition ===
As at 1 July 1999, the physical condition is excellent.

Although Macdonald did not build a house on the site in the 1930s, he was responsible for a considerable amount of landscaping including the planting of a vineyard on the site of what is now Wiston Gardens, including No. 4. The vineyard was reputedly designed by Thomas Shepherd, the first nurseryman and landscape designer in the colony. The Mount Adelaide Estate was extensively sub-divided between the time Macdonald departed for England in 1837 and the turn of the century.

The site has identified archaeological potential for relics associated with the significant 1830s vineyard of the Mount Adelaide Estate located on this site prior to its subdivision and construction of the subject house. These potential relics have been assessed as significant for the following reasons:

- For their association with Thomas Shepherd, the first nurseryman, the first early writer and teacher on landscape design in NSW, first nurseryman and one of the main proponents of vine cultivation in this period.
- For their association with William Macdonald, an ex-convict who became a wealthy entrepreneur.
- For their association with contemporary theories of aesthetics in landscaping and picturesque design.
- For their ability to demonstrate aspects of the cultivation of the vine and the design, layout and construction of a vineyard of the 1830s.

The potential for substantive is remains is limited as a result of the major changes to the site of the vineyard (through subdivision and housing construction).

=== Modifications and dates ===
The following modifications have been made:

- 1833 – 13 acres 3 rods to McDonald
- 1830s – vineyard terracing on eastern side of Mt. Adelaide Estate for McDonald, possibly by Thomas Shepherd (the only documented landscape design of Shepherd's)
- 1837+ – Mortimer Lewis house with bay window on the northernmost edge of the estate
- By 1857 – house had been enlarged, finished and changes had been made to its outbuildings
- 1858+ – substantial additions by E. T. Blacket for Mort
- 1893–1910 – grounds reduced by subdivision
- 1912–1915 – old house pulled down and large new mansion built by Morrow & de Putron for Samuel Hordern II.

== Heritage listing ==
As at 7 June 1999, Babworth House was one of the largest, finest and most intact examples of an early twentieth century grand house in Australia. It is of national significance both historically and aesthetically. Babworth House is an example of the Federation Arts and Crafts style in grand domestic architecture in Australia. The quality and uniqueness of the exterior and interior detailing, incorporating both Art Nouveau and neoclassical motifs and forms is of a standard and scale rarely seen in domestic architecture. The workmanship and detailing of the external cement render work is of national significance technically.

Babworth's garden is an integral part of the design for the whole estate and, although the estate is reduced in size, the gardens and grounds provide a substantially intact and highly appropriate setting to the grand mansion. The built garden elements such as stairs, balustrades, grottoes and faux-rockwork amplify the scale of the mansion and demonstrate high technical accomplishment by using the same high standard of construction as the house.

The Babworth estate, including house, garden and outbuildings, is representative of the large villa estate established by the wealthy elite of Darling Point during the nineteenth and early twentieth centuries. It demonstrates an affluence and lifestyle which could only be supported by a very large range of live-in servants and which was rare following the First World War.

Babworth House was built as the home of Sir Samuel Hordern, a fourth generation member of the notable Sydney Commercial family who founded the famous Anthony Hordern's stores. Sir Samuel was a well-known and influential member of Sydney society. Babworth represents the continuing association of the Hordern family with Darling Point from 1864 through to 1956.

The garden is a major extant private collection of plants dating from the nineteenth and early twentieth century. It also contains various plants which are rare or otherwise uncommon in cultivation in Sydney as well as rare indigenous species that have persisted since before site development.

Babworth House was listed on the New South Wales State Heritage Register on 13 August 1999 having satisfied the following criteria.

The place is important in demonstrating the course, or pattern, of cultural or natural history in New South Wales.

The place is historically significant as the site of the nineteenth century house Mt Adelaide, reported by several to have been one of the finest houses in Sydney at the time, as well as the site of Babworth house, probably the finest house built in Sydney during the twentieth century. Babworth House was built as the home of Sir Samuel Hordern, a fourth generation member of the notable Sydney Commercial family who founded the famous Anthony Hordern's stores. Sir Samuel was a well-known and influential member of Sydney society. Babworth represents the continuing association of the Hordern family with Darling Point from 1864 through to 1956. The Mt Adelaide and Babworth estates have associations with significant architects of the nineteenth and early twentieth century. There is evidence of

The place is important in demonstrating aesthetic characteristics and a high degree of creative or technical achievement in New South Wales.

The house incorporated both Art Nouveau and neoclassical motifs and forms is of a standard and scale rarely seen in domestic architecture. The workmanship and detailing of the external cement render work is of national significance technically. Babworth's garden is an integral part of the design for the whole estate and, although the estate is reduced in size, the gardens and grounds provide a substantially intact and highly appropriate setting to the grand mansion. The built garden elements such as stairs, balustrades, grottoes and faux-rockwork amplify the scale of the mansion and demonstrate high technical accomplishment by using the same high standard of construction as the house.

The Babworth estate has a strong or special association with a particular community or cultural group in New South Wales for social, cultural or spiritual reasons.

The Babworth estate, including house, garden and outbuildings, is representative of the large villa estate established by the wealthy elite of Darling Point during the nineteenth and early twentieth centuries. It demonstrates an affluence and lifestyle which could only be supported by a very large range of live-in servants and which was rare following the First World War.

The Babworth estate has potential to yield information that will contribute to an understanding of the cultural or natural history of New South Wales.

The garden is a major extant private collection of plants dating from the nineteenth and early twentieth century. It also contains various plants which are rare or otherwise uncommon in cultivation in Sydney as well as rare indigenous species that have persisted since before site development.

The place possesses uncommon, rare or endangered aspects of the cultural or natural history of New South Wales.

Babworth House is a rare example of the Federation Arts and Crafts style in grand domestic architecture in Australia.

== See also ==
- Australian residential architectural styles
- Hordern family
