= Riversdale, Goulburn =

Riversdale
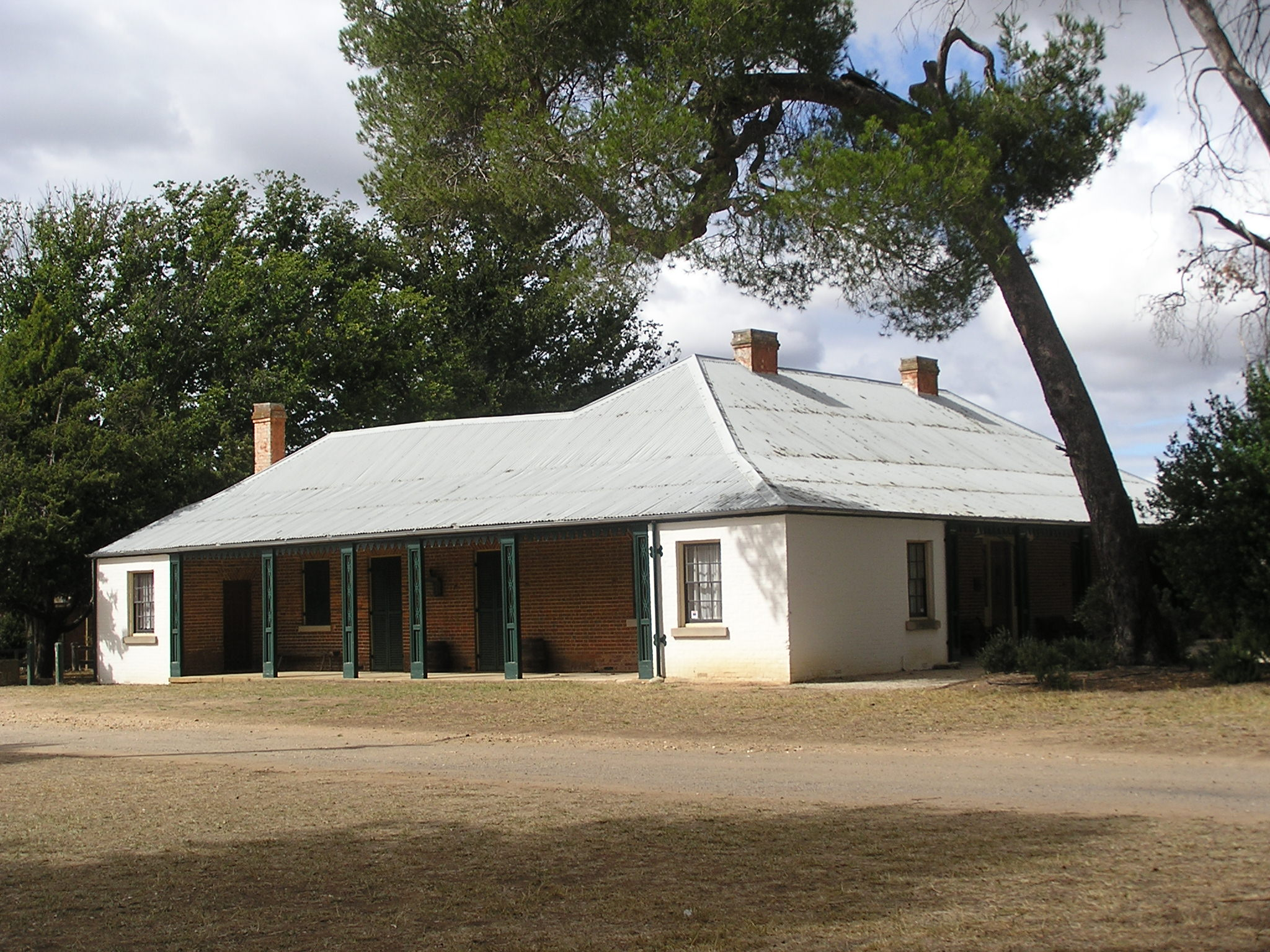
- Riversdale

- Location within New South Wales

General information
- Type: House
- Architectural style: Early colonial Regency
- Location: Maud Street, Goulburn, New South Wales, Australia
- Coordinates: 34°44′06″S 149°44′18″E
- Estimated completion: c. 1840s
- Owner: National Trust of Australia

Design and construction
- Main contractor: John Richards

New South Wales Heritage Register
- Official name: Riversdale
- Criteria: a., c., e., f., g.
- Designated: 1 March 2002
- Reference no.: 01504

Riversdale is a heritage-listed house in the early colonial Regency style located in Goulburn, New South Wales, Australia. The house was built in about 1840 and some of the outbuildings were constructed even earlier. The house is listed on the New South Wales State Heritage Register and the property is owned by the National Trust of Australia. It was added to the New South Wales State Heritage Register on 1 March 2002.

== History ==
=== Riversdale as a coaching inn ===
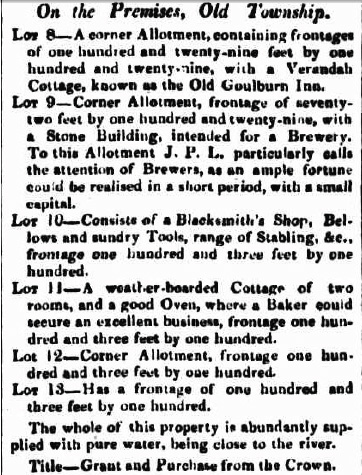
Advertisement placed in 1837 by Matthew Healy for the property which is now known as Riversdale.

The land on which Riversdale was built was originally owned by Matthew Healey who ran a small hotel on the property called the Old Goulburn Inn. In 1837 Healey sold a large amount of his Goulburn assets so that he could retire to Appin. He placed an advertisement in The Sydney Herald in 1837 which gives a good description of the Inn (which was demolished) and surrounding buildings that were present at this time (see picture of advertisement on right).

John Richards bought the property and built Riversdale as a coaching inn (then called the Victoria Inn) in about 1840. He died before it was opened and his wife Ann took control of all of his businesses. She placed the property in a trust for her sons. In 1840 she married Benjamin Gould.

The first licensee of the inn was Louis Levy and Benjamin Gould held the licence from 1843 after him. Their names are still painted on the stonework entrance archway to Riversdale. A story in the Sydney Morning Herald of July 1842 recounts the concern that Benjamin Gould had about the safety of the nearby bridge which crossed the Wollondilly River. The newspaper article said that he had repeatedly tried to repair the bridge himself and when the river flooded he took travellers over on horseback. On one occasion a traveller had drowned and he and Levy were trying to find the body. Later in the same year The Sydney Morning Herald published how Gould and other men from the inn had rescued passengers from the Sydney mail coach which was attempting to cross the river when both horses fell through the bridge.

=== Riversdale as Goulburn Grammar School ===
From about 1850 until 1856 Riversdale was rented by David Patterson as a boarding school for boys called Goulburn Grammar School. David Patterson was previously the Headmaster of Sydney College but in 1849 decided to go to Goulburn to establish his own school. He was remembered by one former pupil as "a splendid man and a great scholar" who had the gift of imparting knowledge to others and although he was strict he was kind hearted.

Shortly before David Patterson left Riversdale an advertisement appeared in The Sydney Morning Herald for the sale of the building. The ad gives a colourful description of the property as it was in 1855.

"A substantial and extensive premises known as the Goulburn Grammar School and consisting of commodious dwelling-house containing 13 rooms and 2 extensive cellars and spacious flagged verandah, back and front; large kitchen and pantry adjoining, with loft and bedroom above; seven stall brick stable with two coach-houses and loft the whole length of the building capable of containing fifteen tons of hay.

Seven-stall stone stable with large store-room adjoining and loft the whole length of the building partitioned and capable of containing ten tons of hay and a thousand bushels of grain. Excellent garden of about an acre, well stocked with fruit trees.

The whole is securely fenced and there is the convenience of a bricked well of pure water on the premises."

The property was sold to Thomas Bowen who in the following year sold it to Henry Wilson and the place again became an inn called the Criterion Hotel. He sold it later to John Fulljames who used the house as a residence only.

=== The Fulljames family ===
Marriage notice in the Sydney Morning Herald in 1862 referring to the property as Riversdale.

John Fulljames was born in 1818. He came to Sydney as chief steward on his uncle's ship and stayed in the colony. In 1840 he married Elizabeth Smyth and established a stock agency in Goulburn shortly afterwards. John also owned the property called Cogenburgh at Bungonia. The couple had a large family. Two of their daughters Emily and Rachel married into the Badgery family. (see photos below).

It seems that the Fulljames family resided at Riversdale from the early 1860s. A mention is made in the Sydney Morning Herald in 1861 that John had grown a prize apple at his house in the Old Township of Goulburn. The first reference to the property being called Riversdale was in 1862 when a marriage notice (see picture on right) for the eldest daughter Emily was placed in the Sydney Morning Herald by John Fulljames. It appears therefore that it was the Fulljames family that named Riversdale.

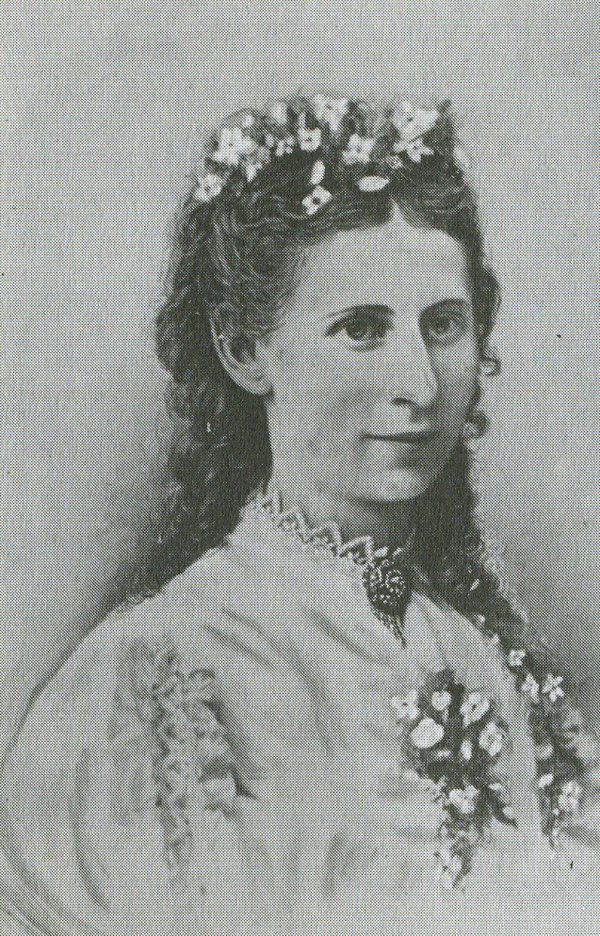
Emily Fulljames circa 1860 daughter of John Fulljames. Later married John Badgery.

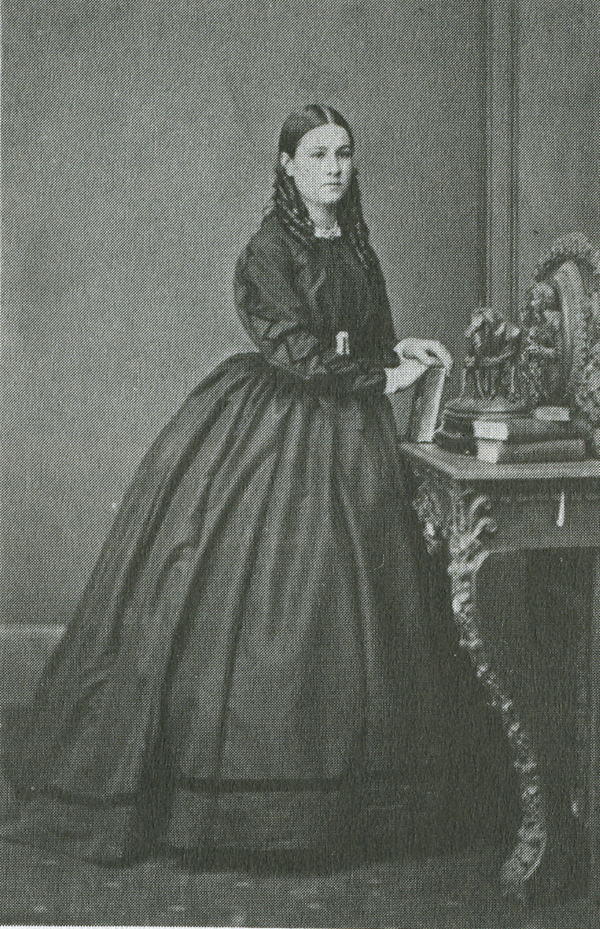
Rebecca Fulljames circa 1860 daughter of John Fulljames. Later married Andrew Badgery.

=== The Twynam family ===
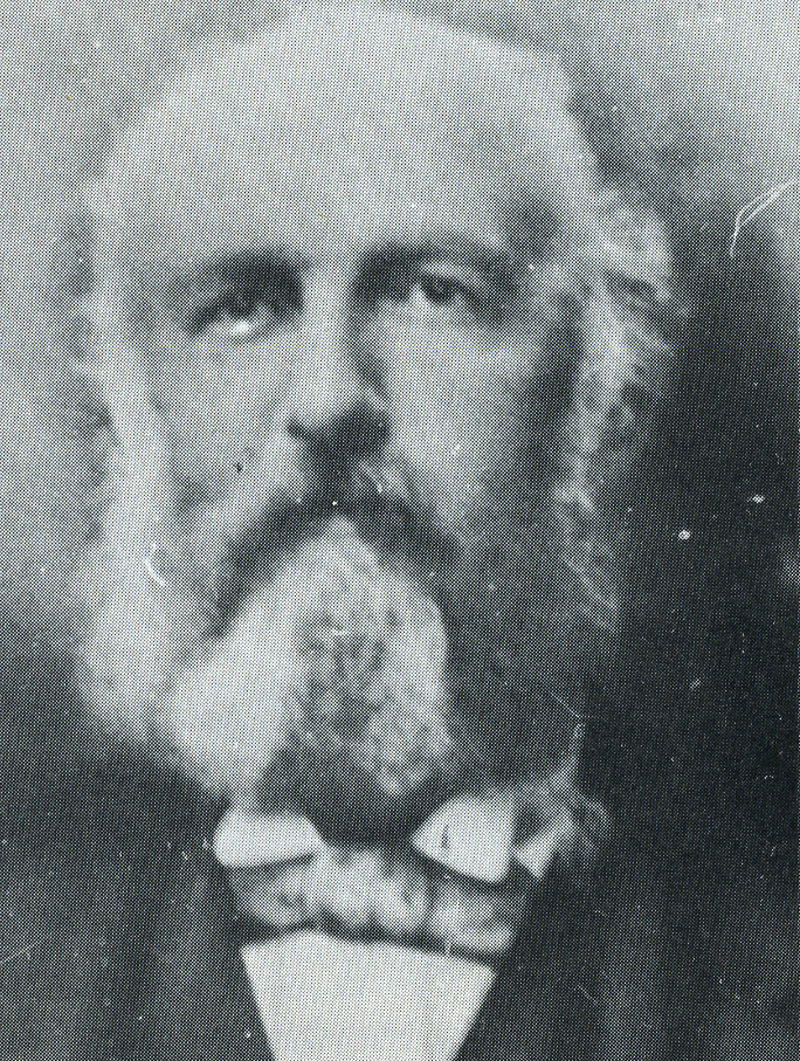
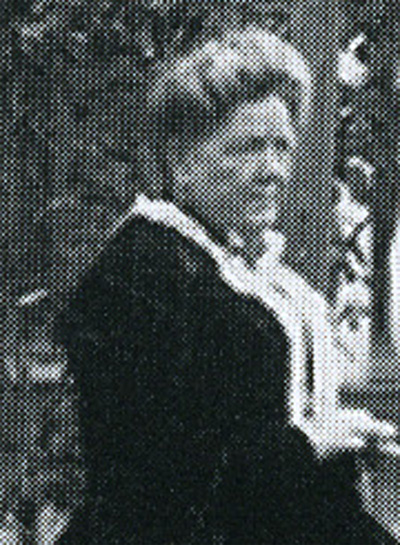
Edward Twynam and Emily Rose Twynam

The Twynam family bought Riversdale in 1875 after leasing it for several years. Edward Twynam was born in 1832 in Bishopstoke, Hampshire, England and came to Australia when he was 23. He obtained employment as an assistant surveyor soon after he arrived in Sydney and during his career he carried out many important surveys into the interior of New South Wales. In 1888 he became the Surveyor-General of New South Wales and remained in this position until 1900.

He came to live in Goulburn in 1864 and two years later in 1866 married Emily Rose Bolton. Emily Rose was born in 1845. She was one of nine children of the Reverend Robert Thorley Bolton and Jane Martha Ball. Her elder sister was Lady Mary Windeyer who became famous as a suffragette and charity worker.

Emily was interested in art and craft and many of her works still remain. She was very competent in woodcarving, embroidery and drawing. In 1893 she won a prize for her embroidery at the Chicago International Exhibition. More than 130 drawings of plants birds and lizards survive in her sketchbooks. She carved furniture and picture frames with botanical themes some of which are displayed at Riversdale.

Emily died in 1910 and Edward died at the age of 91 in 1923. After his death their two unmarried daughters Edith (see photo below) and Alice Joan who was a nursing sister lived at Riversdale. In 1939 after the death of her husband Phoebe Wesche (see photo below), another daughter, joined them. All three sisters lived at Riversdale for the rest of their lives. When the youngest sister Alice Joan died in 1967 the property was sold to the National Trust of Australia and it is still owned and operated by them today.

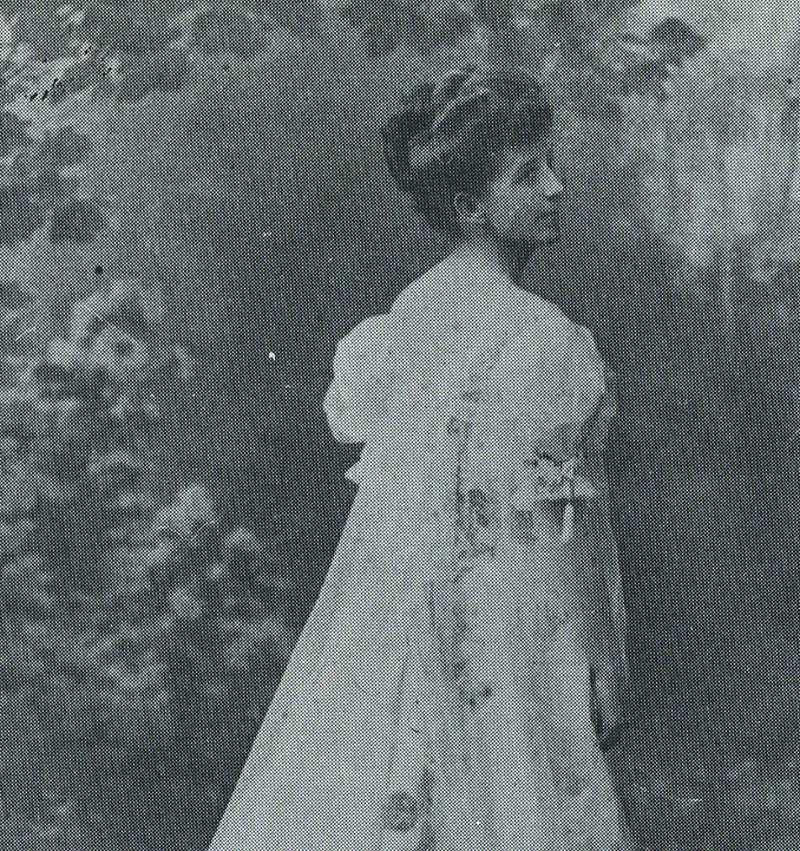
Mary Twynam (married name Mary Cunningham), daughter of Edward Twynam.

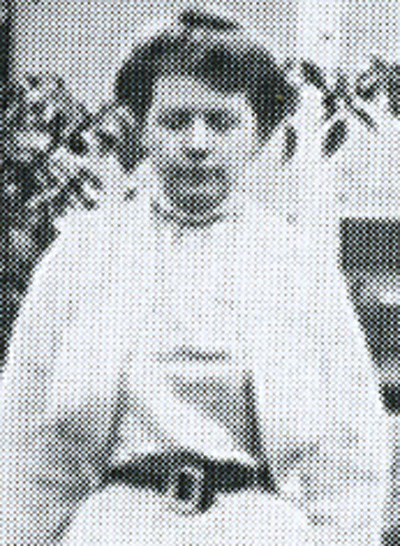
Edith Twynam, daughter of Edward Twynam.

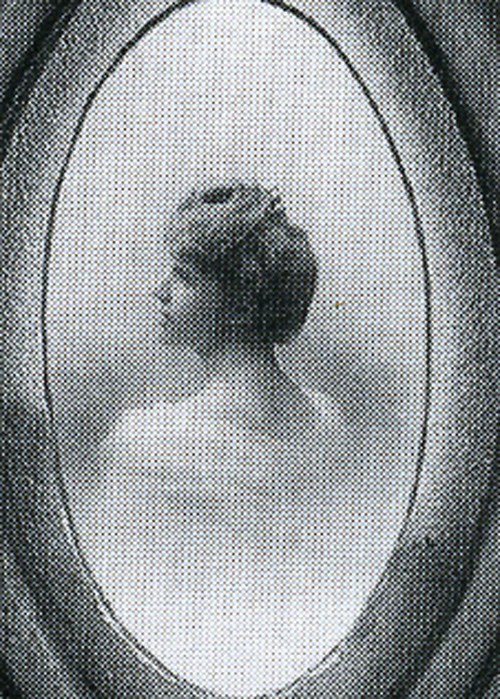
Phoebe Twynam, (married name Phoebe Wesche) daughter of Edward Twynam.

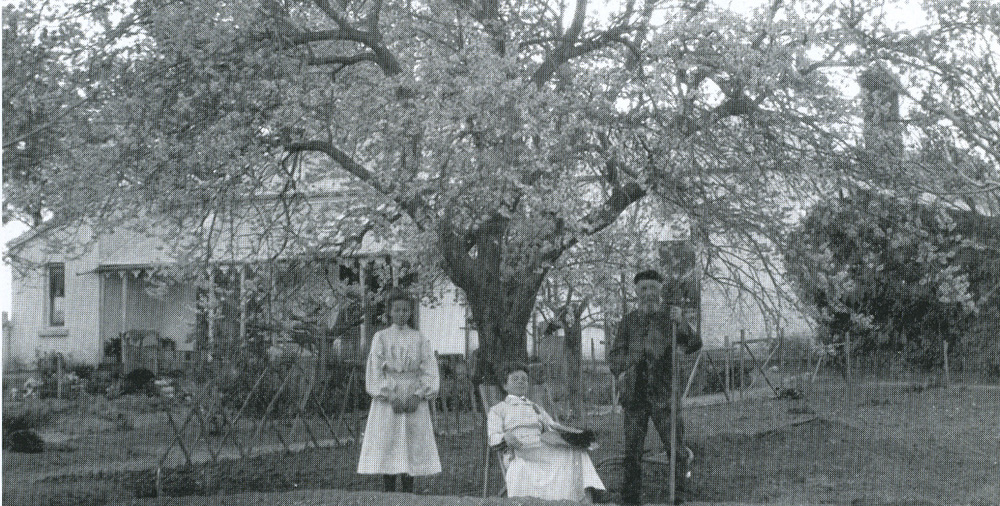
Riversdale circa 1900 with some members of the Twynam family.

=== National Trust ownership ===
In 1967 the National Trust of Australia (NSW) reconstituted the Lindesay Garden Group as the National Trust Garden Committee, with Diana Pockley as chair. This committee's work was broader, including work on replanting the grounds of Experiment Farm cottage, Parramatta, Old Government House, Parramatta and Riversdale, Goulburn.

In 1967 the garden was redesigned by Jean Friend in the style of Gertrude Jeckyll (English Arts & Crafts garden designer, artist, and author) popular after the second world war. The formation of a talented committee ensured the property went from strength to strength. A Victorian cottage garden was established full of greys and greens, lavender and silver, with highlights of pink, yellow, white and red, and heritage roses. Fruit trees were added to the surviving orchard. In the early 2000s the property was leased for a short while as the Trust attempted to resolve the perennial problem of attracting ongoing funding for maintenance of the highly significant heritage in its care. This proved unsuccessful and the experiment was terminated, but not before the committee had resigned. And then one of the worst droughts in living memory struck. Goulburn's water table dropped below the level of the Riversdale bore and the town was on level 5 water restrictions.

Since the Trust took over the property, local members and others have tried to maintain the integrity of its garden, but ten years of drought took a toll. Large trees and special plants died and its beauty faded. The toughest plants struggled on. The Trust employed Debbie Sibbick as new Property Manager and provided support and encouragement. The Friends of Riversdale group was formed as a committee of local volunteers who look after the house and garden. Working with other committee members, "work for the dole" crews, The Men's Shed, the "We Love Goulburn" group and the Southern Tablelands Vintage Farm Machinery club who manage the paddock area. An autumn 2011 appeal raised $25,000 which provided resources to protect the garden by installing an irrigation system. One hundred olive trees (Olea europaea var. europaea cv.) were planted to screen unsightly neighbouring buildings and a pergola was constructed. Soon the reestablishment of the important historic feature of heritage fruit trees and a substantial raised vegetable garden will take place. So in 2011 after years of drought and neglect, Riversdale's garden has been restored.

In 2009 a new committee was formed and volunteers swung into action in 2010. Gravel paths were unearthed and new planting began, transplanting all and sundry from other parts of the garden. The garden now abounds with lamb's ear, catmint, larkspurs, peonies, delphiniums, poppies, sweet peas, lavenders, melianthus (honey flower), salvias, roses and flag iris, alliums and perfumed Lilium candidum. Since winning the Goulburn district Lilac City Garden Competition Judges' Special Award and Best Overall Garden in October 2012, it has attracted more attention.

At the beginning of 2013 over 500 people gathered to hear a special Mass in celebration of the 150th anniversary of the foundation of the Catholic Diocese of Goulburn. The gardens were the site of Goulburn's first Catholic Mass, held there in 1833.

Volunteer Ray Shiel has made Riversdale's vegetable garden his responsibility and has transformed it, along with the viability and appeal of the property. It provides the kitchen and catering team with produce for soups, pie and sandwich fillings, chutneys and pickles that are bringing funds to the property, and re-establishing the property's long tradition of sustainable self-sufficiency. Ray has set up links with groups including the local TAFE School of Horticulture and Primary Production and Goulburn's Permaculture Group, giving demonstrations and workshops and supplying the Homestead Markets (on the third Sunday of each month.

Riversdale received a $2,000 grant from Open Gardens Australia allowing construction of a concrete compost bin to recycle green waste from the 10 acre property (including 4 acres of garden) and for demonstrations. The garden was opened through the Open Gardens Scheme for the first time in 2012 with a unique garden fair, for which it won an Australia Day Award.

Now into the fifth year of its annual Open Garden Australia day and Vintage Fair, monthly homestead markets were initiated in 2014. Riversdale has now become a regional highlight for its heritage gardens, its own produce and as an example of sustainable gardening. A community building partnership grant enabled construction of a ramp to give disabled access to the toilet block. In 2015 a Riversdale Growers' and Rare Plant Fair was held in November and Riversdale Victorian Christmas with the house decked in Victorian style. The property promotes sustainable gardening practices while volunteers are creating a local cuisine using garden produce.

== Description ==
The site of Riversdale is situated at the northern edge of the Old Town of Goulburn. This plan was surveyed soon after Governor Darling had gazetted his 1829 Town Planning Regulations, which were introduced as a measure to standardise the establishment of towns in the Colony and facilitate the survey and scale of town allotments, each of which was to be of a standard size and shape.

Garden and grounds

The property comprises about 10 acres on the outskirts of the town. Riversdale has a partly intact early colonial garden, which has been restored and supplemented since 1967 by National Trust volunteers, mainly of shrubs, perennials, bulbs fruit and shelter trees (the latter, both coniferous and broadleaf).

Significant tree plantings remaining are fruit trees planted in the 1840s including a medlar (Mespilus germanica) which are still in use, an early black locust/false acacia tree (Robinia pseudoacacia) (most likely from a former shelter belt), an 1850s line of elm trees behind (north of) the homestead (Ulmus procera), and early Aleppo (Pinus halepensis), Canary Island (Pinus canariensis) and Monterey pine (Pinus radiata) trees, holm/holly/evergreen oaks (Quercus ilex), honey locust (Gleditsia triacanthos) (also possibly from a former shelter belt), Irish yew (Taxus baccata 'Fastigiata') and funeral cypresses (Cupressus funebris).

Three espaliered apple trees remain from 1918 and the garden reached its peak in the Twynam period of 1872–1969.

The garden was restored by volunteers between 2010 and 2012, winning "best overall" category in a local garden competition in October 2012.

An old well remains, possibly from the 1840s.

Barn

The stone barn is considerably earlier (1828) than the house and is the only surviving building of the "Old Township" of Goulburn as sited by Macquarie. It is probably one of the oldest buildings in Goulburn.

House

Riversdale is a single storey, Colonial Georgian cottage with two wings forming a courtyard at the rear. It is built of brick with an iron roof, (originally shingle), timber floors and cedar joinery. The doors are 8-panelled, double molded cedar and the windows are the usual small panes of glass held in cedar glazing bars. The internal handling of space dates from about 1840. It was built on land granted to Mathew Healy in 1830. Architectural style: Colonial Georgian. Building material: brick with iron roof, timber floors, cedar joinery, 8-panelled doors, double molded cedar.

== Heritage listing ==
Riversdale is a colonial complex of State significance. Its location represents the early foundation of Goulburn town. Its form represents a typical example of the early Australian Colonial house complex with associated gardens, paddocks and outbuildings, together forming an autonomous suburban unit. Of the outbuildings, the stone barn is particularly important for being the only surviving building of the first settlement of Goulburn Plains, established in 1828 and later superseded by the new settlement of Goulburn. Further, the complex of house and outbuildings (including stable) reflects the way of life of the nineteenth century era.

Riversdale, having functioned as inn and a school as well as a residence, has a notable connection with the area's social history over a lengthy period. Its major association is with the term of residence of the Twynam family. Edward Twynam made substantial contributions to the opening up of the south-western regions of the Colony. His family made an important cultural contribution to the life of the district. Riversdale was the second property acquired by the National Trust of Australia (NSW) with the specific purpose of conservation (1992).

Riversdale is an example of a building constructed in the Old Colonial Regency style. It also reflects the typical characteristics of wayside inns built during the 1830-1880 period. Riversdale is notable for its decorative qualities, craftsmanship and workmanship throughout.

Riversdale also has historic and aesthetic significance for its partly intact early colonial garden, which has been restored and supplemented since 1967 by National Trust volunteers. Significant plantings remaining are fruit trees planted in the 1840s including a medlar (Mesiplus germanica) which are still in use, an early black locust/false acacia tree (Robinia pseudoacacia), an 1850s line of elm trees, and early Aleppo, Canary Island and Monterey pine trees, holm oaks, honey locust, Irish yew and funeral cypresses.

Riversdale, Goulburn was listed on the New South Wales State Heritage Register on 1 March 2002 having satisfied the following criteria.

The place is important in demonstrating the course, or pattern, of cultural or natural history in New South Wales.

Riversdale has association with the earliest plan of Goulburn (1829, Old Goulburn now North Goulburn), and with the early town uses. It also has an association with notable citizens. The Healy/ Richards/ Fulljames/ Twynam allotment was the only major private construction of the Old Town, with the added value of its public function as an Inn and rest house. The property is capable of demonstrating a past way of life, which has significance in the City of Goulburn, the southwest of New South Wales, and for the long period of stable occupation by one notable family. It has in the past been recognised as "cultural house", which made a positive contribution to the social life of the town and district. The Riversdale sight is further enhanced by its proximity to the Police Barracks, and later the Goulburn Goal, Riversdale also has associations with early figures in Goulburn's development i.e. Healy, Gould, Levy, Fulljames and Twynam, and the Mounted Police Establishment alongside.

The place is important in demonstrating aesthetic characteristics and/or a high degree of creative or technical achievement in New South Wales.

Riversdale has come to represent a typical example of the early Colonial suburban house. Its architectural form original materials are both typical and evocative of the mid- nineteenth century Colonial period. The surviving outbuildings associated with the house, particularly the stone barn which pre-date it, provide excellent examples of early service buildings attached to a gentlemen's residence. Riversdale setting on the edge of the Goulburn, slightly detached from the town and close to the Wollondilly River, enhances the autonomous quality that the property possessed throughout its history.

The place has potential to yield information that will contribute to an understanding of the cultural or natural history of New South Wales.

The site now embraces some of the land originally used by the Mounted Police stationed at Goulburn. The building formerly connected with this use have now disappeared, but their location is indicated by the early plans. There may have also been earlier buildings, now gone, associated with Riversdale. This endows the site with archaeological significance and potential for archaeological investigation.

The place possesses uncommon, rare or endangered aspects of the cultural or natural history of New South Wales.

Riversdale's rarity is its historical, social and environment association with the construction of Goulburn as a Town.

The place is important in demonstrating the principal characteristics of a class of cultural or natural places/environments in New South Wales.

Riversdale has come to represent a typical example of the early Colonial suburban house. Its architectural form original materials are both typical and evocative of the mid- nineteenth century Colonial period.

== See also ==
- List of historic homesteads in Australia
