= Lindesay, Darling Point =

Lindesay
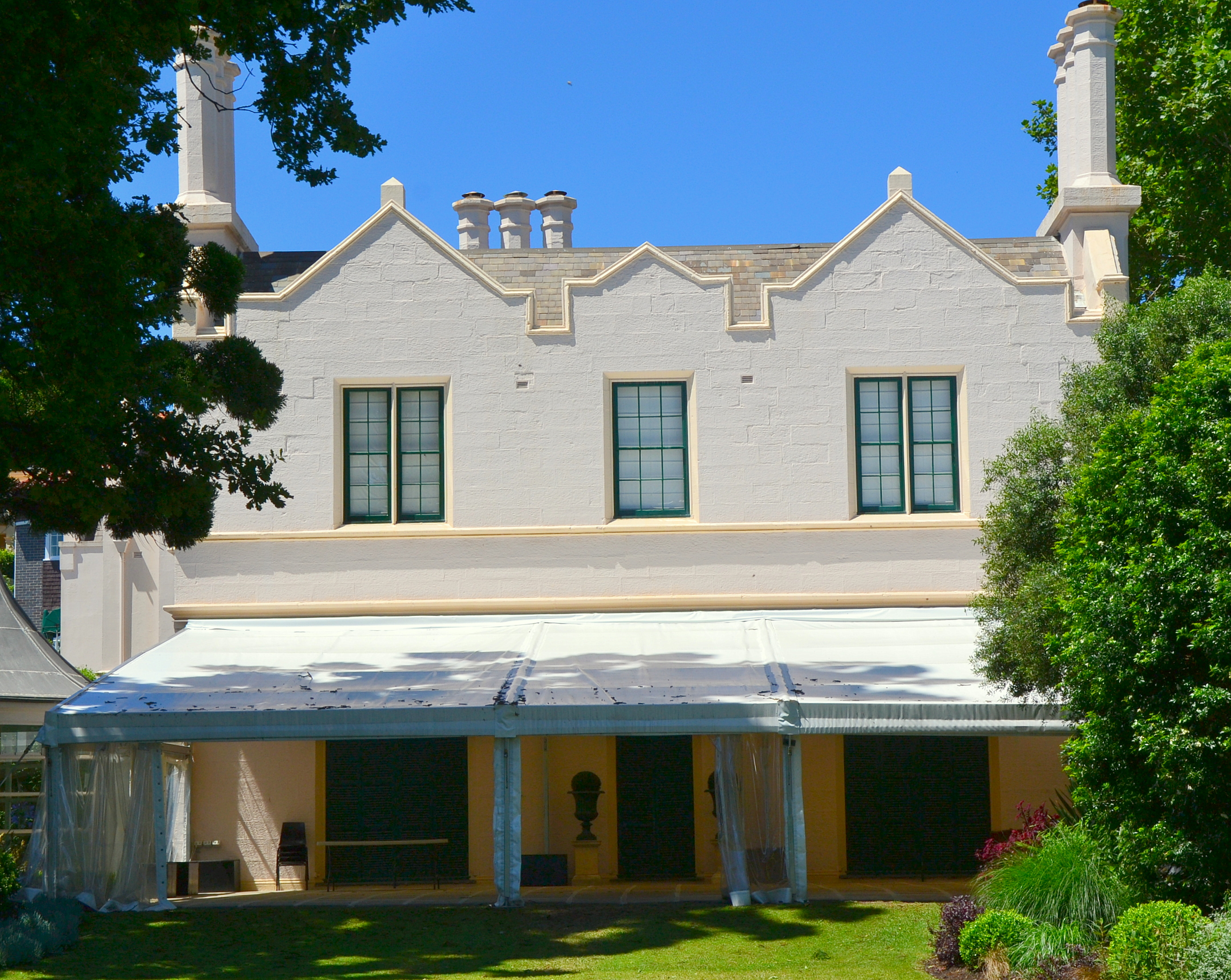
- Lindesay today

- Location within inner Sydney
- 33°52′03″S 151°14′24″E
- Location: 1a Carthona Avenue, Darling Point, Sydney, Australia

History
- Built: 1834–1836

Site notes
- Architects: James Chadley (attributed); Edward Hallen (attributed); Francis Clarke; Robertson & Marks (service wing)
- Architectural style: Gothic Revival
- Owner: National Trust of Australia (NSW)

New South Wales Heritage Register
- Official name: Lindesay
- Type: State heritage (complex / group)
- Designated: 2 April 1999
- Reference no.: 686
- Type: Villa
- Category: Residential buildings (private)

Lindesay is a heritage-listed former residence and now offices, functions and house museum located at 1a Carthona Avenue, Darling Point, Sydney, Australia. It was designed by James Chadley and Edward Hallen (attributed), Francis Clarke and Robertson & Marks (service wing) and built from 1834 to 1836. The property is owned by the National Trust of Australia (NSW). It was added to the New South Wales State Heritage Register on 2 April 1999. Lindesay was the first major house to be constructed on Darling Point and is aesthetically important as the earliest example of the domestic Gothic Revival style in Sydney. Some of its residents were colourful figures who played an important part in the history of New South Wales.

== History ==
=== Darling Point or Yarranabbee ===
Originally known by its Aboriginal name Yarranabbee, Darling Point was named Mrs Darling's Point by Governor Ralph Darling in honour of his wife, Eliza. At that time the area was heavily timbered, but after New South Head Road was built in 1831 timber cutters felled most of the trees, and the land was subdivided. Most of the plots, covering 9-15 acres in this area, were taken up between 1833 and 1838. The suburb later became known as Darling Point. Several notable people bought land and built homes here, including surveyor-general Sir Thomas Mitchell's Carthona and one-time home Lindesay.

Mrs Darling's Point was named by Surveyor Larmer, who did the original survey (on 11 September 1833 nine allotments were laid out).

The first land grant was made in 1833 to a Thomas Holt. In 1833 "villa allotments" were advertised for sale at "Mrs Darling's Point". There were soon several cottages and villas built in the area, but from the 1840s more grandiose mansions arose as the colony's most successful businessmen bought up land on the point. ....

=== Lindesay ===
Lindesay is an 1834–36 house built for the then colony's Treasurer, Campbell Drummond Riddell (b.1796 – a young and well-connected Scotsman) and his wife Caroline (née Stuart Rodney, b.1814 in Ceylon, the 16-year-old daughter of the Government Secretary in Colombo) on a site of c. 6.9 hectares (17 acres) of land with stables, outbuildings and garden sweeping down to the harbour. The property took two years to complete.

It was designed as a villa – typically a free-standing rectangular block which presents a different, self-contained facade on each side. This was a style much favoured by professional families at the time in rural Britain but, although bearing similarities to designs in English Regency Pattern Books, the design of Lindesay is simpler, reflecting a mix of Scottish austerity with a good dose of colonial disregard for convention. This very simplicity could possibly be read as a snub to Governor Bourke, who was rapidly becoming persona non grata for Riddell and others in colonial society and whose plans for a new Government House were "modern Gothic" and ornate, to say the least. The design owed much to contemporary pattern books and was also attributed initially to James Chadley and Edward Hallen, although the work was completed under the direction of Francis Clarke. It was named in honour of Colonel Patrick Lindesay (1778–1839) who was acting governor of the colony from 22 October to 2 December 1831, between the departure of Governor Darling and the arrival of the next governor, Sir Richard Bourke. This Acting Governor reserved the 6.9 hectares (17 acres) for Riddell in 1834 and it is believed that this favour of reserving the land led Riddell to name the house after his friend, the fellow Scot, Patrick Lindesay.

The Riddells moved into Lindesay with their two-year-old son in 1836, but remained there only two years. Following their departure the property had a number of owners including Sir Thomas Mitchell who, as Surveyor-General in the 1830s, conducted three major expeditions into the interior of Australia. In 1841 he sold it to his friend Sir Charles Nicholson, an avid collector of rare books and antiquities and future chancellor of the University of Sydney. Nicholson housed his library, thought to be one of the largest private libraries in the colony, at Lindesay, with a special room set aside for his statues. In 1849 Nicholson sold to William Bradley, a wealthy pastoralist who had married Emily Hovell, daughter of explorer William Hovell. He died at Lindesay in 1868.

Additions to the house, new and altered outbuildings and changes to the property boundaries were made by successive owners throughout the 19th century, including James Barker (1838–41); Mitchell (1841–45); Nicholson (1845–59); William Bradley (1849–68); and John Macintosh (1868–1911).

Sir Thomas Mitchell, Surveyor-General of NSW, bought Lindesay in 1841 to be in a better position to supervise the construction of his own house, Carthona, down on the Darling Point waterfront nearby (to its south). Mitchell in the 1830s had undertaken three major expeditions throughout Australia, taking his reports back to England and being knighted for his effort. His youngest daughter Blanche was born here in 1843. He sold the house in 1843 to his friend, Dr Charles Nicholson, eminent art collector and patron of artists. Sir Thomas Mitchell in 1841 began to build Carthona near the water's edge. He wanted to escape Darlinghurst (his home here on Darlinghurst Ridge was called 'Craigend') which he now considered "too built up". Carthona was another Gothic revival manor, complete with castellations. The design was copied from an English pattern book.

Sir Charles Nicholson purchased Lindesay in 1845, after moving to Sydney in 1843 and being elected to the New South Wales Legislative Council. He would later become Speaker. He sold Lindesay to William Bradley in 1849. Sydney newspapers of the mid 1850s give reports of the social activities of the era and of the hostesses who entertained with charm and elan. One of the famous venues was the Gothic style mansion Lindesay. It was ... occupied ...later by William Bradley, a wealthy pastoralist, who reared his motherless daughters in the house. City of Sydney councillor John Macintosh bought the property in 1868. While he was at Lindesay, Macintosh built two other houses on Darling Point – Braeside and Cintra – for his children.

In 1911 Macintosh died at Lindesay and it was sold two years later to Alfred Wunderlich who subdivided it. After subdivision, which involved removal of its 19th century garden, the house and a small area of land around it were bought by Dr Edward Jenkins. He engaged Robertson & Marks as architects for the rebuilding of the service wing at the rear of the house and internal alterations including bathrooms and replacement of the principal stair in the main house. The property was sold to the Pye family in 1926, the Macintoshes moving to a smaller house at 35 New South Head Road, Vaucluse. Charles and Mary Pye lived the rest of their life at Lindesay. c. 1935 (pre WW2) Walter Pye built a gazebo between the (now) parterre garden and the main garden. In 1960, Colonel Pye divided the house into three flats, with further subsequent internal alterations. On his death in 1963, his brother Walter D. Pye donated the house and a collection of furniture to the National Trust of Australia (NSW).

In 1960 Cherry Jackaman joined Dame Helen Blaxland on the Women's Committee of the National Trust of Australia (NSW). Jackaman chaired this committee from 1964 to 1967, and by 1968 it had raised more than $100,000, which was directed to Experiment Farm Cottage, Lindesay and the St.Matthews Anglican Church at Windsor Appeal. The committee was established to raise funds, source furnishings and encourage membership of the trust. Since 1963 the house has been used by committees of the National Trust of Australia (NSW) as offices and has also been used for public functions and exhibitions. In 1964 the Lindesay Management Committee was established by the National Trust (NSW). Fundraising commenced through exhibitions, antique fairs, etc. Dame Helen Blaxland chaired this committee from its inauguration until 1976, then continuing her involvement as "Honourable Housekeeper". The Women's Committee of the National Trust (NSW) continue to run events including an annual antiques/decorating fair and private home visits to fund raise for the maintenance of Lindesay.

Guy Lovell was honorary architect for the National Trust, charged with restoring the property. In 1966 the Lindesay Garden Group was established to recreate a garden setting reminiscent of early designs. Diana Pockley was appointed chair. The garden plan focussed on the harbour view. This was framed by trees and plantings tall enough to obscure adjacent buildings, and remains today, adding a wonderful dimension to the rich colour and form of the grounds – a direct link between the property today, and as it was in the days of its first occupants. In the 1960s garden designer Jocelyn Brown designed a plan for the entrance garden at Lindesay. An existing plane tree (Platanus orientalis) in the centre of the space dictated the shape of the plan. Sawn stone edging was suggested for the garden beds, in keeping with the stone of the kitchen courtyard of the house, and the drive was finished with brick gutters. This entrance, with minor changes in planting detail, has developed into an impressive shaded forecourt to the building, a leafy canopy enriched with darker greens around the periphery. To the east of the house where the grounds are walled, a formal courtyard (parterre) garden was planted, laid out to designs by Guy Lovell. This remains today (2003), a geometric arrangement of gravel paths and low box (Buxus sempervirens) hedges define flower beds planted with ivy (Hedera sp.). This parterre is enclosed with a high, clipped privet hedge (Ligustrum sp.), and presided over by "the Four Seasons", a fine set of 19th century, Italian female figure sculptures of Serena stone. The funds to enable this work were raised by the Lindesay Garden Group and Lindesay Management Committee, by women including Diana Pockley, Dame Helen Blaxland, Peggy Muntz and Rosemary Fairbairn.

In 1967 the National Trust reconstituted the Lindesay Garden Group as the National Trust Garden Committee, with Diana Pockley as chair. This committee's work was broader, including work on replanting the grounds of Experiment Farm cottage, Parramatta, Old Government House, Parramatta and Riversdale, Goulburn.

The Women's Committee's plan was to recreate a garden setting for the villa that was reminiscent of 19th century gardens. An English oak (Quercus robur) was planted as a symbol of "home" for the first lady of the house, Caroline Riddell. A hoop pine (Araucaria cunninghamii) was added to acknowledge the place of native "auricarias" in 19th century horticultural fashion, and the central lawn sweeping down to the (harbour) view was edged with other plants on the era's must-have lists. Long-time volunteer Ros Sweetapple jokes about being closely supervised in the early days, and only allowed to trim the (box) parterre with nail scissors. She also recalls visits made to Rookwood Cemetery to collect cuttings of old roses to fill Lindesay's beds with authentic, 19th century plant material.

In 1989-91 the National Trust went through turbulent times. A new management committee was established for Lindesay, chaired by Aline Fenwick OBE, which organised many fund raising events, exhibitions, open days and opportunities to hire out the property to generate income to maintain it.

In August 2009 the governor Marie Bashir, Sir Nicholas Shehadie and other guests enjoyed a dinner party hosted by the Trust Board to mark Lindesay's 175th anniversary. With a Scottish theme to honour its first owner, Campbell Drummond Riddell, and many subsequent Scottish owners, guests included Mr Edward Sly, descendant of Sir Thomas Mitchell, second owner of Lindesay and generous donor of Mitchell memorabilia to the house; Mr Jim Macintosh, a descendant of the family which owned Lindesay from 1870 to 1913 and generous donor to the house. Guests enjoyed the new garden planting and inspired garden lighting, all possible by the fundraising work of the Special Events Panel of the Women's Committee (National Trust Magazine (NSW), August to October 2009/Spring, 5). National Trust Magazine NSW November 2008 to January 2009: $5,969 was used to assist in maintenance of the garden. May 2013 – The National Trust Women's Committee celebrated 50 years of National Trust ownership of the property. This committee has used Lindesay extensively over the years as a base for events for fundraising for the trust.

By 2014 the attempt to make a 19th-century garden in the 21st century was failing and the focus on authentic plant material gave way to something more elusive. The aim was to recreate the sense of pleasure that being in the garden at Lindesay always provided: to offset the house and views without replicating a vintage plant palette. Partly this change had to do with pragmatism. Like all Trust properties, Lindesay has to sing for its supper. The weddings functions, fairs, photo and film shoots that pay its way all demand a garden that looks good every day of the year. To make it happen, the mature plantings stayed but everything else went. Private garden designer Christopher Nicholas devised a modern planting plan that has references to the past and looks good in a wedding photo. Flowers flush throughout the year, mostly in subtle blue tones, and a tapestry of silver, blue and purple foliage supplements the background greens. A team of volunteers keep it in great condition, with five-hours-a-week help from a professional, Nicholas Ball of Avant Design.

The National Trust Women's Committee launched its oral history collection on May 20, 2017. The group of women had many achievements . Formed in 1961, they have raised over $20m for the National Trust of Australia (NSW) in 56 years. To record their own story the Women's Committee initiated its oral history collection and in conjunction with "Having a Voice", have curated a modest exhibition capturing the mood of the times.

==== The Riddells who built Lindesay ====
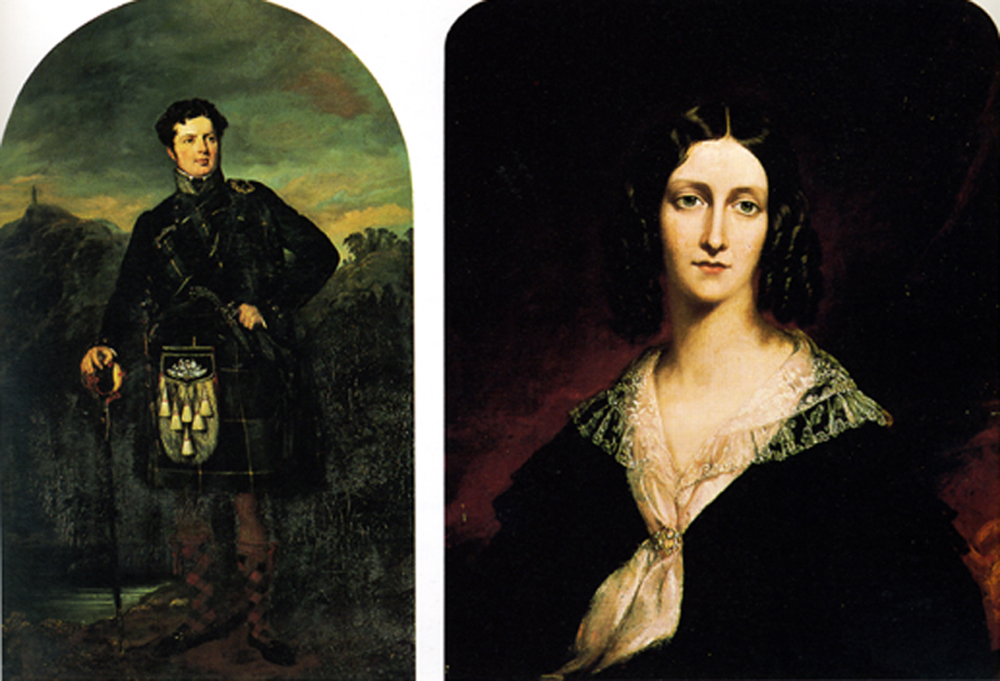
Campbell Drummond Riddell and his wife Caroline Stuart Riddell

Campbell Drummond Riddell was born in 1796 in Scotland. His grandfather was Sir James Riddell, first baronet of Ardnamurchan, Argyllshire. In 1829 he joined the colonial service and was sent briefly to Ceylon as a commissioner of inquiry. While he was in Ceylon he met Caroline Stuart Rodney who was the daughter of the government secretary there.

Caroline was born in 1814 in Ceylon and was only 16 when she married Campbell Riddell in 1830 in Colombo. She was part of a very large family. Her father was the Honorable John Rodney and her mother was Lady Louisa Martha Stratford, his second wife. Her mother died when she was a baby and her father married again.

Shortly after the Riddells were married they sailed to Sydney where Campbell was to assume his new appointment as Colonial Treasurer of New South Wales. In 1834 Campbell commenced construction of Lindesay on Darling Point. They moved into the house in 1836 and by this time they had one two-year-old son. They resided at Lindesay for only a short time, less than two years. A notice in the Sydney Gazette for April 1838 said that Caroline had given birth to their second child, a son, at Darlinghurst. Campbell and Caroline had five children altogether, two sons and three daughters.

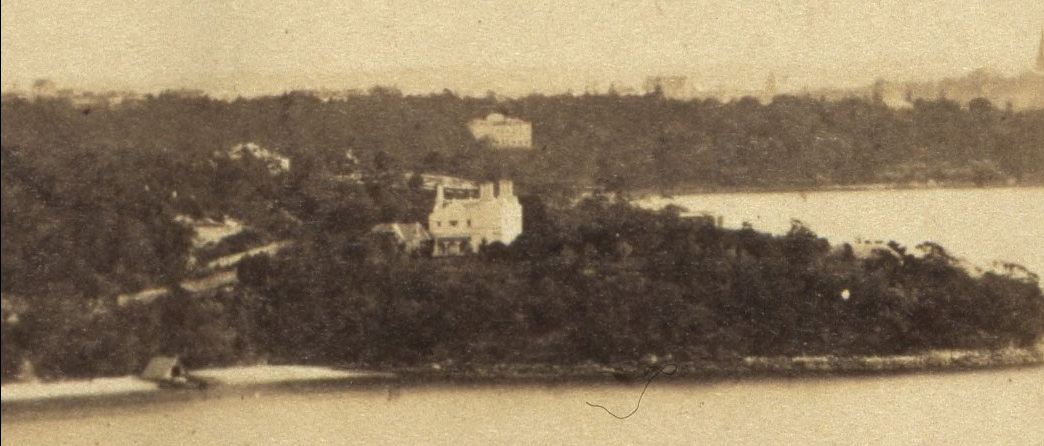
Lindesay, Darling Point, c. 1855 when it was still very isolated

The Riddells remained in Sydney until 1857 and then returned to England. They took up residence in Regent's Park Terrace which was and still is a very fashionable part of London. The following year in 1858 Campbell died at his home. The Census data for the United Kingdom and other directories show that Caroline remained at Regents Park Terrace for the next 10 years and then moved to 16 Wellington Square in Cheltenham. One of her daughters, Louisa, who did not marry lived with her. Caroline died in 1898 at the age of 84 at her home.

The portrait of Campbell is recorded as having been donated to the Mitchell Library in 1938 by E. Knowles. The second eldest daughter, also named Caroline, married Louis William Knowles so this appears to be a relative. This portrait also has some historical interest. In 1829 before the couple came to Australia it was in an Exhibition of the Royal Academy. Listed as a Portrait of Campbell Riddell Esq by J. Partridge it was favourably mentioned and was one of those described as a "very clever portrait".

After the Riddells left Lindesay in 1838 there were two owners over a very short period. Thomas Icely held the house for about a year and then sold it to James Barker who, with his brother, subdivided the property into eighteen allotments and put them and the house up for sale in 1841. Thomas Mitchell bought the house and some of the land on the same day that it was advertised.

==== The Mitchell family in residence ====
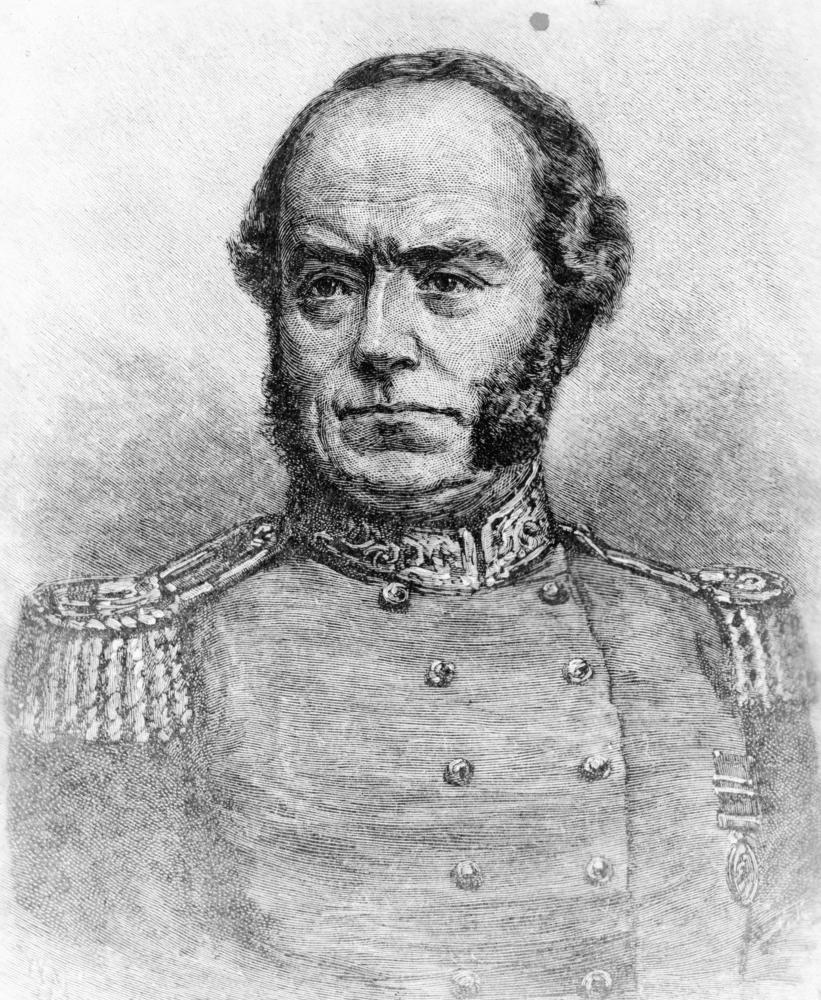
Sir Thomas Mitchell

Thomas Mitchell was born in 1792 in Scotland. His family was not wealthy but he joined the military and was proficient in drawing up plans of battlefields. In 1818 he married Mary Thomson Blunt who was the eighteen-year-old daughter of General Richard Blunt. In 1827 the couple came to Sydney and Thomas became Assistant Surveyor General of New South Wales and two years later became Surveyor General. During the 1830s Mitchell conducted three major expeditions into the interior of Australia. In 1837 he went to England and published a book about his explorations and obtained his knighthood. He returned to Sydney from England in 1841 and soon after purchased Lindesay.

When the Mitchells came to Lindesay they had been married for 23 years and Mary had borne eleven children, of whom one died in infancy. At this time there were six sons and four daughters all under 22 years of age. While they were living at Lindesay another daughter, Blanche, was born in 1843.

While he was at Lindesay Mitchell was planning to build Carthona also on Darling Point. Besides buying Lindesay on Lot 1 in 1841, Mitchell also bought Lots 7, 12, 13, 14 and 15. It is on the last four lots that Carthona was constructed. In 1845 the Mitchell family moved into Carthona and Mitchell sold Lindesay to his friend Sir Charles Nicholson.

==== Sir Charles Nicholson as the owner of Lindesay ====
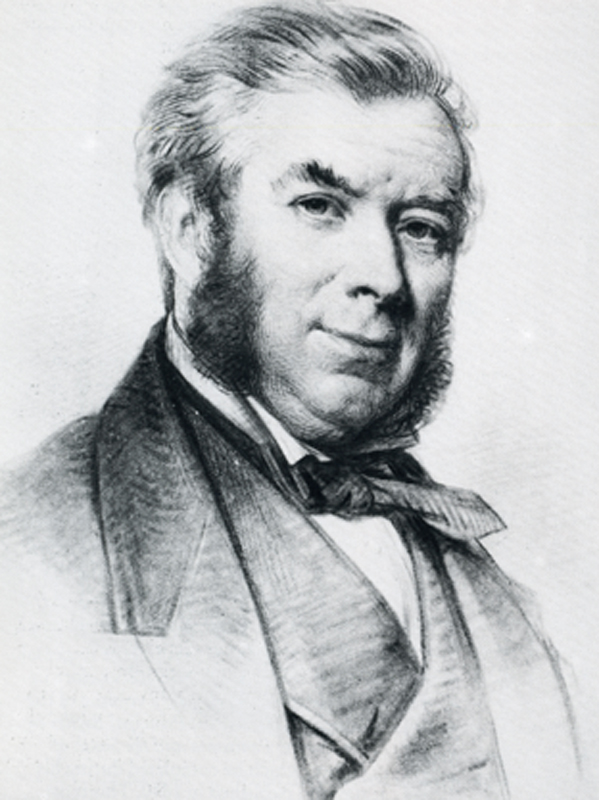
Sir Charles Nicholson 1867

Sir Charles Nicholson was born in 1808`in England. His parents died while he was young and he was brought up by a maiden aunt in Yorkshire. He obtained a good education and graduated as a medical doctor in 1833. In the same year he came to Sydney with his aunt and joined his uncle Captain James Ascough who was a very wealthy man. A few years later his uncle died and Charles inherited his extensive wealth. He moved to Sydney and in 1843 was elected to the New South Wales Legislative Council and three years later became Speaker of the council.

By the time he purchased Lindesay in 1845 he had begun to collect rare books, antiquities, pictures and manuscripts. At this stage he was a bachelor and with his considerable wealth he had the time and money to indulge his interest. One visitor to the house said that Nicholson had a very fine library which he thought was one of the largest private libraries in the colony and he also had a special room for his statues.

In 1849 Charles bought Tarmons, a large house at Potts Point and sold Lindesay to William Bradley. After he left Lindesay he played an important part in the establishment of Sydney University and later became its chancellor. In 1862 he returned to England and married Sarah Keightley. He died in 1903 at the age of 95.

==== William Bradley and his children ====
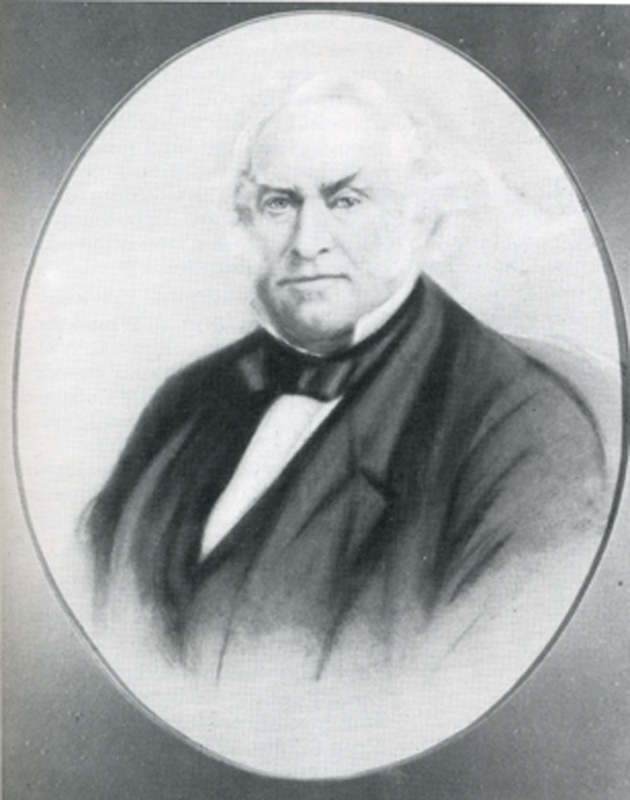
William Bradley circa 1860

William Bradley was born in New South Wales and was a very wealthy pastoralist. He had extensive grazing lands in the Monaro district and owned the property called Landsdowne near Goulburn. In 1831 he married Emily Hovell daughter of William Hovel, the explorer, and they had eight children, three of whom died at a fairly early age.

In 1843 he became the member for Argyle in the New South Wales Legislative Council. In 1846 he took his family to Europe because of his wife's poor health but unfortunately she died while they were in Rome in 1848. He now had to care for his five daughters alone. He returned to Australia and in 1849 bought Lindesay where he brought up his children. His daughters grew up and eventually married. Sadly his second daughter Esther died at Lindesay in 1856 at age 22. Her death notice records that she had been married to an Englishman, Edward Maitland, and had an infant son.

In 1858 the family went to England for two years. A diary by Georgina Mann indicates that William Baker Boulton may have leased the property during this time as she speaks of the Boultons at a ball there. However it is possible that Mrs Boulton was the housekeeper for Lindesay as there are numerous advertisements in the Sydney Morning Herald for staff for Lindesay in which Mrs Boulton is listed as the person to contact. These occur during and even well before the time the Bradleys left for England. In 1859 there is a birth notice for a son born at Lindesay in the newspaper to Mrs A Rhodes. It is at least possible that the Rhodes were the leasees and the Boultons were staff who perhaps lived at Lindesay.

Mrs A Rhodes (Mary Waud Rhodes (née Wilson))was the wife of Alexander Rhodes (Civil Engineer). They had married 19 June 1855 at the British Embassy, Paris, Île-de-France, France. Alexander Rhodes had come to New South Wales to work on the construction of the Campbelltown-Picton section of the main Southern line railway line after being appointed engineer by the firm Messrs. Peto, Brassey and Co. (formerly Messrs. Peto, Brassey and Betts, for whom his cousin Thomas Rhodes Firth had also come to New South Wales to expand the railway network. Thomas R Firth became Civil Engineer-in-Chief for the NSW Rail) (information within family history of A. Firth with original sourcing from certificates and known facts from the family).

In 1868 William Bradley died at Lindesay and the house was bought by John Macintosh who lived there for 43 years and was its longest resident.

==== The Macintosh family in residence ====
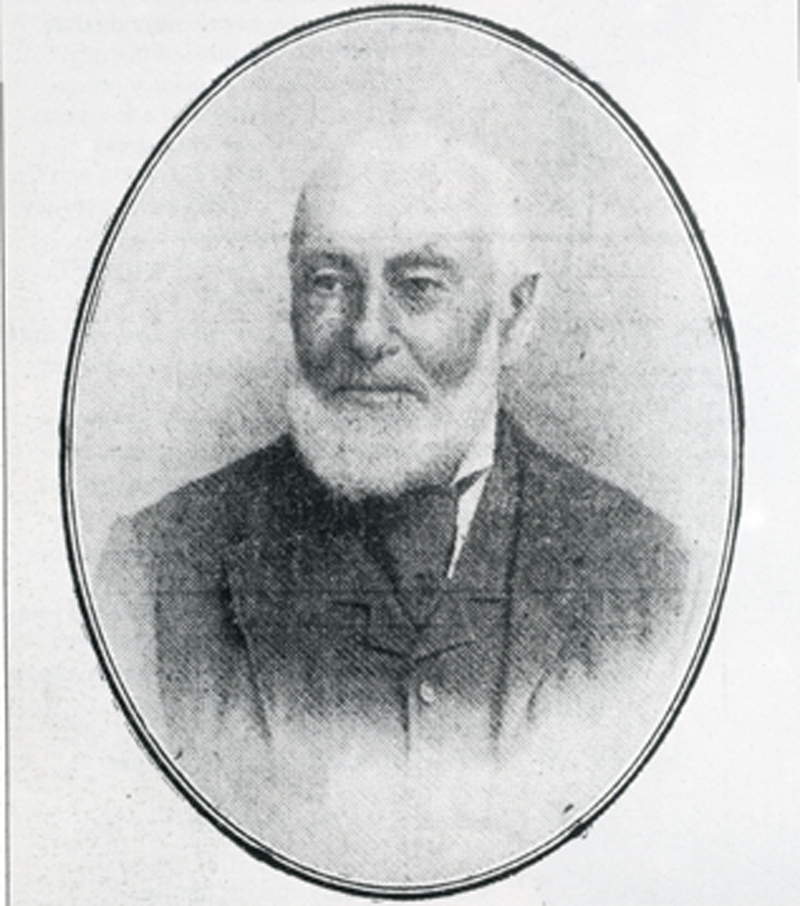
Mr John Macintosh

John Macintosh was born in 1821 in Scotland. His early life was extremely deprived as his parents died when he was 10 and he worked as a farm labourer for a very small wage. When he was 17 he came to Sydney with his sister and brother in law and found work as a labourer on farms and as an assistant in a store. He was self-educated and in 1846 set up as an ironmonger in Sydney and soon had a successful business.

In 1849 he married Caroline Alway and together they further developed their business. In 1861 he became an alderman on the Sydney City Council. When the Macintosh family moved to Lindesay in 1868 they had six children under the age 16. Over the next five years while they were at Lindsay, Caroline had four more children. Unfortunately Caroline died in 1880 at age 46 so John Macintosh raised the younger children alone. He did not seek re-election to the Sydney City Council after her death but the following year he was appointed to the New South Wales Legislative Council.

While he was at Lindesay John Macintosh built two other houses on Darling Point for his children. Braeside in 1876 for his daughter Jessie and Cintra in 1882 for his son James. He also built a house at Burradoo. In 1911 John died at Lindesay and Lindesay was sold two years later to Alfred Wunderlich who subdivided the land. In 1914 Dr Edward Jenkins bought the house.

==== The Jenkins family at Lindesay ====
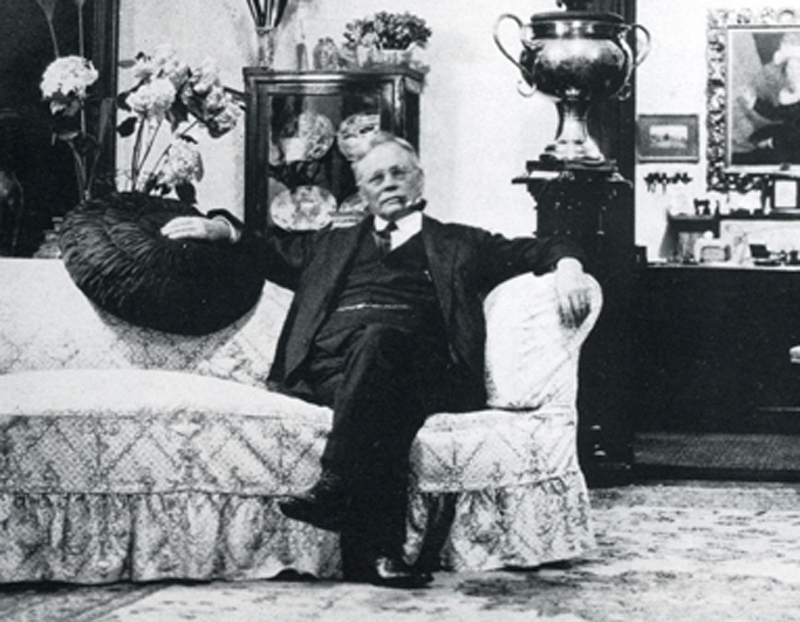
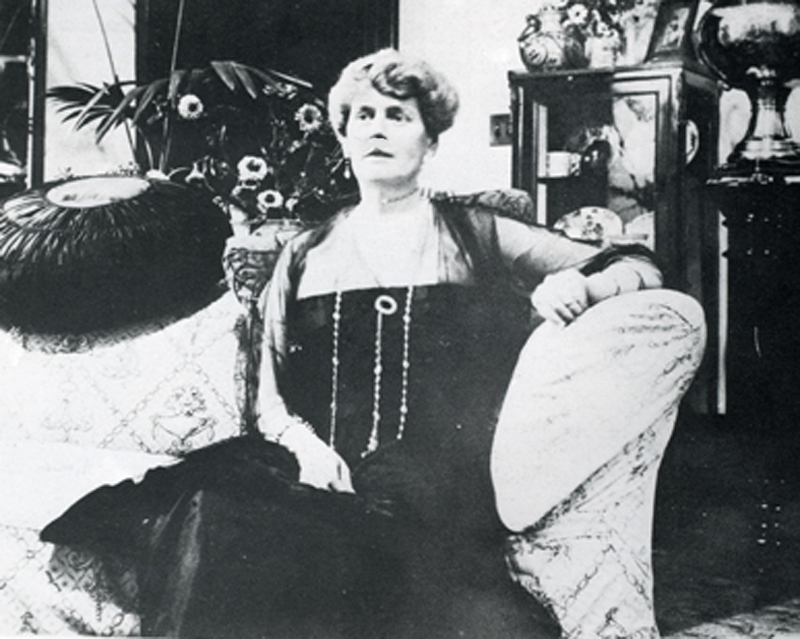
Dr Edward Jenkins and Mrs Jenkins circa 1920.

Dr Edward Jenkins was born in 1854. He grew up at Parkhall (then renamed Nepean Towers) which was a large house that Thomas Mitchell had built in the Southern Highlands. He won a scholarship to Oxford University, where he studied medicine. He returned to Sydney in 1884 and worked for some time at the Royal Prince Alfred Hospital, Camperdown and later had a private practice in Macquarie Street. In 1887 he married Annie MacCabe, who was then 19 years old. They had three children, two sons and a daughter. Edward, the eldest son, was born in 1888, Osborne was born in 1890 and Merle Judith (usually called Judith) in 1895.

When Edward Jenkins bought Lindsay in 1914 he was 60 and close to retirement. They were a family who enjoyed socialising, and many of their outings and holidays are portrayed in family albums as their daughter Judith was a keen photographer. Between 1919 and 1921 the Jenkins travelled abroad and the house was leased to Gwendoline Collins, the recent widow of William Collins of Beaudesert, Queensland.

In 1926 the Jenkins family moved to a smaller house at 35 New South Head Road, Vaucluse. Edward died in 1940 at the age of 86, his wife Annie in 1949 at the age of 81. His daughter Judith did not marry and died at the age of 81 in 1976 in Sydney.

==== The Pye Family ====
Lindesay was bought by Charles and Mary Pye in 1926. Charles was born 1860 at Riverstone and became a wealthy pastoralist. He married Mary Fitzsimmons in 1890. His sons followed him into the pastoral business. Unfortunately, Charles died the year after he moved into Lindesay but his widow remained at the home until her death in 1961. During some of this time, her eldest son John, who had remained a bachelor, stayed with her. When she died she left Lindesay to him but he also died two years later and a younger son Walter inherited the house. In 1963 Walter Pye decided to give Lindesay to the National Trust of Australia and since then it has been owned and maintained by them.

== Description ==
=== Northern garden ===
Lindesay's northern garden is much reduced from its original lands, with subdivisions and encroachment from Canonbury (dem.), itself now the core of adjacent McKell Park. That park's existence as open space means some of the original harbour vista of Lindesay to the water to its north remains open space and a direct, albeit narrow, line of view exists between house terrace (now marquee), garden and harbour.

A pair of lineal borders flanks this northern garden and softens the visual impacts of neighbouring houses. These borders are richly planted by the National Trust of Australia Lindesay Garden Group. Plantings include ornamental banana (Musa sp.), Dombeya wallichii (pale pink hibiscus relative)

A large mature hoop pine (Araucaria cunninghamii) is visually dominant and growing close to the house's immediate north-eastern corner. This tree is at least early 20th century, perhaps older.

The house's front entrance faces west towards Darling Point Road. In this eastern garden, a large plane tree dominates along with a circular carriage drive. A set of pedestrian gates faces a small lane off the road. Vehicular and stable entry for Lindesay is to the south of this space, forming a "rear yard" rather than a garden, onto another lane.

=== Eastern garden ===
The trust recreated a garden setting reminiscent of early designs. The garden plan focussed on the harbour view. This was framed by trees and plantings tall enough to obscure adjacent buildings, and remains today, adding a wonderful dimension to the rich colour and form of the grounds – a direct link between the property today, and as it was in the days of its first occupants.

In the 1960s Jocelyn Brown designed a plan for the entrance garden at Lindesay. An existing plane tree (Platanus orientalis) in the centre of the space dictated the shape of the plan. Sawn stone edging was suggested for the garden beds, in keeping with the stone of the kitchen courtyard of the house, and the drive was finished with brick gutters. This entrance, with minor changes in planting detail, has developed into an impressive shaded forecourt to the building, a leafy canopy enriched with darker greens around the periphery.

To the east of the house where the grounds are walled, a formal courtyard (parterre) garden was planted, laid out to designs by Guy Lovell. This remains today (2003), a geometric arrangement of gravel paths and low box (Buxus sempervirens) hedges define flower beds planted with ivy (Hedera sp.). This parterre is enclosed with a high, clipped privet hedge (Ligustrum sp.), and presided over by "the Four Seasons", a fine set of 19th century, Italian female figure sculptures of Serena stone.

=== Modifications and dates ===
- c. 1935 (pre WW2) Walter Pye built a gazebo between the present parterre garden and the main garden to enable his mother to take tea out of the wind.
- 1964–71 restoration by the National Trust.
- 1964 Lindesay Management Committee established. Fundraising commenced through exhibitions, antique fairs etc. Dame Helen Blaxland chaired the committee from its inauguration until 1976, then continuing her involvement as "Hon Housekeeper". The Women's Committee of the National Trust (NSW) continue to run events including an annual antiques/decorating fair and private home visits to fund raise for the maintenance of Lindesay.
- Guy Lovell was Honorary Architect for the National Trust, charged with restoring the property.
- 1960s Jocelyn Brown designed a plan for the entrance garden at Lindesay. An existing plane tree (Platanus orientalis) in the centre of the space dictated the shape of the plan. Sawn stone edging was suggested for the garden beds, in keeping with the stone of the kitchen courtyard of the house, and the drive was finished with brick gutters. This entrance has since had minor changes in planting detail.
- 1966 Lindesay Garden Group established to recreate a garden setting reminiscent of early designs. Diana Pockley was appointed chair. The garden plan focussed on the harbour view. This was framed by trees and plantings tall enough to obscure adjacent buildings, and remains today, adding a wonderful dimension to the rich colour and form of the grounds - a direct link between the property today, and as it was in the days of its first occupants. Lindesay's boundaries were planted to screen unsympathetic adjoining development, while retaining single remaining vista north to harbour. Two telegraph poles and wires obscuring this view were removed. Two large cast iron urns were moved to the edge of the garden (northern edge), to frame the harbour view and create an illusion of steps descending to the next level of the garden (as it once would have had), and the harbour beyond. Research in Mitchell library on contemporary plant availability, tastes and letters, to reinstate appropriate plants and garden. An English oak (Quercus robur) was planted (one of the first Trust plantings) as a symbol of home to Caroline Riddell. The next was a hoop pine (Araucaria cunninghamii), popular trees with estate gardens at the time. A lawn was planted to take the eye down the garden (north) to the vista beyond, and curved planting beds established on both sides, to allow a massed planting of dense shrubs and smaller plants and flowers to create a sense of seclusion from outside. A dense green cover was aimed for, in line with the landscape design of Lancelot "Capability" Brown in England, popular and influential at that time. Plantings include species rather than cultivars and double forms to be more authentic to what would have been available mid 19th century. Agapanthus, Jacaranda mimosaefolia, Magnolia sp., citrus and olive trees were included, as these would have been collected at ports of call on the way to Australia, and thus available in the colony at the time. To the east of the house where the grounds are walled, a formal courtyard (parterre) garden was planted (to replace an area "boasting a few half dead hydrangeas"), laid out to designs by Guy Lovell, honorary architect charged with guiding the property's restoration. This remains today (2003), a geometric arrangement of gravel paths and low box (Buxus sempervirens) hedges define flower beds planted with ivy (Hedera sp.). This parterre is enclosed with a high, clipped privet hedge (Ligustrum sp.), and presided over by "the Four Seasons", a fine set of 19th century, Italian female figure sculptures of Serena stone. The funds to enable this work were raised by the Lindesay Garden Group and Lindesay Management Committee, by women including Diana Pockley and Dame Helen Blaxland.
- 1967 the National Trust reconstituted the Lindesay Garden Group as the National Trust Garden Committee, with Diana Pockley as chair. This committee's work was broader, including work on replanting the grounds of Experiment Farm cottage, Parramatta, Old Government House, Parramatta and Riversdale, Goulburn. The Garden Committee has also raised funds for significant enhancements at Lindesay. One is the stone slab "floor" for the marquee providing a sheltered venue for weddings and events, north of the house.

== Heritage listing ==
As at 22 May 2007, Lindesay is historically significant as the first major house to be constructed on Darling Point following its subdivision in the 1830s. The subsequent changes to the house and grounds reflect historical events over more than 150 years. Lindesay has important associations with its owners and occupants, many of whom have played a significant part in the history of NSW.

The house is aesthetically significant as the earliest example of the domestic Gothick style in Sydney, and contains a distinctive set of reception rooms with notable early features including a Louis XIV chimneypiece. The collection of movable heritage and furnishings at Lindesay, assembled by the National Trust of Australia (NSW), includes some items with direct association to former occupants, and some important pieces of Australian colonial furniture. Lindesay established a benchmark in 1963 for the restoration and use of a furnished historic house to recreate and interpret the past. Areas which retain high archaeological potential have been identified in some of the upstairs rooms in the main house and also in the rear courtyard at the south of the main building, in addition to those already excavated. It is likely that additional surviving archaeological material present at this site would be able to contribute evidence not available from other sources, which, when analysed in conjunction with documentary evidence, will provide additional information about the occupation of Lindesay. (Orwell & Peter Phillips Architects, 2004, 136 (summary statement of significance only – for full statement see that document).

The principal cultural significance of Lindesay is that:

- it is Australia's first picturesque Gothic villa of the type advocated by contemporary English taste in the 1820s;
- the drawing room chimney piece is probably the earliest surviving example of Louis Revival style in Australian domestic architecture;
- it was the first house to be built on Darling Point after the subdivision of Darling Point into suburban allotments in 1833 and is associated with people prominent in Australia's history, viz C. D. Riddell, Sir Thomas Mitchell, Sir Charles Nicholson, Bt., William Bradley and John Macintosh;

The place is also significant because:

- it is a good example of the pattern book design method of the pre-Victorian period and possibly the oldest suburban villa architectural type surviving in NSW;
- it is reasonably intact and contains numerous features and details which demonstrate the architectural taste and social customs of the time it was built;
- it contains one of the finest suites of reception rooms in Australia, arranged in what at the time was an informal and novel way;
- it is one of the few surviving houses that were landmarks around Sydney Harbour in the 1830s and 1840s that can still be viewed from the harbour;
- it contains for Sydney a rare example of colonial basement kitchen and offices which was still in use up until c.1914;

Apart from its historic associations particularly relating to the sun dial and the remaining sections of wall, the garden is only significant as a setting for the important house;

The south wing of the house is only significant as being part of the continuing history of the house and incorporating earlier work.

Lindesay was listed on the New South Wales State Heritage Register on 2 April 1999.

== See also ==
- Australian residential architectural styles
