= Darling Point =

- Suburb
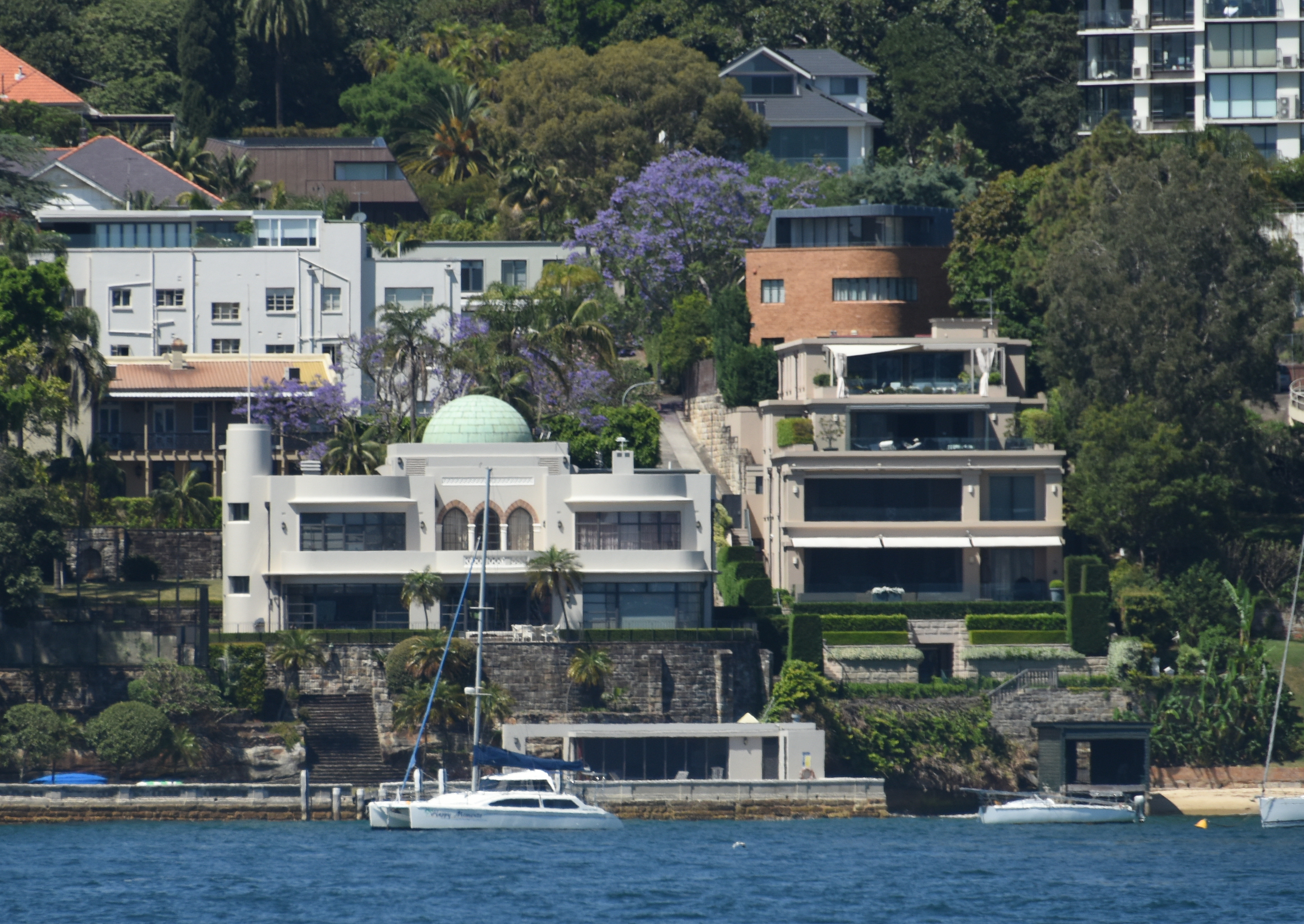
- Darling Point

- Interactive map of Darling Point
- Country: Australia
- State: New South Wales
- City: Sydney
- LGA: Woollahra Council
- Location: 4 km (2.5 mi) E of Sydney CBD
- Established: 1833

Government
  - State electorate: Vaucluse
  - Federal division: Wentworth

Area
  - Total: 0.67 km^{2} (0.26 sq mi)
- Elevation: 46 m (151 ft)

Population
  - Total: 3,977 (SAL 2021)
- Postcode: 2027
Suburbs around Darling Point
	Port Jackson
Elizabeth Bay	Darling Point	Double Bay
Rushcutters Bay	Edgecliff	Woollahra

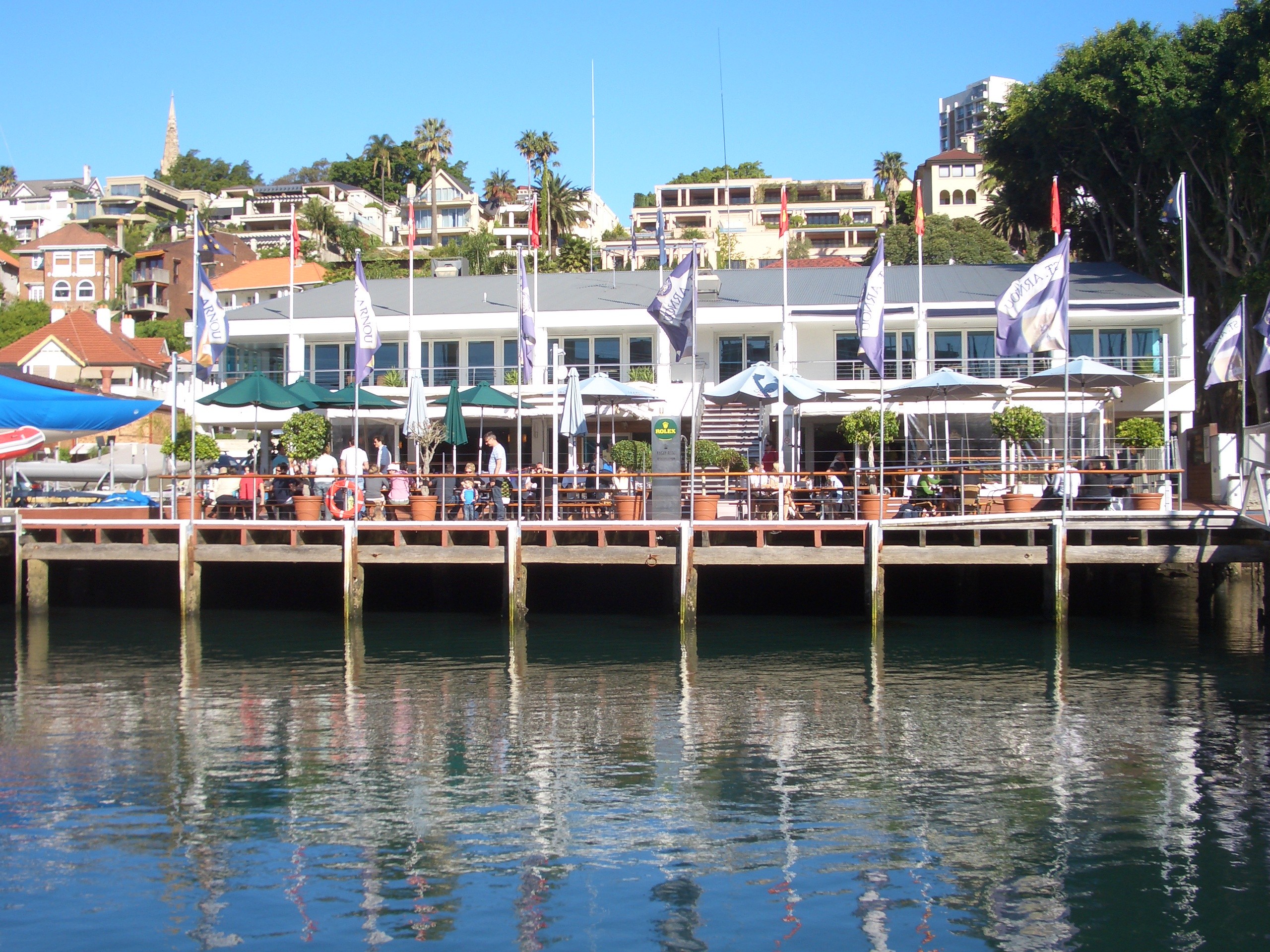
Cruising Yacht Club of Australia

Darling Point is a harbourside eastern suburb of Sydney, Australia. It is 4 kilometres east of the Sydney central business district and is part of the local government area of Woollahra Council.

Darling Point is bounded by Sydney Harbour to the north, Double Bay to the east, Edgecliff to the south and Rushcutters Bay to the west. Darling Point, renowned for its desirable and expensive real estate, is mostly residential and regarded as one of the most exclusive and prestigious suburbs in Australia.

== History ==
What is now the Darling Point area was originally known as Eurambi, Yarranabbi, Yarrandabbi and Yaranabe by the local Aboriginal people. It was named Darling Point in recognition of Elizabeth Darling, the wife of New South Wales Governor Ralph Darling.

During the 2000 Summer Olympics, Darling Point hosted the sailing events.

== Transport ==
Darling Point Road follows the ridge of the headland that is Darling Point. Mona Road and Greenoaks Avenue act as two other main access roads to the suburb. New Beach Road runs between the western boundary of the suburb and Rushcutters Bay Park. Darling Point is served by Transdev John Holland bus route 328. Darling Point ferry wharf provides access to Double Bay ferry services. Darling Point is also serviced by the nearby Edgecliff railway station.

== Parks ==
McKell Park was originally the site of the now-demolished Canonbury House, but is now a public park. Situated at the northern end of Darling Point Road, it has panoramic views of Sydney Harbour and is a popular location for picnics and weddings. It also provides access to Darling Point's ferry stop.

"The Drill Hall" forms part of the Sir David Martin Reserve and was previously part of the Royal Australian Navy base, HMAS Rushcutter. The Drill hall is one of the oldest-surviving Australian military buildings and was originally located on Bennelong Point, now the location of the Sydney Opera House.

== Places of worship ==
Saint Mark's Anglican Church in Darling Point Road was designed by Edmund Blacket in 1852 and is now a popular wedding venue. It has hosted weddings such as Elton John's first wedding and the fictional wedding in the film Muriel's Wedding. The rectory, also designed by Blacket, is listed on the local government heritage register.

== Landmarks ==
=== Craigend ===
Situated close to McKell Park, Craigend is a mansion constructed in the Moorish and Art Deco styles in 1935, including a pair of doors from an ancient mosque in Zanzibar and a traditional Japanese garden. In 1948, the property was acquired by the US government as the official residence of the Consul-General. It has since returned to the private sector. In 1975, it served as the shooting location for the villain's lair in the Hong Kong / Australian co-production The Man from Hong Kong. The house is heritage-listed.

=== Carthona ===
Built in 1841 for the Surveyor-General Sir Thomas Mitchell, Carthona is a harborside sandstone mansion located at the end of Carthona Avenue. With its panoramic water views across Double Bay, to Point Piper, and north toward Manly, it is considered one of Sydney's most-valuable properties. It is currently held by descendants of Philip Bushell, the tea merchant, who died at the home in 1954. It is heritage-listed.

=== Glanworth ===
In 1966, James Fairfax paid $240,000 to purchase Glanworth in Lindsay Avenue. The house designed by Joseph Alexander Kethel had been built in 1916 for Peter Britz, an American from Buffalo, New York, on a lot carved from the Lindsay Estate and was originally known as Youbri. It is a rare example of an American plantation-style residence with deep verandas and oversized antebellum concrete columns and piers. Faifax owned the house for 28 years and sold it for $8.5 million to a Singaporean hotel magnate who sold it to Kerry Stokes for $9.5 million in 1998.

== Heritage listings ==
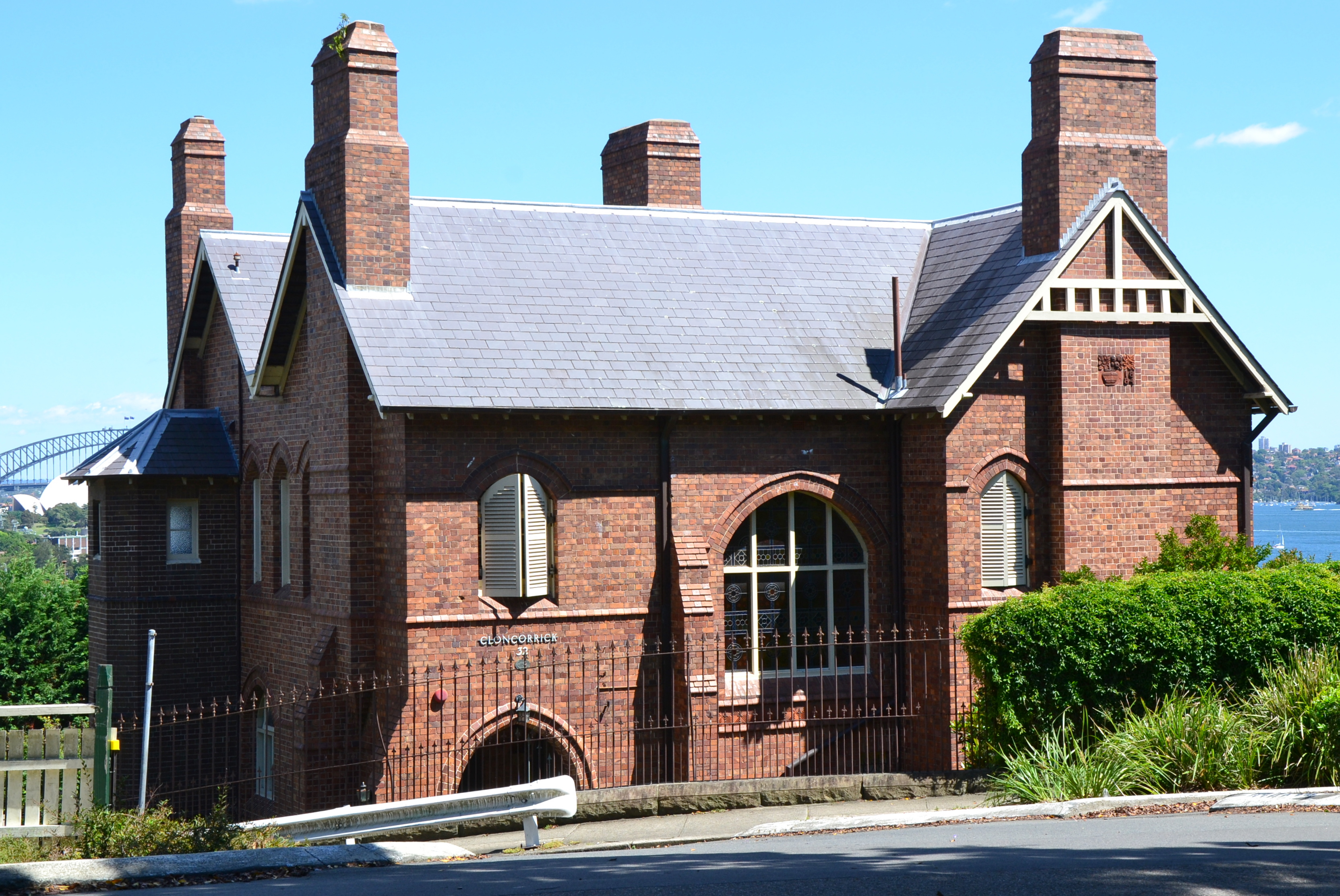
Cloncorrick, designed by John Horbury Hunt

Swifts

Darling Point has a number of heritage-listed sites, including:

- 1a Carthona Avenue: Lindesay
- 68 Darling Point Road: The Swifts
- 103 Darling Point Road: Babworth House
- 11–21 Greenoaks Avenue: Bishopscourt

In additional, the following buildings are on the (now defunct) Register of the National Estate.

- Cloncorrick, Annandale Street
- Callooa and garden, Bennett Avenue
- Carthona, Carthona Avenue
- Mona, Mona Road

== Clubs ==
The Cruising Yacht Club of Australia, Australia's premier yacht club, is situated near Rushcutters Bay Park and runs the annual Sydney to Hobart Yacht Race.

== Population ==
=== Demographics ===
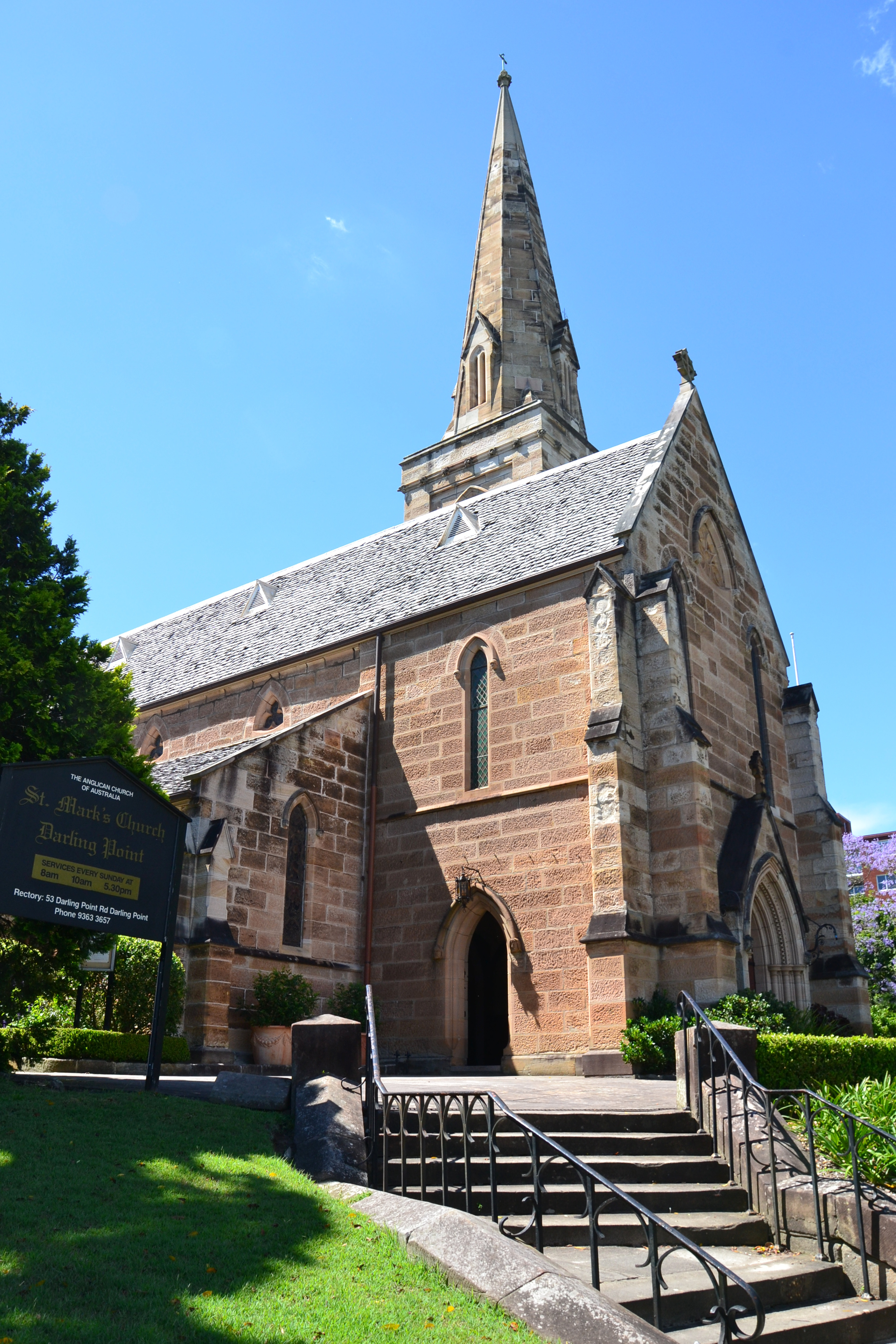
St Marks Anglican Church

At the 2021 census, the population of Darling Point was 3,977. The most common ancestries in Darling Point were English (36.2%), Australian (23.4%), Irish (13.5%), Scottish 11.1% and Chinese 5.8%. 59.5% of residents were born in Australia. The most common other countries of birth were England 6.1%, South Africa 3.3% and New Zealand 3.1%. 80.3% of people spoke only English at home.

== Notable residents ==
- Harry Rickards, (1843–1911) English-Australian vaudeville artist and theatre impresario, and his wife Kate Rickards, former trapeze artist and later a musical theatre actress
