= Phoebe Wesche =

Australian charity worker

Phoebe Ellen Wesché
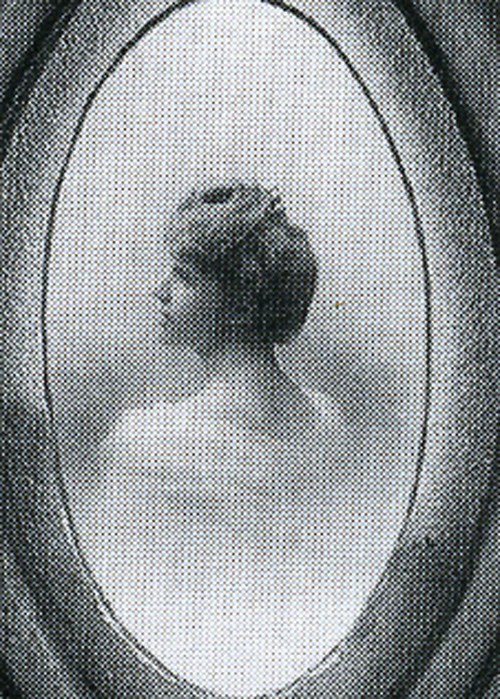
- Born: Phoebe Ellen Twynam; 10 June 1871; Goulburn, New South Wales, Australia
- Died: 21 August 1950 (aged 79); Riversdale, Goulburn, New South Wales, Australia
- Known for: Charity work
- Spouse: Awdry Gordon Wesché
- Relatives: Lady Mary Windeyer (aunt)

Phoebe Ellen Wesché, born Phoebe Ellen Twynam (10 June 1871 – 21 August 1950) was an Australian charity worker who founded Sydney's Queen's Club in 1912.

== Life ==
Wesché was born in Goulburn. Her father Edward Twynam was a surveyor for England and her mother Emily Rose (born Bolton) had like her been born in New South Wales and she was an artist and woodcarver. Her mother's sister was Lady Mary Windeyer who was a suffragette and charity worker. Phoebe was brought up in the large house of Riversdale which had been built as an inn which her family bought in 1875 after leasing it for several years. In 1888 her father became the Surveyor-General of New South Wales.

She was interested in horse riding and racing and in 1901 she married, Awdry Gordon Wesché at the local church of St Nicholas's Anglican Church in Goulburn. He was a shipping manager with the P & O company and they enjoyed going fishing together. She served several charities. For instance, Mrs Aubrey Withers was the founder of the Bush Book Club in 1909 and her good friend Lady Ida Poore became its first President and Wesche served as its vice-president. The organisation was not a club per se but it organised the sending of books to those who did not have access to a library or mechanics institute. Two years later, the New South Wales Bush Nursing Association was founded in 1911 and it received state support in 1912. She served on the council of the Australian Bush Nursing Association.

Wesche was later a founder and vice-president of Sydney's Queen's Club which started in 1912.

After her father's death in 1923 her two unmarried sisters Edith and Alice Joan, who was a nursing sister, lived at the family home of Riversdale. In 1939 Phoebe's husband died and she too went to live with them. All three sisters lived at Riversdale for the rest of their lives. Wesche died there in 1950. When the youngest sister Alice Joan died in 1967 the property was sold to the National Trust of Australia.
