= Darling Point Road =

Road in Sydney, New South Wales, Australia

- Footpath on Darling Point Road
- Country: Australia
- State: New South Wales
- City: Sydney
- LGA: Woollahra Council
- Location: 4 km (2.5 mi) from CBD

Government
  - State electorate: Vaucluse
  - Federal division: Wentworth
- Postcode: 2027

Darling Point Road is one of the main roads within the suburb Darling Point in the Eastern Suburbs of Sydney, New South Wales, Australia. It was widened in the 1920s. It has had notable houses on its traverse through Darling Point.

Beginning on the northern cusp of Edgecliff at the intersection of New South Head Road, Darling Point Road terminates on the most northern part of the suburb, next to McKell Park. Darling Point Road passes St Marks Anglican Church, situated on the highest point of the ridge, here it intersects Mona Road and Greenoaks Avenue at a small roundabout. As Darling Point has magnificent views of Sydney Harbour in all but the southern direction it is a wealthy area, many fine homes and apartments line Darling Point Road, and the entire suburb. It is possibly one of the most leafy roads in the Eastern Suburbs of Sydney.
