= Toorale National Park =

National park in New South Wales, Australia

- IUCN category II (national park)
- Location within New South Wales
- Location: New South Wales
- Nearest city: Bourke
- Coordinates: 30°15′54″S 145°24′04″E
- Area: 308.66 km^{2} (119.17 sq mi)
- Established: 26 November 2010
- Governing body: NSW National Parks and Wildlife Service; Kurnu-Baakandji people
- Website: Official website

The Toorale National Park is a protected national park in the far-west region of New South Wales, in eastern Australia. The 30,866-hectare (76,270-acre) national park is located approximately 80 kilometres (50 mi) southwest of Bourke, at the junction of the Darling and Warrego rivers. The national park is located adjacent to both the Darling River and the Gundabooka National Park, located to the south-east of the park, and the Toorale State Conservation Area, located to the north-west of the park. The park is jointly managed by the NSW National Parks and Wildlife Service and the local indigenous Kurnu-Baakandji people.

== Features ==
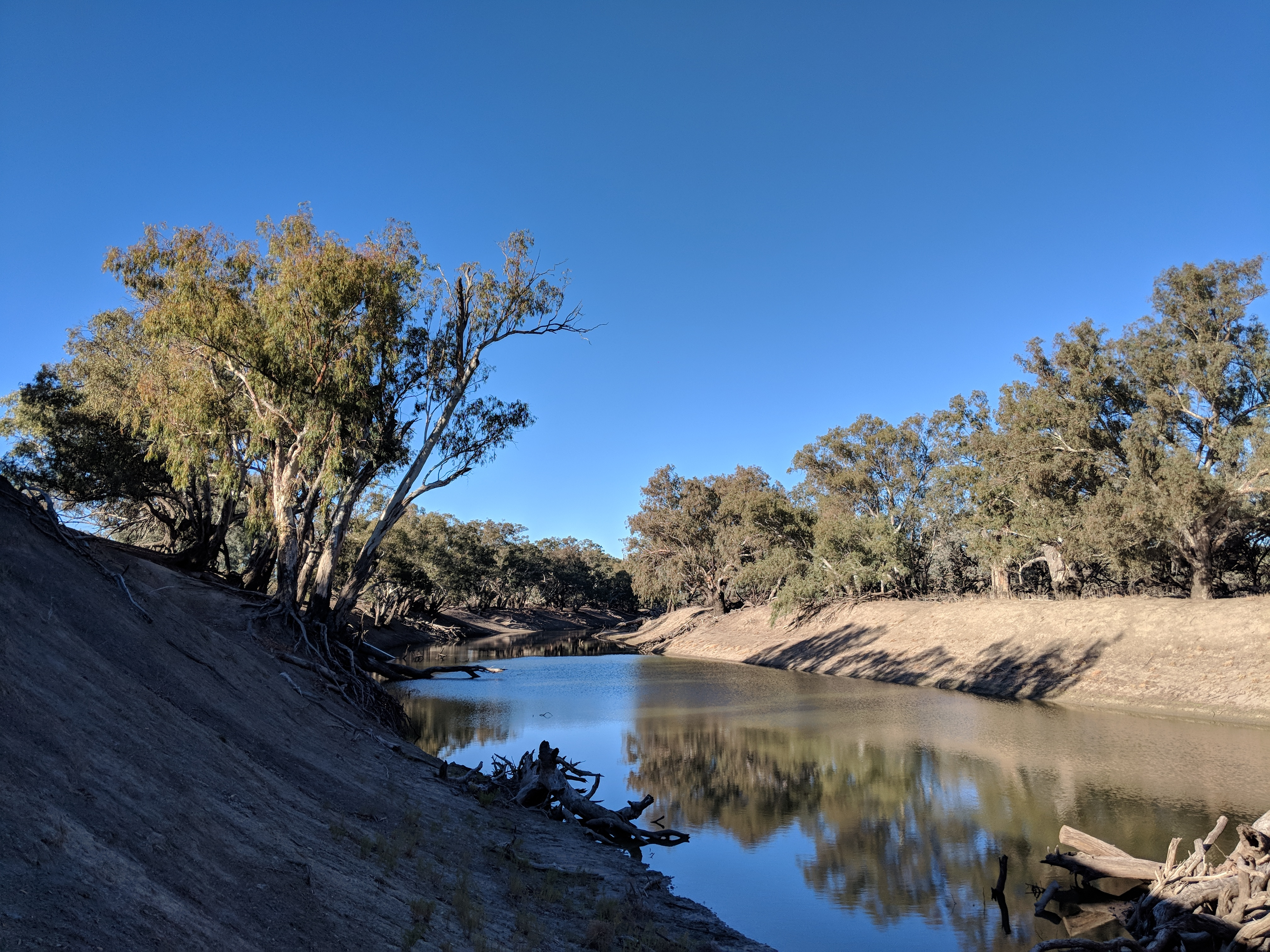
Darling River at Toorale National Park

The Toorale National Park consists of land that was previously part of Toorale Station, used for irrigated cropping and grazing. Toorale has a broadly flat landscape with extensive floodplains, and smaller areas of low ridges, riparian strips, and two notable peaks. Small ephemeral lakes (gilgais) occur in depressions and swamps, whilst historic water management practices have created a vast wetland ecosystem on the park.

== Flora ==
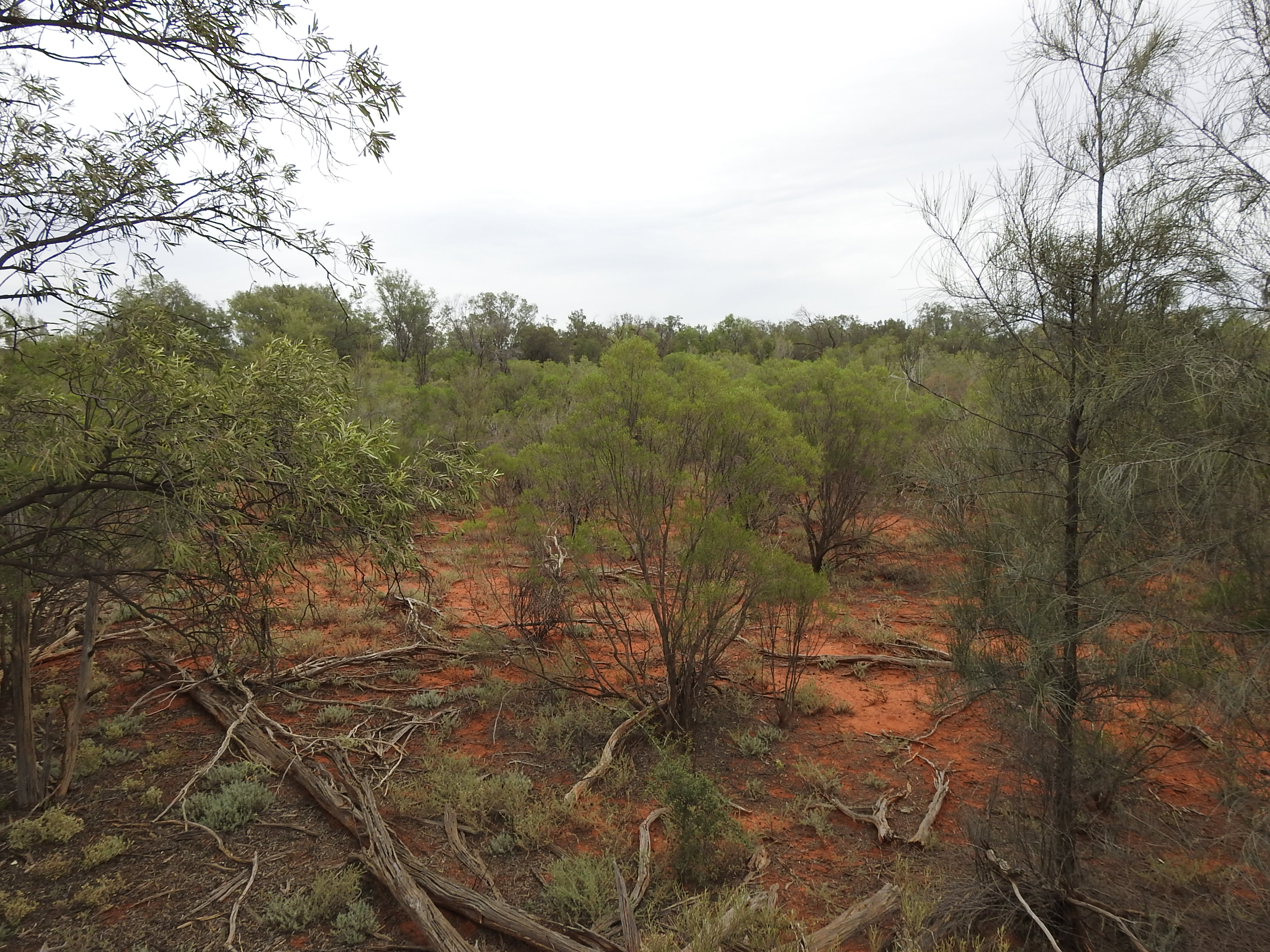
Toorale National Park vegetation (2021).

Toorale has diverse vegetation with 27 vegetation communities described and mapped. Of these, inland floodplain shrublands are the dominant community, consisting of lignum shrublands, confined swamps dominated by cane grass, eurah shrublands, riverine chenopod shrublands and low chenopod shrublands. Low chenopod shrubland is the most extensive vegetation community on Toorale, covering over 40 per cent of the park and is a highly variable community.

The banks and internal river bends of the Darling River are lined by a tall open forest of river red gum. Outer bends of the Darling and Warrego rivers and tributaries are lined by coolibah open woodland, which extends onto the surrounding alluvial floodplains. Floodplain woodlands also include those characterised by black box.

Areas associated with semi-permanent water support shallow freshwater sedgelands. Bimble box grows in periodically flooded depressions on sandplains and alluvial plains. On dryland areas there are extensive woodlands of belah, black oak, western rosewood and leopardwood. A relatively large expanse of Whitewood–Western Rosewood low woodland occurs on the stony tablelands. There are small patches of supplejack dominated woodland and Western Peneplain woodlands dominated by coolibah and beefwood or ironwood. Gidgee and occasionally Whitewood tall shrublands, mulga (Acacia spp.) communities and Aeolian dunefields comprising patches of gum coolibah woodland also occur.

== Fauna ==
=== Mammals ===
Within the combined area of national park and the Toorale State Conservation Area, at least 28 species of mammal have been recorded. The terrestrial species include the red kangaroo, western grey kangaroo and eastern grey kangaroo, as well as the common dunnart and short-beaked echidna. Several bat species have been recorded, including Gould's wattled bat, the lesser long-eared bat, inland broad-nosed bat, little broad-nosed bat, yellow-bellied sheath-tailed bat and little pied bat.

Several introduced pest species occur, including the European fox, European rabbit, brown hare, feral cat, feral goat, feral pig, European cow and House mouse.

=== Reptiles and amphibians ===
At least 57 species of reptile have been recorded within the combined area of national park and the Toorale State Conservation Area. These include the Murray River turtle, Interior blind snake, leopard Ctenotus, ringed brown snake, sand goanna, Bynoe's gecko and Central bearded dragon.

Seventeen species of amphibian have also been recorded including the broad-palmed frog, desert froglet and rough frog.

== Gallery ==
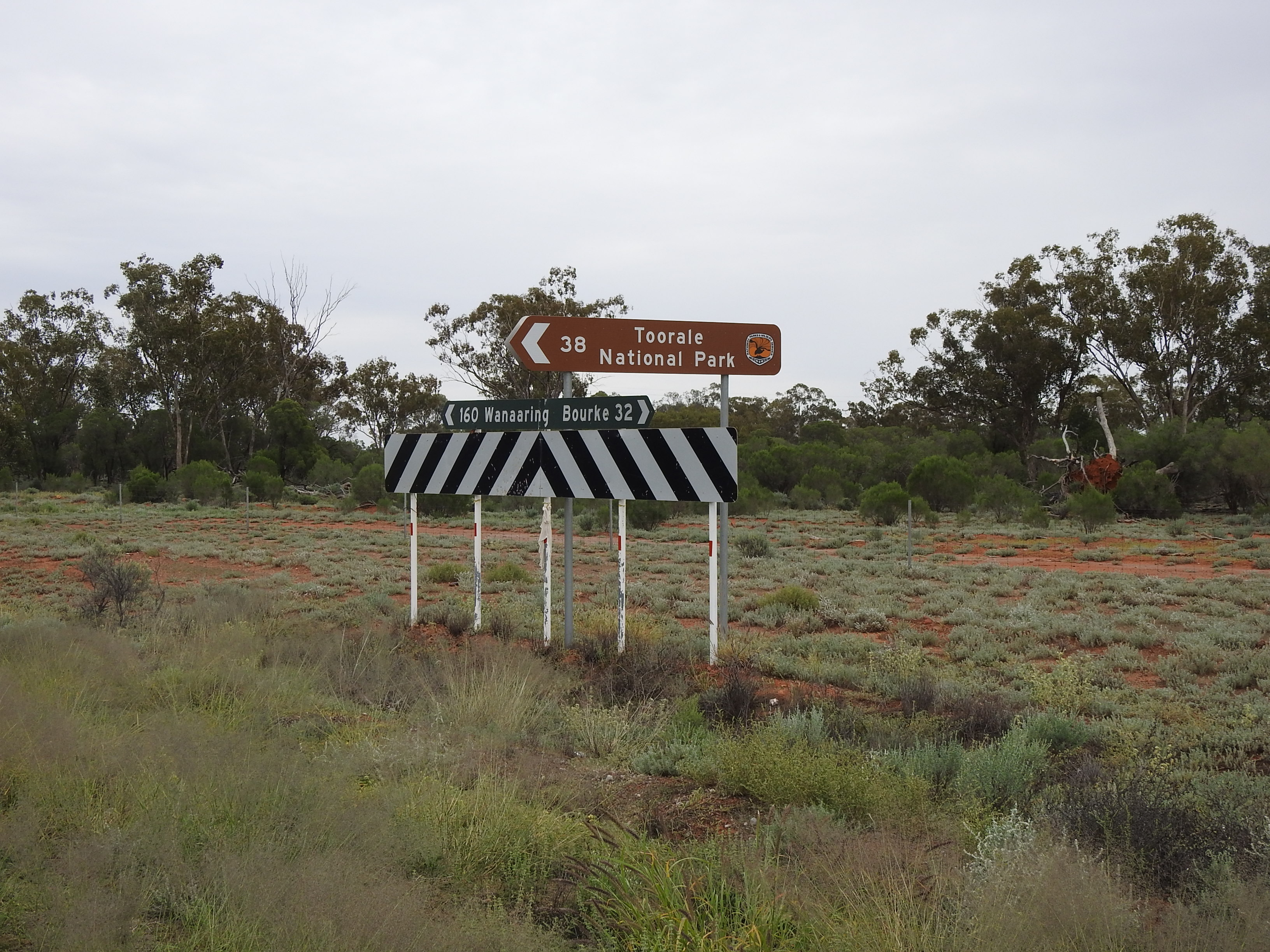
Toorale National Park sign on Bourke–Milparinka Road (2021).

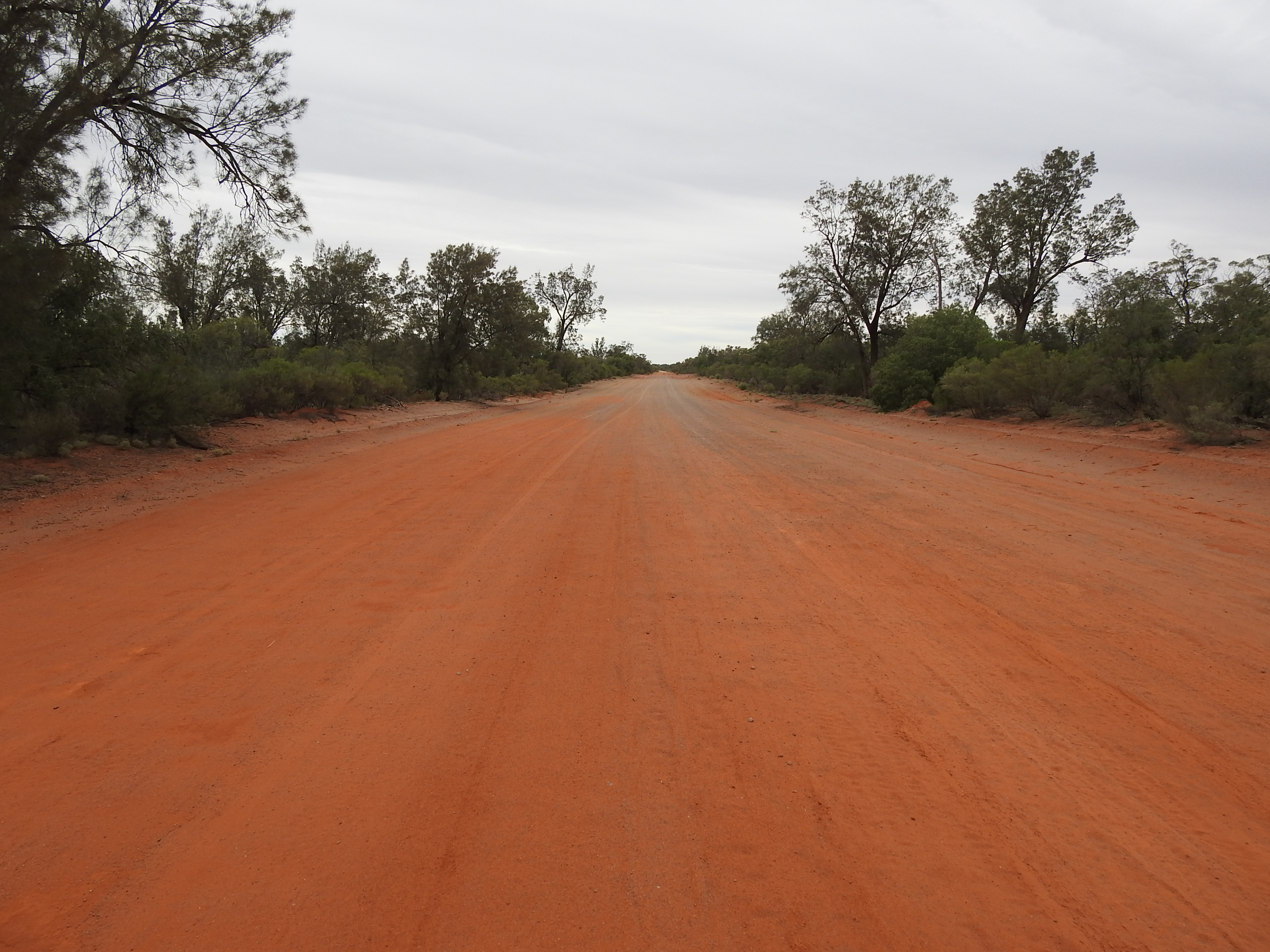
Toorale National Park entrance, Toorale Road (2021).

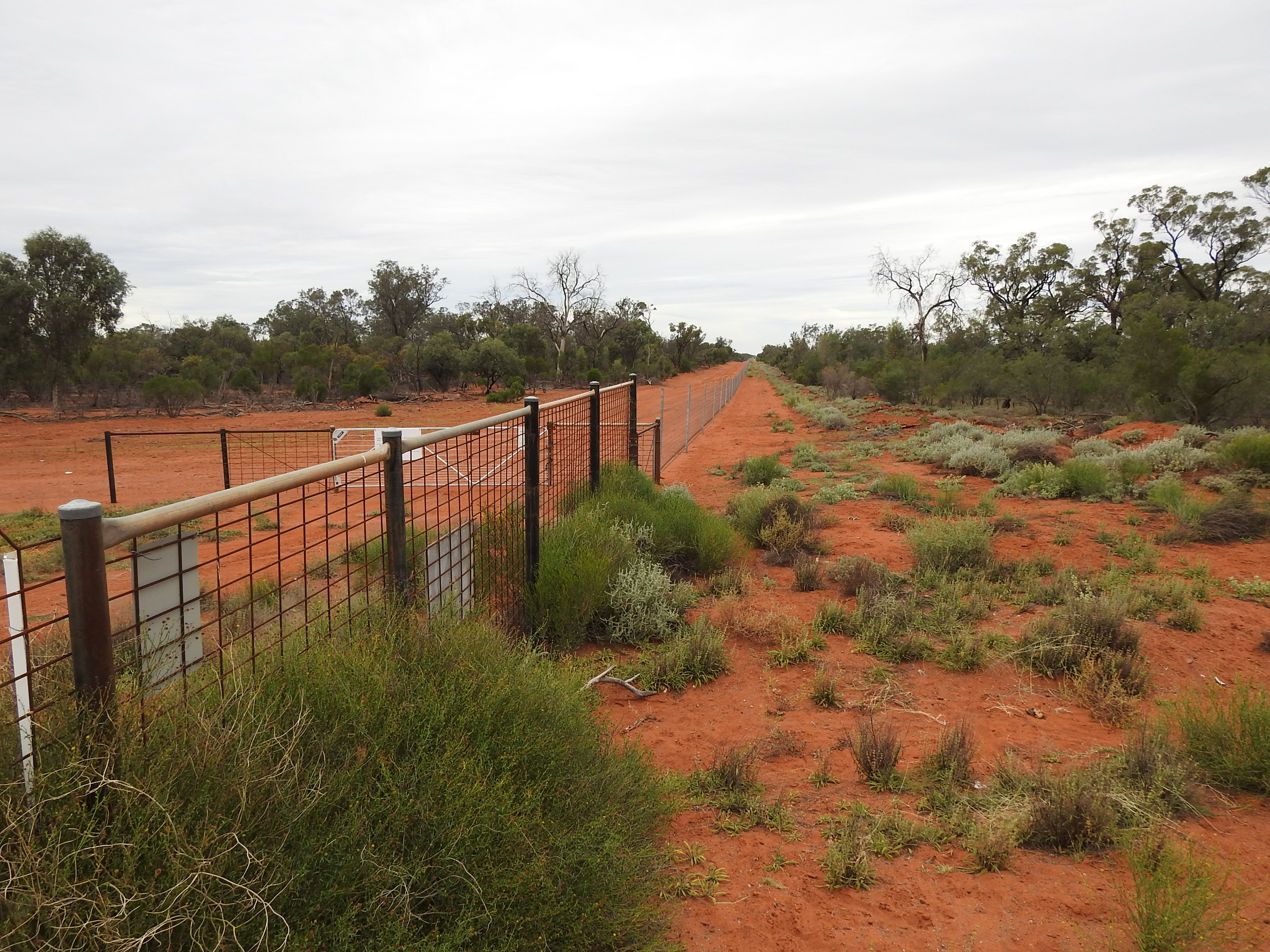
Toorale National Park stock fence (2021).

== See also ==
- Protected areas of New South Wales
