= Beatrice Bligh =

Australian gardener (1916–1973)

Beatrice Bligh FRHS
- Bligh in 1972
- Born: Rosemary Beatrice Gordon; 27 August 1916; Edgecliff, New South Wales, Australia
- Died: 18 January 1973 (aged 56); Goulburn, New South Wales, Australia
- Education: Ascham School; Frensham School
- Occupation: Gardener
- Years active: 1941–1973
- Notable work: Pejar Park
- Spouse: Francis Leonard Bligh (m. 1941)
- Children: 4

Rosemary Beatrice Bligh (née Gordon; 27 September 1916 – 18 January 1973) was an Australian gardener and writer. Credited as an important influence on Australian gardening by the Australian Garden History Society, her garden in the Southern Tablelands won The Sydney Morning Herald's 1965 garden competition.

== Biography ==
Rosemary Beatrice Gordon was born on 27 September 1916 in the Edgecliff neighbourhood of Sydney. She was the third of five children of grazier James Henry Forbes Gordon and his wife Gladys Noel Lydia Bowker. She was educated at the Ascham School in Sydney and the Frensham School in Mittagong. On 1 March 1941, she married Francis Leonard Bligh, a grazier and Royal Australian Air Force flying officer, at the St Philip's Anglican Church in Bungendore. They had four children together. Bligh moved to her husband's farm at Pejar Park near Goulburn. She managed the property while he was serving in World War II.

Inspired by her grandfather's garden in Braidwood and by Edna Walling, Bligh decided to create a garden at Pejar Park. Though the local terrain made gardening difficult, Bligh worked on it with minimal assistance. She began the garden using plants donated by Winifred West, and she later became skilled at collecting and cultivating wild plants. The garden was described as a "garden of surprises" by the Australian Dictionary of Biography, and featured "shady trees, smooth, weed-free lawns, raised beds filled with hardy perennials, a long, white wall with espaliered apples and pears, a wistaria-covered pergola, a separate vegetable garden and a willow-shaded pool". In 1965, it won first place in The Sydney Morning Herald's garden competition, and placed highly in future competitions.

In 1968, Bligh wrote the book Down to Earth, which provided guidance and outlined her experiences with creating a garden in the Southern Tablelands. She also studied gardens in dry areas similar to the region, including Spain, India, and Iran. In 1973, she wrote Cherish the Earth, which documented the history of gardening in Australia. According to the Australian Garden History Society, Bligh's books had a significant impact on gardening in Australia.

Bligh died of cancer at the hospital in Goulburn on 18 January 1973. Bligh was a member of the gardening committee of the National Trust of Australia (NSW) and was a fellow of the Royal Horticultural Society. She was also a member of the Royal Sydney Golf Club and the Ski Club of Australia.

== Bibliography ==
- Down to Earth. Sydney: Angus & Robertson. 1968.
- Cherish the Earth: The Story of Gardening in Australia. Sydney: Ure Smith. 1973. ISBN 978-0-908197-32-3.
