= Florinda Katharine Ogilvie =

Australian social worker and educator

- Born: 12 January 1902; Glen Innes, New South Wales
- Died: 27 January 1983 (aged 81); Darlinghurst, Sydney
- Education: University of Sydney
- Occupations: educator and social worker
- Employer: Rachel Forster Hospital
- Known for: central to the development of Social Work in Australia

Florinda Katharine Ogilvie MBE (12 January 1902 – 27 January 1983) was an Australian social worker and educator. She became a qualified hospital almoner, and she founded the almoners' professional association. She went on to lecture in medical social work at the University of Sydney. She is credited with being central to the development of Social Work in Australia.

She led the organisation that sent the Australia women's national field hockey team on their first international tour in 1930.

== Life ==
Ogilvie was born in Glen Innes, New South Wales in 1902. Her Australian-born parents were Ethel Maude (born Mylne) and William Frederick Ogilvie who was a grazier. She was their penultimate child of six. She went to Gosford School for Girls and then joined Frensham School in 1918/1919. She went on to live at the Women's College of the University of Sydney where she studied history. She graduated with an honours degree in 1924 and she exercised her fluency in French when she went to Europe that year.

The Rachel Forster Hospital for Women and Children had opened in 1922 and in 1926 she became its executive officer with the job title of secretary.

Ogilvie led the All Australia Women's Hockey Association from 1926 and in 1930 she went with them when they undertook their first international tour. Australia's women's national field hockey team played their first international match on foreign soil that year when they went to South Africa and Rhodesia to compete in an Empire tournament.

In 1933 she went to England where she studied for 15 months to qualify as a hospital almoner. She returned to the Rachel Forster Hospital and while she was there, she was pivotal in the creation of the New South Wales Institute of Hospital Almoners at her alma mater. She and Helen Rees had a poor opinion of Australia's training for almoners, and they founded the Australian Association of Hospital Almoners. Ogilvie became she its first President in 1942 and served for four years. She created the idea of Social work for members of the Australian military funded by the Australian Comforts Fund in NSW during World War Two. From 1941 and for the whole of the 1940s she was a Member of the Child Welfare Advisory Council and from 1943 to 1949 was a Fellow of the University of Sydney Senate.

Ogilvie returned to the University of Sydney in 1954 as a lecturer in medical social work and this became a permanent position in 1957. She retired at the end of 1964 as the profession of social worker became even more accepted.

Ogilvie died in 1983 in the Sydney suburb of Darlinghurst. Her papers are held by her alma mater. After her death a fund was established by retired social workers because she had played such a key role in the establishment of social work in Australia. The money that was raised created a scholarship in her name in 1988. The fund still (in 2024) pays out about $10,000 to support post graduate work.
