= Exceptional Family Member Program =

The Exceptional Family Member Program or EFMP is a mandatory U.S. Department of Defense enrollment program that works with other military and civilian agencies to provide comprehensive and coordinated community support, housing, educational, medical, and personnel services worldwide to U.S. military families with special needs.

Service members on active duty enroll in the program when they have a family member with a physical, developmental, or emotional or mental disorder requiring specialized services so their needs can be considered in the military personnel assignment process.

Family members must be screened and enrolled, if eligible, when the service member is on assignment instructions to an OCONUS (outside the continental United States) area for which command sponsorship/family member travel is authorized, and the service member elects to serve the accompanied tour. This screening consists of medical records review for all family members, and developmental screening for all children 72 months (6 years) of age and younger.

Service members are responsible for keeping their EFMP enrollment current as exceptional family member conditions change, or at least every three years, whichever comes first.

The U.S. Coast Guard does not participate in the EFMP program since it is not a Department of Defense branch. Instead, USCG members are required to register in the Coast Guard Special Needs Program by contacting work-life staff at the nearest Integrated Support Command.

Each service has its own specific program governed by the following references:

- Army - Regulation 608-75
- Navy - OPNAVINST 1754.2
- Marine Corps - MCO P1754.4A
- Air Force - AFI 40-701 Medical Support to Family Member Relocation and Exceptional Family Member Program (EFMP)
- Coast Guard - COMDTINST 1754.7A

== See also ==
- Extended Care Health Option
- Social Work in the Military
