= Mancell Kirby =

Australian harpsichordist (1897–1996)

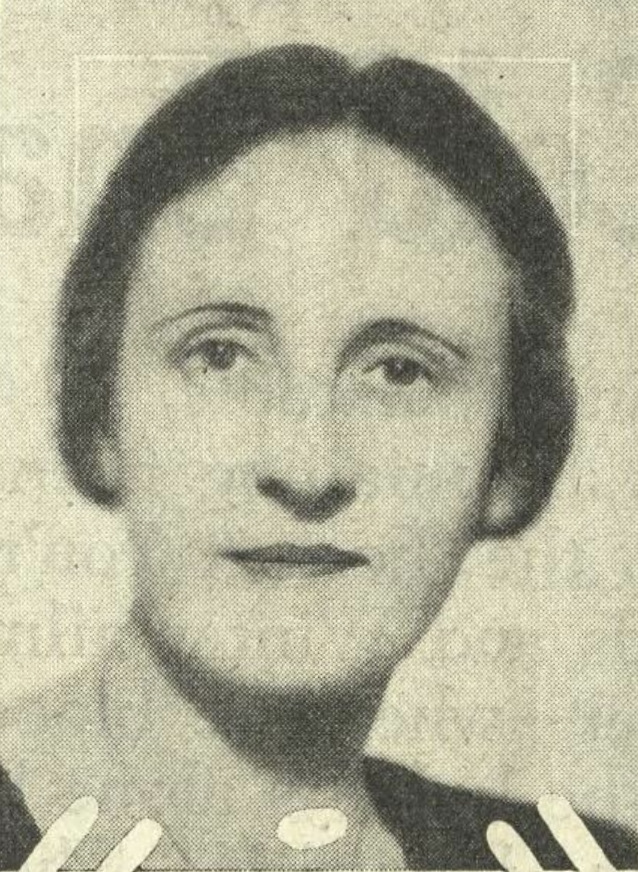
- Kirby in 1938

Background information
- Birth name: Mancell Flo Kirby
- Born: 24 January 1897; Ballarat, Victoria, Australia
- Died: 29 February 1996 (aged 99); Kew, Victoria, Australia
- Occupation(s): Music educator, accompanist
- Instrument: harpsichord

Mancell Flo Kirby (24 January 1897 – 29 February 1996) was an Australian harpsichordist, accompanist and music educator.

== Early life and education ==
Mancell Flo Kirby was born in Ballarat, Victoria on 24 January 1897 to Thomas Henry and Christiana Harriett Kirby (née Sinclair), who had married a year earlier. Her sister, Ellen Norine, was born three years later. The family moved to Melbourne, where her father, a commercial traveller, died late in 1900, leaving his widow £297. In 1908 Christiana married George Leighton Barrow, who brought up his two step-daughters after Christiana's death in 1911.

Kirby attended Canterbury State School and from 1912 to 1914 Fintona Presbyterian Girls' Grammar School in Camberwell. Her step-father married Mitta Nicholls. He died in 1922, leaving Mitta, a son Leighton and his two step-daughters Mancell and Norine.

== Career ==
On graduating from the Albert Street Conservatorium, East Melbourne with a Diploma in Music (1918), she was employed at Frensham, Mittagong as a piano teacher from 1919 to 1923.
