= Extended Care Health Option =

The Extended Care Health Option or ECHO is a supplemental coverage program offered by TRICARE to dependents of members of the uniformed services of the United States with a qualifying disability.

== Eligibility ==
ECHO benefits are available with a qualifying condition to a TRICARE-eligible child or spouse of an active duty uniformed service member.

The following are qualifying conditions under ECHO:

- A serious physical disability
- Moderate or severe mental retardation
- An extraordinary physical or psychological condition of such complexity that the beneficiary is homebound

ECHO enrollment/registration

TRICARE ECHO requires all eligible beneficiaries do the following:

- Present evidence that the sponsor is an active duty service member in one of the Uniform Services.
- Enroll in the Exceptional Family Member Program (EFMP) that is available through their service branch.
- Submit the required Enrollment Forms: DD Form 2792 Exceptional Family Member Medical Summary, DD Form 2792-1 Exceptional Family Member Special Education/Early Intervention
- Register with their regional contractor to obtain ECHO benefit authorization.

For more information about the EFMP, Department of Defense beneficiaries may visit the Military Homefront Website. United States Coast Guard beneficiaries should contact their regional Work-Life office to inquire about the Coast Guard Special Needs Program.

== Coverage ==
In addition to coverage received via the primary TRICARE plan, TRICARE ECHO benefits may include:

- Special education
- Medical and rehabilitative services
- Transportation under certain circumstances
- Training to use assistive technology devices
- Institutional care when a residential environment is required
- Assistive services, such as those from a qualified interpreter or translator, for beneficiaries whose visual or hearing impairment qualifies them for ECHO benefits
- Durable equipment, including adaptation and maintenance
- In-home medical services through TRICARE ECHO Extended Home Health Care (EHHC)
- In-home respite care services (Note: Only one of the following respite care benefits may be used in a calendar month.)
  - ECHO Respite care-16 hours per month when receiving other authorized ECHO benefits
  - EHHC Respite care-up to 40 hours per week (eight hours per day, five days per week) if homebound

== Limitations ==
The ECHO benefit provides a government cost-share limit of $2,500 per month, per eligible family member. In addition to other TRICARE ECHO benefits, beneficiaries who are homebound may qualify for extended in-home health care services. The $2,500 cost share does not apply to the ECHO Home Health Care (EHHC) as there is a benefit cap.

For certain benefits, ECHO requires recipients to first use public funds and facilities to the extent that they are available and adequate.

Under ECHO, sponsors must pay part of the monthly authorized expenses for their family members, based on their pay grade, ranging from $25 to $75 a month for all enlisted and most officers.

== Program authority ==
The program was originally authorized in Section 701(g) of the National Defense Authorization Act for Fiscal Year 2002 (Public Law 107-107) and is codified in law in 10 USC 1079 (d) through (g). Department of Defense regulations for the ECHO program are found at 32 CFR 199.5 after being published in the August 20, 2004 Federal Register (69 FR 51559).

== See also ==
- Medical service corps
