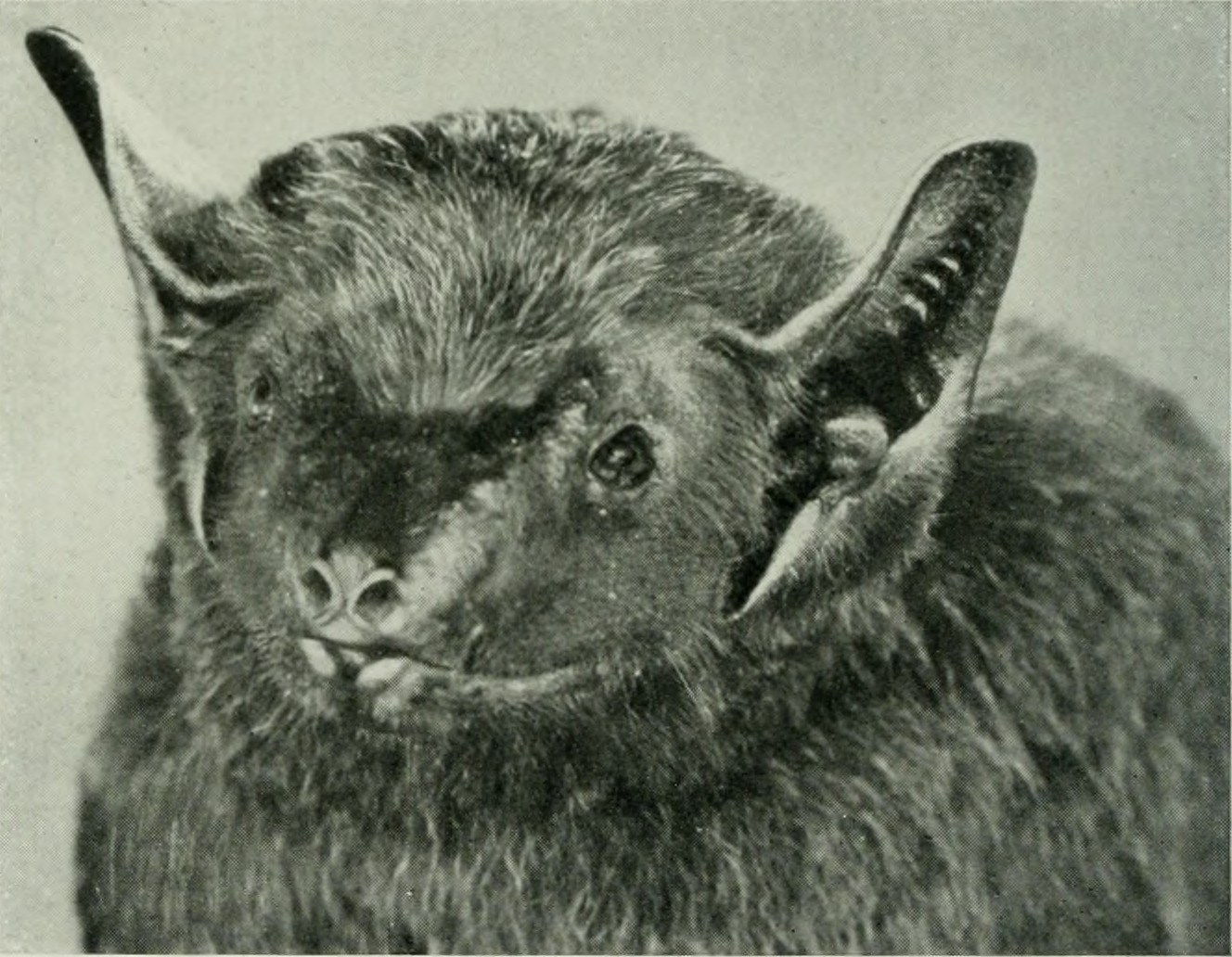

Scientific classification
- Kingdom: Animalia
- Phylum: Chordata
- Class: Mammalia
- Order: Chiroptera
- Family: Emballonuridae
- Genus: Saccolaimus; Temminck, 1838

Type species
- Taphozous saccolaimus Temminck, 1838

Species
- See text

= Saccolaimus =

Genus of bats

Saccolaimus is a genus of the family Emballonuridae, small insectivorous bats with distinctive sheathtails and pouches at the wrist.

The species have been placed with genus Taphozous, in subgenus Taphozous, although an elevation to genus accords with a 1991 revision of Australian emballonurids. The type species is Taphozous saccolaimus, published by Coenraad Jacob Temminck in 1838, elevated as generic combination Saccolaimus saccolaimus in this arrangement. The genus also follows Temminck's description of that species. A revision by George Dobson in 1876 erected the genus name Taphonycteris, once recognised and later suppressed as a synonym to give priority to Temminck's earlier description. A key to the genus was provided in its 1991 revision by Christian Chimimba and Darrell Kitchener.

The genus Saccolaimus Temminck, 1838 contains the following taxa:

- species Saccolaimus flaviventris (Peters, 1867). yellow-bellied pouched or sheath-tailed bat
- species †Saccolaimus kenyensis (Gunnell & Manthi, 2019)
- species Saccolaimus mixtus Troughton, 1925. Troughton's pouched bat, Papuan sheath-tailed bat
- species Saccolaimus peli. Pel's pouched bat
- species Saccolaimus saccolaimus Temminck, 1838. naked-rumped pouched bat

The diversity of this genus in Australia, identified as species S. saccolaimus and S. flaviventris, is poorly resolved and requires re-examination of records.
