= Helen Blaxland =

Australian charity fundraiser, heritage conservationist, flower arranger and writer

Dame Helen Blaxland DBE
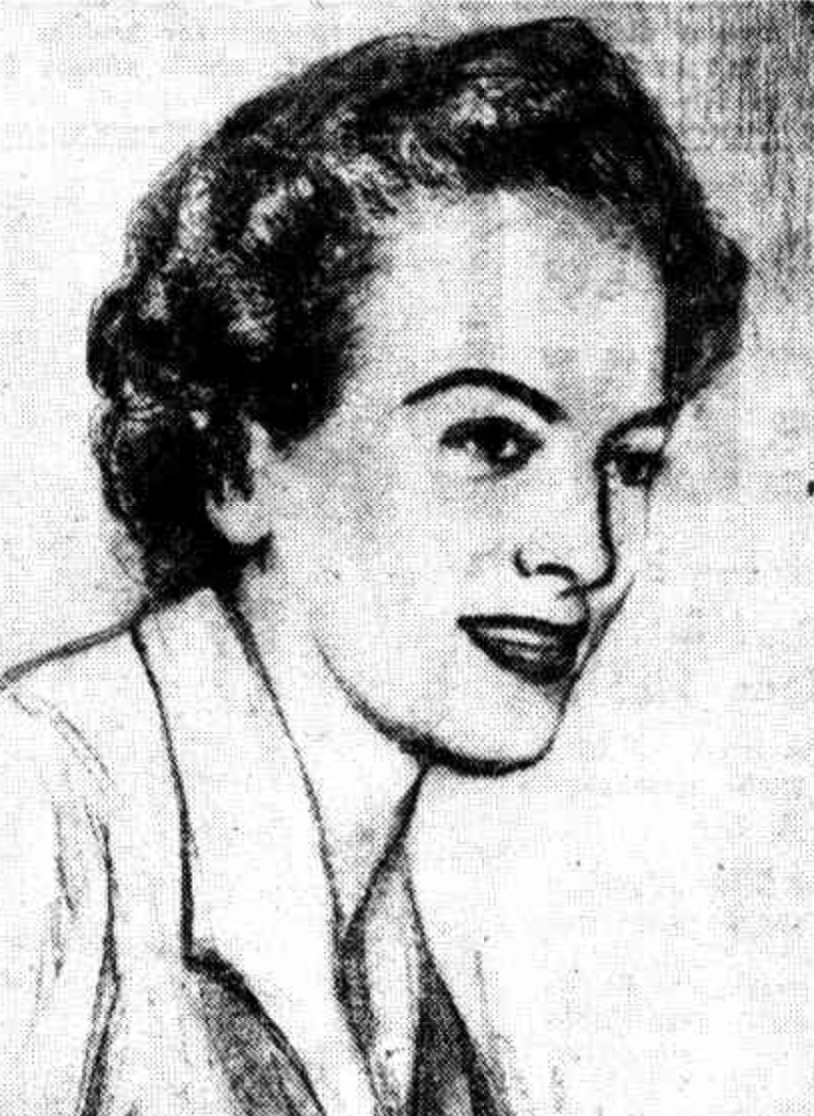
- Helen Blaxland, c.1953
- Born: Helen Frances Anderson; 21 June 1907; Neutral Bay, New South Wales
- Died: 17 December 1989 (aged 82); Camden, New South Wales, Australia
- Education: Bedales School; Frensham School
- Occupations: Red Cross worker, heritage conservationist, flower arranger, writer
- Spouse: Gregory Hamilton Blaxland (m. 1927; died 1969)
- Children: 1

Dame Helen Frances Blaxland, DBE (née Anderson; 21 June 1907 – 17 December 1989) was an Australian charity fundraiser, heritage conservationist, skilful flower arranger and nonfiction writer.

Blaxland spent much of her life working for charitable institutions, particularly the Australian Red Cross Society, which she joined in 1939. Her efforts were recognised by the award of Officer of the British Empire (OBE) in the 1967 New Year's Honours.

She was also known for her creative flower arranging and published two books on the subject, Flower Pieces (1946) and Collected Flower Pieces (1949).

Blaxland joined the New South Wales branch of the National Trust of Australia in 1959, was elected to its council in 1962, vice-president from 1965 to 1971 and a member of the Parramatta Properties Committee from 1967 until her resignation in 1983. She was appointed Dame Commander of the Order of the British Empire on 14 June 1975 for service to the community in recognition of her contribution to the Trust.

== Family ==
Helen Blaxland was the daughter of Brigadier General Sir Robert M. McCheyne Anderson and Jean Cairns (née Amos) Anderson. She was educated at Bedales School in England and later at Frensham School in Mittagong, New South Wales.

She married Gregory Blaxland on 8 November 1927. They had one child, a daughter, Antonia, who became a photographer. Antonia Blaxland predeceased her mother by four months. Dame Helen Blaxland died on 17 December 1989, aged 82, at Camden and was cremated.
