= Toorale State Conservation Area =

Conservation area in New South Wales, Australia

- Location within New South Wales
- Location: New South Wales
- Nearest city: Bourke
- Coordinates: 30°15′34.3″S 145°18′46.3″E
- Area: 543.85 km^{2} (209.98 sq mi)
- Established: November 2010
- Governing body: NSW National Parks & Wildlife Service; Kurnu-Baakandji people
- Website: Official website

The Toorale State Conservation Area is a 54,385-hectare (134,390-acre) protected conservation area located in the Far West region of New South Wales, approximately 80 kilometres (50 mi) southwest of Bourke. The park consists of land that was previously part of Toorale Station, and is jointly managed by the NSW National Parks & Wildlife Service and the local indigenous Kurnu-Baakandji people. Mount Talowla lookout is a place with views over the floodplain.
