= Kathleen Robinson =

Australian actress and director (1901–1983)

Kathleen Mary Robinson
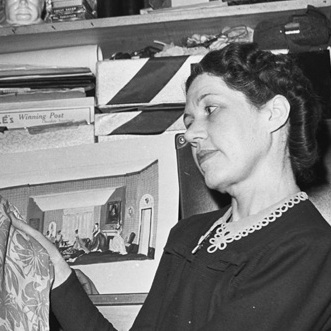
- Robinson in 1944
- Born: 31 January 1901; St Kilda
- Died: 28 December 1983 (aged 82); Bowral
- Known for: support for Australian theatre

Kathleen Mary Robinson (31 January 1901 – 28 December 1983) was an heiress and an Australian actor and director.

== Life ==
Robinson was born in 1901 in the Melbourne suburb of St Kilda. Her parents were Mary Louise (born McKay) and the Irish-born pastoralist Matthew John McWilliam Robinson. She had a lonely childhood on the Toorale sheep station. It is on the western bank of the Darling River between Bourke and Louth where the Warrego merges with the Darling river and is now a victim of drought.

She boarded and studied at Frensham School and her ambition was to be an actor. Her father objected and during his lifetime, she only acted in amateur productions.

In the mid-1930s, Robinson went to London, to study theatre production at the Westminster Theatre and she helped the producer Osmund Daltry. She also directed and the actors included Michael Wilding and the later playwright Emlyn Williams.

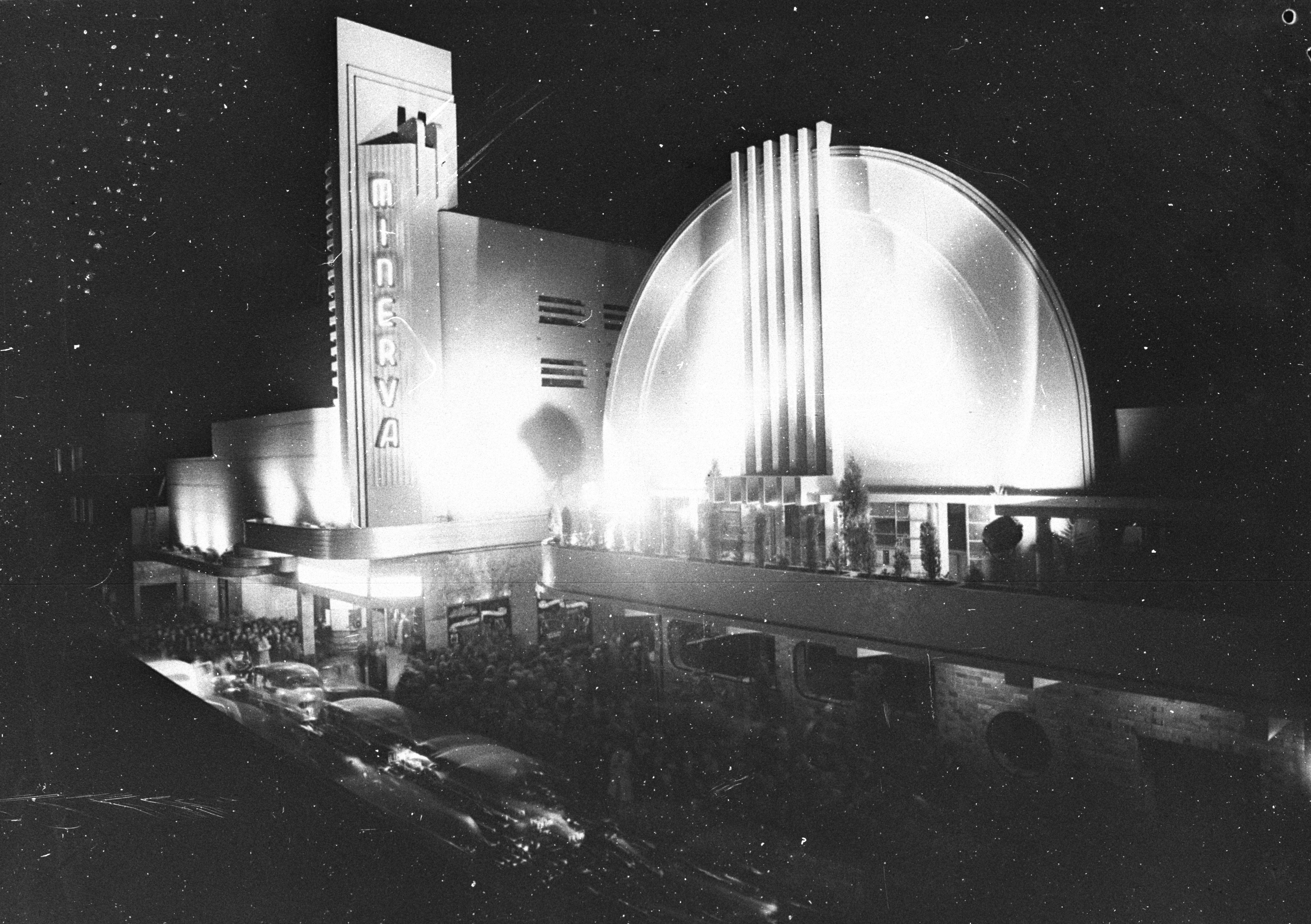
Minerva Theatre in Sydney in 1939

Alec Coppel returned to Australia during WW2 in 1940 for his "health". He produced the play Ladies in Retirement in Australia which is how they met. He and Robinson founded Whitehall Productions, operating out of the stylish Minerva Theatre in Kings Cross.

The first play they presented there was the world premiere of Coppel's Mr Smart Guy (1941). The huge theatre was seldom full, but they staged two plays every night. She and Coppel fell out in 1944 and he returned to the UK. Robinson took on new directors and founded new ideas. She had an accident at the same time as MGM wanted to convert the Minerva theatre into a cinema. She resisted but her company were moved out of the theatre while she was still in hospital.

Robinson returned to Bowral where she spent her retirement translating works into Braile. She died there in 1983.
