= Toorale Station =

Defunct pastoral lease in New South Wales

Coordinates: 30.275°S 145.4°E

Location in New South Wales

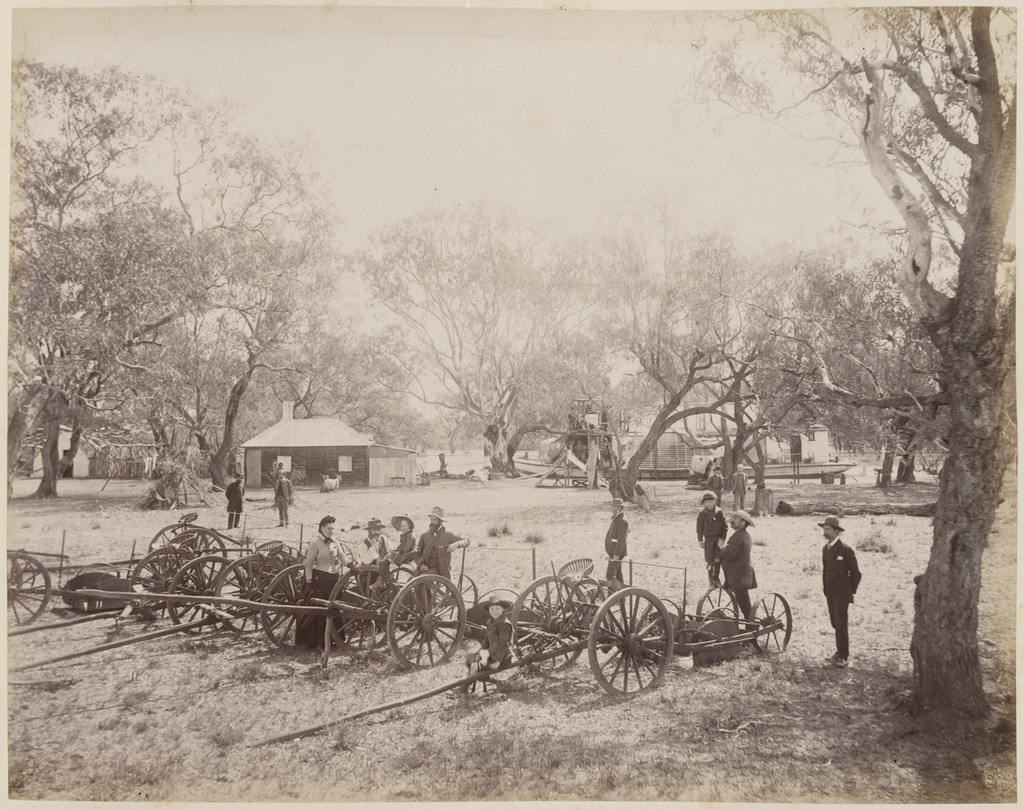
Toorale Station during the floods of 1886

Toorale Station is a defunct pastoral lease that once operated as a sheep station and cattle station in New South Wales. The station was purchased by the Federal and New South Wales Governments, and Toorale National Park was declared on a portion in 2010. The remaining area is now part of a 54,385 hectares (134,388 acres) state conservation area.

The property is situated approximately 53 kilometres (33 mi) south west of Bourke and 130 kilometres (81 mi) north of Cobar. The confluence of the Warrego River and the Darling River is located on the property.

== History ==
It was first established in 1857. The old shearing shed was built in 1873.

By 1880, it was owned by Sir Samuel Wilson. When Sir Samuel went to England, Samuel McCaughey bought Toorale along with another property, Dunlop Station. In 1894 about 265,000 sheep were shorn there. McCaughy owned the property until 1913.

In 1892 the poet, Henry Lawson worked as a roustabout in the Toorale woolshed. Lawson composed many works including A Stranger on the Darling, Bourke and Bosses Boots while at working at Toorale.

The theatre impresario and actress Kathleen Mary Robinson was born in 1901 and she was brought up on this lonely station. Her parents were Mary Louise (born McKay) and the Irish-born pastoralist Matthew John McWilliam Robinson. After a successful career she retired here and died in 1983.

The Australian Sheep Farms Limited–with directors including Sir Arthur Stanley, R. H. Caird and G. Slade–raised £400,000 in capital to acquire Toorale, Dunlop and Nocoleche Stations in 1925.

Shearing in 1931 took nine weeks and had 24 shearers pass 81,000 sheep over the boards for 2,095 wool bales. In 1936 Toorale was placed on the market, at this time it occupied an area of 850,452 acres (344,166 ha) and was stocked with 54,355 sheep and 1,089 mixed cattle.

The last big wool clip from the station was in 1953 with 2,100 wool bales being produced. Toorale was owned by the Berawinnia Pastoral Company and had run flocks of between 50,000 and 100,000 sheep for the last several years. Much of the property was then resumed for soldier settlement.

The property occupied an area of 91,000 hectares (224,866 acres) in 2008. In the same year it was acquired by the Federal and New South Wales Governments for A$24 million. It had been planned to turn the area into a National Park with the century-old dams to be demolished with the water flowing into the river system. The 30,866 hectares (76,272 acres) Toorale National Park was declared in 2010, the remaining area now being part of a state conservation area.

== See also ==
- List of ranches and stations
