= Gundabooka National Park =

National park in New South Wales, Australia

- IUCN category II (national park)
- Location within New South Wales
- Location: New South Wales
- Nearest city: Bourke
- Coordinates: 30°30′10″S 145°42′50″E
- Area: 639.02 km^{2} (246.73 sq mi)
- Established: April 1996
- Governing body: NSW National Parks & Wildlife Service
- Website: Official website

The Gundabooka National Park is a protected national park in the north-west region of New South Wales, in eastern Australia. The 63,902-hectare (157,910-acre) national park is located approximately 820 kilometres (510 mi) northwest of Sydney. The nearest town is Bourke, 70 kilometres (43 mi) to the north.

The national park is located adjacent to both the Darling River and the Toorale National Park, both located on the northwest boundary of Gundabooka National Park. Mount Gunderbooka and the Gunderbooka Range is located within the park. Prior to becoming a park the area was home to the Ngemba people and a sheep station. Petroglyph rock art and ancestral ceremonial grounds are located inside the park. It has many exotic plants.

The landscape is dominated by large open plains, stretches of grassy woodlands, and rust-coloured rocky cliffs.

Images from the park

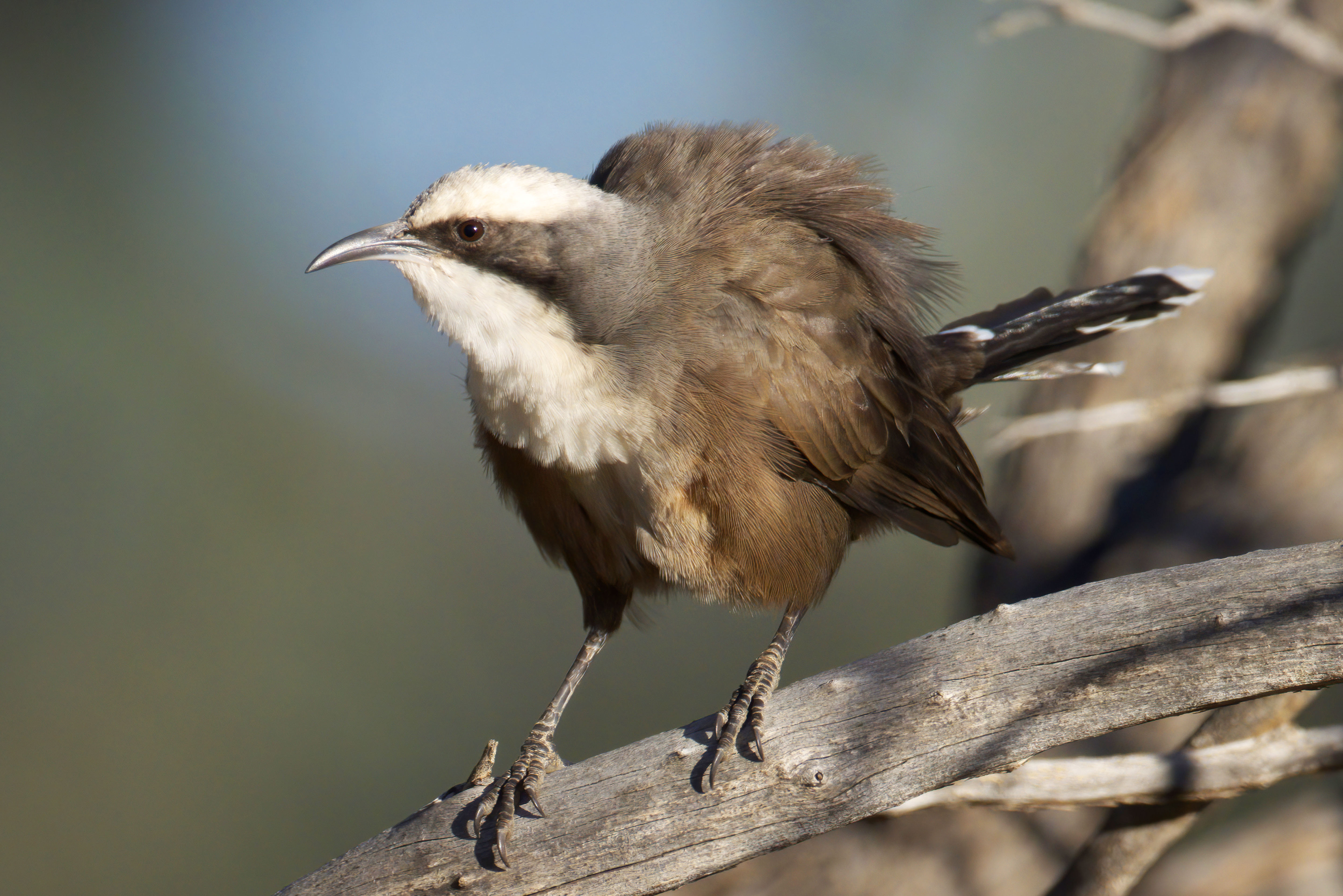
Grey-crowned babbler in the park

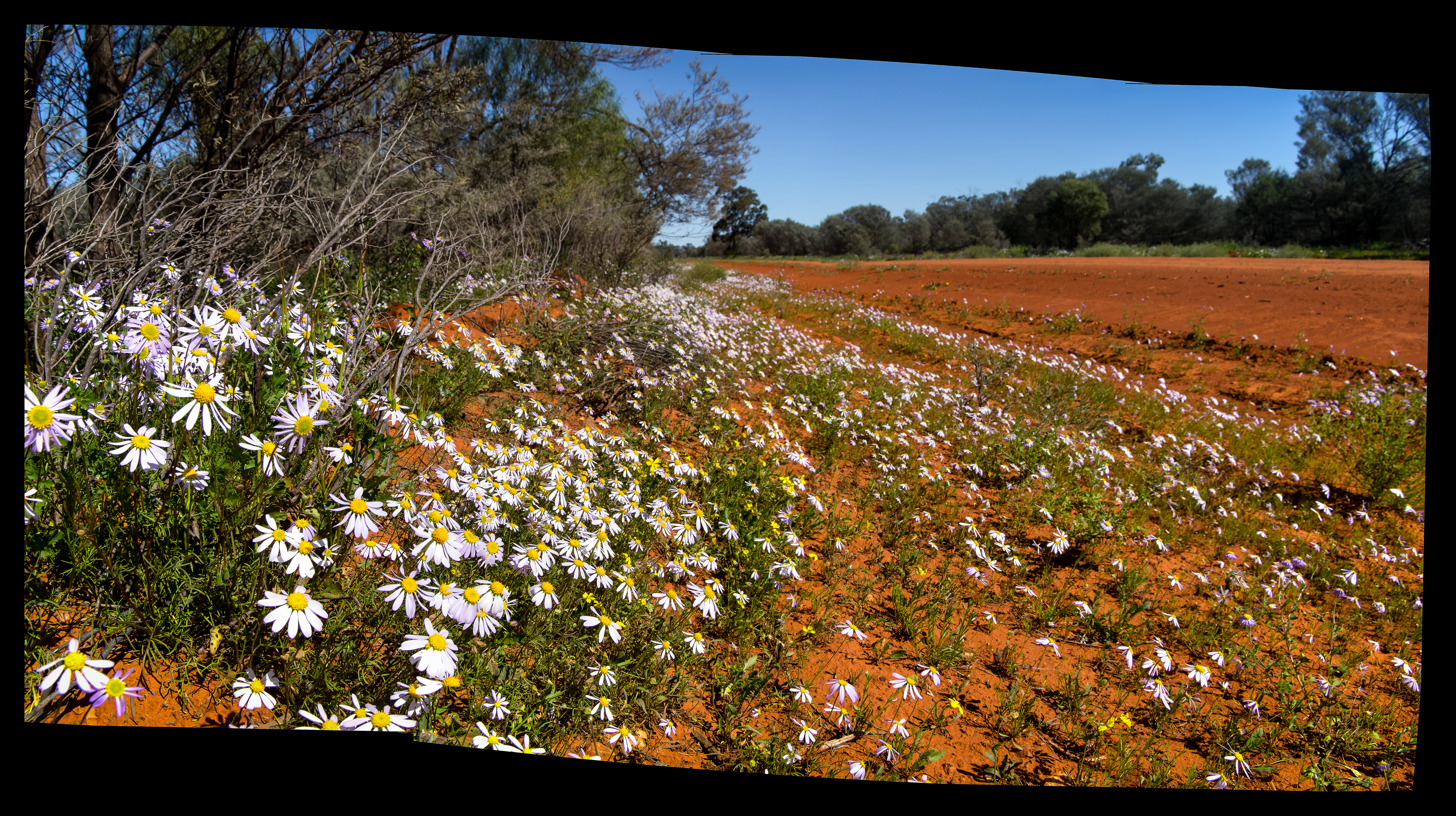

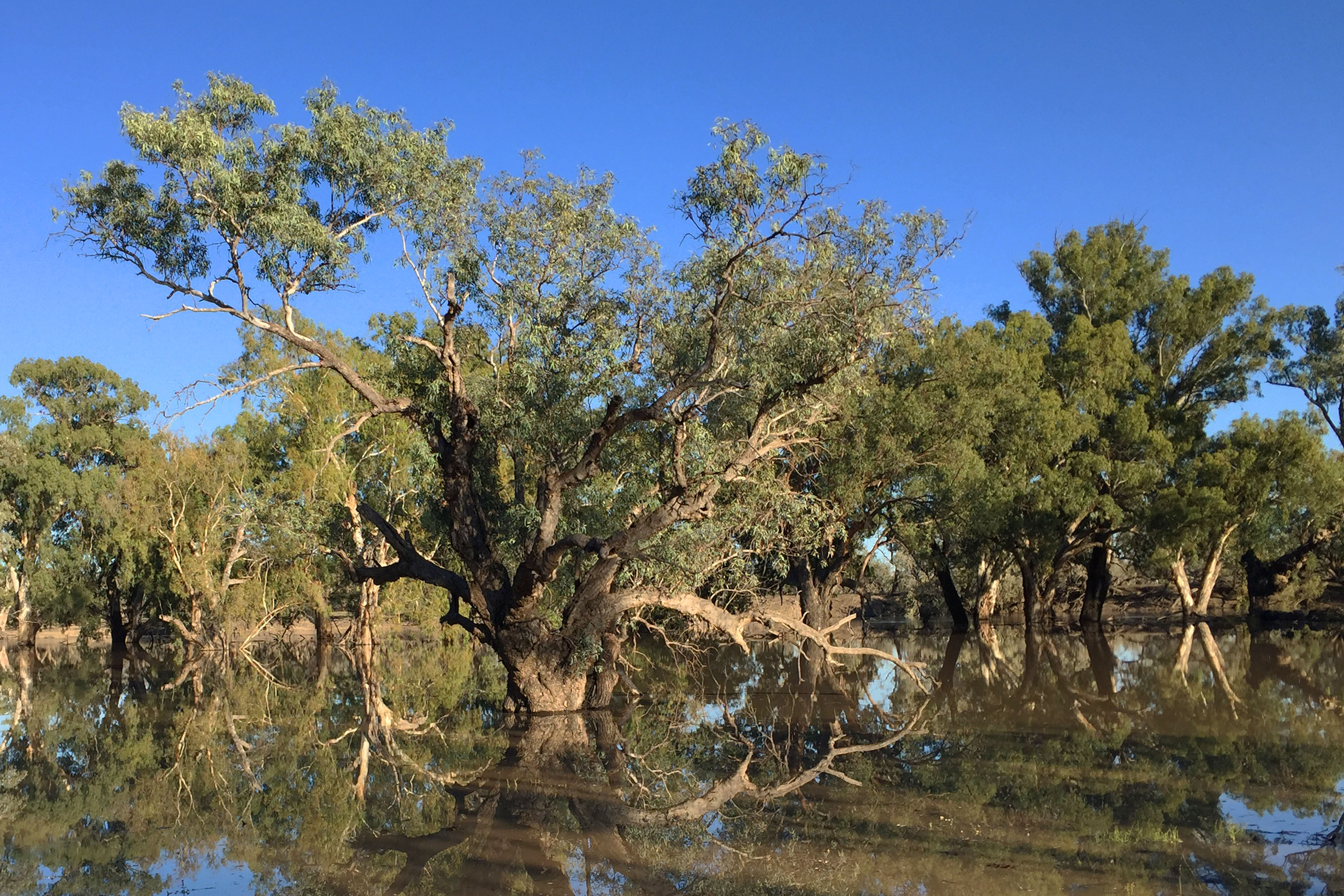
Floodwaters near Yanda campground

== See also ==
- Protected areas of New South Wales
