= Frensham School =

Frensham Schools
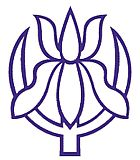

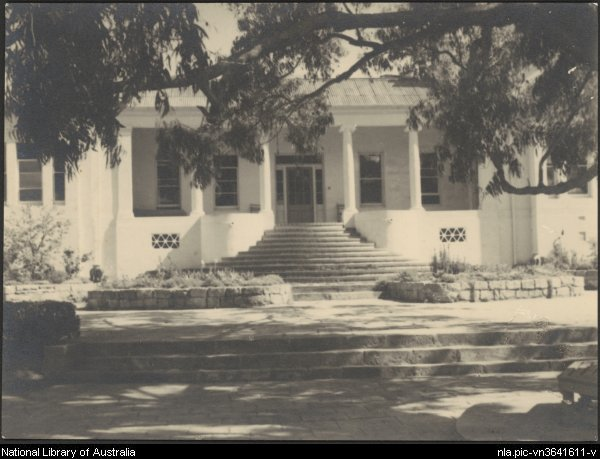
- Frensham Main House, 1934. (Harold Cazneaux)

Location
- Mittagong, Southern Highlands, New South Wales; Australia; 34°27′19″S 150°27′10″E

Information
- Type: Independent comprehensive single-sex early learning, primary, and secondary day and boarding school
- Motto: In Love Serve One Another (St. Paul to the Galatians 5:13)
- Denomination: Non-denominational
- Established: 1913
- Founder: Winifred West
- Educational authority: New South Wales Department of Education
- Chairman: Clementine Allan
- Head of school: Geoff Marsh
- Staff: ~174
- Grades: Preschool to Year 12 (Years 7 - 12 Boarding)
- Gender: Girls
- Enrolment: ~350 (Frensham) ~110 (Frensham Junior school)
- Colours: Purple, Green and White
- Website: www.frensham.nsw.edu.au

Frensham School is an independent, non-denominational comprehensive school comprising a co-educational preschool and primary Junior School, and a single-sex secondary day and boarding school for girls. It is located at Mittagong, in the Southern Highlands region of New South Wales, Australia.

Established in 1913 by Winifred West, the school has a non-selective enrolment policy and currently caters for approximately 350 students from Years 7 to 12, including 270 boarders. Students come to Frensham from Sydney, the Southern Highlands, regional New South Wales, interstate, and overseas. The school is governed by the Winifred West Schools Limited, along with Miss West's other two schools, Frensham Junior School (Gib Gate Campus)Primary school and Sturt Gallery and Studios Limited.

Frensham is affiliated with the Boarding Schools' Association of the United Kingdom, the Association of Heads of Independent Schools of Australia (AHISA), the Australian Boarding Schools' Association (ABSA), the Alliance of Girls' Schools Australasia (AGSA), and is a founding member of the Association of Heads of Independent Girls' Schools (AHIGS).

== History ==
Frensham was founded by Winifred Mary West on 17 July 1913, with three students and five teaching staff.

West first came to Australia in 1907, where she met Phyllis Clubbe, and the two soon after considered the founding of a school. To prepare for this they returned to England, where West furthered her experience in teaching, and Clubbe undertook teacher training. In 1912, they returned to Australia to begin the search for a suitable site, preferably a country region with an invigorating climate, within a reasonable distance of Sydney. On 1 June 1913, "Y Berth", a house belonging to Mr Tooth, was leased for five years with the option to purchase. The property featured a twelve-room house and 5 acres (2 ha) of grounds. The school was named after West's birthplace, Frensham in Surrey.

Based on word-of-mouth, the school population had grown to 100 by 1918, and continued to grow to 250 by 1943, and 330 in 1963. In 1934, photographer Harold Cazneaux published a book of photographs of the students and the school titled The Frensham Book. This collection is now in the National Library of Australia, and formed part of a National Library public exhibition of his photography. S. E. Emilsen wrote another book on the school in 1988.

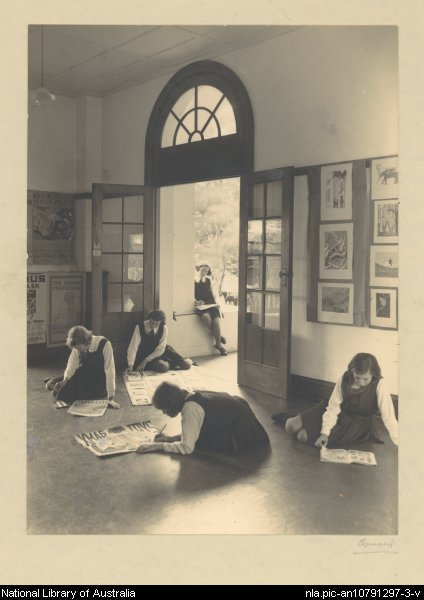
Frensham students in the art studio, 1934. (Harold Cazneaux)

In 1941, Miss West established the Sturt Craft Centre for local students, teaching weaving, spinning and carpentry as a community service. Eventually other crafts such as pottery, jewellery, textiles and screenprinting were introduced. Today, Sturt also hosts annual Summer and Winter schools focussing on the arts in January and July. The Sturt School for Wood was established in 1985, and runs full-time courses for designer makers of fine furniture. Gib Gate was established as a preparatory school for Frensham in 1954. The school had planned to open a preparatory school named "Little Frensham" in 1939, but the grounds were destroyed by the 1939 bushfires. In 1970, Gib Gate became co-educational, catering for day students from pre-school to Year 6, with boarding available in Years 4, 5 and 6.

== Heads ==
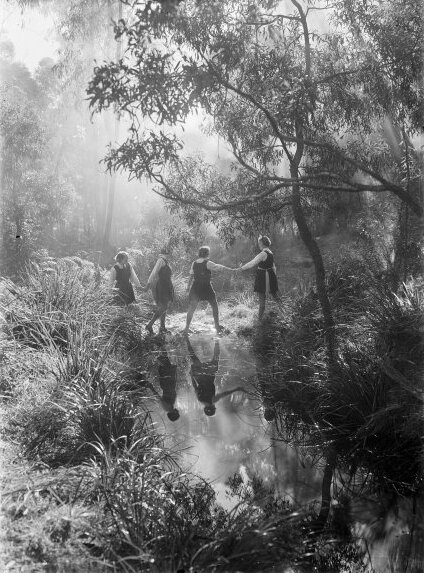
Students in the school grounds, 1934 (Harold Cazneaux)

Ordinal	Officeholder	Term start	Term end	Time in office	Notes
1	Winifred West	1913	1938	24–25 years	
2	Phyllis Bryant	1938	1965	26–27 years	
3	Catherine Sandberg	1965	1967	1–2 years	
4	Cynthia Parker	1968	1993	24–25 years	
5	Ann Schavemaker	1994	2000	5–6 years	
6	Julie Gillick*	2000	2020	19–20 years	
7	Sarah McGarry	January 2021	March 2023	1–2 years	
8	Julie Gillick	April 2023	May 2023	0 years	
9	Geoff Marsh	May 2023	incumbent	2–3 years	

== Governance ==
In 1917, Winifred West established a school Council consisting of staff, the head girl and prefects, old girls and community representatives. In 1932, Frensham School Limited was formed in order to provide for the school after the death of West, with the Council becoming the executive body. A Board of Governors became the executive body in 1952, with the council becoming an advisory body. Frensham School Limited was renamed as Winifred West Schools Limited in 1954, as recognition of Winifred West's other two schools, Sturt School and Gib Gate.

== Notable alumnae ==
Frensham School's Old Girls (alumnae) may elect to join the Frensham Fellowship. The Frensham Fellowship was established in 1918, as a way of linking past and present students. Membership is open to former students and staff, with honorary membership offered to current staff and school prefects. Some notable Old Girls include:

Media, entertainment and the arts

- Marion Hall Best – interior designer
- Helen Blaxland DBE – charity fundraiser, heritage conservationist, skilful flower arranger and nonfiction writer
- Beatrice Bligh – gardener
- Eleanor Cullis-Hill – architect
- Rosemary Dobson AO – author and poet with 13 published works; Winner of awards including a 1996 Australia Council Writer's Emeritus Award
- Henrietta Drake-Brockman – playwright; 1938 winner of a Sesquicentenary Celebration Prize for best full-length play for Men Without Wives; Winner of a Bulletin short story prize
- Elizabeth Fell – activist, journalist, academic, feminist and public intellectual
- Nancy Keesing AM – author of 26 volumes of poetry and fiction, chaired the Australia Council and the State Library of NSW
- Annette Macarthur-Onslow – author and illustrator; Winner of the Book of the Year Award of the Children's Book Council for Uhu (1970)
- Kate McClymont – investigative journalist at The Sydney Morning Herald
- Penny Meagher – painter
- Joan Phipson AM – author of 25 novels, including The Family Conspiracy; Winner of the Australian Children's Book of the Year (1963), and the New York Herald Tribune Children's Spring Book Festival Award (1964)
- Kathleen Mary Robinson (1901–1983), who was a leading figure in theatres, studied and acted here.
- Babette Smith OAM – colonial historian and mediator
- Betty Who – stage name of Jessica Anne Newham, pop artist

Medicine and science

- Dr Catherine Hamlin AC – obstetrician and gynaecologist; co-founder of the Addis Ababa Fistula Hospital in Ethiopia; pioneer in fistula surgery; 1999 nominee for the Nobel Peace Prize

Politics, public service and the law

- Ruth Dobson OBE – former Ambassador to Denmark and the Republic of Ireland.
- Rosemary Foot AO – former Deputy Leader of the NSW Liberal Party. First woman to be elected to a leadership position of a major party in a lower house anywhere in Australia
- Jane Mathews AO – judge of the Supreme Court of New South Wales.
- Florinda Katharine Ogilvie MBE (1902–1983) – central to the development of Social Work in Australia
- Lucy Hughes Turnbull – a former Lord Mayor of Sydney (2003–2004); wife of Australian Prime Minister Malcolm Turnbull; Company Director and author (she also attended Kincoppal-Rose Bay, School of the Sacred Heart, Sydney)

Sport and aviation

- Christine Davy MBE – former alpine skier who competed at the 1956 and 1960 Winter Olympics and pioneering female airline pilot who was the first Australian woman to hold a 1st Class Air Transport Pilot's Licence

Education

- Patience Hawker – co-founder of Stawell School for girls in South Australia

== See also ==
- List of non-government schools in New South Wales
- List of boarding schools in Australia
