= Winifred West =

English-born Australian educationist (1881–1971)

Winifred West CBE
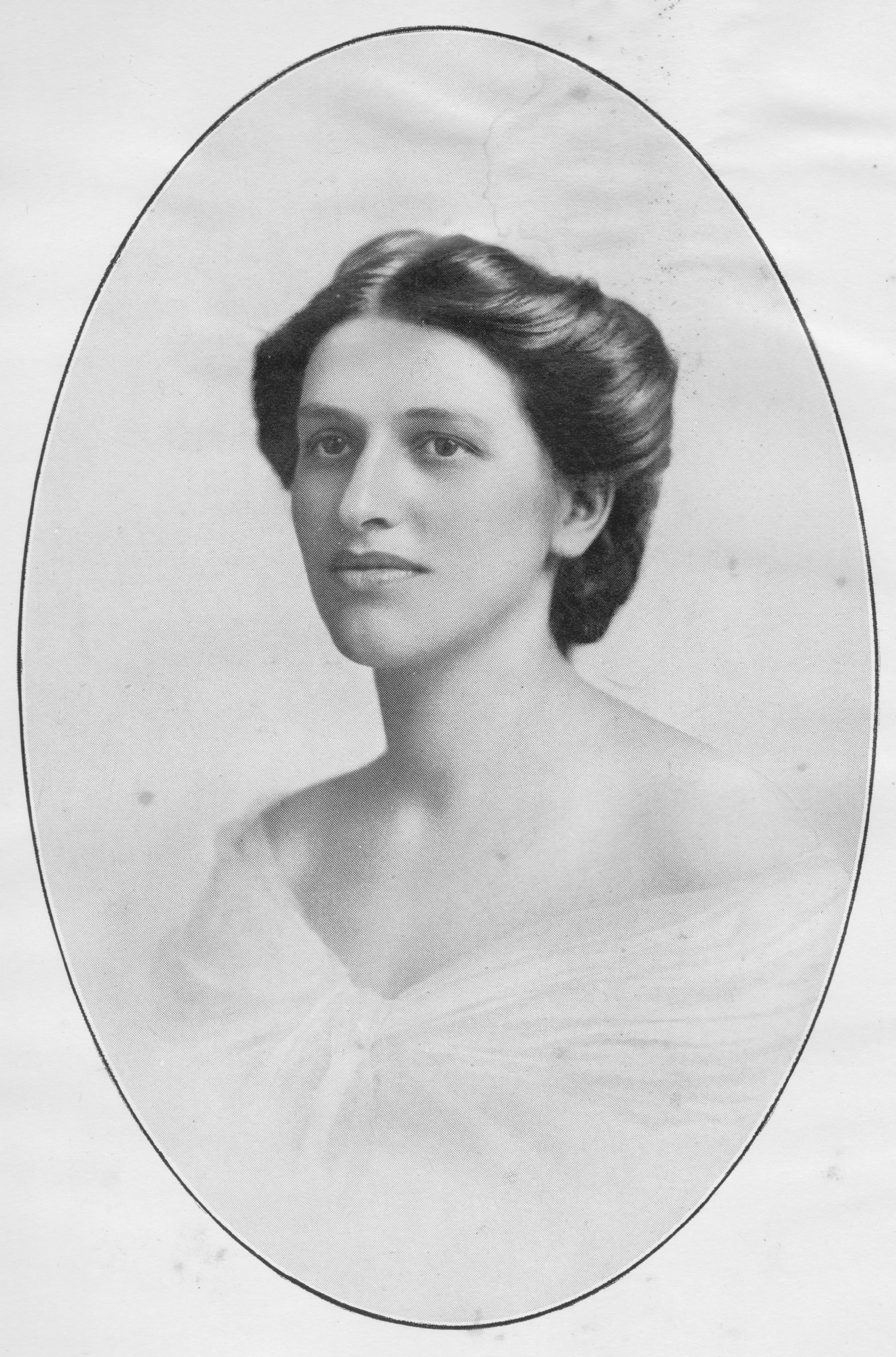
- West in 1913
- Born: Winifred Mary West; 21 December 1881; Frensham, Surrey, England
- Died: 26 September 1971 (aged 89); Bowral, New South Wales, Australia

Winifred Mary West CBE (21 December 1881 – 26 September 1971) was an English-born Australian educationist.

== Early life and education ==
Born at Frensham in Surrey to schoolmaster Charles William West and Fanny, née Sturt, West spent her early life there and in Farnham, where the family moved in 1891. She attended Queen Anne's School in Caversham, Berkshire, from 1894 to 1900 having received a scholarship, before studying medieval and modern languages at Newnham College, Cambridge, from 1900 to 1903. She played hockey for Cambridge and won a hockey blue.

== Career ==
West was employed from 1903 as a teacher at Guernsey Ladies' College.

In 1906, West became engaged to an Australian and travelled to New South Wales in 1907, but on the voyage she fell in love with an explorer in the British Antarctic Expedition, breaking off the engagement.

In Sydney she taught private students (Helen Simpson was among her pupils) and studied painting with Julian Ashton. She also worked at the Australian Museum where she drew shells for Charles Hedley. Playing hockey at Rushcutters Bay she met Phyllis Clubbe, with whom she founded the New South Wales Women's Hockey Association; both represented the state in the sport.

West spent two years from 1910 in England teaching at Harrogate Ladies' College, returning with a belief in a rural educational setting. She and Clubbe opened a school at Mittagong, Frensham School, in July 1913; the school became known for its non-denominational religion and easy attitude. West retired as head of the school in 1938 and taught spinning, weaving and carpentry to the students from 1941 at Sturt School Crafts Centre. She established a pottery in 1954.

A vice-president of the New Education Fellowship (1930s), West visited the Soviet Union in 1935. She established friendships with educationists, artists and musicians including John Moore, Sybil Thorndike, Ernest Llewellyn and Keith Hancock.

West died in 1971 at Bowral and was cremated.

== Honours and recognition ==
In 1953, West was appointed Member of the Order of the British Empire in recognition of her work in child welfare and with ex-servicemen, and received her honour from Queen Elizabeth II during the 1954 royal visit. She was promoted to Commander in the 1971 New Year Honours, "For services to education over the past fifty years".

In 1954, Jack Renshaw, as Minister for Public Works and Local Government, opened Winifred West Park in Mittagong and paid tribute to West's contribution not just to education but to the town and district communities.

== Publications ==
- West, Winifred; Dobson, Rosemary (1962), Sturt workshops, 1962, Ure Smith
- West, Winifred Mary (1973), Addresses and talks (Memorial ed.), Angus & Robertson, ISBN 978-0-207-12642-0
