= Social work in the military =

Specialty of social work with soldiers

The Red Cross and similar corps of social work organizations shaped the idea of military social work. The role of military social workers was important during the World Wars. Over one million soldiers were admitted to American Army hospitals for neuro-psychiatric problems in each war. Commissioned status for social workers was achieved in 1945, although full status wasn't given until the 1950s.

== Duties ==
- Counsel military personnel and their family members
- Supervise counselors and caseworkers
- Survey military personnel to identify problems and plan solutions
- Plan social action programs to rehabilitate personnel with problems
- Plan and monitor equal opportunity programs
- Conduct research on social problems and programs
- Organize community activities on military bases
- Active Duty, Reserve, and National Guard Social Workers can and do deploy to war zones to assist service members with combat or operational stress disorders.

== Civilian counterparts ==
Civilian social workers work for hospitals, human service agencies and federal, state, county and city governments. They perform duties similar to those performed by military social workers. However, civilian social workers usually specialize in a particular field, such as family services, child welfare, or medical services. They may also be called social group workers, medical social workers, psychiatric social worker, and social welfare administrators.

Civilian social workers in the military provide family advocacy services, such as conducting assessments on cases involving domestic violence or child abuse within a military family.

Military families have historically demonstrated significant resilience in the face of numerous challenges, though, in the United States, this resilience of military families has, in many psychosocial domains, entirely eroded as a result of circumstances associated with the longest armed conflict in national history (Cox & Waller, 2016).

== Ethical dilemmas ==
Besides ethical dilemmas that are inherent to all social workers, the policies and practices in the military cause even more issues.

- The dual profession of the military social worker
- The multi-purpose role of the social worker as a human service provider
- Hierarchical structure governed by military law (Uniform Code of Military Justice)
- Dual clients (active-duty and civilians)
- Geographic and professional isolation
