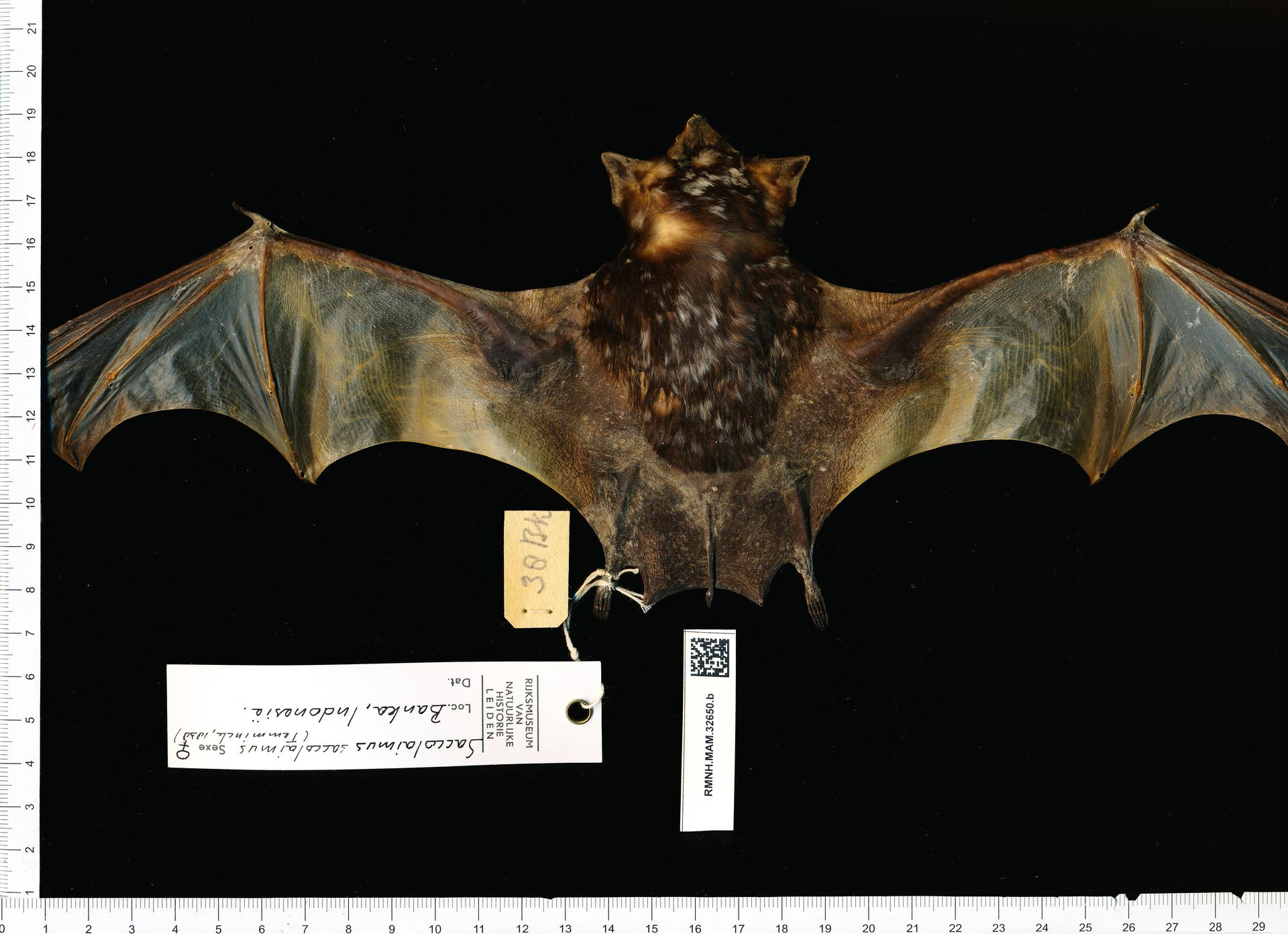

Conservation status
- Least Concern (IUCN 3.1)

Scientific classification
- Kingdom: Animalia
- Phylum: Chordata
- Class: Mammalia
- Order: Chiroptera
- Family: Emballonuridae
- Genus: Saccolaimus
- Species: S. saccolaimus

Binomial name
- Saccolaimus saccolaimus Temminck, 1838
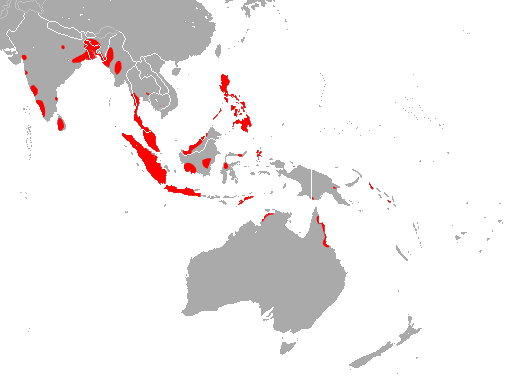
- Naked-rumped pouched bat range

= Naked-rumped pouched bat =

Species of bat

The naked-rumped pouched bat (Saccolaimus saccolaimus), also known as the pouched tomb bat, is a species of sac-winged bat in the family Emballonuridae.

== Taxonomy ==
Described in 1838 by Coenraad Temminck. the author assigned the species to a new genus. The type location is in Indonesia.

The uncertain diversity of related populations is represented by five subspecies,

- species Saccolaimus saccolaimus Temminck, 1838.
  - subspecies Saccolaimus saccolaimus saccolaimus
  - subspecies Saccolaimus saccolaimus affinis
  - subspecies Saccolaimus saccolaimus crassus
  - subspecies Saccolaimus saccolaimus nudicluniatus De Vis, 1905.
  - subspecies Saccolaimus saccolaimus pluto

The form nudicluniatus described by De Vis in 1905, a population found in Queensland, was formerly recognised as Saccolaimus nudicluniatus.
