= Savigny =

Savigny may refer to:

== Places ==
=== In France ===
- Savigny, Aulnay-sous-Bois, a district in Aulnay-sous-Bois in the Seine-Saint-Denis department in the north-eastern suburbs of Paris
- Savigny, Manche, in the Manche département
- Savigny, Haute-Marne, in the Haute-Marne département
- Savigny, Rhône, in the Rhône département
- Savigny, Haute-Savoie, in the Haute-Savoie département
- Savigny, Vosges, in the Vosges département
- Savigny-en-Revermont, in the Saône-et-Loire département
- Savigny-en-Sancerre, in the Cher département
- Savigny-en-Septaine, in the Cher département
- Savigny-en-Terre-Plaine, in the Yonne département
- Savigny-en-Véron, in the Indre-et-Loire département
- Savigny-lès-Beaune, in the Côte-d'Or département
- Savigny-le-Sec, in the Côte-d'Or département
- Savigny-le-Temple, in the Seine-et-Marne département
- Savigny-Lévescault, in the Vienne département
- Savigny-le-Vieux, in the Manche département
- Savigny-Poil-Fol, in the Nièvre département
- Savigny-sous-Faye, in the Vienne département
- Savigny-sous-Mâlain, in the Côte-d'Or département
- Savigny-sur-Aisne, in the Ardennes département
- Savigny-sur-Ardres, in the Marne département
- Savigny-sur-Braye, in the Loir-et-Cher département
- Savigny-sur-Clairis, in the Yonne département
- Savigny-sur-Grosne, in the Saône-et-Loire département
- Savigny-sur-Orge, in the Essonne département
- Savigny-sur-Seille, in the Saône-et-Loire département

=== In Switzerland ===
- Savigny, Switzerland, a commune in the canton of Vaud

== People ==
- Friedrich Carl von Savigny (1779–1861), German jurist
- Marie Jules César Savigny (1777–1851), French zoologist
- Rev. W. H. Savigny (1825–1889), Australian headmaster, father of

- William Savigny (1864–1922), Australian cricketer and teacher
- John Savigny (1867–1923), Australian cricketer

- Annie Gregg Savigny (c. 1838–1901), Canadian novelist

== Other ==
- Savigny-lès-Beaune wine, a wine region in France
- Savigny Abbey, a ruined monastery in Savigny-le-Vieux, France
- Congregation of Savigny, a Cistercian reform movement originating in this abbey

== See also ==
- Sévigny (disambiguation)
