= Carthona, Darling Point =

House in Sydney, New South Wales, Australia

Carthona
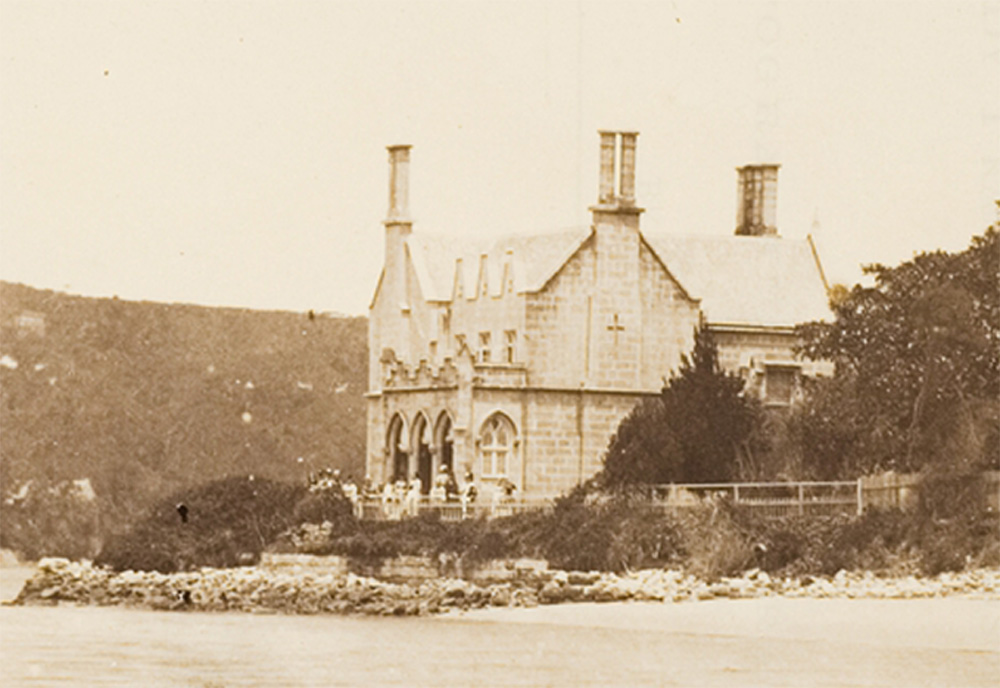
- Carthona, Darling Point, c. 1870 before the 1880s extensions at the back were made.

- Location within inner Sydney
- 33°52′07″S 151°14′30″E
- Location: 5 Carthona Avenue, Darling Point, New South Wales, Australia

History
- Built: 1841
- Built for: Sir Thomas Mitchell

Site notes
- Architect: George Allen Mansfield
- Architectural style: Gothic Revival architecture

Carthona is a large Gothic Revival architecture style house situated at 5 Carthona Avenue, on a promontory of Darling Point, in Sydney, New South Wales, Australia. The mansion is listed by the New South Wales Heritage Council as a building of historical significance and is listed as being of local significance on the New South Wales Heritage Database.

Carthona was initially the residence of surveyor and explorer Thomas Mitchell and his family.

== Architecture ==
Carthona is described by the Heritage Council as an "impressive two storey mansion with cellars, of mannerist Tudor Gothic style. Built of sandstone, exterior there is a profusion of gabled slate roofs having castellated parapets and balconies dominated by tall tudor chimneys. Ground floor windows are pointed Gothic style having three centred heads and fretwork while first floor windows are flat arched and shuttered." It was built in 1841 by Sir Thomas Mitchell and it is believed that many of the keystones of doors and windows were carved by him. Carthona has had many residents some of whom were historically interesting.

== Residents ==
=== The Mitchell family ===
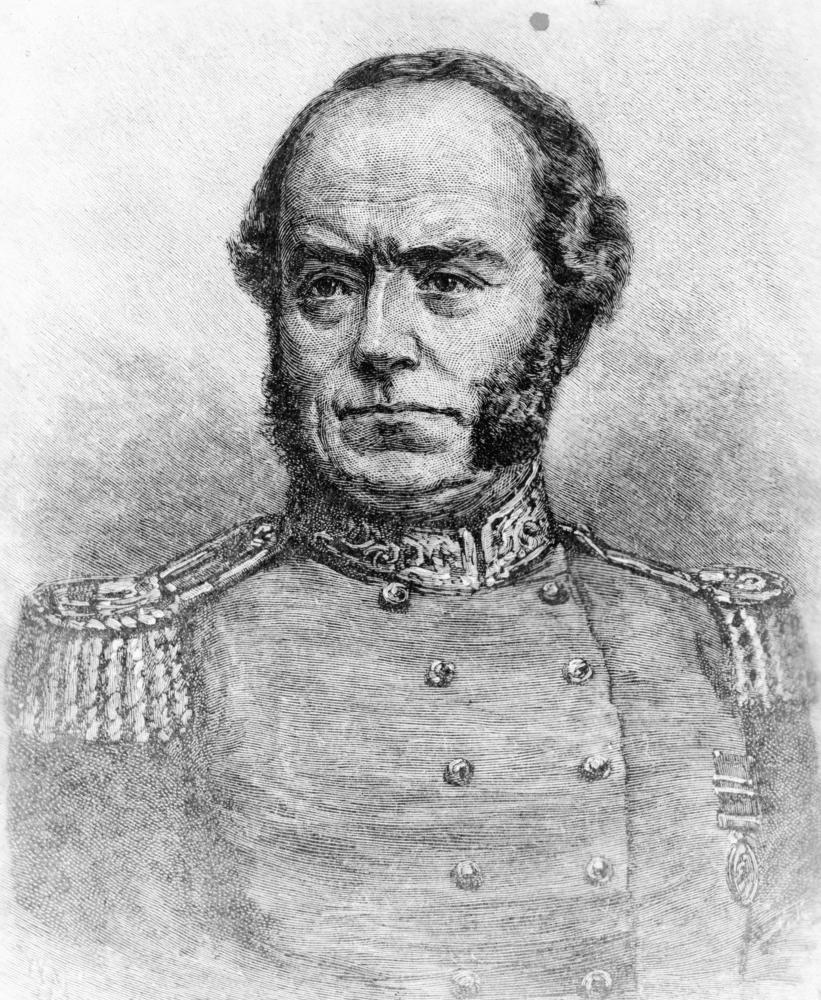
Sir Thomas Mitchell

Thomas Mitchell was born in 1792 in Scotland. His family was not wealthy but he joined the military and was proficient in drawing up plans of battlefields. In 1818 he married Mary Thomson Blunt who was the eighteen-year-old daughter of General Richard Blunt. In 1827 the couple came to Sydney and Thomas became Assistant Surveyor General of New South Wales and two years later became Surveyor General. During the 1830s Mitchell conducted three major expeditions into the interior of Australia. In 1837 he went to England and published a book about his explorations and obtained his knighthood. He returned to Sydney from England in 1841 and soon after purchased Lindesay. While he was at Lindesay Mitchell was planning to build Carthona. Besides buying Lindesay on Lot 1 in 1841, Mitchell also bought Lots 7, 12, 13, 14 and 15. It is on the last four lots that Carthona was constructed. In 1845 the Mitchell family moved into Carthona and Mitchell sold Lindesay to his friend Sir Charles Nicholson.

Soon after Mitchell moved into Carthona he set out on his fourth expedition in search of an overland route from Boree in NSW to the outpost named Victoria at Port Essington, in the present day Northern Territory. On the completion of the exploratory journey, Mithchell's Aboriginal "guide, companion, counsellor and friend", Yuranigh, lived briefly at Carthona, but not liking the city, Yuranigh soon left to take up work as a stockman.

In 1847 Mitchell again went to England and it seems that, at least initially, he may have intended not to return as an advertisement in the Sydney Morning Herald in February 1847 lists for sale all of his property including Carthona. Carthona is described as "the very splendid family mansion with spacious stabling and two acres of ground at Mrs Darling's Point, the present residence of Sir Thomas Mitchell, Surveyor-General."

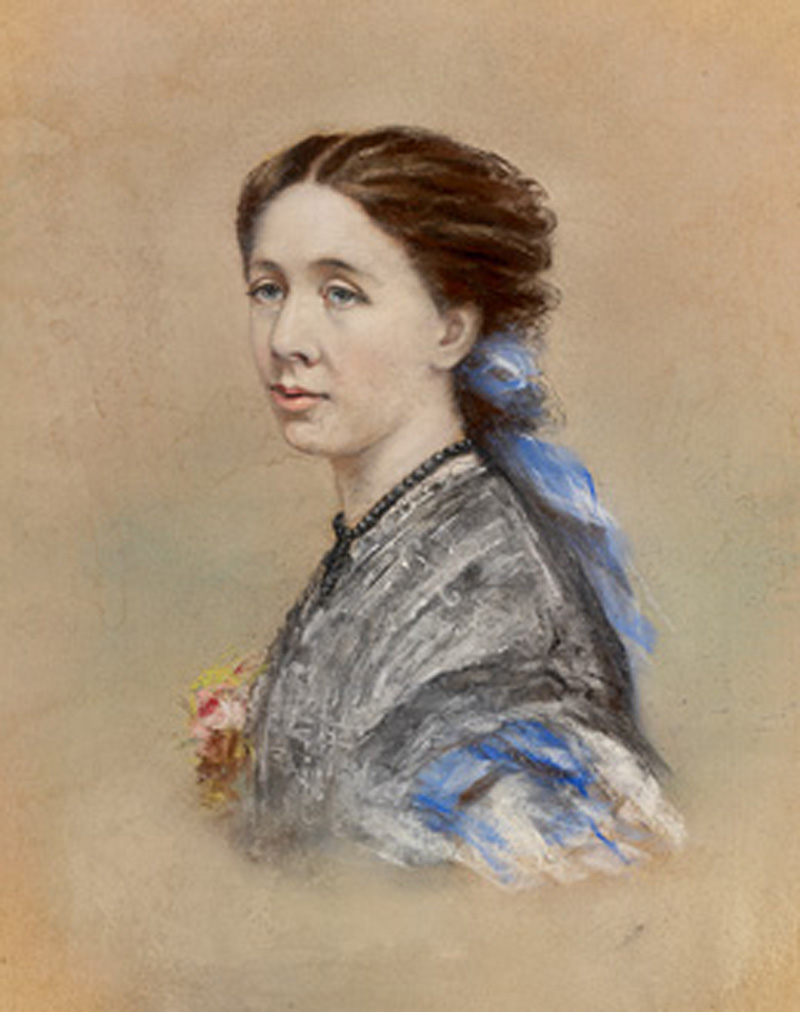
Blanche Mitchell, youngest daughter of Sir Thomas Mitchell

He returned from England in July 1848 but again went to London for almost two years in 1852. In 1855, after his return to Sydney while conducting surveying work in Southern New South Wales he contracted a chill and developed pneumonia. He died at Carthona in October 1855.

In his will Mitchell left all of his property to his children and Carthona was left to his second youngest daughter Alice who was then only 16 and living with her mother. It seems that from about 1858 Carthona was rented by the Mitchell family to the Misses Cooksey as Blanche Mitchell, the youngest daughter mentions in her Diary on 17 July 1858 that Miss Cooksey called at Craigend Terrace where they were then living and paid her mother a quarterly rent.

Because Mitchell had left a considerable amount of debt, Lady Mitchell and her children were forced to move out of Carthona to a much smaller residence in Craigend Terrace, Woolloomooloo. Blanche Mitchell disliked the new accommodation and reminisced about her previous life at Carthona in her diary. In one section she says.

"Oh! for one breath of cool Carthona air, which used so to refresh us after having taken a run round the green, or when at night after one of these hot windy days, tired and wearied out, we used all to sit at the dining room window, waiting for the Southerly wind to blow, then what a rush, what a scramble to get out, and what a glorious run we would have chasing each other round! Ah, then we were happy, at least I was, always looking forward into a bright future every day I thought would bring us more happiness"

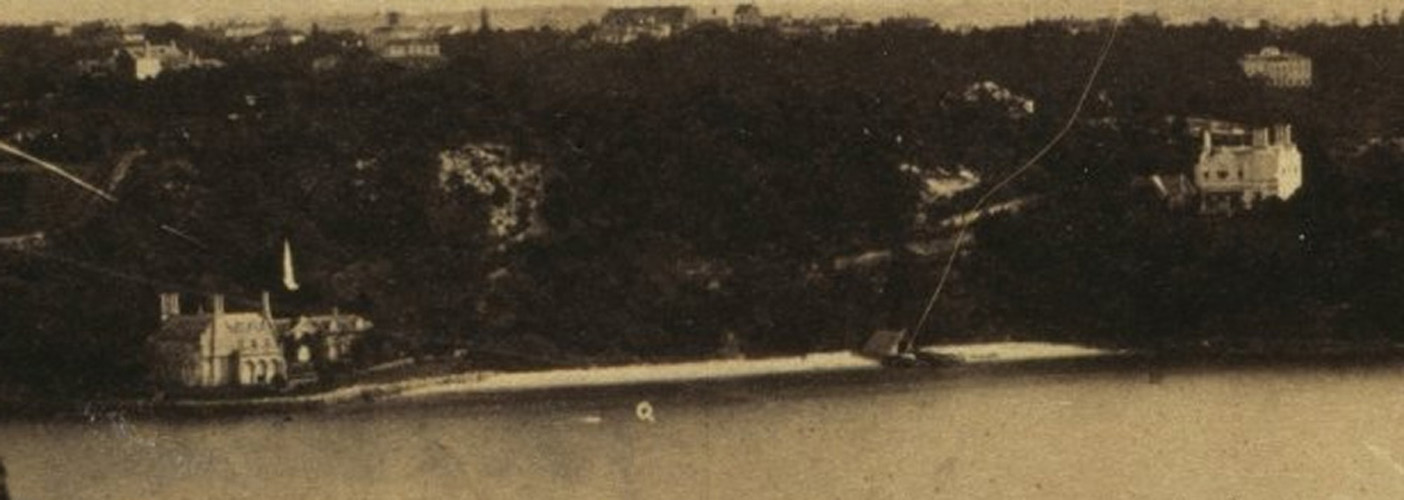
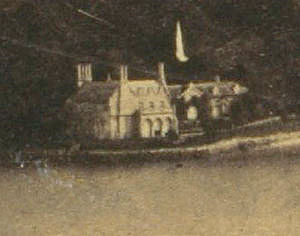
Left: Carthona and Lindesay on Darling Point circa 1855, about the time the Mitchell family were living there; right: a closer view of Carthona circa 1855

=== The Misses Cooksey ===
The Cooksey sisters were Catherine and Sarah Cooksey, who were born in Sedgley in Staffordshire. Catherine was born in about 1810 and Sarah in about 1815. There are records for at least two other sisters. Martha was born in 1805 and Mary Ann, the eldest sister, was born in 1800. Mary Ann married William Henry Savigny (1792–1828) in 1821. They had a son in May 1825 also named William Henry Savigny. The four sisters lived together for some time in Wharf House in Upton Warren. In this residence they conducted a ladies boarding school. Martha Cooksey died in 1851. Mary Ann and her son, best known as the Rev. W. H. Savigny, immigrated to Australia in 1853. and several years later the two remaining Cooksey sisters Catherine and Sarah also immigrated, and ran a boarding school for young ladies at Carthona from 1858 to 1872. Their first advertisement in the Sydney Morning Herald in January 1858 read

"The Misses Cooksey, having taken Carthona, the residence of the late Sir Thomas Mitchell, will be ready to receive their pupils on 26 January. For terms apply to the Misses Cooksey. Applications to be made at Carthona, Darling Point"

In 1872 their sister Mary Ann Savigny died and the Misses Cooksey left Carthona and stayed at her late residence in Launceston, Tasmania for a short time. They then rented a house at 4 Grey Street, East Melbourne, where they lived until 1885, when Catherine died. Sarah then left for Launceston, where she died a year later. Some time before 1887 the Savigny home at 45 Lyttleton Street, Launceston, was dubbed "Carthona", as was the home of John Savigny on Ashby Street.

After the Cooksey sisters left, Carthona was rented for some time by Mrs Tait who also ran a boarding school. Thomas Mitchell's daughter, Alice Mitchell, who inherited Carthona, had married Captain Philip Dauncey in 1859 and now lived in England. She first advertised Carthona for sale in 1875 and the notice read as follows.

"The family mansion was built of stone under the personal inspection of the late Sir Thomas Mitchell containing on the basement several large and cool cellars, well drained; on the ground floor a portico, a very large hall and a staircase to the second story; a well finished drawing room separated from the dining room by sliding doors with bay window looking over Double Bay.

Adjoining the dining room with the same charming view is the library and on the other side of the hall is a good bedroom and a butler's pantry. Attached to the house is the large kitchen containing Russell's cooking stove and other conveniences.

The bedroom story contains chambers suitable in character to the rest of the building. The outbuildings erected in stone comprise spacious coachhouse, stabling for six horses, plenty of good servants' bedroom accommodation, loft, saddle room, laundry etc. A never failing supply of pure water laid on to kitchen and laundry besides a massive stone tank roofed, is supplied by a spring from the rock."

=== The Allen family ===
Arthur Mansfield Allen was born in 1843 in Sydney. He was the son of George Allen (1800–1877) who was a prominent Sydney solicitor and owned Toxteth Park, Glebe. Arthur was born into a large family of ten children, five sons and five daughters. He received a good education and graduated from Sydney University with a Master of Arts Degree in 1866. He entered his father’s firm of solicitors Allen and Allen in the same year.

In 1869 he married Alice Greer who was 19 years old. When they moved into Carthona in 1880 they had three children under the age of ten. Unfortunately Arthur was plagued with ill health. He suffered from Bright’s Disease which is a kidney disorder. While the Allens were at Carthona they went to England twice to try to improve Arthur’s health. Their last visit was at the beginning of 1885. Not long after their return Alice died at Carthona at the age of 35. and three months later Arthur died at his brother’s residence of Toxteth Park. His brother was Sir George Wigram Allen.

Carthona was put on the market in 1886 and was bought by James Sutherland Mitchell who at that time owned Etham, an adjoining property. He bought Carthona for his son William Broadfoot Mitchell who was married the following year. This Mitchell family was not related to Sir Thomas Mitchell.

=== William Broadfoot Mitchell ===
William Broadfoot Mitchell was born in 1850. His father was James Sutherland Mitchell and his mother was Elizabeth Carter Laidley who died in 1868. After his wife’s death James married Maria Allen. who was the sister of Arthur Allen the then owner of Carthona. James was a partner in Tooths Brewery and William was employed by his father’s firm as a Manager.

In 1887 William married Edith M Gore. They had two children one girl and one boy. William was reported to be a good sportsman and enjoyed yachting but unfortunately he did not enjoy good health and he died prematurely at the age of 49. After his death in 1899, Carthona was advertised for sale. It was marketed jointly with Etham and Prudhoe which were properties also on Darling Point.

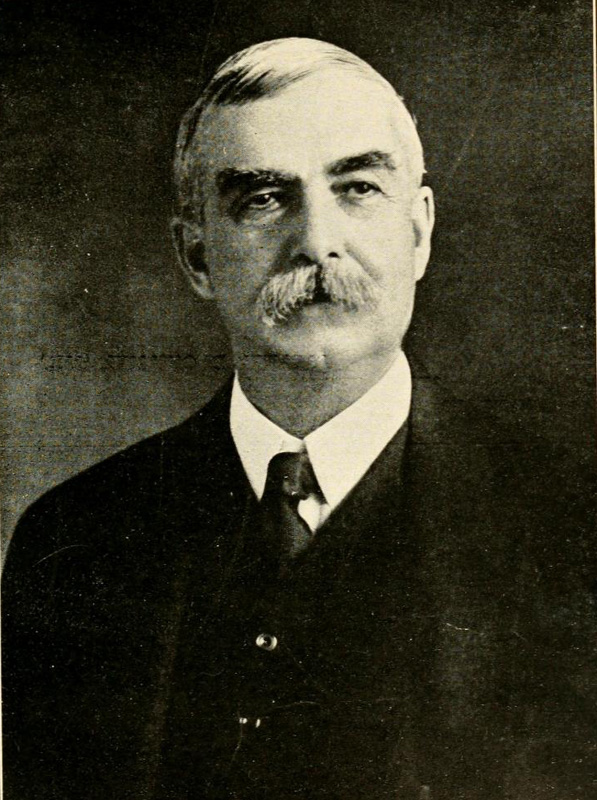
Holmes Samuel Chipman

=== Holmes Samuel Chipman ===
The next resident of Carthona was Holmes Samuel Chipman. He is listed in the Sands Directories as living at Carthona between 1900 and 1902.

Chipman was born in Nova Scotia, Canada in 1850. He had various occupations including school teaching, shipping and publishing. In 1879 he came to Australia and established an extensive general mercantile business. In 1882 he married Julia Anna Tortat and they had one child, a son.

During the Boer War which is when Chipman resided at Carthona, he is reported to have organised a subscription fund to assist citizen soldiers who became known as the "Bushmen’s Contingent".

=== Harry Rickards ===
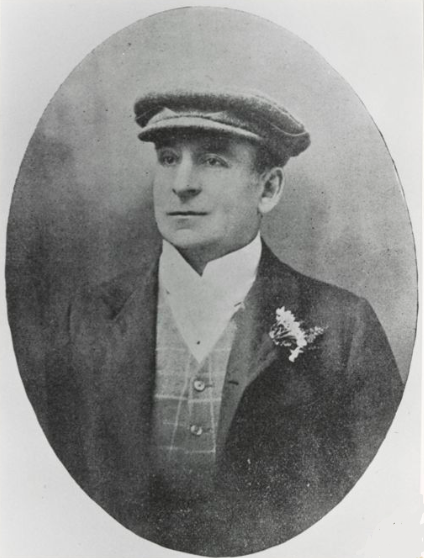
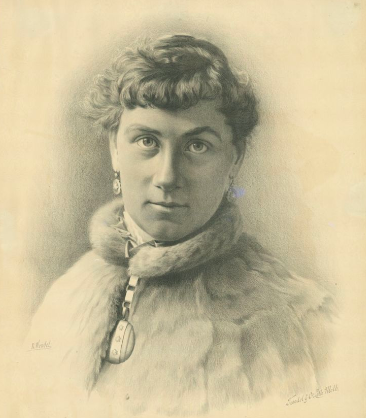
Harry Rickards and his wife Kate Rickards

In 1902 Harry Rickards bought Carthona after selling Craignest. Harry Rickards whose real name was Harry Benjamin Leete was born in 1843 in London. His first occupation was an engine driver but soon after he married Caroline Hayden in 1862 they both went on the stage. Harry was a singer and the couple toured in various countries including Australia during the 1870s.

In 1879 his wife divorced him and a year later he married Katie Angell, an acrobat and trapeze artiste. They had two daughters and for some years toured and performed mainly around Australasia. In 1892 Rickards made Sydney his headquarters and concentrated his efforts on owning or leasing theatres in the capital cities of Australia. In 1899 he bought the Sydney Tivoli Theatre and adjacent hotel. He went overseas annually to find suitable artists to bring to Australia and he is reported to have paid them generously.

The Rickards lived at Carthona for two years while Harry continued to establish his theatrical business. In 1904 he purchased the nearby property called Lansdowne which now forms part of McKell Park. He substantially demolished this building and built a large Federation style house which he called Canonbury.

=== Later owners ===
Marcus William Oldham bought Carthona in 1904 and resided there until 1911. He was born in 1869. In 1903 he married Jean Wedderburn Watson in Sydney. He is listed in the Electoral Roll as a pastoralist. He died in 1939 at his then home at Point Piper. He had considerable wealth and in his will he gave his wife a life interest in his estate but after that it was to be used for the purposes of establishing and maintaining a training school to be known as the Marcus Oldham Farm where Protestant boys could be educated in farming.

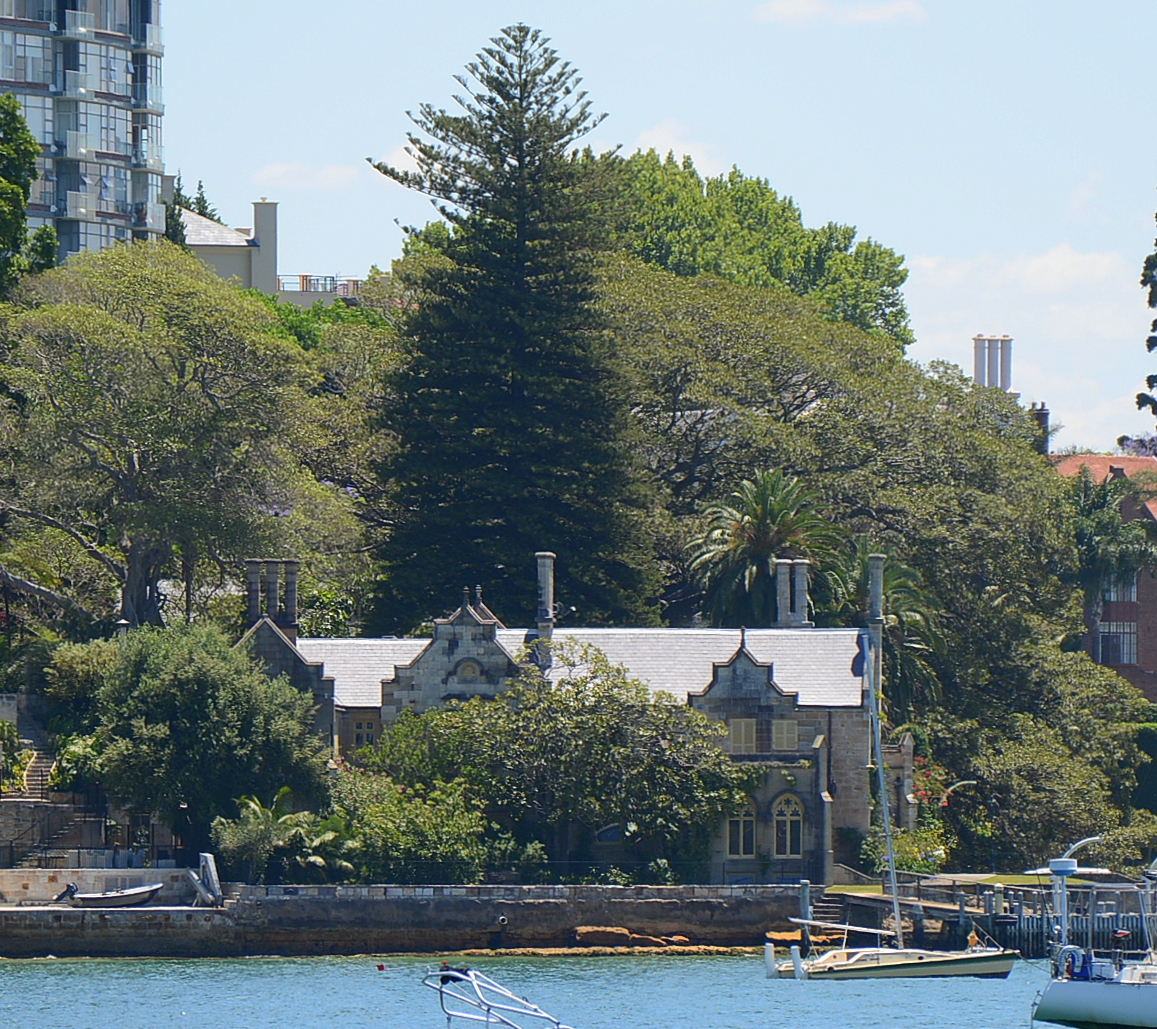
Carthona seen from Murray Rose Pool, Double Bay

Ernest Henry Charles Wunderlich was the next owner of Carthona. The house was put on the market in 1911 and purchased by Ernest Wunderlich for subdivision. Ernest Wunderlich was the brother of Alfred Wunderlich who subdivided Lindsay at about the same time. Carthona and the other blocks of land were advertised for sale in 1913.

Arthur Edward Hughes bought Carthona from Wunderlich in 1913 and retained it until 1939. He resided there until 1933, then moved to Leura. Carthona was rented as short-term accommodation for the next six years by Hughes and his wife. One notable resident during this time was William Lygon, 7th Earl Beauchamp, a former Governor of New South Wales. Hughes died in 1937 and Carthona was put on the market two years later.

Philip Bushell—of Bushell's Tea fame—bought Carthona in 1940 and the family has retained the house since then. In the mid 1950s Bushell purchased the waterfront gardens of the neighbouring Edgewater, 3–5 Sutherland Crescent, from Oliver Triggs. Bushell's heiress Amber Oxley passed the house on to her son, Anthony, making him the third generation of the family to live in the house. Anthony later married Roslyn Oxley, who ran an art gallery in Paddington, Sydney. In 2012 a new house was built into the hillside of the former Edgewater land (becoming 6 Carthona Avenue), for Amber's youngest son Christopher, who put up for sale the adjoining 9 Sutherland Crescent for $15m, then $10m, purchased in the 1970s and built in the 1930s (demolished in the 2020s).
