= Sévigny (disambiguation) =

Sévigny may refer to:

== Places ==
- Sévigny, Orne, a French commune in Lower Normandy
- Sévigny-la-Forêt, a French commune in Ardennes
- Sévigny-Waleppe, a French commune in Ardennes

== People with the surname ==
- Albert Sévigny, Canadian politician
- Bernard Sévigny, Canadian politician
- Chloë Sevigny, American actress
- Marie Sevigny, American nurse
- Melissa Sevigny, American science journalist
- Pierre Sévigny (politician), Canadian politician
- Pierre Sévigny (ice hockey), hockey player
- Richard Sevigny, hockey player

== See also ==
- Gabriel Beauchesne-Sévigny, Canadian athlete
- Geneviève Beauchesne-Sévigny, Canadian athlete
- Savigny (disambiguation)
- Thérèse Paquet-Sévigny, Canadian diplomat
