= Margherita Zenoni =

Italian opera singer

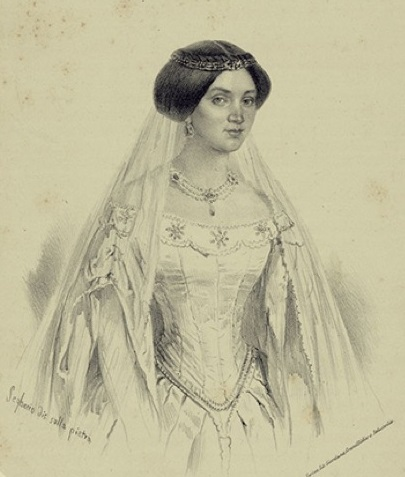
- Zenoni as Gemma di Vergy, 1854
- Born: c. 1827; Turin, Kingdom of Sardinia
- Died: 31 March 1878; Turin, Italy
- Other names: Margherita Zenoni-Gamboa; Margherita Zenoni-Occhiena
- Occupation: Opera singer (soprano)

Margherita Zenoni (c. 1827 (Note: The Ricordi archives give Zenoni's birth year as 1815. However, her 1878 death announcement in the Otago Daily Times gave her age as 51, making her birth year c. 1827. That date is more congruent with images of her in the early 1850s and with the timeline of her career.) – 31 March 1878) was an Italian opera singer who sang leading soprano roles in the opera houses of Italy and abroad from the early 1850s. She left Europe in 1867, first to sing with Annibale Biacchi's Italian opera company in Cuba and then to tour with Augusto Cagli's Italian opera company in Australasia. She remained with Cagli's company in its various incarnations until 1877, singing in India, Australia, New Zealand and South Africa. She died in Turin, her native city, less than a year after her return from South Africa.

== Early life and Italian career ==
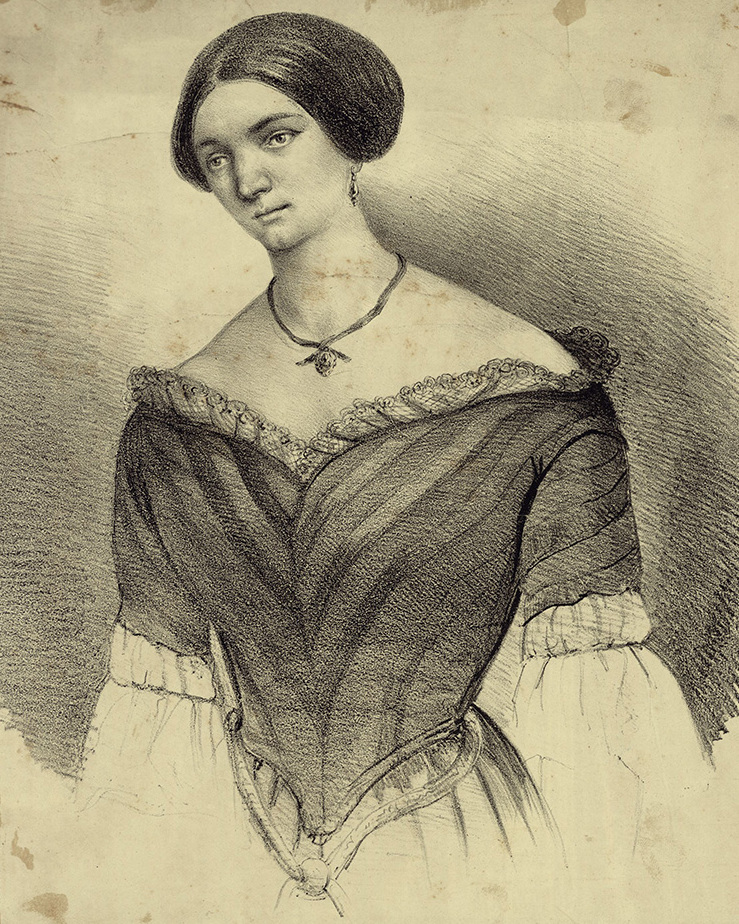
Portrait of Margherita Zenoni by Eugenio Yerna

Zenoni was born in Turin. She was initially self-taught and began her career in the late 1840s singing secondary roles in small theatres. Unable to make a breakthrough but possessed of a promising voice and stage presence, she was encouraged by music critics to get formal training. She became a pupil of Marcelliano Marcello who had opened a singing school in Turin and went on to further training with Carlo Boniforti at the Milan Conservatory. She made rapid progress and by the early 1850s was signed to various northern Italian opera houses as the prima donna assoluta. She had a triumphant debut at the Teatro Regio in Turin in 1854 in the title role of Donizetti's Gemma di Vergy. Later in her career she also sang the title roles in his La Favorita, Lucrezia Borgia, and Anna Bolena. She went on to sing many leading roles in Verdi's operas, including some of the earliest performances of his La traviata (as Violetta), Rigoletto (as Gilda) and Il trovatore (as Leonora). She also appeared in Verdi's I masnadieri (as Amalia), Nabucco (as Abigaille), Macbeth (as Lady Macbeth), Attila (as Odabella), Ballo in Maschera (as Amelia), and I due Foscari (as Lucrezia).

Francesco Regli wrote of her in 1860:

Wherever she sings she has shown herself to be an artist worthy of every praise, for she unites an exquisite sentiment, an ardent spirit and a dramatic talent that has few equals with a beautiful and charming voice. Margherita Zenoni is not only an impeccable singer. She is also an excellent actress. (Note: Original Italian: "In ogni luogo mostrò di essere un'artista degna di ogni encomio, poichè riunisce ad una bella e simpatica voce, educata alla pura scuola, uno squisito sentimento, un'anima ardente ed un valore drammatico a poche secondo. Margherita Zenoni, se è inappuntabile cantante, è un' attrice eziandio eccellente.")

According to Italian press articles on her benefit performances in several northern Italian opera houses, they were lavish affairs. (Note: Benefit performances, where one of the opera's singers or its composer received the box-office takings for a particular performance in addition to their salary, were a common practice in the 18th and 19th century opera world as was the presentation of gifts from the audience to the singer.) An account of her benefit night in 1857 at the Teatro Sociale in Rovereto described the audience screaming wildly and throwing flowers; garlands of roses, laurel, and carnations; gold coins; and poems in her honour onto the stage at the end of the performance. A large cornucopia filled with ribbons and flowers was brought onto the stage as well as a silk banner carried by an angel. She was then escorted to her lodgings by a torch-light parade composed of still-cheering audience members and the city's orchestra and chorus who proceeded to serenade her under her window.

Although Zenoni's career up to 1867 was primarily concentrated in the opera houses of northern Italy, she also sang in southern Italy at the Teatro San Carlo in Naples and the Teatro Piccinni in Bari and appeared abroad with touring Italian opera companies in Bucharest, Constantinople, Valencia, and Oviedo. In a gala performance at the Teatro del Fontán in Oviedo in 1864, she sang Abigaille in Nabucco opposite Giorgio Ronconi who had created the title role at its world premiere in 1842.

== India, Australasia, and South Africa ==
In December 1867 Zenoni sailed to New York and then on to Cuba where she appeared at the Teatro Tacón in Havana with an Italian opera troupe organized by Annibale Biacchi. After Havana she proceeded to India to join Augusto Cagli's Italian opera company as its prima donna assoluta for the 1868–69 season in Calcutta. She was an immediate success with the audiences, and Cagli tailored the company's repertoire to reflect her greatest successes on the Italian stage – modern, tragic operas. She remained with Cagli's troupe for the 1869–70 season and then signed with Giovanni Pompei's rival company who were performing in Bombay and the Dutch East Indies. Cagli and Pompei subsequently joined forces to create a composite company. Zenoni toured both Australia and New Zealand with them. While in Sydney she married Annibal Luis Gamboa on 23 September 1873. According to the marriage announcement in the Sydney Morning Herald, Gamboa was from Cádiz, Spain. He had also been on the ship with her when she sailed to New York on her way to Cuba in 1867.

Zenoni performed in Australia through the 1875 season appearing as Griselda in I Lombardi, Leonora in Il trovatore, Paolina in Poliuto, Amelia in Un ballo in maschera, and in the title roles of La Juive, Norma, Lucrezia Borgia, and Anna Bolena. Her next stop was South Africa where Cagli had begun producing opera seasons for Cape Town in 1876. For the 1877 season his latest venture was al fresco opera in the gardens of the Good Hope Masonic Lodge. The season proved disastrous. In January Zenoni had to sing through a cold in Lucrezia Borgia while strong winds buffeted singers and audience alike. Cagli then built a pavilion to partially enclose the performances, but in April a fire broke out which destroyed not only the pavilion and its stage but all of the company's scenery and props as well as the lead tenor's costume collection. Zenoni set sail for her native Italy in July 1877, a fact much lamented by the editor of The Cape Standard and Mail. She died in Turin in March of the following year. Her husband later remarried and died in Turin in 1899.

After her death, Zenoni's name briefly lived on in the entertainment world, albeit in vaudeville rather than opera. In 1878 the impresario Harry Rickards discovered that an artiste from another troupe was performing under the same name as Katie Angell, a young Australian trapeze artist who worked for Rickards and later became his second wife. He considered a lawsuit, but instead Angell changed her own stage name, and Rickards billed her as "Mademoiselle Zenoni. The Premier Lady Gymnast of the World." According to the Dictionary of Sydney, the name was inspired by the celebrity of Margherita Zenoni who was singing in Australia when Angell began her career.
