= William Scott (astronomer and priest) =

William Scott (8 October 1825 – 29 March 1917) was a Church of England priest and became the colonial astronomer for New South Wales.

== Background ==
Scott was born at Hartland, Devon, brought up at Braunton near Barnstaple, and educated at Blundell's School, Tiverton. In 1844 he went up as a scholar to Sidney Sussex College, Cambridge.

After a college fellowship Scott was given a mathematical lectureship in 1850. Made a deacon in 1849, he was ordained as a priest in 1850 by Bishop Turton of Ely and worked as a curate in the Cambridge slums of Barnwell.

Scott married a widow Elizabeth Anne Yonge, née Roberts on 8 November 1851. She had three sons by her first husband and the family responsibilities resulted in Scott becoming a mathematics coach (his first interest had always been in mathematics). He built up a useful connections at the university and later published a small textbook on plane co-ordinate geometry.

== Australia ==
In April 1856, Scott took the position of colonial astronomer in New South Wales. Scott arrived with his family in Sydney in October 1856 to find the astronomical works were somewhat neglected. He supervised the building of the Sydney Observatory at Dawes Point, ensured the appointment of an observatory board and established the keeping of meteorological records throughout the colony.

By 1859, Scott was making systematic observations and in 1861 the acquisition of an equatorial telescope enabled him to expand his work. Scott planned a magnetic survey of the colony and reported that, despite the shortage of staff and equipment, 'the establishment is now complete in every respect'.

On 31 October 1862, Scott resigned as astronomer giving the reason as ill health, also reported as failing eyesight. However, it seems likely that the reasons were the departure of his patron Governor Denison and public criticism of his refusal to produce 'showy results'. He found it difficult to adapt to colonial life but succeeded the Rev. W. H. Savigny as headmaster of the Cook's River collegiate school, which he removed to Elswick House, Leichhardt, and in 1865 took over from Savigny as warden of St Paul's College, Sydney (Australia's oldest University College). It was a quiet time at the college and his plans were hampered by the slow rate of university expansion, the competition of the new Presbyterian College of St Andrew and the Church's refusal to recognize education at St Paul's as sufficient training for the ministry. He continued as mathematical examiner for the university and twice deputized for the professor of mathematics. In 1867–74 he was honorary secretary of the Royal Society of New South Wales and treasurer in 1874–78. In 1874 he read a paper to the society on 'The transit of Venus as Observed at Eden' which was published in its Proceedings. In the 1870s he preached frequently on the relation of religion to new scientific ideas but his public activities were not matched by any considerable energy at St Paul's. In 1878 criticism by the college council caused him to resign.

Scott had earlier expressed an element of scepticism about revealed religion and had criticized the Sydney clergy. However, he took eagerly to a country ministry at Gunning, Bungendore and Queanbeyan and later became a canon of St Saviour's Cathedral, Goulburn, and examining chaplain for Bishop Thomas. He revisited England in 1888 and lived in retirement on his return. Scott died at Chatswood and is buried in the Gore Hill Cemetery. Scott's estate was valued for probate at the considerable sum of £7500.

== Bibliography ==
- G. B. Airy, Autobiography, W. Airy ed. (Cambridge, 1896);
- A. Fisher, The Register of Blundell's School, vol 1 (Exeter, 1904);
- R. T. Wyatt, The History of the Diocese of Goulburn (Syd, 1937);
- Colonial astronomer papers, Votes and Proceedings (Legislative Assembly, New South Wales), 1856–57, 21, 1858–59, 1, 841, 843, 1859–60, 4, 1047, 1861, 2, 395, 1861–62, 2, 1371, 1865, 1, 915;
- Royal Society of New South Wales, Proceedings, 51 (1917), 6;
- K. J. Cable, 'The founding of St Paul's College', Pauline, 1967, no 65;
- Sydney Morning Herald, 31 March 1917;
- Scott letters (copies, State Library of New South Wales);
- Council minutes 1865–78 (St Paul's College, University of Sydney)
