= John Clemons =

Australian lawyer and politician

The Honourable John Clemons
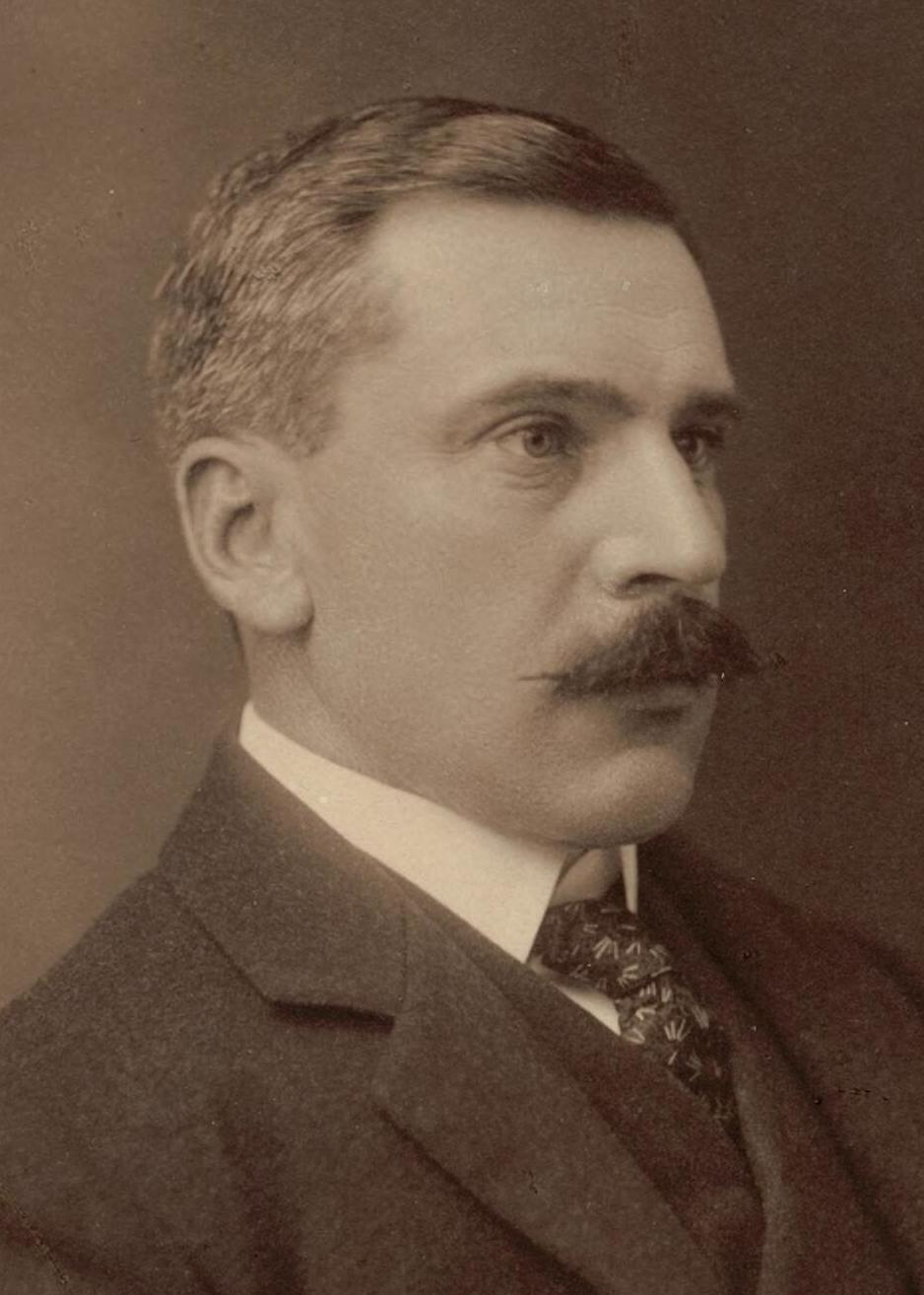

Senator for Tasmania
- In office 29 March 1901 – 5 September 1914

Personal details
- Born: 24 March 1862 Launceston, Tasmania
- Died: 10 November 1944 (aged 82) Oxford, England
- Party: Free Trade (1901–06); Anti-Socialist (1906–09); Liberal (1909–14)
- Spouse: Edith Savigny (m. 1889; died 1944)
- Relations: William Savigny (brother-in-law)

John Singleton Clemons (24 March 1862 – 10 November 1944) was an Australian lawyer and politician. He served as a Senator for Tasmania from 1901 to 1914, representing the Free Trade Party until 1909 and then the Liberal Party. He served as an honorary minister in the government of Joseph Cook from 1913 to 1914.

== Early life ==
Clemons was born on 24 March 1862 in Launceston, Tasmania. He was the oldest of eight children born to Anne Alicia (née Tucker) and John Nicholas Clemons. His father was a schoolteacher from Devon, England, who had been recruited to the colony in 1855. Clemons began his education at the public school in Evandale before going on to Launceston Church Grammar School. In 1880, he was awarded a Tasmanian government scholarship to attend the University of Oxford, where he studied law. After being called to the bar in England, he returned to Tasmania and practised law in Launceston; he also had "wide mining interests".

== Politics ==
Clemons unsuccessfully stood for the House of Assembly seat of Launceston at the 1900 general election. The following year, at the inaugural federal election, he was elected to the Senate with the endorsement of the Australian Free Trade and Liberal Association. He subsequently joined the parliamentary Free Trade Party and was elected as its Senate whip.

In 1904 Clemons supported the Reid government, although describing himself as independent "to a certain extent". In the Senate he opposed the high-tariff policies of the Protectionist Party and Australian Labor Party (ALP), also speaking frequently on Tasmanian issues. He was a fiscal conservative, opposing the Trans-Australian Railway, the construction of Canberra, and increased defence spending.

Clemons was re-elected in 1906 and joined the Liberal Party following the Fusion of 1909. After his re-election in 1913 he was appointed as an honorary minister in the Cook government, in order to give Tasmania a presence in the ministry. He was defeated at the 1914 election following a double dissolution. In December 1913, Clemons collapsed in the Senate following a "verbal attack" from Tasmanian ALP senator James Long. He recovered quickly although one source described the collapse as a "paralytic stroke".

== Personal life ==
In 1889 Clemons married Edith Savigny, the daughter of William Henry Savigny, headmaster of Launceston Church Grammar School, and sister of William "Beau" Savigny, with whom he practised law. The couple had three sons, all of whom served in World War I. They retired to England after his defeat, living in Cheltenham and only visiting Tasmania on a few occasions. He died at his son's home in Oxford on 10 November 1944, aged 82, having been predeceased by his wife a few days earlier.
