= William Savigny =

Australian cricketer (1864–1922)

Personal information
- Born: 17 February 1864; Sydney, Australia
- Died: 6 August 1922 (aged 58); Burwood, New South Wales, Australia
- Batting: Right-handed
- Bowling: Right-arm

Domestic team information
- Years: Team
- 1888/89–1895/96: Tasmania
- Source: Cricinfo, 14 January 2016

William Henry Savigny (17 February 1864 – 6 August 1922) was an Australian cricketer and academic.

== Biography ==
Savigny was born in Sydney, the elder son of Rev. William Henry Savigny, from 1872 headmaster of Launceston Church Grammar School, and educated at his father's school. He won a scholarship to Corpus Christi College, Oxford University, where he earned his BA degree in law and a blue for rowing.

While at Oxford he played two two-day matches for Shropshire in 1885 while also playing club cricket at Shrewsbury. He played four first-class matches for Tasmania between 1888 and 1896.

He returned to Launceston, where he practised law with his brother-in-law John Singleton Clemons, then when Clemons entered politics (he became one of Tasmania's first Senators) he took a position with Sydney Grammar School and for 26 years taught English and Classics and coached athletics and the college rowing teams.

Savigny died after suffering a stroke while riding his bicycle in the Sydney suburb of Strathfield. In 1923 a memorial in the form of a brass plaque was unveiled at Sydney Grammar School in his memory.

== Family ==
Savigny married Mary Eveline Smith ( – 22 July 1938) in Sheffield, England, on 18 March 1890 and had two daughters:

- Katherine Savigny (15 February 1891 – )
- Ellen Maude Savigny (25 March 1895 – )

His brother John Savigny was a noted cricketer.
