= Savigny, Haute-Marne =

Savigny
- Commune
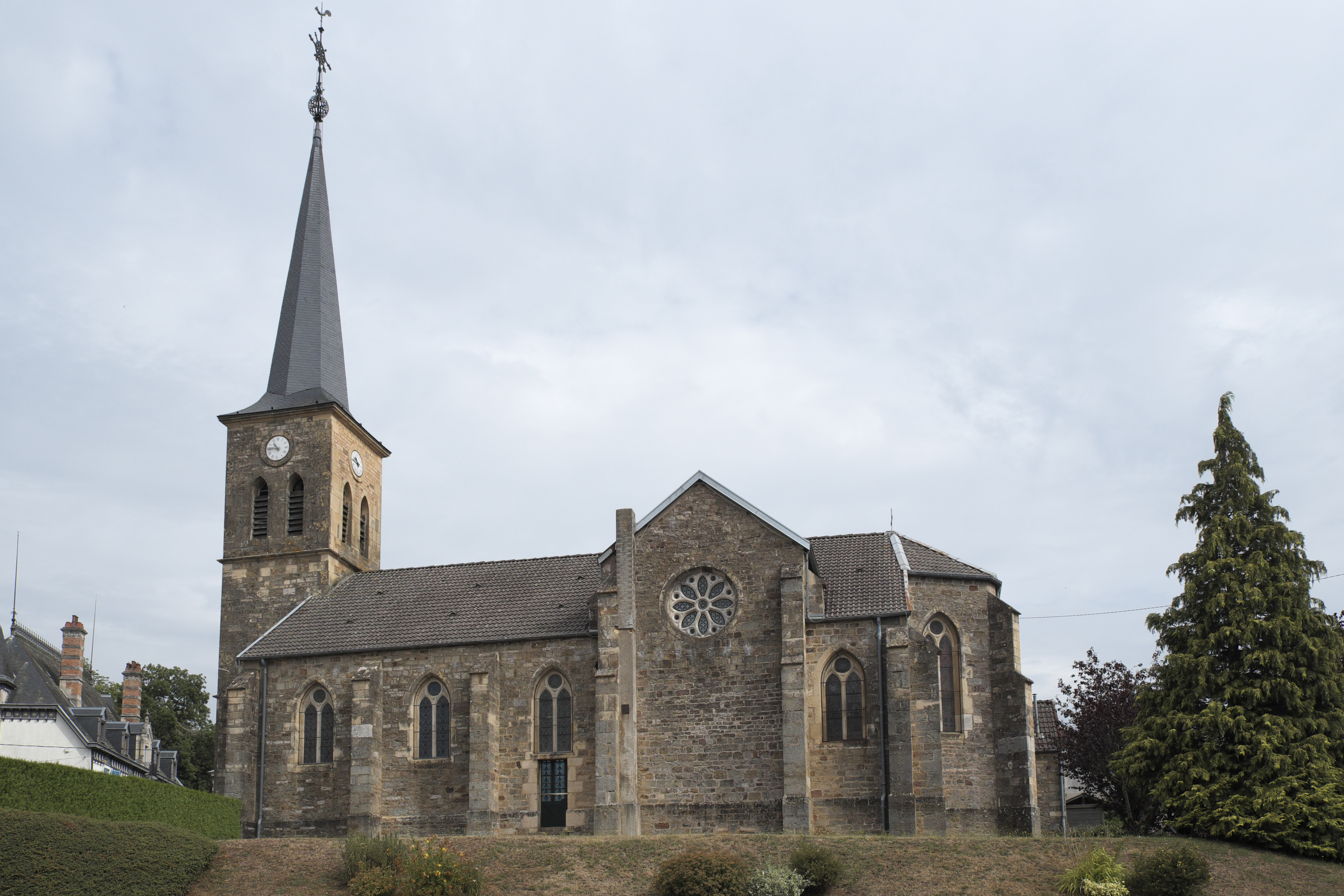
- The church in Savigny

- Coat of arms
- Location of Savigny
- Location within France Location within Grand Est
- Coordinates: 47°42′58″N 5°38′51″E
- Country: France
- Region: Grand Est
- Department: Haute-Marne
- Arrondissement: Langres
- Canton: Chalindrey
- Intercommunality: Savoir-Faire

Government
  - Mayor (2020–2026): Angélique Aignelot
- Area^{1}: 6.19 km^{2} (2.39 sq mi)
- Elevation: 380 m (1,250 ft)
- Highest elevation: 333 m (1,093 ft)
- Lowest elevation: 271 m (889 ft)
- Population (2023): 58
  - Density: 9.4/km^{2} (24/sq mi)
- Time zone: UTC+01:00 (CET)
  - Summer (DST): UTC+02:00 (CEST)
- INSEE/Postal code: 52467 /52500
- ^{1} French Land Register data, which excludes lakes, ponds, glaciers > 1 km^{2} (0.386 sq mi or 247 acres) and river estuaries.

Savigny (French pronunciation: [saviɲi]) is a commune in the Haute-Marne department in north-eastern France.

== See also ==
- Communes of the Haute-Marne department
