= W. H. Savigny =

Australian academic (1825–1889)

Rev. William Henry Savigny MA (May 1825 – 5 August 1889) was an Australian academic, born in England. His elder son, also named William Henry Savigny (17 February 1864 – 6 August 1922) was a longtime master at Sydney Grammar School.

== History ==
Savigny was born in Upton, Worcestershire, the only son of William Henry Savigny (1792–1828), a Church of England vicar, and his wife Mary Anne Savigny, nḗe Cooksey (1800–1872). He graduated BA from Worcester College, Oxford, and for a while taught in England, then in India. At some stage he was Vice-principal of the Collegiate School, Sheffield.

In 1853 Savigny and his mother arrived in New South Wales, where in December 1853 he founded a grammar school in Newcastle, also serving, without payment, as minister of Christ Church Cathedral to early 1855.

He moved his school to "Tempe", a mansion on Cooks River Road, Cooks River, which commenced on On 24 July 1855. In 1857–8 he helped the Misses Cooksey (Note: Catherine Cooksey (died 14 January 1885) and Sarah Cooksey (died in Launceston 27 February 1886) were aunts of the Rev. W. H. Savigny, sisters of his mother.) establish a school for girls in "Carthona", the historic home of Sir Thomas Mitchell. He was succeeded at Cook's River in 1862 by Rev. William Scott, previously Government Astronomer.

"Bay View House", his residence nearby, became a private lunatic asylum.

He served as Warden at St Paul's (theological) College, and was in 1865 succeeded by Rev. Scott.

He founded a Collegiate School in Bathurst, New South Wales which commenced on 20 July 1865. In 1872 he left for Launceston, Tasmania, where he succeeded the Rev. W. A. Brooke as head of the Church Grammar School.

This left Bathurst without a secondary school, and Bishop Marsden, among others, founded what became All Saints' College, which opened late in 1873 (St Stanislaus' College was founded by the Roman Catholic church in September of that year).

He retired in 1885 and died at his home, "Carthona", 37 Lyttleton Street, Launceston.

== Family ==
He married Ellen Solly (died 7 March 1893) at All Saints' District Church, Hunters Hill on 15 December 1859. (Note: The Launceston Cricket Club was forced to forfeit the match against Tamar that week owing to the unavailability of the Savigny brothers.)

- Ellen Mary Savigny (10 October 1860 – 15 November 1861)
- Edith Hope Savigny (15 December 1861 – ) on 7 January 1889 married John Singleton Clemons barrister with the Launceston firm of Douglas, Collins, and Davies.
- William Henry Savigny (17 February 1864 – 6 August 1922) cricketer and master at Sydney Grammar School
- John Horatio Savigny (25 August 1867 – 11 February 1923) was a famous cricketer. He married Emily Henry, daughter of John Henry, in 1891.

His mother, Mary Anne Savigny, died in Hobart on 22 May 1872.

== Recognition ==
One of the houses of Launceston Church Grammar School is named "Savigny"
