= Marie Sevigny =

American nurse

Sevigny, circa 1935

Marie Sevigny was an American nurse who was accused of murdering one of her patients, 47-year-old L. Valmore Normandin, in 1935 in Woonsocket, Rhode Island in order to end her suffering. Three of Sevigny's other patients had also died. She confessed after a two-day police interrogation. However, Normandin's death was ruled a suicide and Sevigny was found not guilty. The police's methods were criticized. The case received nationwide attention. She formerly lived in St. Johnsbury, Vermont.
