= John Savigny =

Australian cricketer (1867–1923)

Personal information
- Full name: John Horatio Savigny
- Born: 25 August 1867; Bathurst, New South Wales, Australia
- Died: 11 February 1923 (aged 55); Carrick, Tasmania, Australia
- Batting: Right-handed
- Bowling: Right-arm off-spin, leg-spin

Domestic team information
- Years: Team
- 1888–1911: Tasmania

Career statistics
Competition	First-class
Matches	13
Runs scored	648
Batting average	29.45
100s/50s	1/3
Top score	164*
Balls bowled	203
Wickets	5
Bowling average	30.60
5 wickets in innings	0
10 wickets in match	0
Best bowling	2/25
Catches/stumpings	9/–
- Source: Cricinfo, 30 October 2026

John Horatio Savigny (25 August 1867 – 11 February 1923) was an Australian cricketer. He played 13 first-class matches for Tasmania between 1888 and 1911.

Savigny attended Launceston Church Grammar School, where his father William Henry Savigny was headmaster. His brother William was also a fine cricketer, playing in three matches for Tasmania against Victoria.

Savigny was an opening batsman. His highest score was 164 not out against the touring English team in 1903–04, after Tasmania had trailed by 212 on the first innings. He also represented the North of Tasmania team in their matches against South of Tasmania for more than 20 years. In club cricket in the North, he was the first batsman to score 1000 runs in a season and the first to score a double-century. He was an influential coach of club and school cricketers in Launceston for many years.

Savigny was employed as a clerk with the Customs Department at Launceston. On 6 April 1891 he married Emily Henry (c. 1869 – 22 September 1930), second daughter of John Henry, Treasurer of Tasmania. They had a son and a daughter.

Savigny died on the bank of the Liffey River near Carrick, where he had gone fishing, and apparently died while dozing. His wife died at the family home, "Carthona", Ashby Street, Launceston.
