= Harry Rickards =

Australian comedian

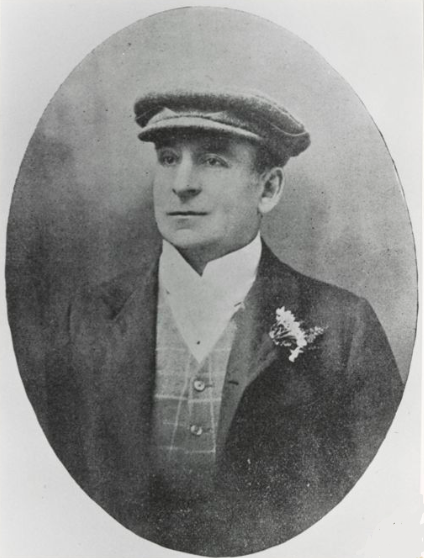
- Born: Henry Benjamin Leete; 4 December 1843; Stratford, London, UK
- Died: 13 October 1911 (aged 67); Croydon, Surrey, UK
- Occupations: vaudeville artiste; theatre impresario
- Spouse: Kate Rickards

Harry Rickards (4 December 1843 – 13 October 1911), born Henry Benjamin Leete, was an English-born baritone, comedian and theatre owner, most active in vaudeville and stage, first in his native England and then Australia after emigrating in 1871.

== Early life ==
Rickards was born in Stratford, London, England, the son of Benjamin Halls Leete, a printer and later chief engineer of the Egyptian railways and his wife Mary (née Watkins). Harry began an apprenticeship as an engineer. He married Caroline Hayden on 10 March 1862 at Bromley.

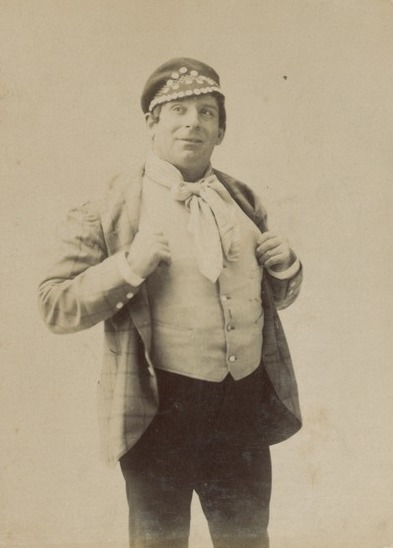
Harry Rickards c.1870-1900 Collection State Library Victoria (Australia)

== Theatrical career ==
Rickards became a comic singer, performing at music halls in Canterbury and Oxford under the stage name "Harry Rickards". He travelled to Australia and arrived in Melbourne on 28 November 1871. Finding himself in debt in 1874, he toured the United States, returning to London the following year, and also toured a company in South Africa in 1876. He returned to Australia in 1885 and toured the country as part of a vaudeville company. Known in the trade as "the Guv'nor", he had able lieutenants in his brother Jack Leete in Sydney and brother-in-law Fred Aydon in Melbourne.

== Personal life, death and legacy ==
Rickards had diabetes and died from apoplexy in Croydon, England, on 13 October 1911. His body was returned to Australia to be buried in Waverley Cemetery, Sydney. He was married twice and left a widow, Kate Rickards, a trapeze artist, acrobat and performer, and two daughters. His younger daughter Madge Rickards married the singer and actor Frank Harwood in July 1909.

His theatrical interests were acquired by the entrepreneur Hugh D. McIntosh.
