= Paddington, New South Wales =

Suburb of Sydney, New South Wales, Australia

Paddington
- Suburb
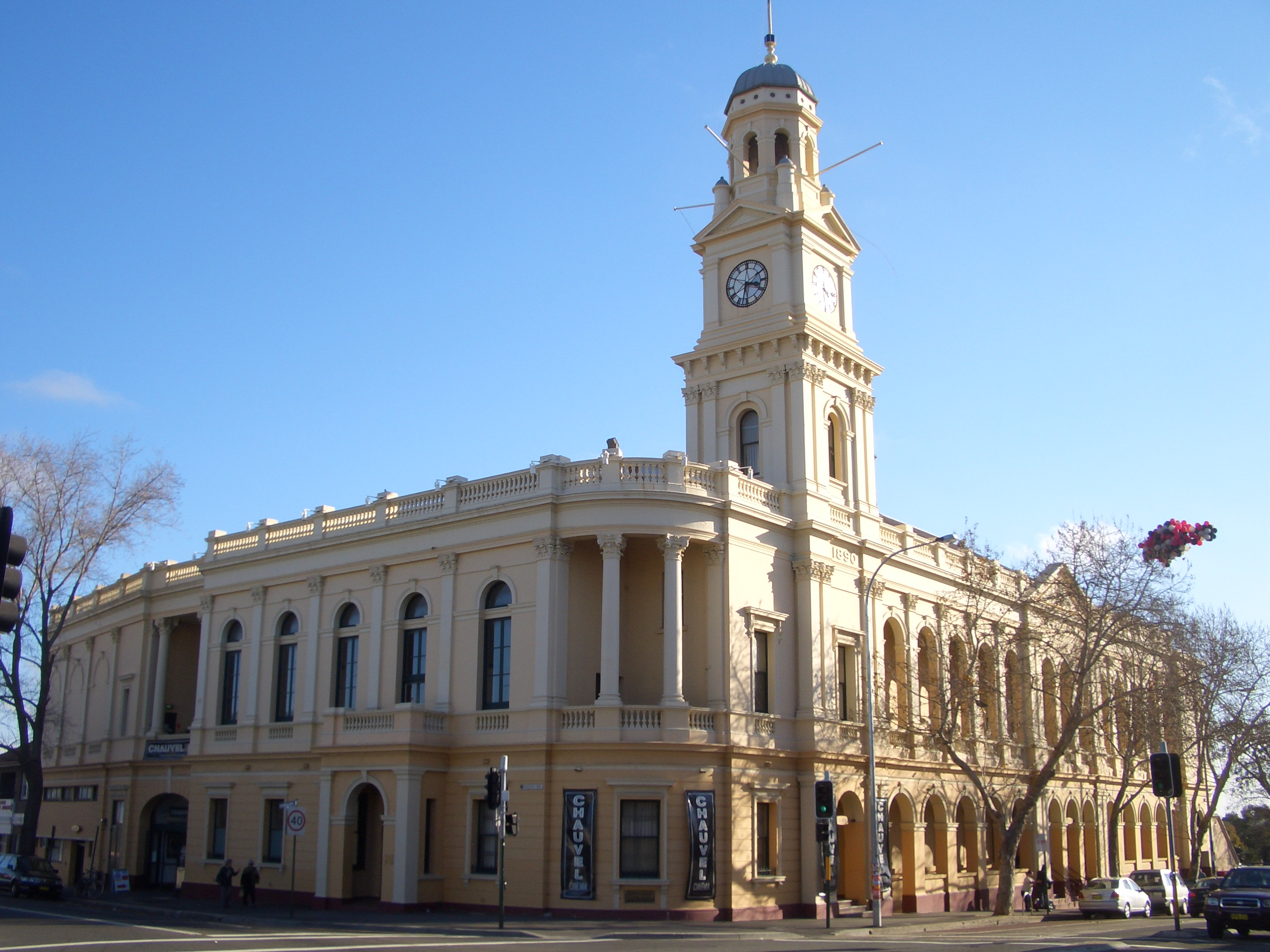
- Paddington Town Hall

- Interactive map of Paddington
- Country: Australia
- State: New South Wales
- City: Sydney
- LGAs: City of Sydney; Municipality of Woollahra
- Location: 3 km (1.9 mi) east of Sydney CBD

Government
  - State electorate: Sydney
  - Federal division: Wentworth

Area
  - Total: 1.63 km^{2} (0.63 sq mi)
- Elevation: 68 m (223 ft)

Population
  - Total: 12,701 (SAL 2021)
  - Density: 7,792/km^{2} (20,180/sq mi)
- Postcode: 2021
Suburbs around Paddington
Darlinghurst	Rushcutters Bay	Edgecliff
Darlinghurst	Paddington	Woollahra
Surry Hills	Moore Park	Centennial Park

Paddington is a suburb of Sydney in the state of New South Wales, Australia. Located 3 kilometres (1.9 mi) east of the Sydney central business district, Paddington lies across two local government areas. The portion south of Oxford Street lies within the City of Sydney, while the portion north of Oxford Street lies within the Municipality of Woollahra. It is often colloquially referred to as "Paddo".

Paddington is bordered to the west by Darlinghurst, to the east by Centennial Park and Woollahra, to the north by Edgecliff and Rushcutters Bay and to the south by Moore Park.

== History ==
=== Aboriginal people ===
The suburb of Paddington is considered to be part of the region associated with the stories of the Cadigal people. These people belonged to the Dharug (or Eora) language group, which includes what is now known as the Sydney central business district. It is known that the ridge, being the most efficient route, on which Oxford Street was built was also a walking track used by Aboriginal people. Much of the Aboriginal population (estimated at the time to be ca. 1000 people) of Sydney died due to the smallpox outbreak of 1789, one year after the First Fleet arrived in Sydney. Some Anthropologists maintain that the tribe moved to other areas of the shared Dharug language group. At the time when Robert Cooper began to build his first house in Paddington, approximately 200 Koori people were living in Woolloomooloo in housing which Governor Macquarie had built for them.

Post European settlement, Paddington has generally not been a suburb with a dense Indigenous population. In the 1930s, when parts of Sydney such as Redfern and Glebe became hubs for Aboriginal people entering the labour force, Paddington continued to be a suburb mostly inhabited by European working-class people..

=== European settlement ===
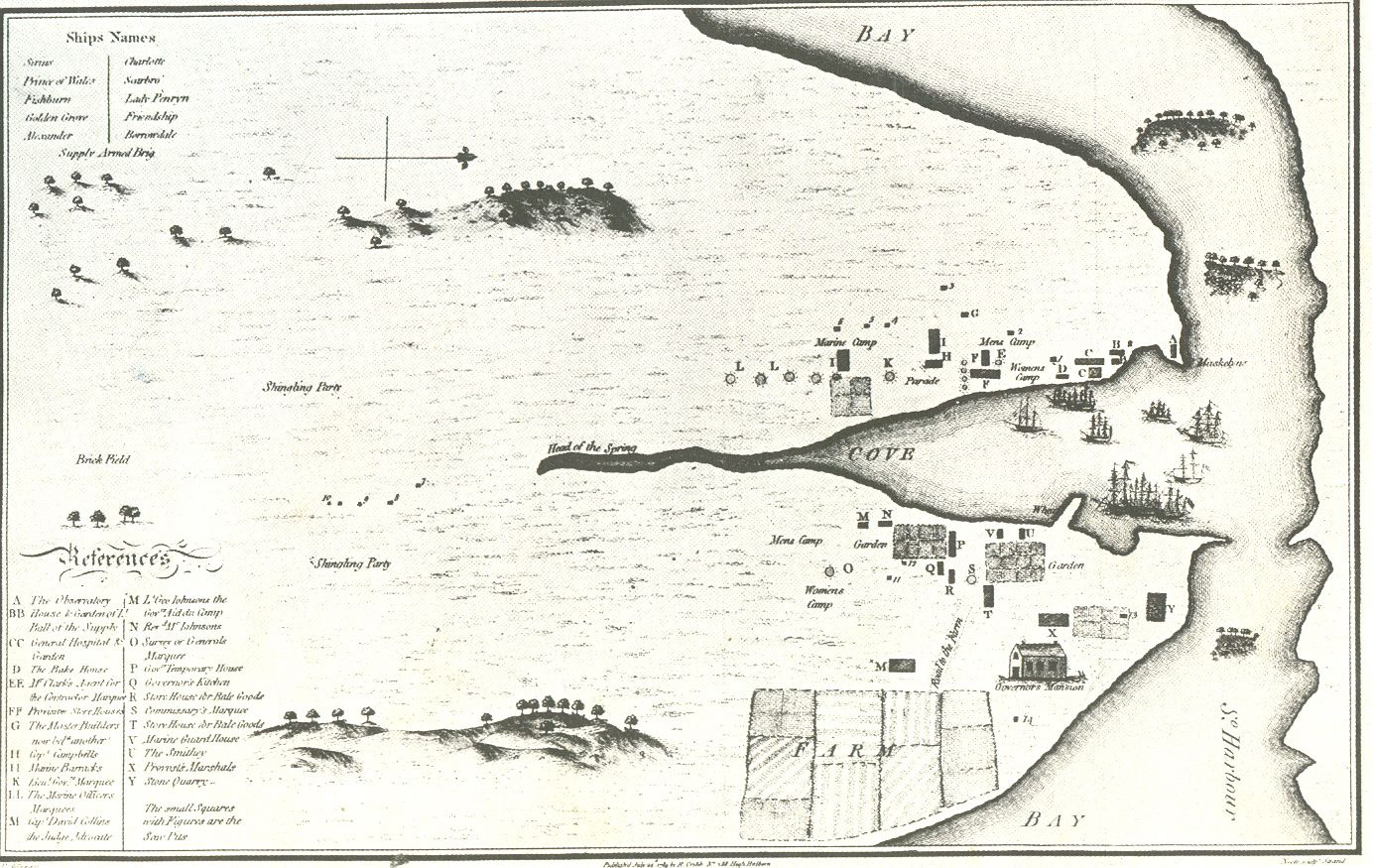
Very early map of First Fleet settlement at Sydney drawn by a transported convict c. 1789

1788–1800

In 1788 the First Fleet arrived in Sydney Harbour and established a settlement in Sydney Cove. Three kilometres to the east lay the land that would become Paddington. With a high sandstone ridge, eroded by streams leading to a marshy rush-filled cove too shallow for ships, the area was ignored by the newcomers, except for collecting rushes for thatch.

1801–1840

On a path used by local Aboriginal people, a road of some form was built by Governor Hunter to South Head as early as 1803. Governor Macquarie upgraded the road in 1811 for strategic purposes to accommodate wheeled vehicles. The road was improved by Major Druitt in 1820 to give faster access to the signal station at South Head. It was also to give access to the salubrious villas built by the colony's emerging plutocracy. The road was renamed the Old South Head Road after construction of New South Head Road along the Harbour foreshore was begun in 1831.

The first land grant in the Paddington area, of 100 acres (40.4 hectares), was made to Robert Cooper, James Underwood, and Francis Ewen Forbes by Governor Brisbane in 1823, allowing them to commence work on the Sydney distillery at the eastern end of Glenmore Road. A mill was located at the end of Gordon Street and run by the Gordon family grinding wheat from the early 1830s. It remained a prominent feature of the local landscape as houses were built, and as wind power was replaced by steam.

Cooper built his mansion, Juniper Hall, on the South Head Road ridge while Underwood built his house on Glenmore Road, between today's Soudan Lane and the former distillery. The suburb's name came about when in October 1839 James Underwood subdivided 50 of his 97 acres. He called his subdivision the Paddington Estate after the London Borough of that name. It extended from Oxford Street down to present day Paddington Street.

1841–1900

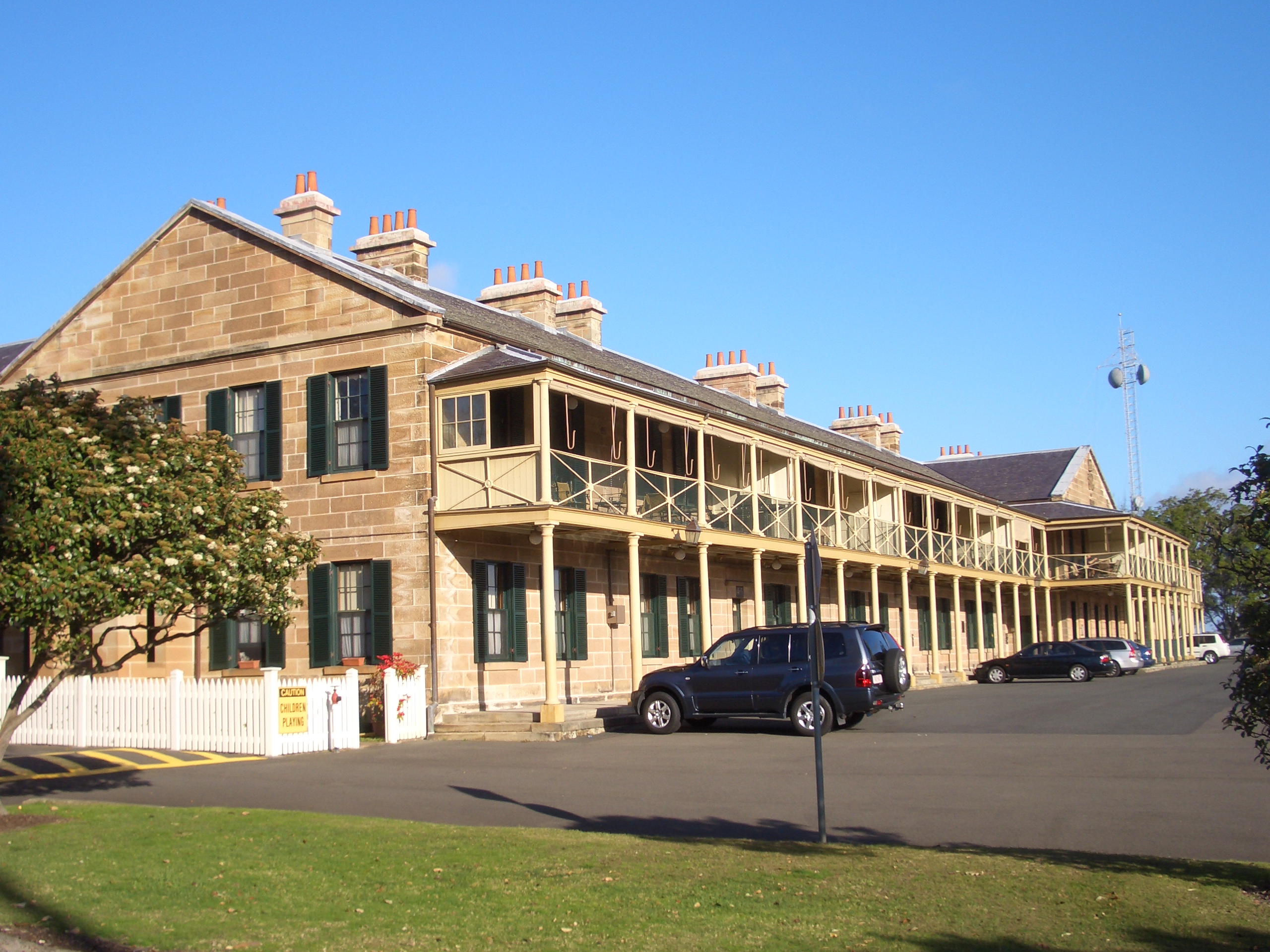
Officer's quarters, Victoria Barracks

After the commencement in 1841 of Victoria Barracks the village of Paddington soon emerged, much of it around the cottages of the many artisans –stonemasons, quarrymen, carpenters and labourers – who were working on the construction of the Barracks. What emerged was a clear class distinction; the working-class located largely on or near the South Head Road and the emerging gentry living in villas facing the harbour in 'Rushcutters Valley'.

Rapid growth followed, with large estates being subdivided for speculative terrace style housing. In 1862 there were 535 houses with 2,800 residents. By 1883 the number of houses increased to 2,347. In 1871 Paddington's population density was 10.2 people per acre. By 1891 it had jumped 44.1.

1901–2000

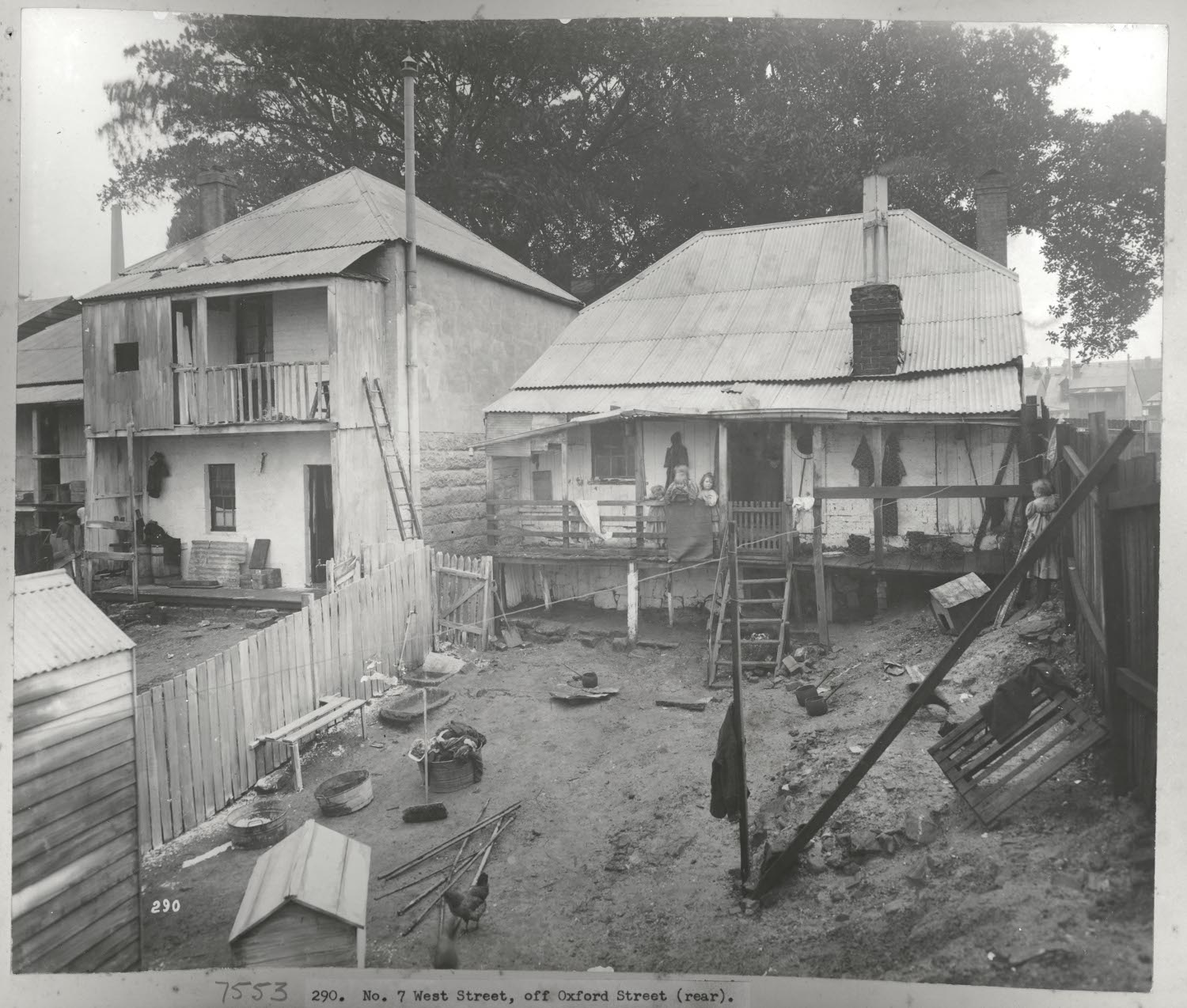
Cottages in West Street, off Oxford Street, at the time of the Bubonic Plague in Sydney c. 1900

In the first decade of the twentieth century Paddington was in its prime, with the population reaching 26,000 living in 4,800 houses. General health improved with the area being sewered.

The World War I left a legacy of social problems, tensions and alcohol abuse. Paddington suffered death rates of 5 per 1000 residents in the influenza epidemic of 1919. Developers were disparaging about densely populated areas like Paddington, describing them as unhealthy, and promoting sanitised garden suburbs such as Haberfield. In Paddington the unskilled, those with a trade and those renting were hit hard during the Depression, with 30% unemployment.

The post-war County of Cumberland planning scheme for metropolitan Sydney slated Paddington as a slum ripe for total redevelopment. A 1947 map titled 'Paddington Replanning' proposed demolition of virtually all existing housing to be replaced by blocks of flats. However, with the newly arrived migrants from Europe finding Paddington affordable and a convenient place to live, slum clearance faded from the political agenda. In the 1960s, a middle class 'Bohemian' invasion began and Paddington became very 'multi-cultural'.

From 1960 many professional people, many who may have returned from living abroad, recognised Paddington's potential, particularly the suburb's close proximity to the CBD. With the restoration of often derelict houses there developed a new awareness and interest in the historical and aesthetic qualities of the area. In 1968 in a complete reversal of planning and housing orthodoxy at the time, four hundred acres of terrace housing was rezoned as the first conservation area in Australia. The resident action group, the Paddington Society, founded in 1964, was a catalyst in this development.

Heritage Conservation Status of Paddington

Paddington is a rare and largely intact example of an early Victorian residential suburb. Its unique qualities may be attributed to its close proximity to the city, the topography of its harbour location, the process of development and subdivision of early land grants, and the short period in the late 19thC in which it was largely built out.

The distinctly Australian 'terrace' evolved from earlier Georgian and Regency models to form an exceptionally cohesive dormitory suburb. The heritage conservation status of Paddington, its streets and houses, its rooms and details is recognised as being of National and State significance.

With this conservation status comes an obligation for all generations to look after the place, in all its detail, so as to retain its cultural and heritage significance for future generations. We are but custodians of our heritage. Source: The Paddington Society

The aforementioned preservation of prominent Victorian architecture has drawn comparisons to London. In 1996, one travel journalist visiting Sydney for The New York Times noted, "in a city often said to look Californian–indeed, the 1920s California bungalow is a common type of suburban home–Paddington, also known as Paddo, more closely resembles parts of London, particularly given the predominance of the London terrace".

In 2019, the first history of Paddington in 40 years was published.

== Commercial areas ==
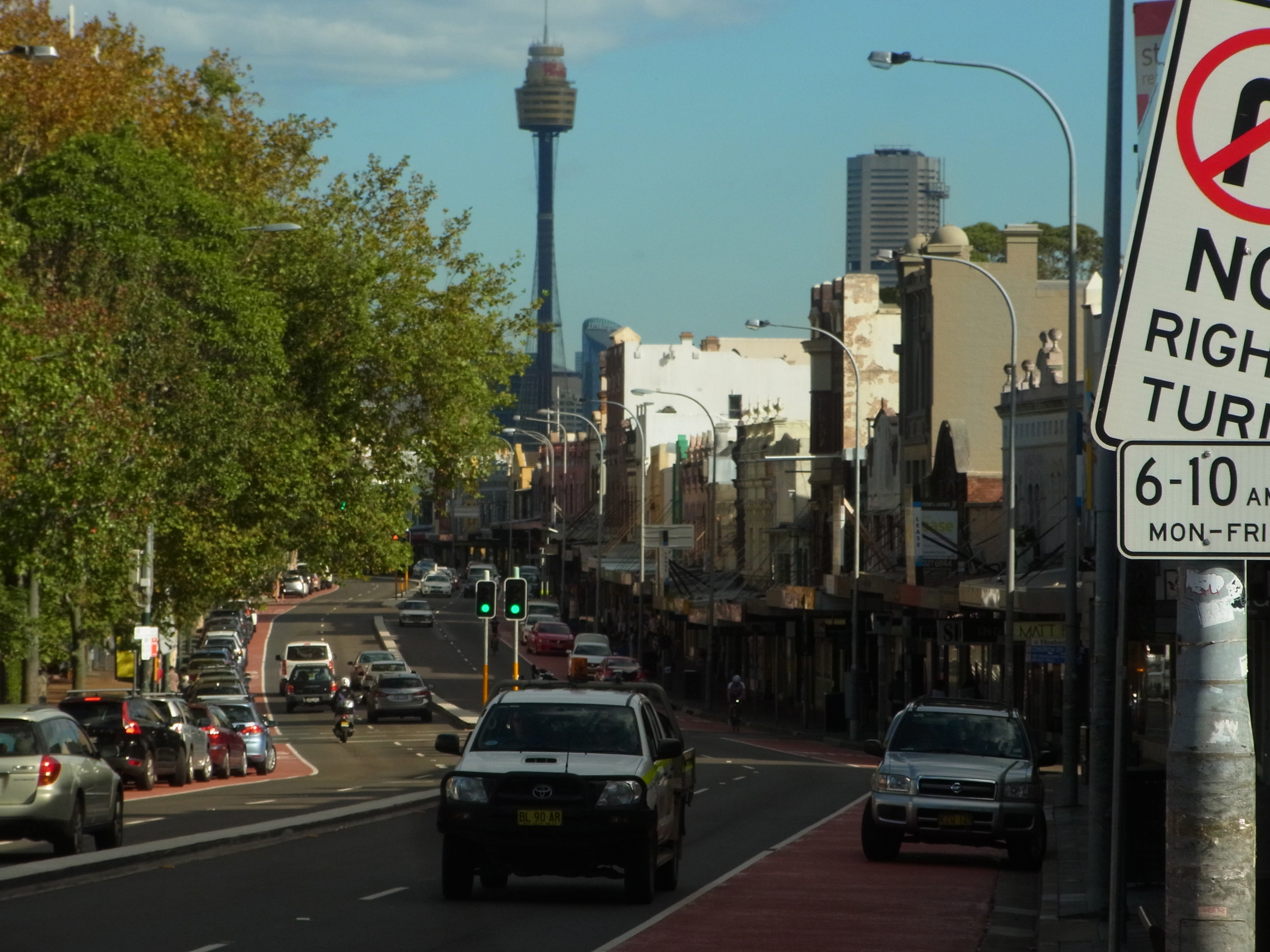
Oxford Street with Sydney Tower in the background

Commercial activity in Paddington is diverse and can be divided into a number of precincts:

=== Oxford Street ===
Oxford Street is a one kilometre long shopping strip extending unbroken the length of Paddington, at least on the north side of the street. While there is a range of speciality shops and cafes, it is the plethora of clothing boutiques that has put Oxford Street on the tourist map. Bookstores and cinema are located at the Darlinghurst end, while pop-up shops and personal services, hair, nails and massage, are becoming more prevalent closer to Woollahra. With AM and PM bus lanes in operation on week days along Oxford Street, lack of parking is an issue for retailers, as are the high rents. Since around 2000, low-rise retail/office developments, such on the former site of the Royal Hospital for Women, have complemented the 19th century scale of Oxford Street, unlike the bulky multi-storey Telstra overseas communications building that opened in 1960.

=== Paddington Markets ===
The Paddington Markets has been held every Saturday in the grounds of the heritage-listed Paddington Uniting Church on Oxford Street since 1973. The market was established to persuade local craftspeople, designers of fashion, artists and jewellery makers to display and sell their wares.

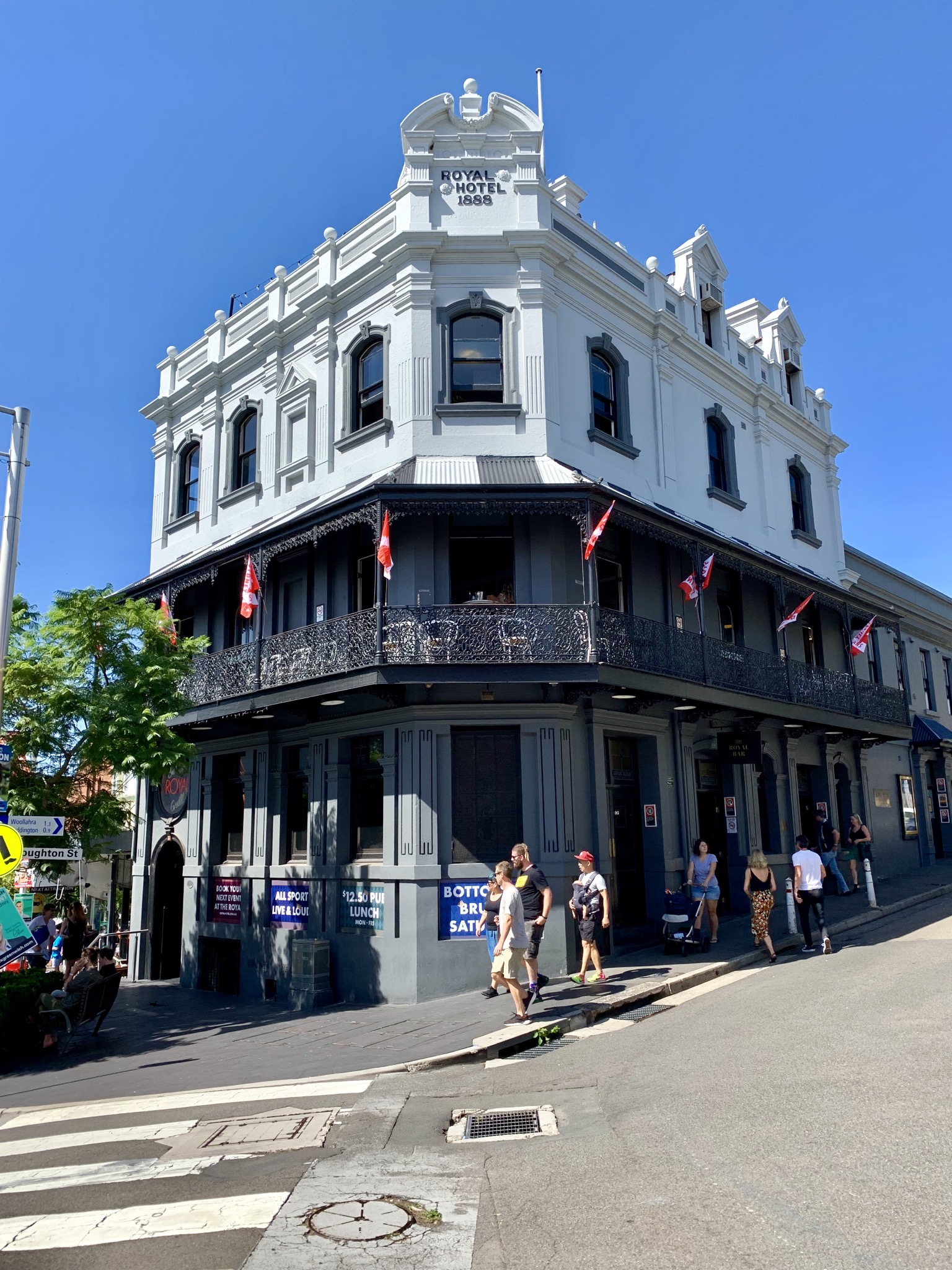
The Royal Hotel

=== William Street ===
William Street off Oxford Street, is where an eclectic bunch of designers and traders sell their wares from the tiny shops and terrace houses. The William Street Festival has been held every September since 2009.

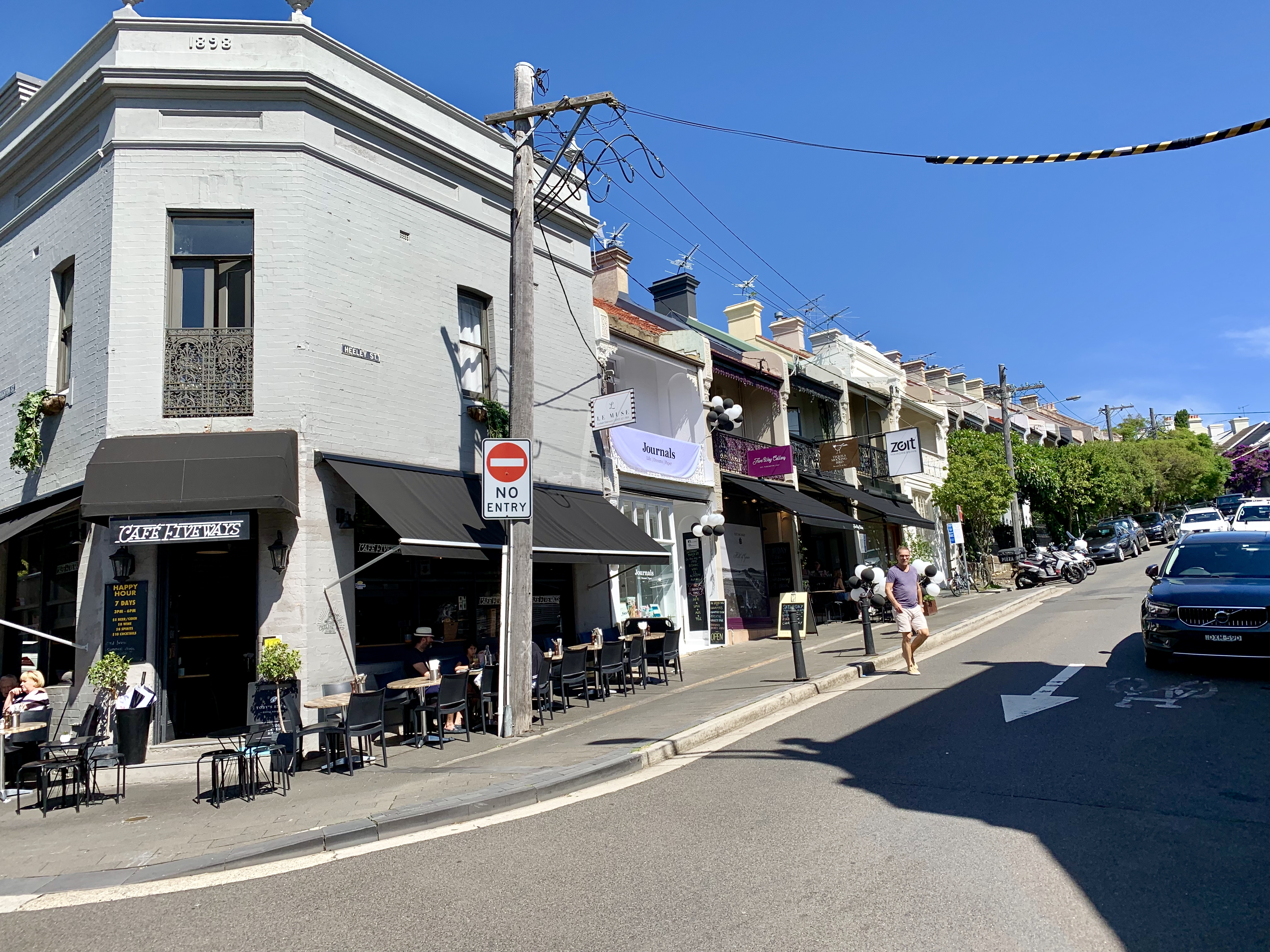
Fiveways

=== Five Ways ===
Five Ways is an intersection with a village atmosphere located in the northern, harbour facing part of Paddington. As well as providing for the day-to-day needs for residents, Five Ways offers a wide range of eateries with al fresco dining.

=== Back streets ===
In the leafy back streets the numerous hotels are matched by the proliferation of galleries, interior design, antique dealers and restaurants. Despite the advent of shopping malls at Bondi Junction and Edgecliff, corner shops can still be found in many streets including: Albion, Boundary, Elizabeth, Flinders, Gordon, Hopetoun, McDonald, Regent and Underwood Streets.

== Transport ==
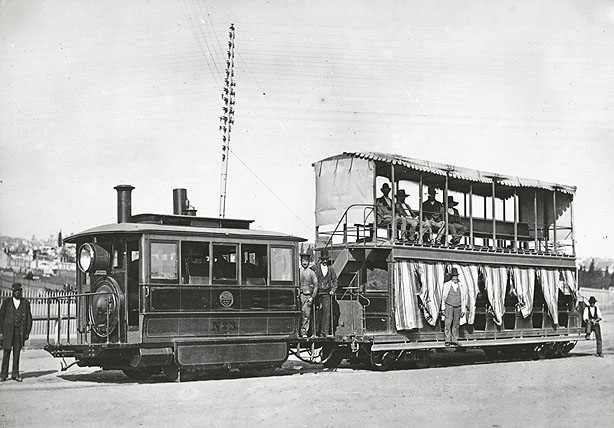
Sydney steam tram showing steam motor and trailer car: c. 1879

=== Tram ===
As part of Sydney's tramway network, two tram lines ran through Paddington, one along Oxford Street, the other through Five Ways. The Oxford Street line opened in 1884 as a steam tramway to Bondi. Electric services commenced on the same line in 1902. Both lines closed in 1960.

=== Bus ===
Paddington is serviced by Transdev John Holland and Transit Systems buses, either along Oxford Street or through Five Ways. Oxford Street services:

- 333 Circular Quay to North Bondi
- 352 Bondi Junction station to Marrickville Metro via Surry Hills and Newtown
- 440 Bondi Junction station to Rozelle

Five Ways services:

- 389 Bondi Junction station to Pyrmont

Bus services are also on New South Head Road between the city, Woolloomooloo, Kings Cross, Rushcutters Bay, Double Bay, Rose Bay, Vaucluse and Watsons Bay.

=== Rail ===
Paddington's closest railway station is Edgecliff, an underground railway station on the Eastern Suburbs line of the Sydney Trains network.

== Landmarks ==
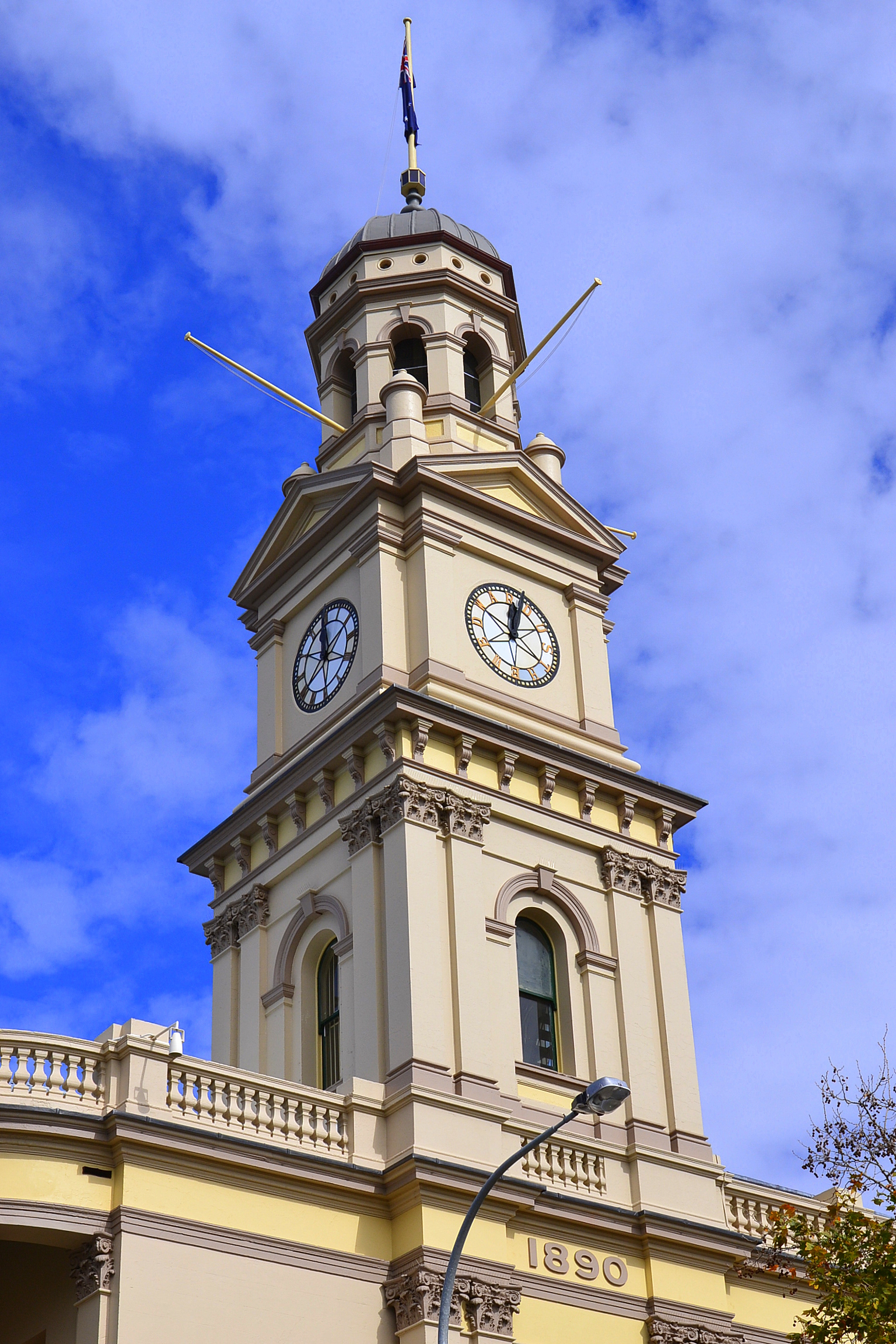
Town Hall clock tower

=== Paddington Town Hall ===
Sir Henry Parkes laid the foundation stone for the Paddington Town Hall in 1890 when Paddington was a separate municipality. It opened in 1891 and remains a distinctive example of Victorian architecture in Sydney. The clock tower is 32 metres high and being on the ridge of Oxford Street, dominates the skyline.

Whilst the eastern, southern, and western faces of the clock display the conventional Roman clock-face numerals, the Roman numerals on the northern (Oxford Street) side of the clock have been replaced as follows: 1:D, 2:U, 3:S, 4:T, 5:H, 6:E, 7:VII, 8:E, 9:D, 10:V, 11:A, 12:R. This was done to celebrate the coronation of King Edward VII; and, commencing at where the VIII ought to be, the northern clock-face reads E.D.V.A.R.D.U.S T.H.E VII.

The clock was officially set in motion on Wednesday, 30 August 1905, by Mr. J.H. Carruthers, the Premier of New South Wales, who mentioned in passing that "he thought that the day on which peace had been declared between Russia and Japan was a fitting time to set it in motion" and that "he hoped there would be peace and goodwill on earth as long as the clock continued to go".

The building now houses radio studios, a cinema, Paddington Library, and is a venue for private functions. Paddington Town Hall was the site of a meeting of Rugby League players in 1908, at which the Eastern Suburbs Rugby League club, now the Sydney Roosters, was officially formed.

=== Victoria Barracks ===
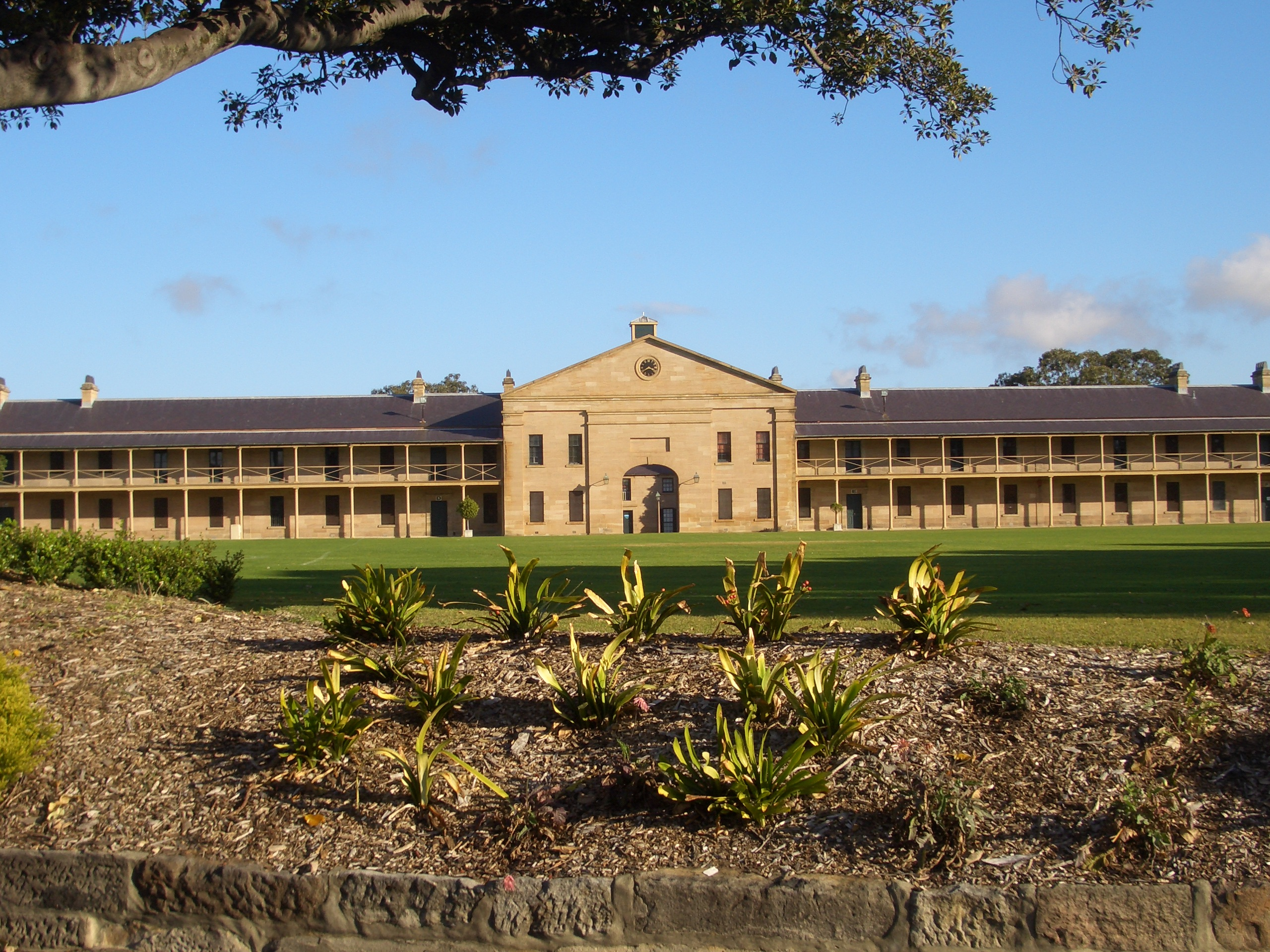
Victoria Barracks, Main Barrack Block

Victoria Barracks, constructed between 1841 and 1849, is one of the best-known examples of military architecture in Australia. The sandstone buildings were designed by Lieutenant-Colonel George Barney, who also built Fort Denison and reconstructed Circular Quay. Victoria Barracks, including the Army Museum of New South Wales, is open to visitors on Thursdays from 10:00 a.m. to 1.00 p.m.

=== Sydney Cricket Ground ===
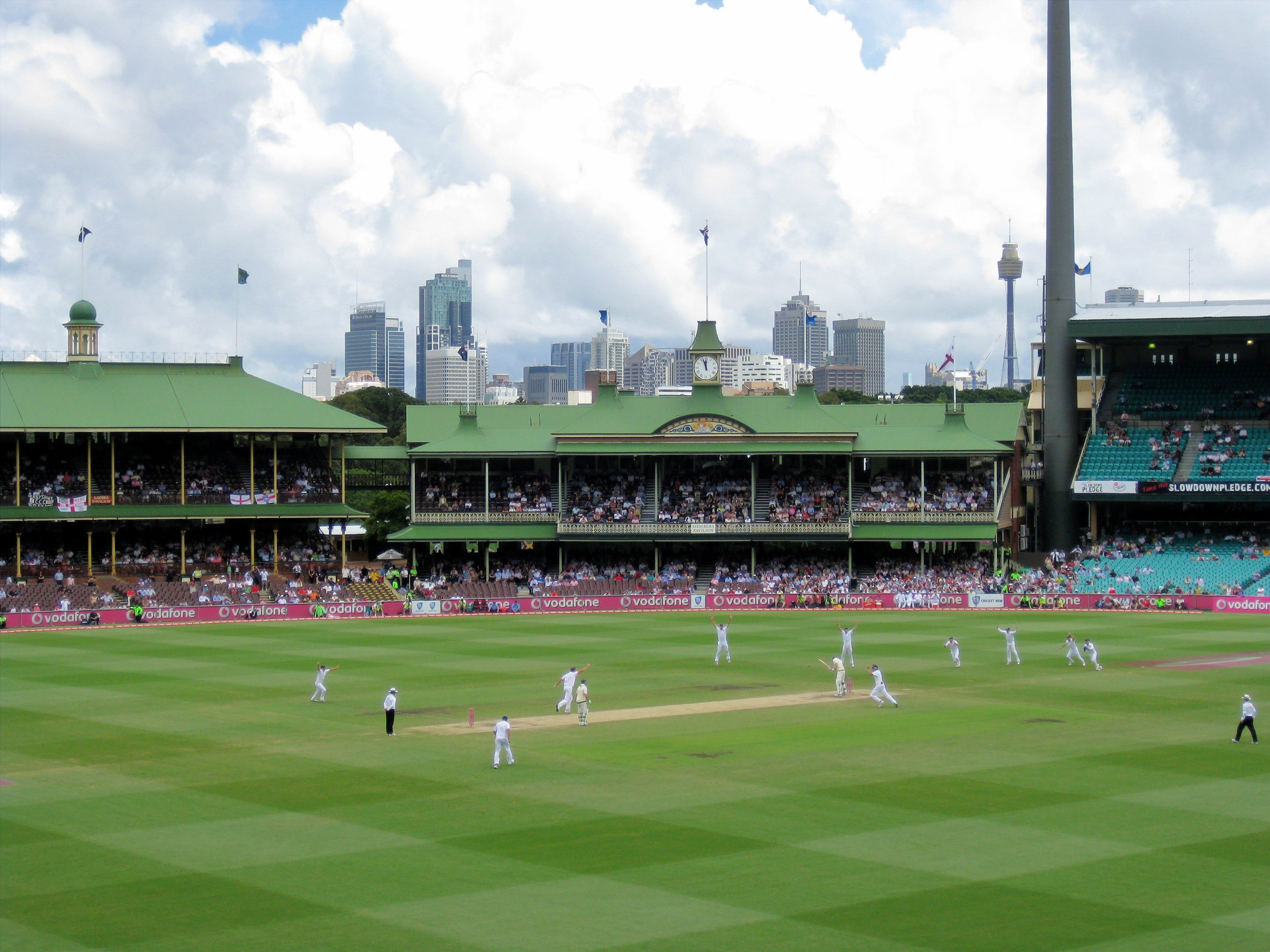
Sydney Cricket Ground in 2011

The Sydney Cricket Ground (SCG) can be accessed from Moore Park Road on Paddington's southern border. The first test match to be played at the SCG was in February 1882. The SCG is the home ground of the Sydney Swans Australian Rules Football club. Public tours are available every day except Sundays.

=== Sydney Football Stadium ===
The Sydney Football Stadium (SFS or Allianz Stadium) is on Moore Park Road on Paddington's southern border. It is the home ground of the Sydney Roosters, NSW Waratahs and Sydney FC, and can be seen best from the top of Oatley Road, just outside the Paddington Town Hall. The original stadium was demolished in 2019 and a replacement is under reconstruction, to be opened in September 2022.

=== Juniper Hall ===
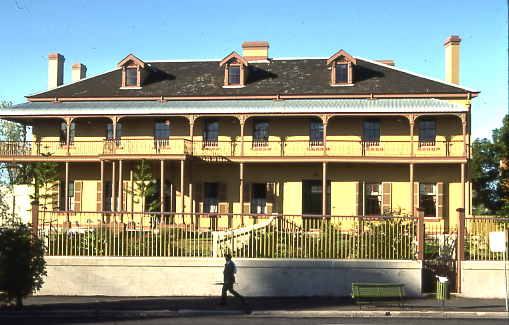
Juniper Hall

Juniper Hall was built by Robert Cooper, an ex-convict, in the 1820s and is the oldest house in Paddington. It is a large, dominating structure located diagonally opposite the Paddington Town Hall. It underwent significant restoration when owned by the National Trust of Australia. In 2013 the building was sold to the Moran family for the Moran Arts Foundation for exhibitions and events.

=== Oxford Street ===
Oxford Street was originally used as an Aboriginal walking track, then as a faster route to South Head. Trams once ran along Oxford Street to Bondi and other beaches. Once serving the needs of the local residents, the street has changed to now serve the many visitors to Paddington who come to promenade and window shop.

=== Paddington Reservoir ===
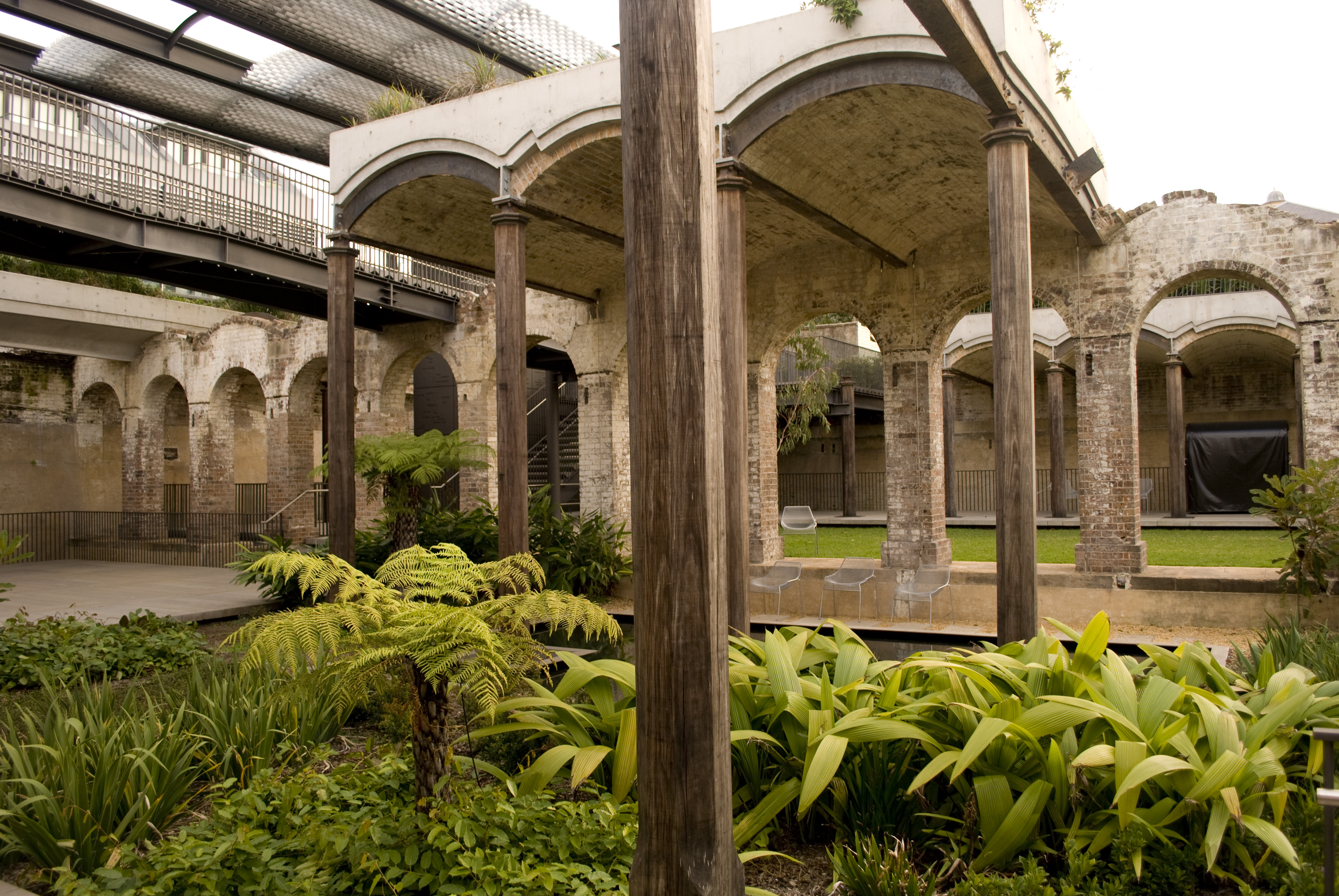
Paddington Reservoir Gardens

The Paddington Reservoir in Oxford Street provided water to parts of Sydney between 1866 and 1899. In 2006 the remnants of the reservoir's vaulted construction were preserved with a sunken garden known as the Paddington Reservoir Gardens or Walter Read Reserve.

=== Trumper Park Oval ===
Trumper Park Oval, located at the corner of Glenmore Road & Hampden Street, is named in honour of Victor Trumper, a famous Australian test cricketer. The oval has a long history with the Australian Football East Sydney club, as well as with cricket and local athletics. A series of walking trails through a dense bushland gully connect to surrounding streets and lead to the Paddington Bowling Club and Trumper Park Tennis Centre.

=== White City Tennis Centre ===
The White City Tennis Centre has been a big part of Australian Tennis since its opening in 1922. The venue has played host to many events including the New South Wales Open, the Australian Open and the Davis Cup. In 1954 a crowd of 25,000 watched the Davis Cup final, a record that still stands for any outdoor Davis Cup match played in Australia.

== Churches ==
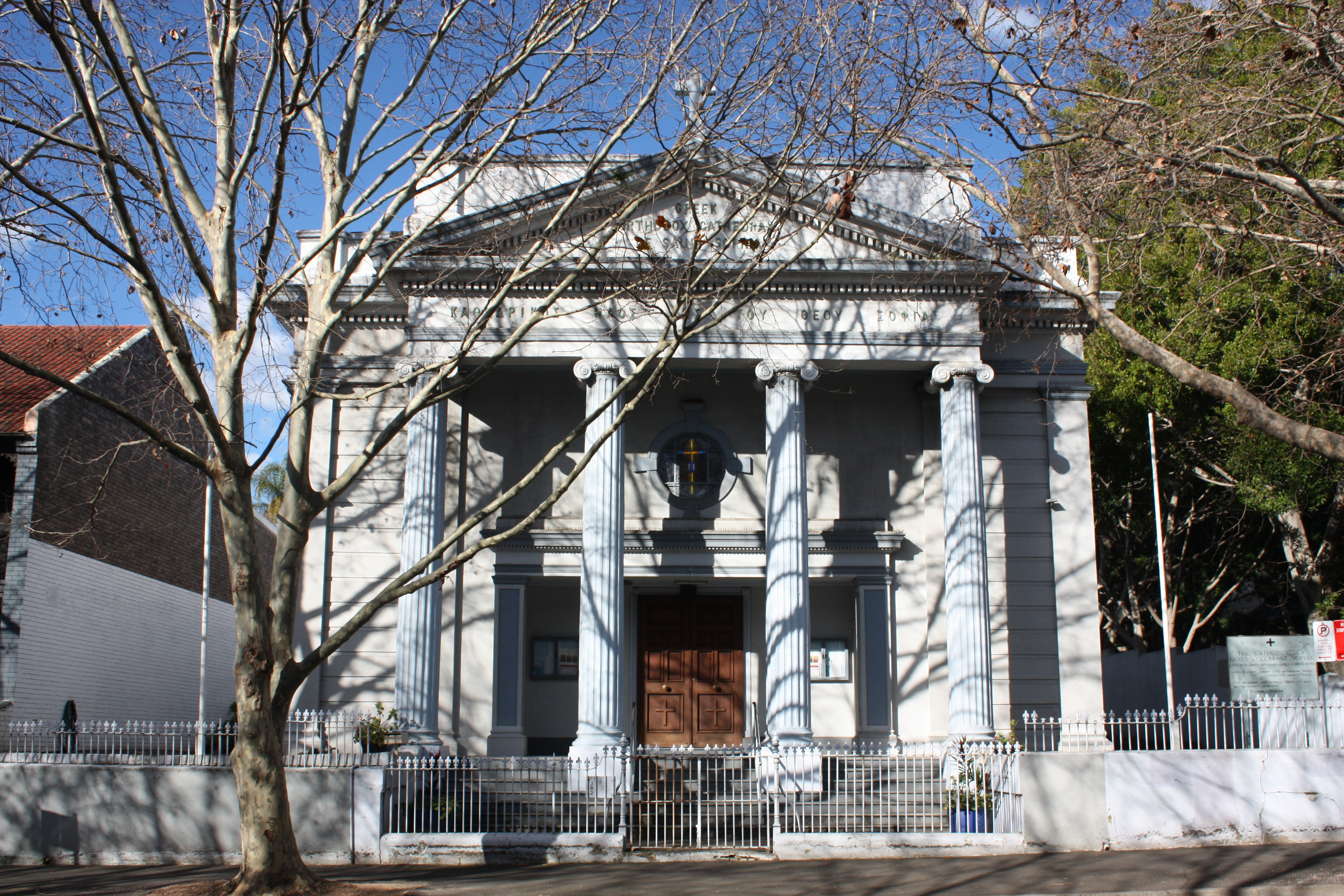
Paddington Greek Orthodox Church

Places of worship in Paddington include:

- Paddington Church of Christ, Paddington Street
- Paddington Uniting Church, Oxford Street
- St Francis of Assisi Catholic Church, Oxford Street
- St George's Anglican Church, Five Ways
- St Matthias Anglican Church, Oxford Street
- St Sophia's Greek Orthodox Cathedral, Cnr of South Dowling Street and Napier Street

== Education ==
- KU Peter Pan Paddington Preschool, Union Street
- KU Kira Child Care Centre, Cnr Moore Park Road and Oatley Road
- Paddington Church of Christ Kindergarten, Paddington Street
- Paddington Children's Centre, Paddington Uniting Church, Oxford Street
- SDN Paddington, Heeley Street

Primary;

- Glenmore Road Public School, Glenmore Road and Cambridge Street
- Paddington Public School, Oxford Street
- St Francis of Assisi School, Oxford Street
- Sydney Grammar School (Edgecliff Preparatory School), Alma Street

Secondary;

- Nil. Sydney Technical High School, opened in Albion Street in 1925 was relocated to Bexley in 1956.

Tertiary;

- UNSW Art & Design, Napier Street
- Academy of Makeup, Victoria Street

== Community and recreation ==
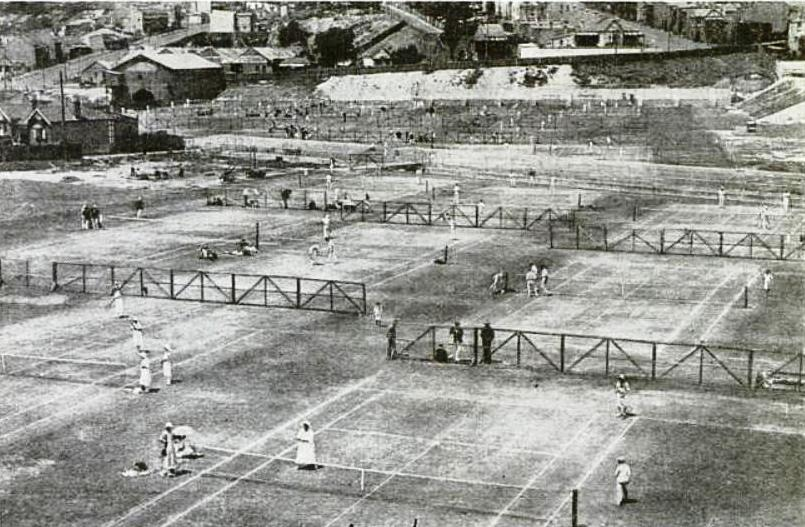
White City Tennis Club, 1923

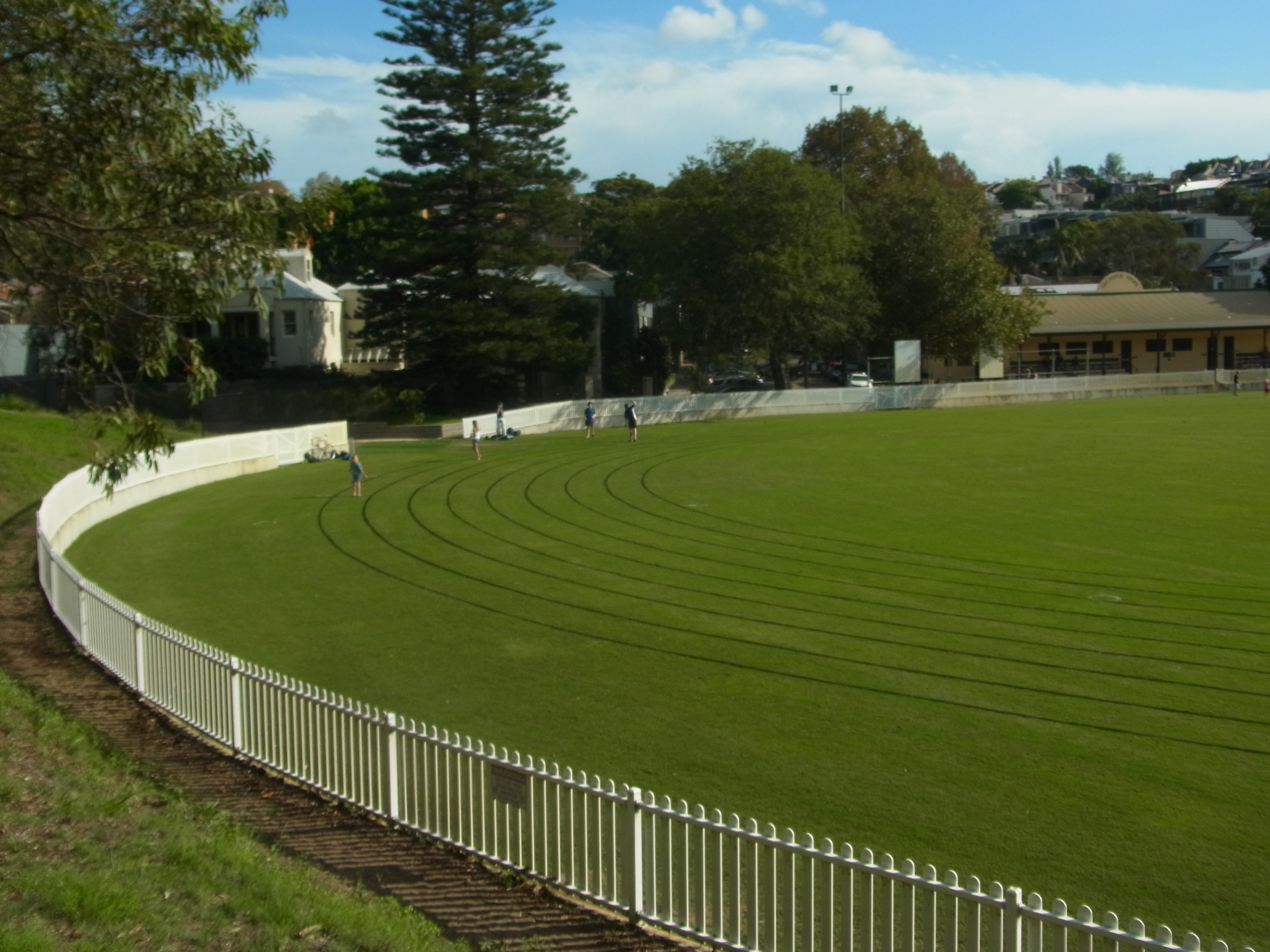
Trumper Park 2014

Community Groups

- Paddington-Darlinghurst Community Working Group
- The Paddington Society, a community action group
- Paddington Woollahra RSL Club, 220–232 Oxford Street
- Paddington Woollahra Youth Service (1975–1990)

Sport

- Maccabi Tennis White City, Alma Street
- Paddington Lawn Bowls Club, Quarry Road
- The Palms Tennis Centre, Quarry Road
- UTS Australian Football Club play home games at Trumper Park Oval

Libraries

- Paddington Library, a sub branch of Woollahra Library, is located at 249 Oxford Street, on the ground floor of Paddington Town Hall

Cinemas

- Chauvel Cinema, Oatley Road next to Paddington Town Hall (named after filmmaker Charles Chauvel)
- Palace Verona Cinema, 17 Oxford Street

== Art galleries ==
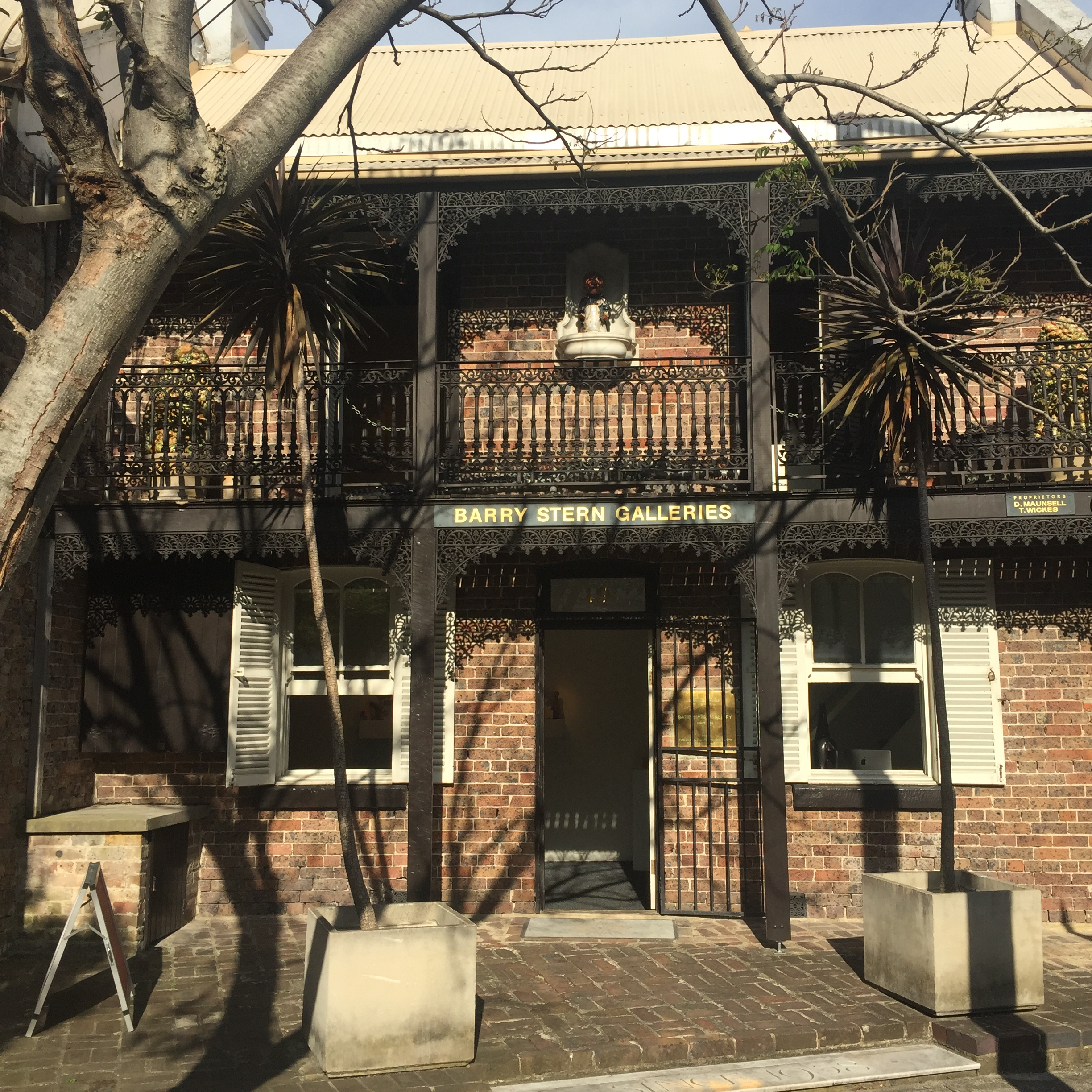
Maunsell Wickes (previously Barry Stern) Galleries on Glenmore Road

Numerous private art galleries are a feature of Paddington. They include:

- Art House Gallery, 66 Mclachlan Avenue
- Australian Galleries, 15 Roylston Street
- Blender Gallery, 16 Elizabeth Street
- Christopher Day Galleries, Cnr Elizabeth & Windsor Streets
- Martin Browne Contemporary, 15 Hampton Street
- Maunsell Wickes at Barry Stern Galleries, Glenmore Road
- Moran Arts Foundation, Juniper Hall 250 Oxford Street
- Roslyn Oxley 9 Gallery, 8 Soudan Lane
- Sabbia Gallery, 120 Glenmore Road
- Savill Galleries, 156 Hargrave Street
- Sherman Contemporary Art Foundation, 16 Goodhope Street
- Wagner Art Gallery, 39 Gurner Street

Non private galleries:

- Australian Centre for Photography, 257 Oxford Street (since moved to 72 Oxford Street, Darlinghurst).
- Galleries UNSW, COFA, corner of Oxford Street and Greens Road.
- Kudos Gallery, 6 Napier Street

== Hotels ==
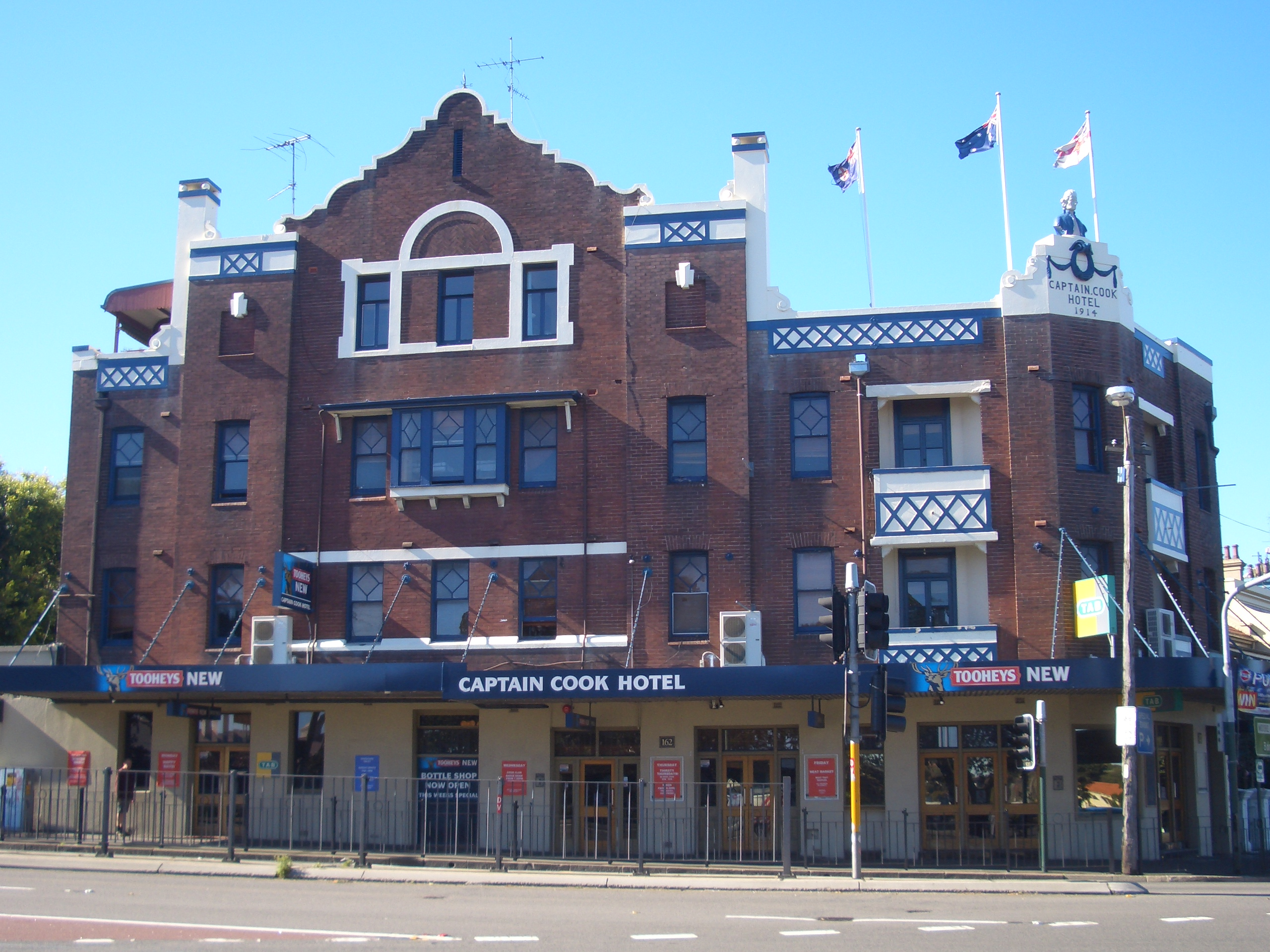
Captain Cook Hotel, Flinders Street

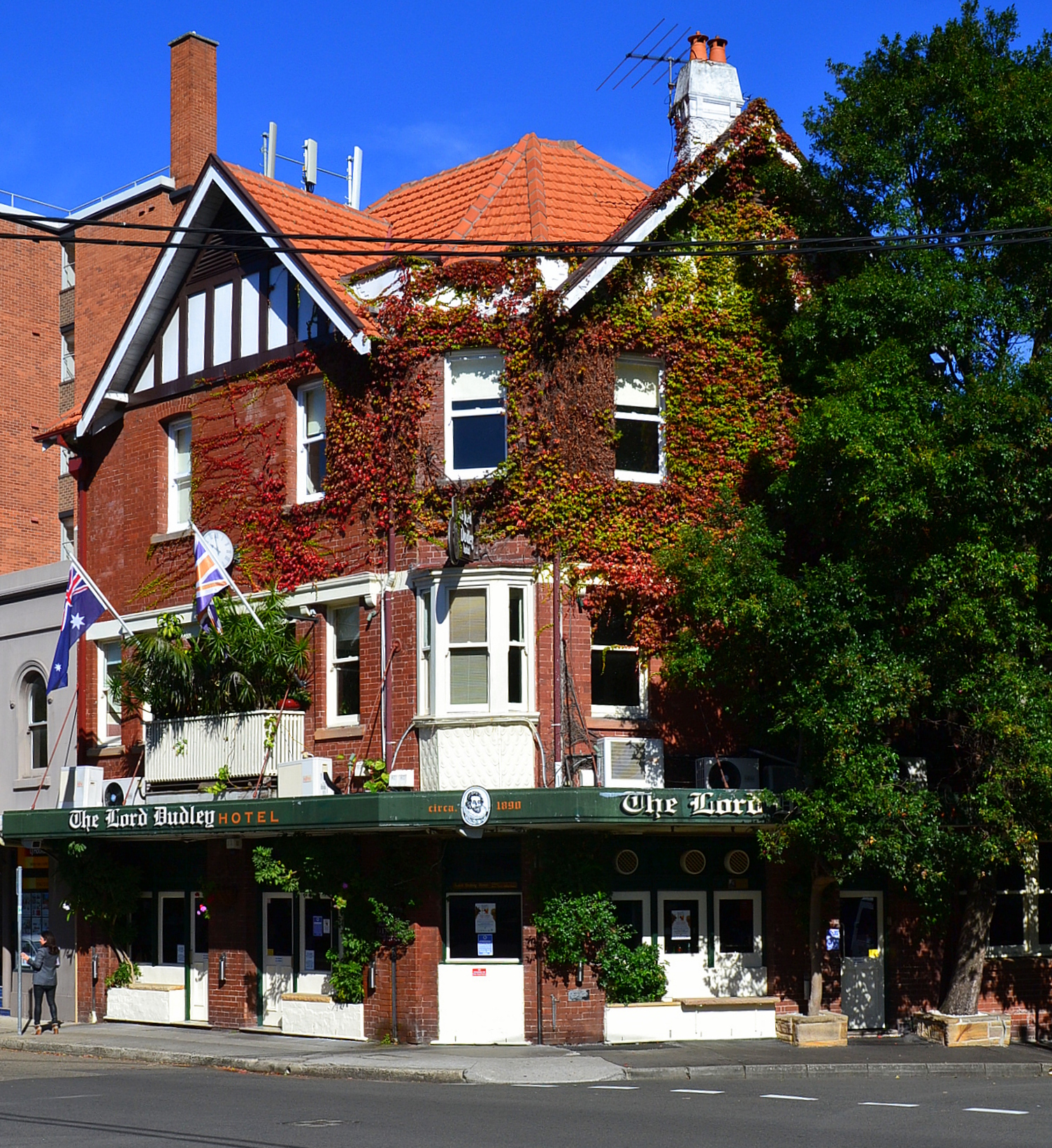
The Lord Dudley Hotel on Jersey Road

Paddington has a notably high number of hotels (only a few offer accommodation)

- Arts Hotel, 21 Oxford Street
- Bellevue Hotel, 159 Hargrave Street
- Captain Cook Hotel, 162 Flinders Street
- Four in Hand Hotel, 105 Sutherland Street
- Grand National, 161 Underwood Street
- Imperial Hotel, 252 Oxford Street
- London Hotel, 85 Underwood Street
- Lord Dudley, 236 Jersey Road
- Olympic Hotel, 308 Moore Park Road
- Paddington Arms Hotel 384 Oxford Street
- Paddington Inn Hotel, 338 Oxford Street
- Rose, Shamrock and Thistle, 27–30 Oxford Street
- Royal Hotel, 237 Glenmore Road, Five Ways
- The Light Brigade Hotel, 2A Oxford Street (Woollahra)
- The Village Inn, 9–11 Glenmore Road
- Unicorn Hotel, 106 Oxford Street

== Hospitals and aged care ==
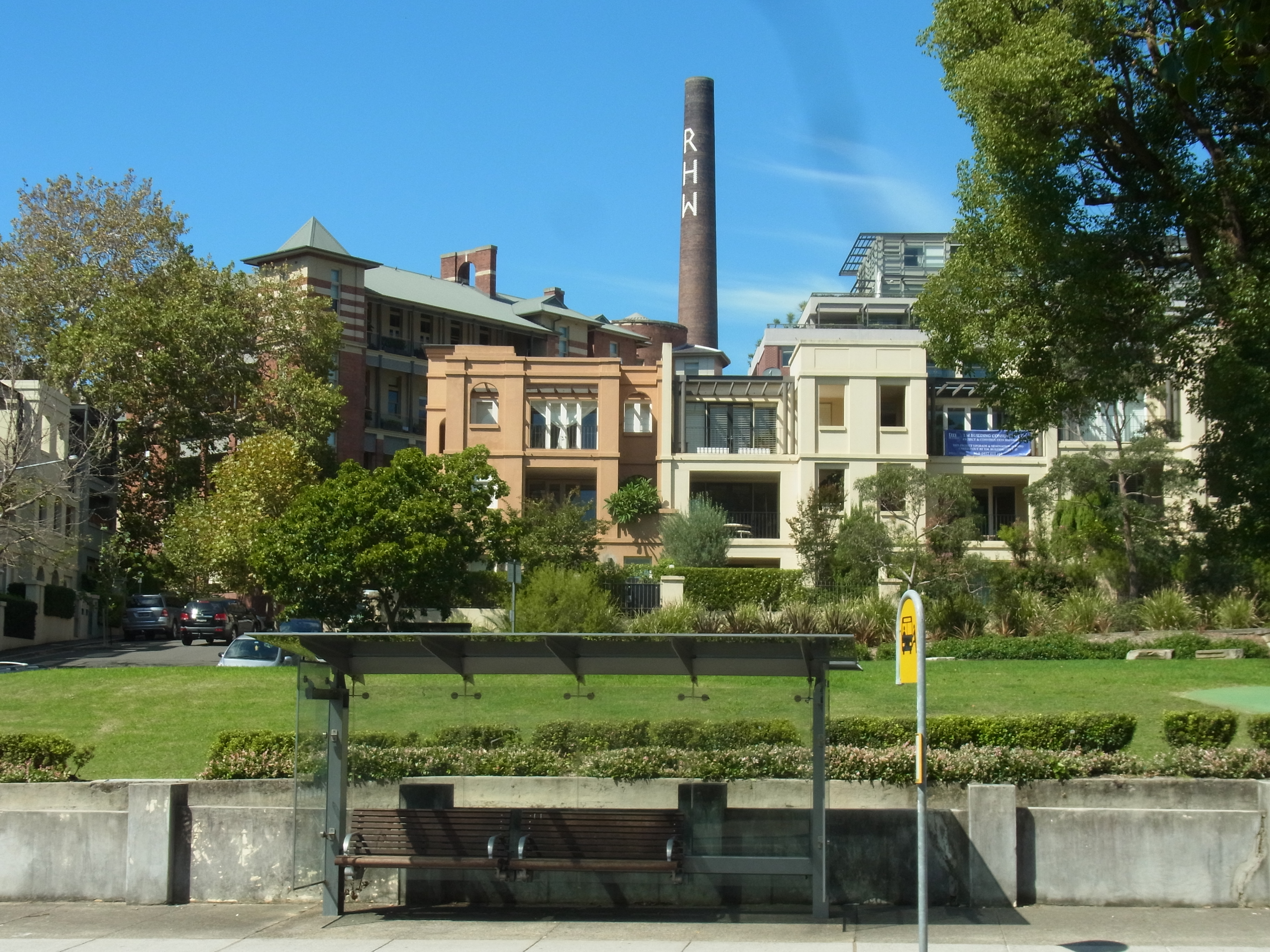
New housing on site of former Royal Hospital for Women 2014

Royal Hospital for Women (RHW) The Benevolent Society of NSW officially opened the Royal Hospital for Women in Glenmore Road on 3 May 1905. The hospital remained at the site for almost 100 years, providing health care for thousands of women and their babies. In 1997 the hospital moved to Randwick, and the Paddington site was sold and developed for housing, known as Paddington Green.

Scottish Hospital The Scottish Hospital in Cooper Street includes the gardens and original house 'The Terraces', one of the ten Gentry Villa subdivisions granted by Governor Bourke in the 1830s. In 2010 Presbyterian Aged Care NSW & ACT (PAC) advanced plans for the rejuvenation and expansion of aged care services available from the Scottish Hospital Site, Paddington.

== Housing ==
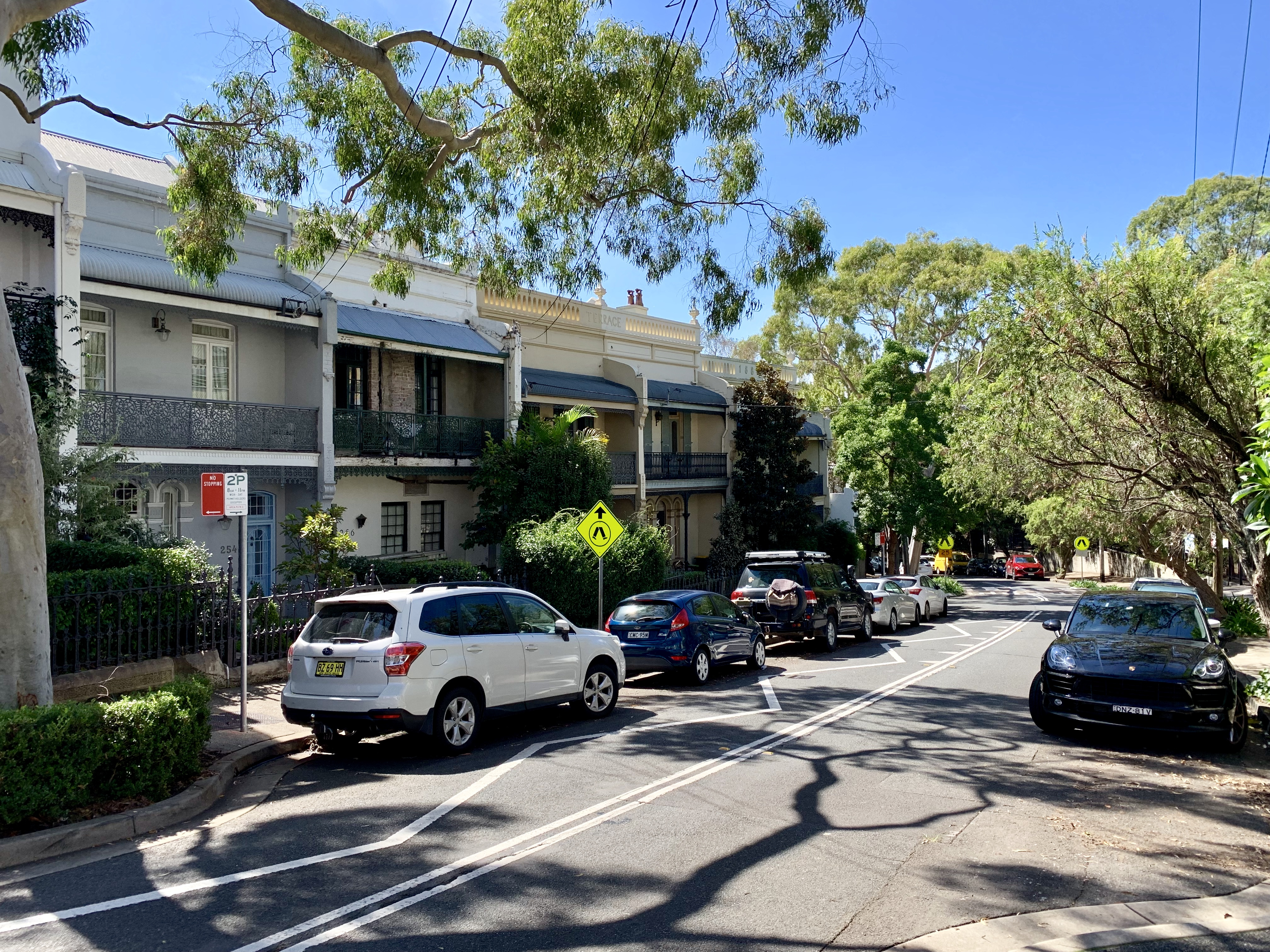
Terraced houses

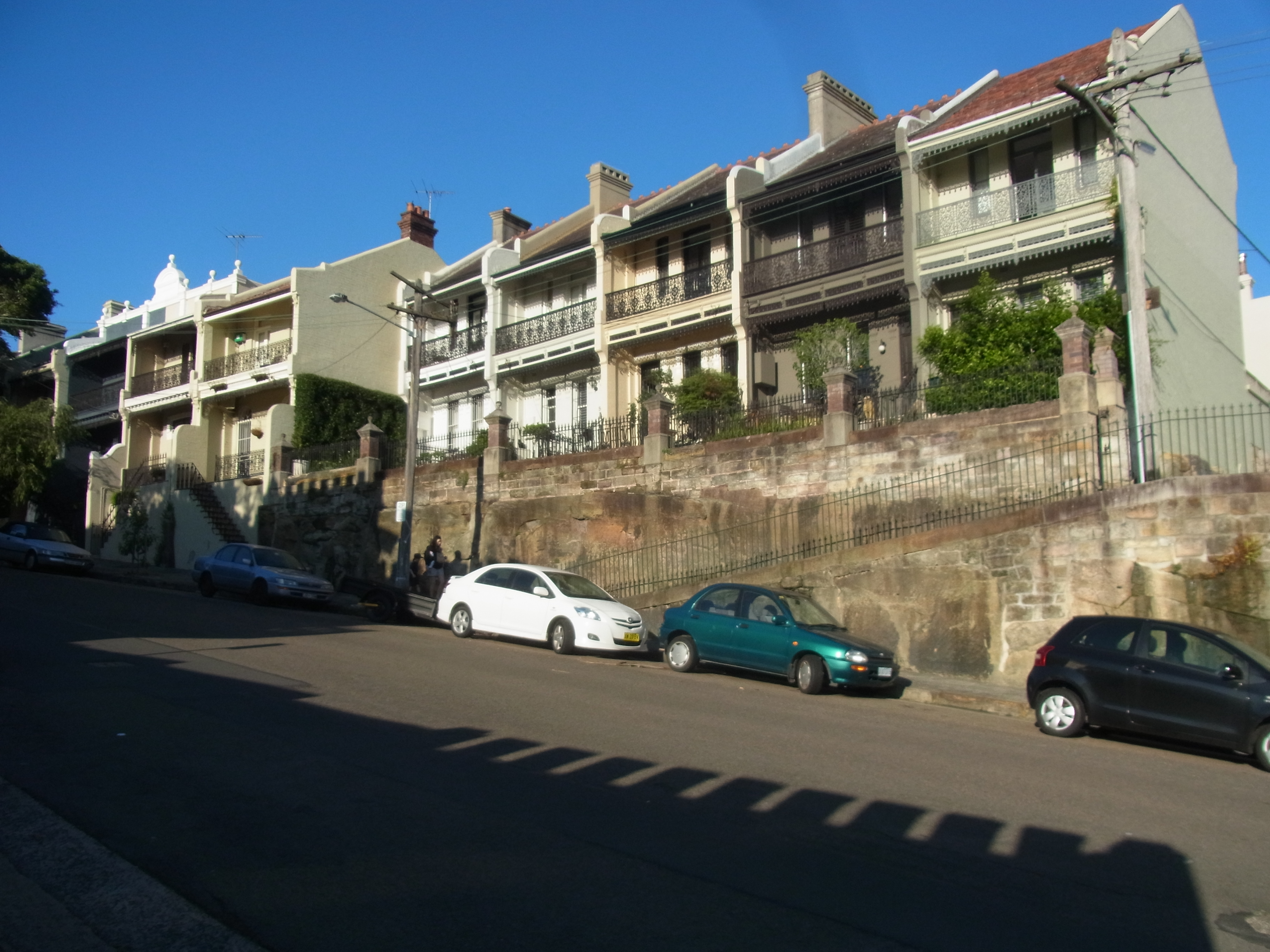
Terraces on Cascade Street, showing the uneven terrain of the area

=== Pre-1945 ===
The 'Victorian' suburb of Paddington grew into its present form largely during a 30-year boom that began in the mid-1870s, particularly with developments in public transport, initially with horse-drawn buses which travelled to the city and back from a terminus at Glenmore Road, and then with the introduction of steam trams, going through to Bondi in 1884.

While the suburb's growth slowed during the economic depression of the 1890s, it was completed within the first decade of the twentieth century. Also during the first half of the twentieth century, and reflecting a concern with healthy urban living, terraced housing in Australia fell into disfavour, and the inner-city areas came to be considered 'slums'. Paddington, a mainly working-class area, was affected by this change in attitude.

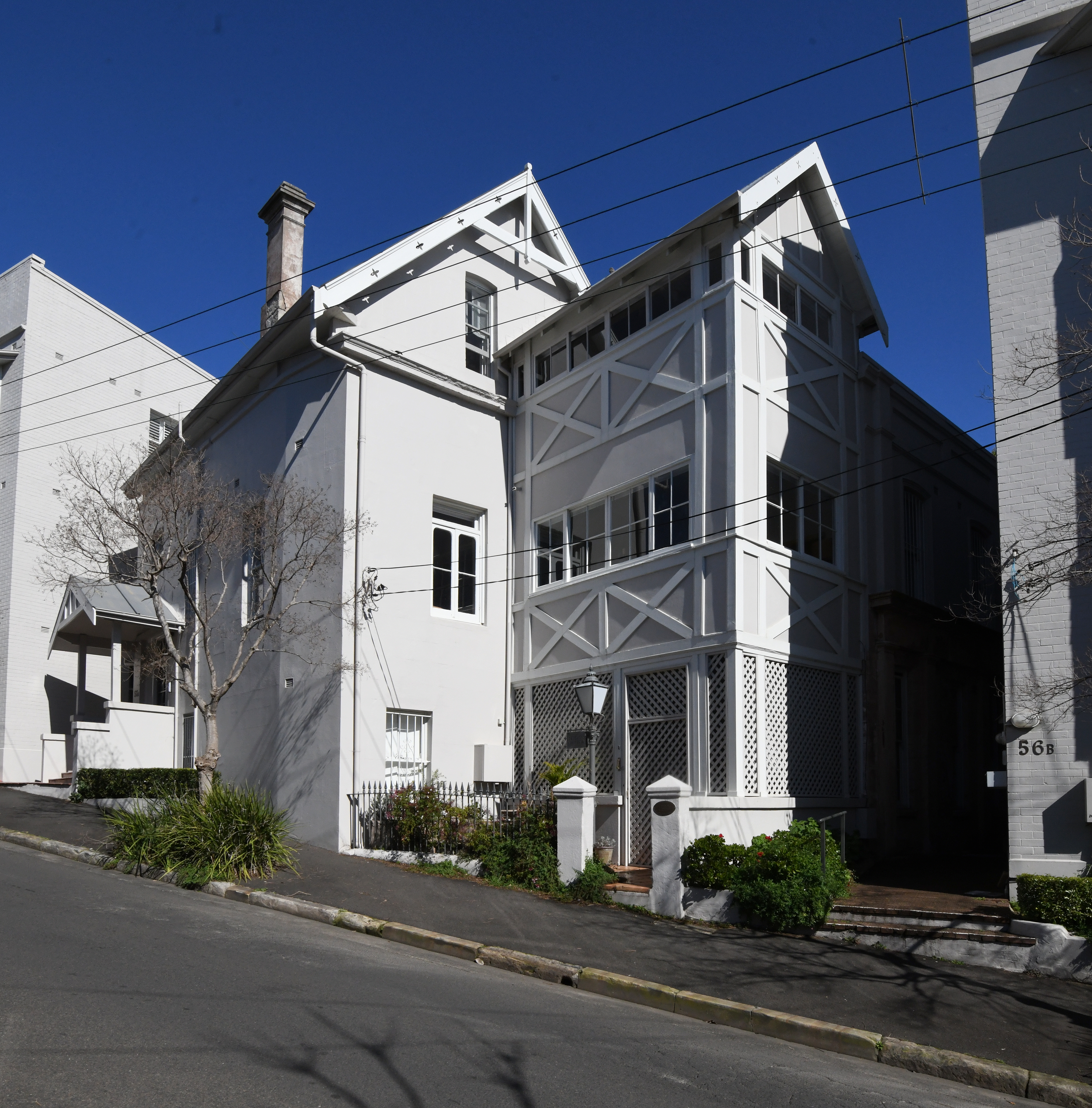
Engehurst

=== 1945–2000 ===
After World War II, while Paddington still remained home to the many working-class families who had lived there for generations, it also became home to migrant workers and their families, who were used to living in close proximity with their neighbours. These residents were joined from the early 1960s by artists and students, attracted by the cheap rents.

Gentrification also began in that decade, speeding up in the following years. With it came an interest in the unique historical and aesthetic qualities of the area, and an awareness that the suburb needed to be protected.

In 2025, 160 Oxford Street was the first housing proposal in the Paddington Heritage Conservation Area to combine the Government of New South Wales affordable housing scheme with the low and mid rise reforms permitting taller buildings.

=== Heritage listings ===
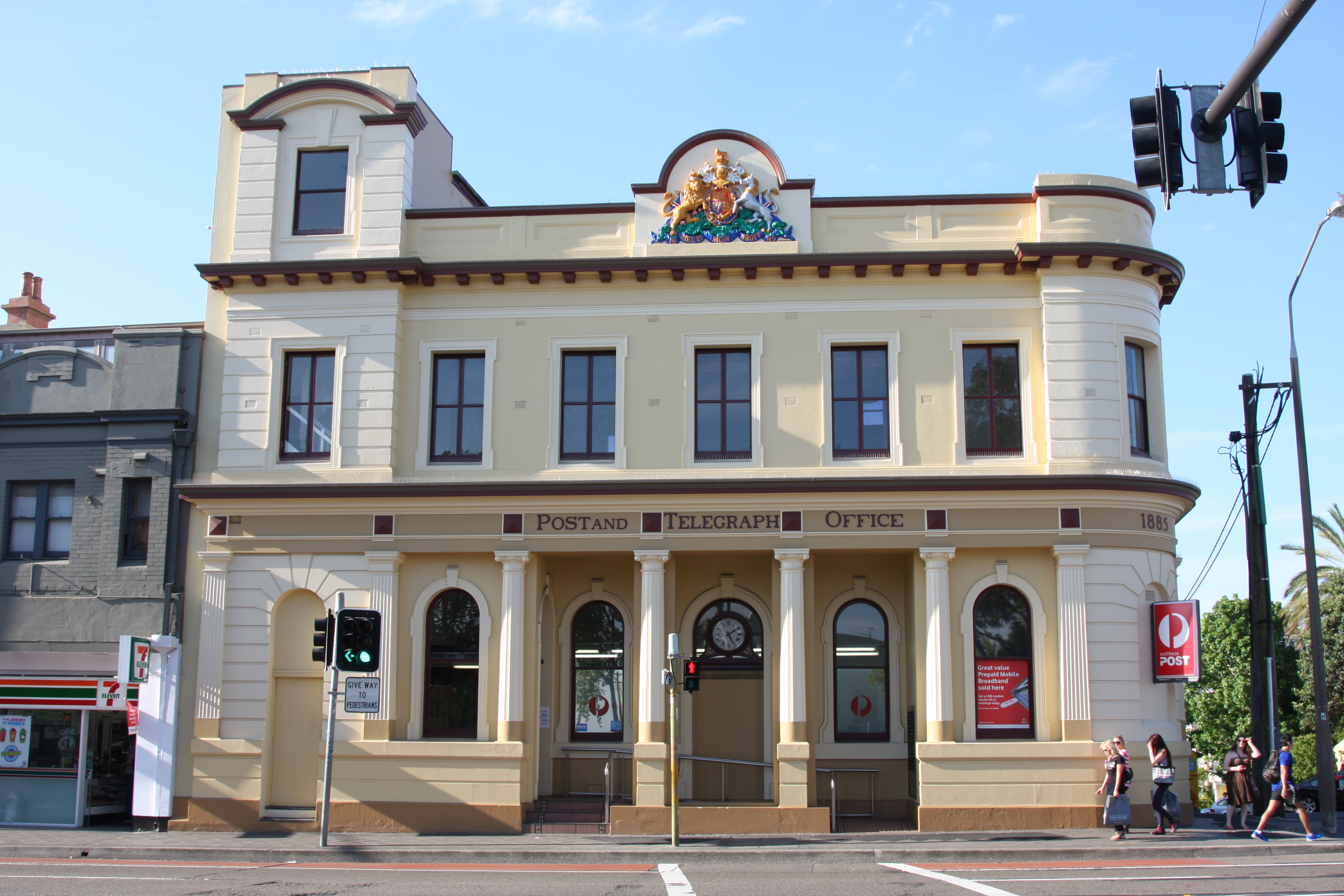
Paddington Post Office, Oxford Street

Paddington has a number of heritage-listed sites, including the following sites listed on the New South Wales State Heritage Register:

- 1 Ormond Street: Juniper Hall, Paddington
- 56a Ormond Street: Engehurst
- 246 Oxford Street: Paddington Post Office
- 1 Young Street: Paddington Substation
- 249 Oxford Street: Paddington Town Hall
- 255a Oxford Street: Paddington Reservoir
- 302–304 South Dowling Street: Saint Sophia's Cathedral, Sydney

The following sites are listed on other heritage registers:

- Victoria Barracks, 1841–1848, Oxford Street
- Paddington Court House, Jersey Road
- Paddington Public School, 1870 and 1892 buildings, Oxford Street
- Uniting Church and Parsonage, 1877, Oxford Street
- St Matthias Church Group, 1859–1861, Oxford Street
- St Matthias Former Rectory, 1873, 495 Oxford Street
- St Matthias Church Hall, 1882, Oxford Street
- Royal Hotel, 1885, Glenmore Road
- Tabor Cottage, Jersey Road (formerly Paddington Watch House)

Planning control in Paddington is managed by Woollahra Municipal Council to the north and the City of Sydney to the south.

== Demographics ==
The population of Paddington, at the 2016 census, was 12,911. 59.9% of people were born in Australia. The most common countries of birth were England 8.2%, New Zealand 3.5%, United States of America 1.8%, South Africa 1.1% and France 1.0%. 77.7% of people only spoke English at home. Other languages spoken at home included French 1.7%, Spanish 1.3%, Italian 1.0% and Greek 1.0%. The most common responses for religion were No Religion 40.2% and Catholic 20.1%. 63.7% of people in the suburb live in semi-detached, row or terrace houses or townhouse (many typical Victorian terrace houses), 31.9% lived in apartments and 2.8% lived in separate houses. The suburb is a high-wealth area, with a medium weekly household income of $2,509 compared to the Australian average of $1,438.

At the 2021 census, there were 12,701 people living in Paddington.

== Notable residents ==
- Phillip Adams, broadcaster
- Andrew Andersons, architect
- Chris Bosse, architect
- David Boyd, artist
- Ita Buttrose, journalist and TV personality
- Hugh Connell, politician
- Noel Ferrier, actor
- Marea Gazzard, sculptor and ceramicist
- Peggy Glanville-Hicks, composer
- Alan Kippax, cricketer
- Jeanie Little, TV personality
- George Metcalfe, educationalist
- Sheridan Mortlock, model and beauty queen
- Margaret Olley, artist
- Jesse Baird, TV personality and goal umpire
- Jeff Orford, rugby league player
- Gordon Parsons, singer, songwriter
- Brian Staunton, rugby league player
- Pat Sullivan, film producer
- Victor Trumper, cricketer
- David Warner, cricketer
- Jacki Weaver, actress
