= Laboratory for Visionary Architecture =

Australian architectural firm

Laboratory for Visionary Architecture (LAVA) is an architectural firm set up in 2007. Its stated goal is to combine digital workflow, nature's structural principles and the latest digital fabrication technologies to build MORE WITH LESS: more (architecture) with less (material/energy/time/cost). It was awarded the 2016 European Architecture Laureate for "a more critical, intellectual, and artistic approach to the design of buildings and cities" by the European Centre for Architecture Art Design and Urban Studies and The Chicago Athenaeum Museum of Architecture and Design.

== Activities ==
LAVA takes their inspiration from nature, using the principle of biomimetics. Future technologies are merged with the patterns of organisation found in nature to build a smarter, friendlier, more socially and environmentally responsible future. LAVA uses computation to simulate the natural behavior of growth and adaptation of species.

It maintains offices in Stuttgart, Berlin, and Sydney. The group has three directors, Tobias Wallisser is based in Berlin, Alexander Rieck is based in Stuttgart while Chris Bosse is based in Sydney.

== Projects ==
- German Pavilion Expo 2020 Dubai, UAE
- German Pavilion Expo 2025 Osaka, Japan
- Energy Storage Centre Heidelberg, Germany
- Bayreuth Youth Hostel Bayreuth, Germany
- KACST King Abdulaziz City for Science and Technology Headquarters Riyadh, Saudi Arabia
- Phillips Lighting Headquarters Eindhoven, The Netherlands
- Central Park concept HCMC, Vietnam
- Installations such as the lycra Green Void
- Winner of the competition design for the city centre of the CO_{2}-free city Masdar in Abu Dhabi
- ‘Reskinning’ of the UTS building in Sydney
- LAVA's Martian Embassy in Sydney houses shop and writing classes for kids in an immersive space
- Tower Skin
- Snowflake Tower

== Awards ==
- Awards include:
- International Architecture Award
- World Architecture Festival WAFX Award
- Australian Institute of Architecture Award
- Australian Interior Design Award
- UN partnered ZEROprize Re-Skinning Award
- I. D. Annual Design Review, IDEA Award
- AAFAB AA London, Cityscape Dubai Award Sustainability
