= Chris Bosse =

German architect (born 1971)

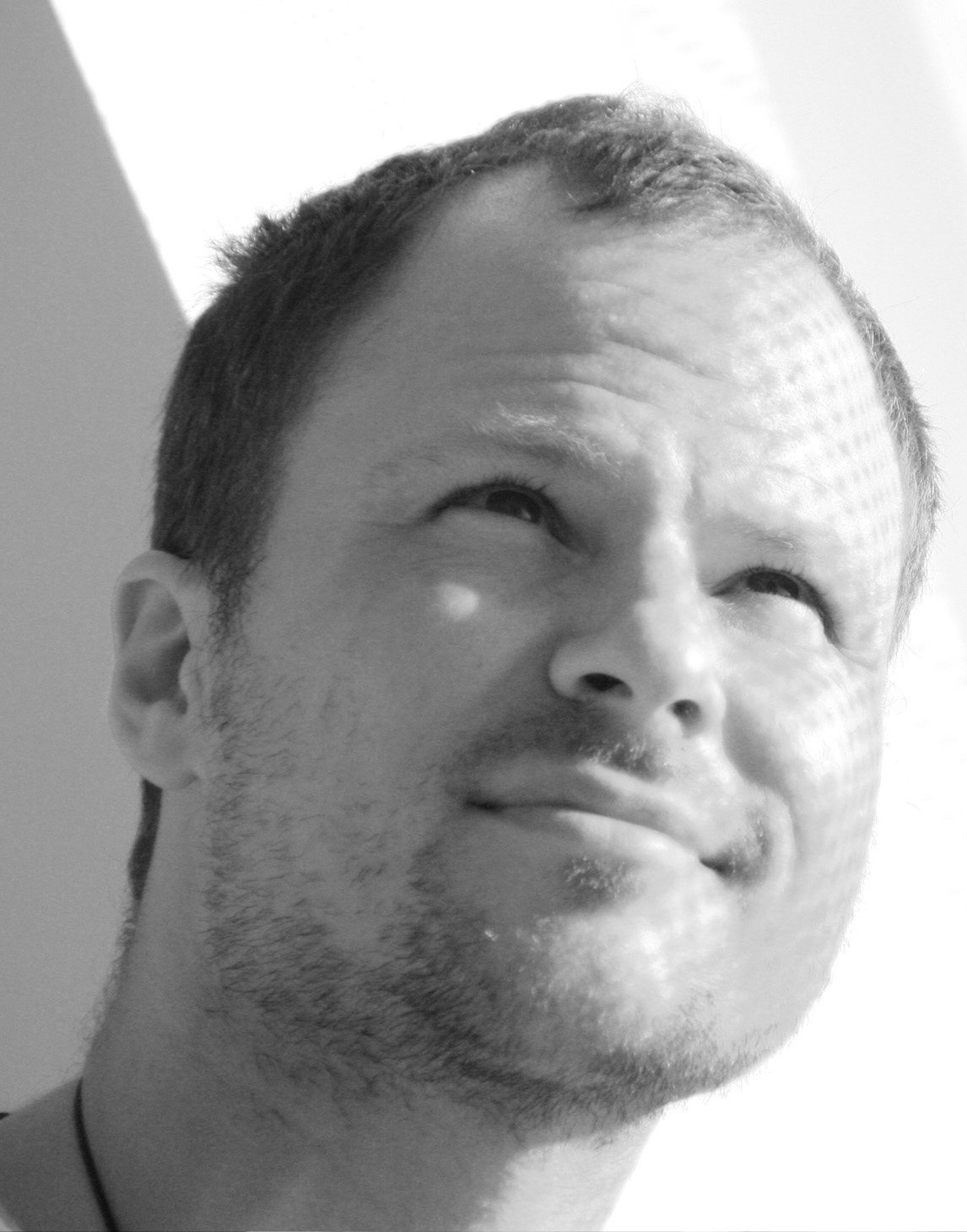
- Born: 30 September 1971 (age 54); Stuttgart, West Germany
- Occupation: Architect
- Practice: Chris Bosse
- Buildings: Beijing National Aquatics Centre Moet Marque Digital Origami Masdar City Centre MSWCT Michael Schumacher Tower

Chris Bosse (born 30 September 1971) is a German architect. He is currently the director of the Laboratory for Visionary Architecture (LAVA) Asia Pacific, based in Sydney, Australia.

== Biography ==
Bosse was born in Stuttgart, Germany to an architect father, Wolfgang Bosse. His brother Jan became a theater director, while Bosse studied architecture, first in Berlin, Cologne, Stuttgart in Germany and later at EPFL in Lausanne and at the Academy of Architecture in Mendrisio, Switzerland. Following his studies, Bosse relocated to Sydney and began his career as an associate architect for PTW, contributing significantly to the design of the Beijing National Aquatics Centre for the 2008 Summer Olympics.

In 2008, Bosse won an Emerging Architect Award from RIBA in London, the 40 Under 40 award for emerging designers in Asia in 2012, and the Australian Design Honor Award at the Australian Design Center in Sidney in 2015.

In 2007, Bosse founded L-A-V-A (Laboratory for Visionary Architecture) with Tobias Walliser and Alexander Rieck.

Since 2010, Bosse has worked as an adjunct professor and Research Innovation fellow at the University of Technology Sydney (UTS) in Australia.

== Influences ==
Bosse has based his work on the computational study of organic structures and resulting spatial conceptions. In his practice, he often uses the practice of biomimetics. His research lies in the exploration of unusual structures, pushing the boundaries of the traditional understanding with structure and architecture with digital and experimental form findings. The potential for naturally evolving systems such as snowflakes, spider webs, and soap bubbles for new building typologies and structures informs Bosse's work. The fascination of organic matter, exploring its shape and tension, inspired Bosse in his architectural design.Through these observations, he infused his designs with beauty and emotion, transforming buildings from mere abstract objects into expressive works of art.

== Works ==
=== Laboratory for Visionary Architecture (LAVA) ===
Chris is one of 3 co-founders of the Laboratory for Visionary Architecture (LAVA) with Tobias Wallisser and Alexander Rieck. LAVA has offices in Sydney, Stuttgart, Berlin, and Vietnam.

LAVA is an international think tank set up in 2007 with a focus on research and design. Its stated goal is to reposition architecture at the forefront of cultural, technological and social change.

On 7 October 2008 at Dubai cityscape, Formula 1 driver Michael Schumacher and LAVA presented the design for The Michael Schumacher World Champion Tower (MSWCT), the first in a series of seven towers to be built worldwide.

LAVA architects won the bid to design the city center for the sustainable eco-city Masdar in the United Arab Emirates (UAE) in 2010. LAVA imagined an outdoor city-centre based on traditional European public plazas that would encourage social interaction. However, Masdar's arid climate leaves outdoor spaces subject to the heat of the desert. To ameliorate this problem and create a comfortable place to gather and shop, the architects incorporated adaptive building technologies. The project for the city centre includes a plaza, hotel, convention centre, entertainment and retail facilities. Masdar centre won the Special Award - Environmental Category in the 2009 Cityscape Dubai Awards.

LAVA's Digital Origami Tigers have travelled the world as part of the WWF year of the tiger campaign.

Tower Skin: Zeroprize winning speculative proposal for the UTS building in Sydney, re-purposes an inefficient and outdated building.

=== Other work ===
His other projects include the architectural installation 'Green Void', in Sydney, furniture including the Sherman Biblioteca, Sydney, office screens for Schiavello and a desk light ‘Evolution’ for Wallpaper* and ‘Light Void’ for Artemide; the MTV Awards set in Sydney; Myer fashion show set; an origami emergency shelter; and a planned futuristic residence on a Beijing rooftop. LAVA's Martian Embassy in Sydney houses shop and writing classes for children in an immersive space of oscillating plywood ribs integrating seating, counters, and shelves and animated by red planet light and sound projections. LAVA won [with DESIGNSPORT and JDAW] the international competition held by the Federal Sport Commission, Ethiopia, to design a new FIFA and Olympic-standard 60,000-seat stadium and sports village in Addis Ababa. Construction commenced in 2014.

In 2012, Bosse won the '40 Under 40 Award' that recognizes rising design stars under 40.

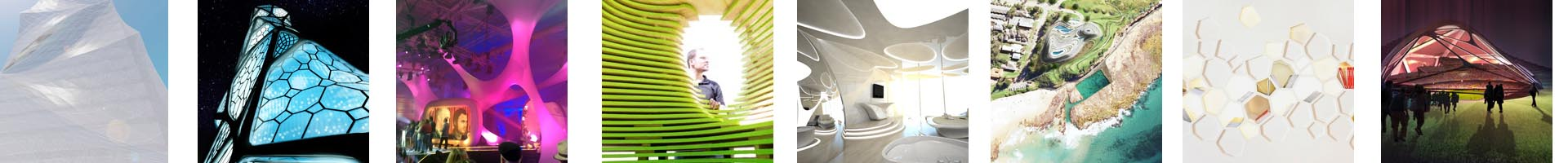
Chris Bosse and LAVA s projects in Australia, Abu Dhabi, China, Korea, and Germany
